= Saskatchewan Highway 322 =

Provincial highway in Saskatchewan, Canada

Highway 322

Route information
- Maintained by Ministry of Highways and Infrastructure
- Length: 29.3 km (18.2 mi)

Major junctions
- South end: Highway 20 at Last Mountain House Provincial Park
- North end: Highway 220 near Uhl's Bay

Location
- Country: Canada
- Province: Saskatchewan
- Rural municipalities: Longlaketon No. 219, McKillop No. 220

Highway system
- Provincial highways in Saskatchewan
← Highway 321	→ Highway 324

Highway 322 is a provincial highway in Saskatchewan, Canada. It runs from Highway 20 near Last Mountain House Provincial Park north-west then north to Highway 220 just east of Uhl's Bay. The highway follows the eastern shore of Last Mountain Lake and provides access to Silton, as well as several lakeside communities. It is about 29 kilometres (18 mi) long.

== Route description ==
Highway 322 begins in the Rural Municipality of Longlaketon No. 219 at an intersection with Highway 20, just immediately north of Last Mountain House Provincial Park, with the road continuing east as Township Road 212. It heads northwest, running parallel to both a railway and the eastern coastline of Last Mountain Lake, to have an intersection with the access road to Kannata Valley before passing through the southern portion of the village of Silton, where it goes through a switchback as it crosses the railway and has intersections with access roads to Saskatchewan Beach (Range Road 2220), Alta Vista (Township Road 214), and Shore Acres (Township Road 214). Entering the Rural Municipality of McKillop No. 220, the highway heads due northwest through rural farmland for several kilometres, where it has intersections with Township Road 220 (provides access to Sunset Cove, Pelican Pointe, and Sorensen Beach) and Township Road 222 (Provides access to Shoreline and Clearview Resort). Curving due northward, Highway 322 has intersections with Range Road 2221 (provides access to Mohr's Beach and the Glen Harbour Kids Camp) and Township Road 224 (provides access to Glen Harbour) as it crosses a small stream traverses rural farmland for several kilometres, having an intersection with Township Road 230 (provides access to MacPheat Park, Spring Bay, and Colesdale Park) before coming to an at a junction with Highway 220 just east of Uhl's Bay, with the road continuing north as Range Road 2230. The entire length of Highway 322 is a paved, two-lane highway.

== Major intersections ==
Rural municipality	Location	km	mi	Destinations	Notes
Longlaketon No. 219		0.0	0.0	Highway 20 – Strasbourg, Lumsden, Last Mountain House Provincial Park	Southern terminus; road continues east as Township Road 212
Longlaketon No. 219		2.2	1.4	Kannata Valley access road	
Longlaketon No. 219 / McKillop No. 220 boundary	Silton	4.5	2.8	Township Road 214 – Alta Vista, Shore Acres; Range Road 2220 – Saskatchewan Beach	
McKillop No. 220		9.1	5.7	Township Road 220 – Sunset Cove, Pelican Pointe, Sorenson's Beach	
McKillop No. 220		13.7	8.5	Township Road 222 – Shoreline, Clearview Resort	
McKillop No. 220		19.4	12.1	Range Road 2221 – Mohr's Beach, Glen Harbour Kids Camp	
McKillop No. 220		19.6	12.2	Township Road 224 – Glen Harbour	
McKillop No. 220		22.8	14.2	Township Road 230 – MacPheat Park, Spring Bay, Colesdale Park	
McKillop No. 220		29.3	18.2	Highway 220 – Uhl's Bay, Bulyea, Rowan's Ravine Provincial Park	Northern terminus; road continues north as Range Road 2230
1.000 mi = 1.609 km; 1.000 km = 0.621 mi

== See also ==
- Transportation in Saskatchewan
- Roads in Saskatchewan
