= Saskatchewan Highway 220 =

Provincial highway in Saskatchewan, Canada

Highway 220

Route information
- Maintained by Ministry of Highways and Infrastructure
- Length: 22.2 km (13.8 mi)

Major junctions
- West end: Rowan's Ravine Provincial Park
- Highway 322 near Uhl's Bay
- North end: Highway 20 at Bulyea

Location
- Country: Canada
- Province: Saskatchewan
- Rural municipalities: McKillop

Highway system
- Provincial highways in Saskatchewan
← Highway 219	→ Highway 221

Highway 220 is a provincial highway in the Canadian province of Saskatchewan. Saskatchewan's 200-series highways primarily service its recreational areas. The highway runs from Highway 20 near Bulyea until Rowan's Ravine Provincial Park. It intersects Highway 322 and passes through Uhl's Bay. The highway is about 22 kilometres (14 mi) long.

== Route description ==
Hwy 220 begins within Rowan's Ravine Provincial Park at a parking lot, just metres away from the shoreline of Last Mountain Lake. It heads east to pass through the main park gate, thereby leaving the park and travelling along the north side of Uhl's Bay, where it shares a short concurrency (overlap) with Hwy 731. Curving due eastward, the highway passes through rural farmland for several kilometres, where it meets the north end of Hwy 322, to come the southern edge of Bulyea, where Hwy 220 ends at the junction with Hwy 20, with the road continuing east as Township Road 234. Between Rowan's Ravine Provincial Park and Hwy 322, Hwy 220 is paved while between Hwy 322 and Hwy 20, it is gravel. The entire length of Hwy 220 is a two-lane highway lying within the Rural Municipality of McKillop No. 220.

== Major intersections ==
From west to east:

Rural municipality	Location	km	mi	Destinations	Notes
McKillop No. 220	Rowan's Ravine Provincial Park	0.0	0.0	Parking Lot	Western terminus
McKillop No. 220	Rowan's Ravine Provincial Park	1.2	0.75	Rowan's Ravine Provincial Park main gate	
McKillop No. 220	Uhl's Bay	2.6	1.6	Highway 731 east – Collingwood Lakeshore Estates, Maple Grove, Strasbourg; Range Road 2233 – Uhl's Bay	Western end of Hwy 731 concurrency
McKillop No. 220	Uhl's Bay	3.1	1.9	Uhl's Street – Uhl's Bay	
McKillop No. 220	Uhl's Bay	3.7	2.3	Highway 731 west (Island View Road) – Island View, North Colesdale Park, Colesdale Park, Sunset Resort, Green Acres	Eastern end of Hwy 731 concurrency
McKillop No. 220		7.7	4.8	Highway 322 south – Silton	Northern terminus of Hwy 322; western end of unpaved section
McKillop No. 220	Bulyea	22.2	13.8	Highway 20 – Strasbourg, Lumsden	Eastern terminus; eastern end of unpaved section; road continues east as Township Road 234
1.000 mi = 1.609 km; 1.000 km = 0.621 mi: Concurrency terminus

== See also ==
- Transportation in Saskatchewan
- Roads in Saskatchewan
