= Etters Beach =

Resort village in Saskatchewan, Canada

- Resort village
- Resort Village of Etters Beach
- Location within Saskatchewan Location within Canada
- Coordinates: 51°14′06″N 105°17′56″W
- Country: Canada
- Province: Saskatchewan
- Census division: 11
- Rural municipality: Big Arm No. 251
- Incorporated: October 1, 1965

Government
  - Mayor: Ryan Shaw
  - Governing body: Resort Village Council

Area (2016)
  - Land: 0.12 km^{2} (0.046 sq mi)

Population (2021)
  - Total: 40
  - Density: 153.8/km^{2} (398/sq mi)
- Time zone: CST
- Postal code: S0G 2J0
- Area codes: 306 and 639
- Waterway(s): Last Mountain Lake
- Website: Official website

Etters Beach (2021 population: 40) is a resort village in the Canadian province of Saskatchewan within Census Division No. 11. It is on the western shore of Last Mountain Lake in the Rural Municipality of Big Arm No. 251.

== History ==
Etters Beach incorporated as a resort village on October 1, 1965.

== Government ==
The resort village of Etters Beach is governed by an elected municipal council and an appointed clerk. The mayor is Ryan Shaw and its Administrator Joslin Freeman.

== Parks and recreation ==
Etters Beach Recreation Site Campground (51.2355°N 105.3001°W) is adjacent to the village. The recreation site features 12 daily rental campsites serviced with 30-amp electricity and water plus 29 seasonal campsites. There's also a large area with un-electrified campsites. All campsites have a view of Last Mountain Lake. The beach area offers sandy beaches, swimming, boating, and fishing.

On the south side of the village is 9-hole Etters Beach Golf Club.

North of Etters Beach, at the north end of Last Mountain Lake, is Last Mountain Lake Bird Sanctuary, the oldest bird sanctuary in North America.

== Demographics ==
Population history (1981–2016)
Year	Pop.	±%
1971	2	—
1976	5	+150.0%
1981		—
1986	7	—
1991	16	+128.6%
1996	4	−75.0%
2001	5	+25.0%
2006	15	+200.0%
2011	30	+100.0%
2016	30	+0.0%
2021	40	+33.3%
Source: Statistics Canada via Saskatchewan Bureau of Statistics

In the 2021 Census of Population conducted by Statistics Canada, Etters Beach had a population of 40 living in 24 of its 119 total private dwellings, a change of 33.3% from its 2016 population of 30. With a land area of 0.26 km^{2} (0.10 sq mi), it had a population density of 153.8/km^{2} (398.5/sq mi) in 2021.

In the 2016 census conducted by Statistics Canada, the Resort Village of Etters Beach recorded a population of 30 living in 13 of its 114 total private dwellings, a 0% change from its 2011 population of 30. With a land area of 0.27 km^{2} (0.10 sq mi), it had a population density of 111.1/km^{2} in 2016.

== See also ==
- List of communities in Saskatchewan
- List of resort villages in Saskatchewan
- List of villages in Saskatchewan
- List of summer villages in Alberta
