= Saskatchewan Beach =

Resort village in Saskatchewan, Canada

- Resort village
- Resort Village of Saskatchewan Beach
- Location within Saskatchewan Location within Canada
- Coordinates: 50.796°N 104.929°W
- Country: Canada
- Province: Saskatchewan
- Census division: 6
- Rural municipality: McKillop No. 220
- Incorporated: June 16, 1919

Government
  - Mayor: Harvey McEwen
  - Governing body: Resort Village Council
  - Administrator: Sharie Hall

Area (2021)
  - Land: 1.57 km^{2} (0.61 sq mi)

Population (2021)
  - Total: 322
  - Density: 205.1/km^{2} (531/sq mi)
- Time zone: CST
  - Summer (DST): CST
- Area codes: 306 and 639
- Waterway(s): Last Mountain Lake
- Website: Official website

Saskatchewan Beach (2021 population: 322) is a resort village in the Canadian province of Saskatchewan within Census Division No. 6. It is on the eastern shore of Last Mountain Lake in the Rural Municipality of McKillop No. 220. Access is from Highway 322.

== History ==
Saskatchewan Beach incorporated as a resort village on June 16, 1919.

== Demographics ==
Population history (1941–2021)
Year	Pop.	±%
1941	11	—
1946	16	+45.5%
1951	8	−50.0%
1966	5	−37.5%
1971	9	+80.0%
1976	36	+300.0%
1981	49	+36.1%
1986	72	+46.9%
1991	99	+37.5%
1996	101	+2.0%
2001	120	+18.8%
2006	155	+29.2%
2011	213	+37.4%
2016	258	+21.1%
2021	322	+24.8%
Source: Statistics Canada via Saskatchewan Bureau of Statistics

In the 2021 Census of Population conducted by Statistics Canada, Saskatchewan Beach had a population of 322 living in 145 of its 330 total private dwellings, a change of 24.8% from its 2016 population of 258. With a land area of 1.57 km^{2} (0.61 sq mi), it had a population density of 205.1/km^{2} (531.2/sq mi) in 2021.

In the 2016 Census of Population conducted by Statistics Canada, the Resort Village of Saskatchewan Beach recorded a population of 258 living in 120 of its 348 total private dwellings, a 21.1% change from its 2011 population of 213. With a land area of 1.57 km^{2} (0.61 sq mi), it had a population density of 164.3/km^{2} (425.6/sq mi) in 2016.

== Government ==
The Resort Village of Saskatchewan Beach is governed by an elected municipal council and an appointed administrator that meets on the third Saturday of every month. The mayor is Harvey McEwen and its administrator is Sharie Hall.

== See also ==
- List of communities in Saskatchewan
- List of resort villages in Saskatchewan
- List of villages in Saskatchewan
- List of summer villages in Alberta
