= Rural Municipality of McKillop No. 220 =

Rural municipality in Saskatchewan, Canada

McKillop No. 220 Strassburg No. 220 (1909–1919)
- Rural municipality
- Rural Municipality of McKillop No. 220
- Location of the RM of McKillop No. 220 in Saskatchewan
- Coordinates: 50.927°N 105.085°W
- Country: Canada
- Province: Saskatchewan
- Census division: 6
- SARM division: 2
- Federal riding: Moose Jaw—Lake Centre—Lanigan
- Provincial riding: Last Mountain-Touchwood
- Formed: December 13, 1909
- Name change: July 15, 1919 (from RM of Strassburg No. 220)

Government
  - Reeve: Bob Schmidt
  - Governing body: RM of McKillop No. 220 Council
  - Office location: Bulyea

Area (2016)
  - Land: 668.44 km^{2} (258.09 sq mi)

Population (2016)
  - Total: 732
  - Density: 1.1/km^{2} (2.8/sq mi)
- Time zone: CST
  - Summer (DST): CST
- Postal code: S0G 0L0
- Area codes: 306 and 639
- Website: Official website

The Rural Municipality of McKillop No. 220 (2016 population: 732) is a rural municipality (RM) in the Canadian province of Saskatchewan within Census Division No. 6 and SARM Division No. 2.

== History ==
The RM of Strassburg No. 220 was originally incorporated as a rural municipality on December 13, 1909. Its name was changed to the RM of McKillop No. 220 on July 15, 1919.

== Geography ==
The RM is adjacent to Last Mountain Lake.

=== Communities and localities ===
The following urban municipalities are surrounded by the RM.

Towns

- Strasbourg

Villages

- Bulyea

Resort villages

- Glen Harbour
- Island View
- Pelican Pointe
- Saskatchewan Beach
- Sunset Cove

The following unincorporated communities are within the RM.

Organized hamlets

- Alta Vista
- Colesdale Park
- Collingwood Lakeshore Estates
- MacPheat Park
- Mohr's Beach
- North Colesdale Park
- Sorensen Beach
- Spring Bay
- Uhl's Bay

== Demographics ==
Population history (1981–2016)
Year	Pop.	±%
1981	582	—
1986	629	+8.1%
1991	573	−8.9%
1996	545	−4.9%
2001	517	−5.1%
2006	566	+9.5%
2011	575	+1.6%
2016	732	+27.3%
Source: Statistics Canada via Saskatchewan Bureau of Statistics

In the 2021 Census of Population conducted by Statistics Canada, the RM of McKillop No. 220 had a population of 897 living in 418 of its 730 total private dwellings, a change of 22.5% from its 2016 population of 732. With a land area of 663.9 km^{2} (256.3 sq mi), it had a population density of 1.4/km^{2} (3.5/sq mi) in 2021.

In the 2016 Census of Population, the RM of McKillop No. 220 recorded a population of 732 living in 320 of its 617 total private dwellings, a 27.3% change from its 2011 population of 575. With a land area of 668.44 km^{2} (258.09 sq mi), it had a population density of 1.1/km^{2} (2.8/sq mi) in 2016.

== Government ==
The RM of McKillop No. 220 is governed by an elected municipal council and an appointed administrator that meets on the second Monday of every month. The reeve of the RM is Bob Schmidt while its administrator is Camille Box. The RM's office is located in Bulyea.

== Transportation ==
Rail

- Bulyea Branch C.P.R.—serves Saskatchewan Beach, Silton, Gibbs, Bulyea,
- Brandon-Virden-Saskatoon Section C.P.R.—serves Markinch, Southey, Earl Grey, Bulyea, Strasbourg, Duval, Cymric, Govan.

Roads

- Highway 20—serves Bulyea, Saskatchewan
- Highway 322—serves Silton, Saskatchewan

== See also ==
- List of rural municipalities in Saskatchewan
