= Grandview Beach, Saskatchewan =

Resort village in Saskatchewan, Canada

Grandview Beach
- Resort village
- Resort Village of Grandview Beach
- Location within Saskatchewan Location within Canada
- Coordinates: 50.873°N 105.109°W
- Country: Canada
- Province: Saskatchewan
- Census division: 6
- Rural municipality: Sarnia No. 221
- Incorporated: July 4, 1960

Government
  - Mayor: Lorraine Snell
  - Governing body: Resort Village Council
  - Administrator: Ferne Senft

Area (2021)
  - Land: 0.25 km^{2} (0.097 sq mi)

Population (2021)
  - Total: 118
  - Density: 472/km^{2} (1,220/sq mi)
- Time zone: CST
  - Summer (DST): CST
- Area codes: 306 and 639
- Waterway(s): Last Mountain Lake
- Website: Official website

Grandview Beach (2021 population: 118) is a resort village in the Canadian province of Saskatchewan within Census Division No. 6. It is on the shores of Last Mountain Lake in the Rural Municipality of Sarnia No. 221.

== History ==
Grandview Beach incorporated as a resort village on July 4, 1960.

== Demographics ==
Population history (1961–2021)
Year	Pop.	±%
1961	6	—
1966	2	−66.7%
1971	2	+0.0%
1986	5	+150.0%
1991	28	+460.0%
1996	14	−50.0%
2001	15	+7.1%
2006	35	+133.3%
2011	25	−28.6%
2016	35	+40.0%
2021	118	+237.1%
Source: Statistics Canada via Saskatchewan Bureau of Statistics

In the 2021 Census of Population conducted by Statistics Canada, Grandview Beach had a population of 118 living in 53 of its 158 total private dwellings, a change of 237.1% from its 2016 population of 35. With a land area of 0.25 km^{2} (0.097 sq mi), it had a population density of 472.0/km^{2} (1,222.5/sq mi) in 2021.

In the 2016 Census of Population conducted by Statistics Canada, the Resort Village of Grandview Beach recorded a population of 35 living in 16 of its 172 total private dwellings, a 40% change from its 2011 population of 25. With a land area of 0.25 km^{2} (0.097 sq mi), it had a population density of 140.0/km^{2} (362.6/sq mi) in 2016.

== Government ==
The Resort Village of Grandview Beach is governed by an elected municipal council and an appointed administrator that meets every month. The mayor is Lorraine Snell and its administrator is Ferne Senft.

== See also ==
- List of communities in Saskatchewan
- List of resort villages in Saskatchewan
- List of villages in Saskatchewan
- List of summer villages in Alberta
