= Kannata Valley =

Resort village in Saskatchewan, Canada

- Resort village
- Resort Village of Kannata Valley
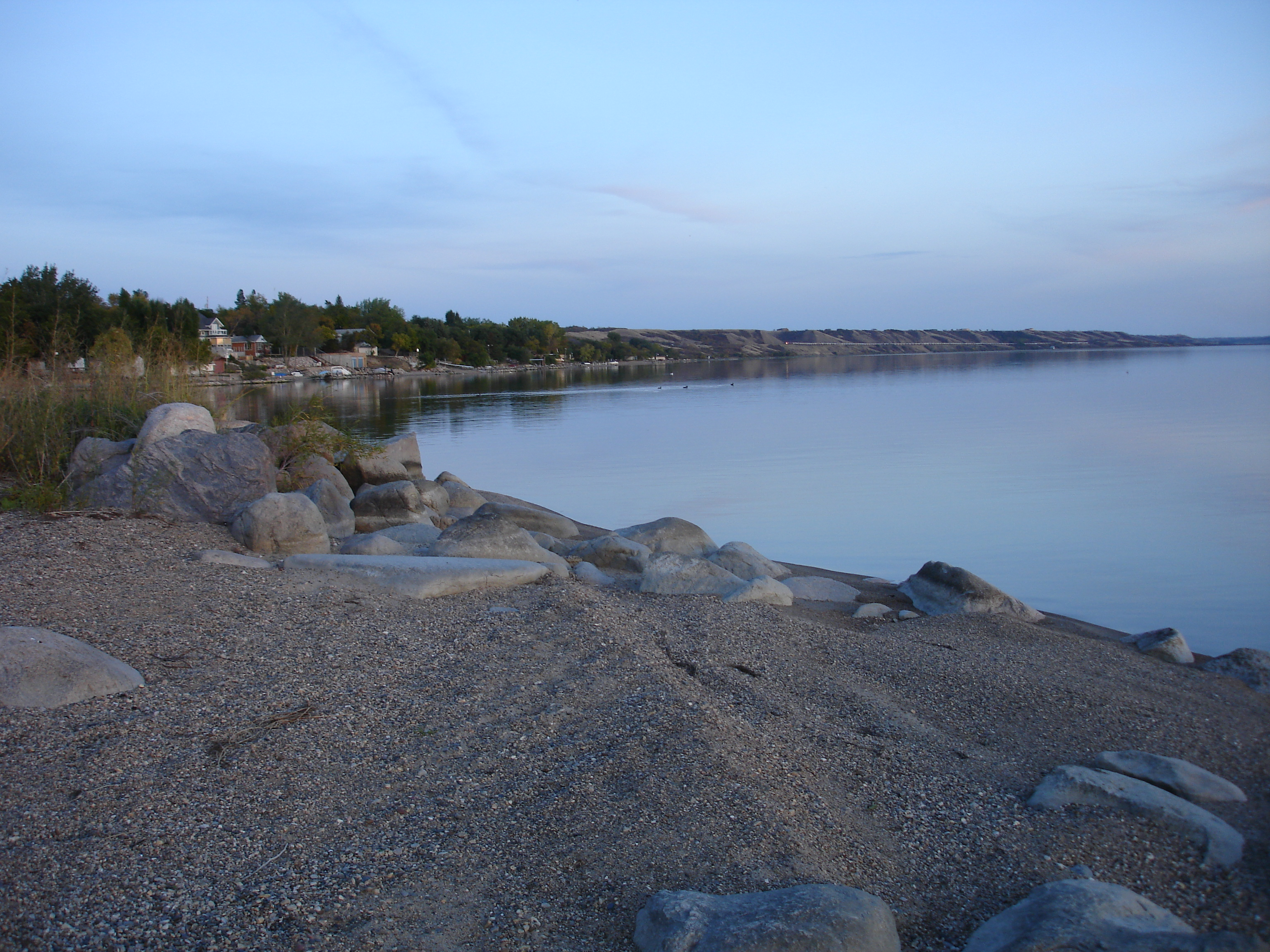
- Beach at Kannata Valley

- Location within Saskatchewan Location within Canada
- Coordinates: 50.784°N 104.903°W
- Country: Canada
- Province: Saskatchewan
- Census division: 6
- Rural municipality: Longlaketon No. 219
- Incorporated: September 1, 1966

Government
  - Mayor: Ken MacDonald
  - Governing body: Resort Village Council
  - Administrator: Darlene Sytnick

Area (2016)
  - Land: 0.63 km^{2} (0.24 sq mi)

Population (2016)
  - Total: 88
  - Density: 139.7/km^{2} (362/sq mi)
- Time zone: CST
  - Summer (DST): CST
- Area codes: 306 and 639
- Waterway(s): Last Mountain Lake
- Website: Official website

Kannata Valley (2016 population: 88) is a resort village in the Canadian province of Saskatchewan within Census Division No. 6. It is on the eastern shore of Last Mountain Lake in the Rural Municipality of Longlaketon No. 219. It is approximately 52 kilometres (32 mi) northwest of Regina. Access is from Highway 322.

== History ==
Kannata Valley incorporated as a resort village on September 1, 1966.

== Demographics ==
Population history (1981–2016)
Year	Pop.	±%
1981	42	—
1986	40	−4.8%
1991	63	+57.5%
1996	83	+31.7%
2001	98	+18.1%
2006	133	+35.7%
2011	101	−24.1%
2016	88	−12.9%
Source: Statistics Canada via Saskatchewan Bureau of Statistics

In the 2021 Census of Population conducted by Statistics Canada, Kannata Valley had a population of 126 living in 64 of its 146 total private dwellings, a change of 43.2% from its 2016 population of 88. With a land area of 0.63 km^{2} (0.24 sq mi), it had a population density of 200.0/km^{2} (518.0/sq mi) in 2021.

In the 2016 Census of Population conducted by Statistics Canada, the Resort Village of Kannata Valley recorded a population of 88 living in 45 of its 132 total private dwellings, a −12.9% change from its 2011 population of 101. With a land area of 0.63 km^{2} (0.24 sq mi), it had a population density of 139.7/km^{2} (361.8/sq mi) in 2016.

== Government ==
The Resort Village of Kannata Valley is governed by an elected municipal council and an appointed administrator that meets on the third Monday of every month. The mayor is Ken MacDonald and its administrator is Darlene Sytnick.

== See also ==
- List of communities in Saskatchewan
- List of resort villages in Saskatchewan
- List of villages in Saskatchewan
- List of summer villages in Alberta
