= List of resort villages in Saskatchewan =

A resort village is a type of incorporated urban municipality in the Canadian province of Saskatchewan. A resort village is created from an organized hamlet by the Minister of Municipal Affairs by ministerial order via section 51 of The Municipalities Act if the community has:

- been an organized hamlet for three or more years;
- a population of 100 or more;
- 50 or more dwellings or businesses; and
- a taxable assessment base that meets a prescribed minimum.

Saskatchewan has 40 resort villages that had a cumulative population of 4,118 and an average population of 103 in the 2011 Census. Saskatchewan's largest and smallest resort villages are Candle Lake and the Lumsden Beach with populations of 765 and 10 respectively.

A resort village council may request the Minister of Municipal Affairs to change its status to a town if the resort village has a population of 500 or more.

== List ==
Name	Rural municipality (RM)	Population (2011)	Population (2006)	Change (%)	Land area (km^{2})	Population density (per km^{2})
Alice Beach	Sarnia No. 221	45	68	−33.8	0.71	63.7
Aquadeo	Meota No. 468	84	123	−31.7	0.74	113.3
Beaver Flat	Excelsior No. 166	40	58	−31	0.92	43.6
Big Shell	Spiritwood No. 496	45	45	0	1.02	44.3
Bird's Point	Fertile Belt No. 183	103	88	17	0.58	177.4
B-Say-Tah	North Qu'Appelle No. 187	187	206	−9.2	1.33	140.3
Candle Lake	Paddockwood No. 520	765	792	−3.4	63.32	12.1
Chitek Lake	Big River No. 555	167	219	−23.7	2.54	65.9
Chorney Beach	Foam Lake No. 276	15	36	−58.3	0.17	89.4
Cochin	Meota No. 468	122	208	−41.3	1.35	90.6
Coteau Beach	Coteau No. 255	40	30	33.3	0.54	74.2
Echo Bay	Spiritwood No. 496	38	77	−50.6	0.8	47.7
Etters Beach	Big Arm No. 251	30	15	100	0.12	253.4
Fort San	North Qu'Appelle No. 187	187	215	−13	2.9	64.6
Glen Harbour	McKillop No. 220	65	73	−11	0.35	185.8
Grandview Beach	Sarnia No. 221	25	35	−28.6	0.25	98.6
Greig Lake	Meadow Lake No. 588	23	20	15	0.14	163.2
Island View	McKillop No. 220	65	88	−26.1	0.43	150.2
Kannata Valley	Longlaketon No. 219	101	133	−24.1	0.63	159.6
Katepwa	Abernethy No. 186	403	285	41.4	5.78	69.7
Kivimaa-Moonlight Bay	Mervin No. 499	84	126	−33.3	0.55	154
Leslie Beach	Foam Lake No. 276	23	30	−23.3	0.56	41.1
Lumsden Beach	Lumsden No. 189	10	40	−75.0	0.47	21.3
Manitou Beach	Morris No. 312	257	233	10.3	3.09	83.1
Melville Beach	Grayson No. 184	27	41	−34.1	0.21	128.6
Metinota	Meota No. 468	89	89	0	0.52	170
Mistusinne	Maple Bush No. 224	66	56	17.9	1.49	44.3
North Grove	Dufferin No. 190	49	68	−27.9	1.03	47.8
Pebble Baye	Leask No. 464	33	27	22.2	0.74	44.4
Pelican Pointe	McKillop No. 220	15	23	−34.8	0.12	125.2
Saskatchewan Beach	McKillop No. 220	213	155	37.4	1.57	135.5
Shields	Dundurn No. 314	220	172	27.9	0.72	304.5
South Lake	Marquis No. 191	48	105	−54.3	1.15	41.9
Sun Valley	Marquis No. 191	80	128	−37.5	2.33	34.3
Sunset Cove	McKillop No. 220	25	26	−3.8	0.17	148.4
Thode	Dundurn No. 314	157	156	0.6	0.73	214.2
Tobin Lake	Moose Range No. 486	90	87	3.4	1.81	49.6
Wakaw Lake	Hoodoo No. 401	30	35	−14.3	0.59	50.9
Wee Too Beach	Sarnia No. 221	35	60	−41.7	0.17	207.8
West End	Fertile Belt No. 183	17	26	−34.6	0.34	50.4
Total resort villages		4,118	4,497	−8.4	102.98	40.0

== Gallery ==
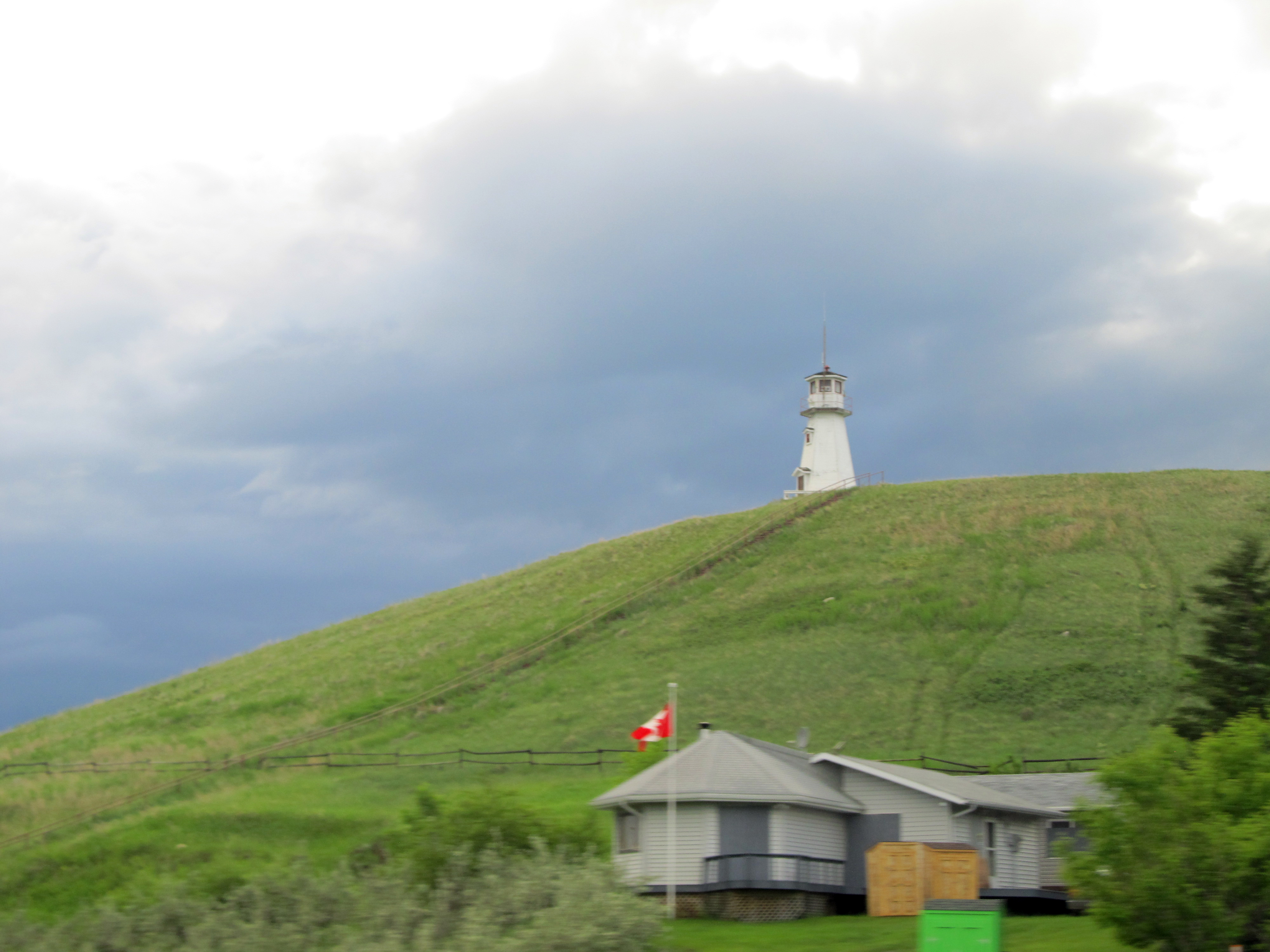
Lighthouse atop Pirot Hill overlooking Jackfish Lake

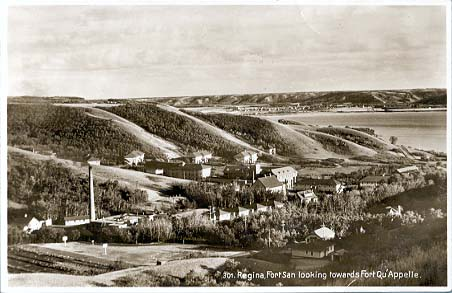
Fort San looking towards Fort Qu'Appelle, 1920s

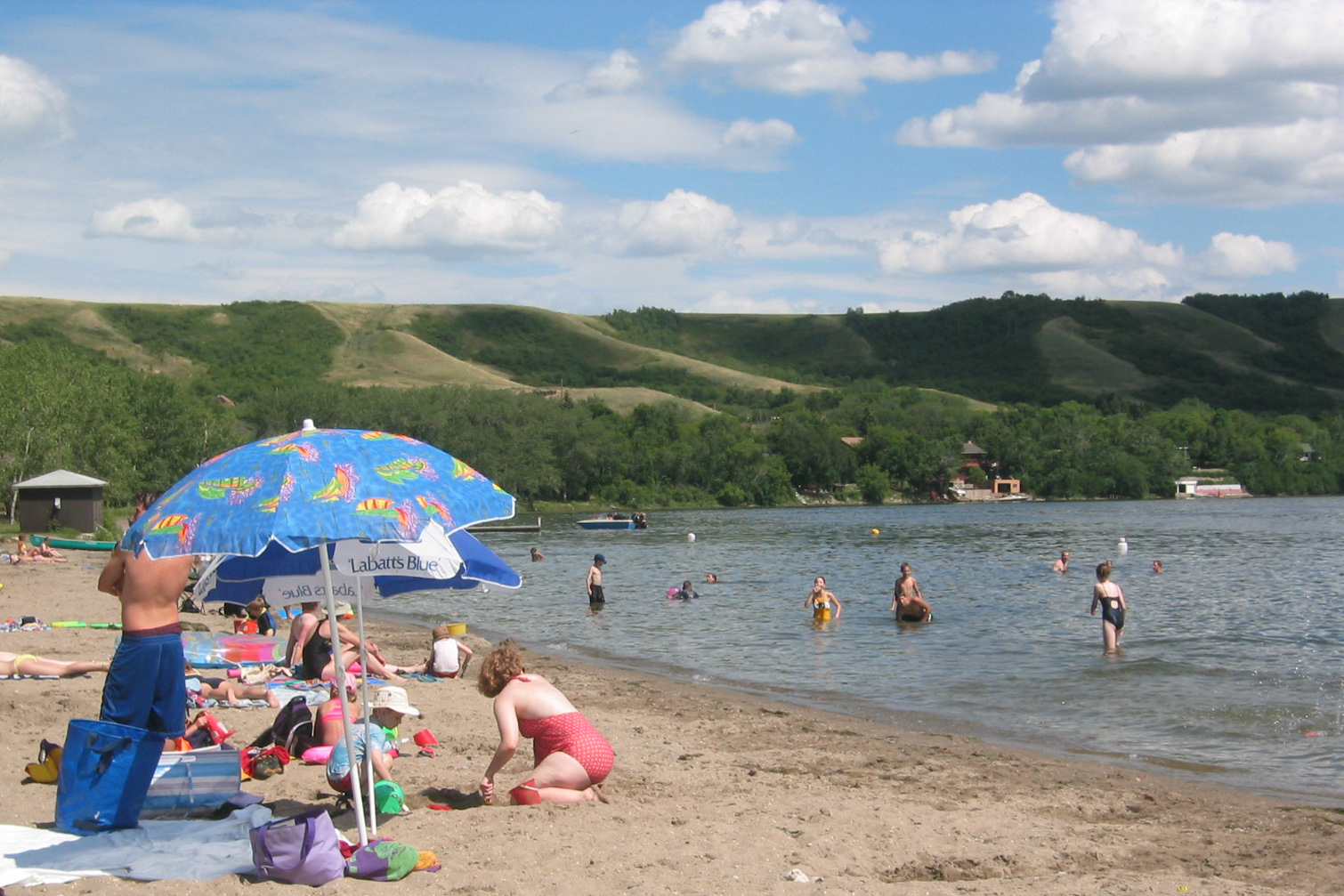
Katepwa Beach

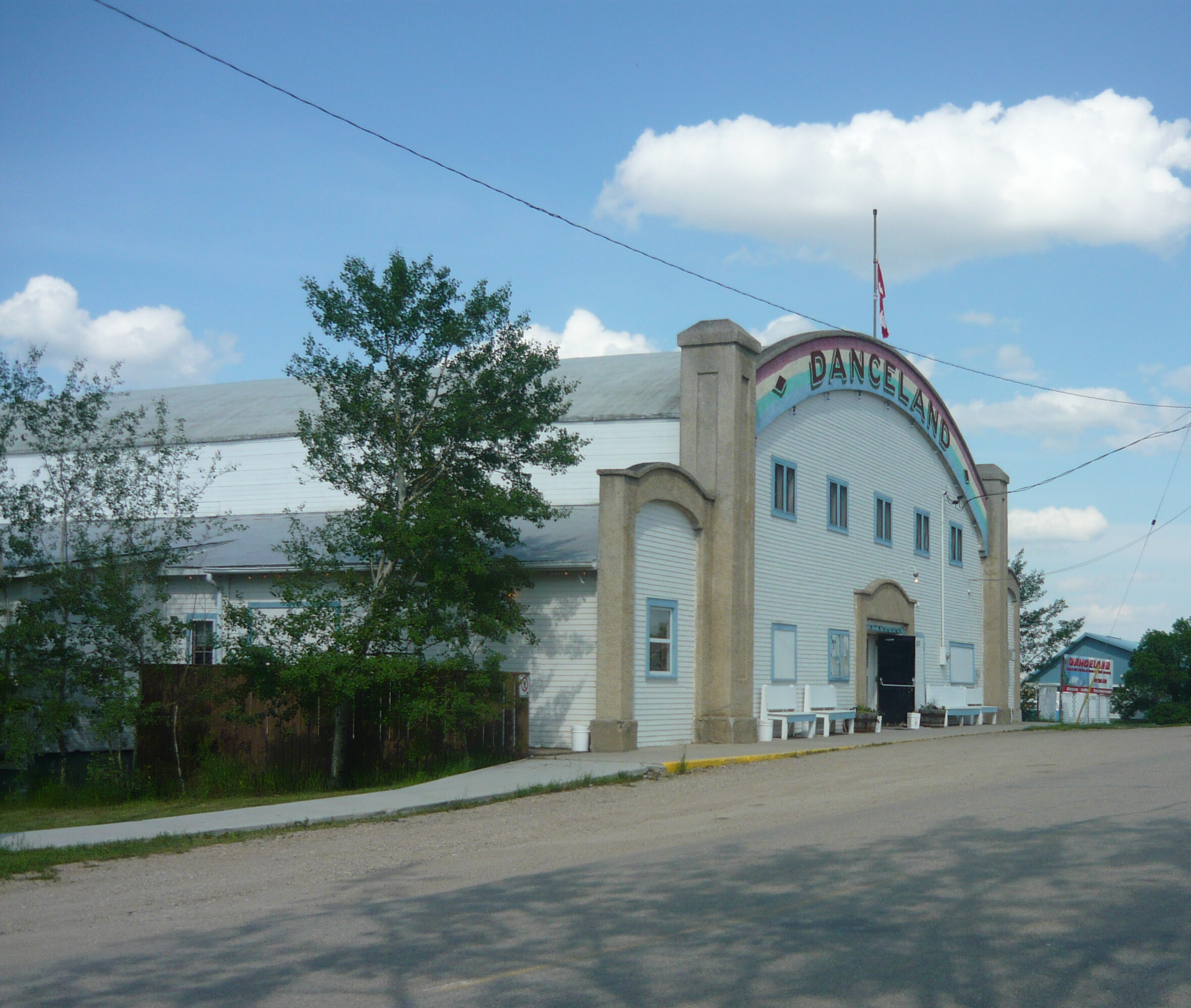
Manitou Beach

== See also ==
- List of communities in Saskatchewan
- List of municipalities in Saskatchewan
