= Sorensen Beach =

Hamlet in Saskatchewan, Canada

Sorensen Beach Sorenson's Beach
- Organized hamlet
- Location within Saskatchewan Location within Canada
- Coordinates: 50.834°N 105.058°W
- Country: Canada
- Province: Saskatchewan
- Census division: 6
- Rural municipality: McKillop No. 220
- Name change: August 28, 2019

Area (2016)
  - Land: 0.17 km^{2} (0.066 sq mi)

Population (2016)
  - Total: 33
  - Density: 198.1/km^{2} (513/sq mi)
- Time zone: UTC-6 (CST)
- Area code: 306
- Highway: Highway 322.

Sorensen Beach, previously referred to as Sorenson's Beach, is an organized hamlet in the Rural Municipality of McKillop No. 220, Saskatchewan, Canada, that is recognized as a designated place by Statistics Canada. It is located on the eastern shore of Last Mountain Lake, approximately 53 kilometres (33 mi) northwest of Regina.

== History ==
The area was originally developed by Marius Andreas "Andy" Sorensen (1882–1964), a local commercial farmer who maintained his farming operations in the Duval/Strasbourg areas. The name of the organized hamlet was changed from Sorenson's Beach to Sorensen Beach on August 28, 2019.

== Demographics ==
In the 2021 Census of Population conducted by Statistics Canada, Sorensen Beach had a population of 44 living in 25 of its 59 total private dwellings, a growth of 33.3% from its 2016 population of 33. With a land area of 0.17 km^{2} (0.066 sq mi), it had a population density of 258.8/km^{2} (670.3/sq mi) in 2021.

== See also ==
- List of communities in Saskatchewan
