= Sunset Cove, Saskatchewan =

Resort village in Saskatchewan, Canada

Sunset Cove
- Resort village
- Resort Village of Sunset Cove
- Location within Saskatchewan Location within Canada
- Coordinates: 50.812°N 105°W
- Country: Canada
- Province: Saskatchewan
- Census division: 6
- Rural municipality: McKillop No. 220
- Incorporated: January 1, 1983

Government
  - Mayor: Tom Fulcher
  - Governing body: Resort Village Council
  - Administrator: Barbara Griffin

Area (2021)
  - Land: 0.17 km^{2} (0.066 sq mi)

Population (2021)
  - Total: 21
  - Density: 123.5/km^{2} (320/sq mi)
- Time zone: CST
  - Summer (DST): CST
- Area codes: 306 and 639
- Waterway(s): Last Mountain Lake

Sunset Cove (2021 population: 21) is a resort village in the Canadian province of Saskatchewan within Census Division No. 6. It is on the eastern shore of Last Mountain Lake in the Rural Municipality of McKillop No. 220. Access is from Highway 322.

== History ==
Sunset Cove incorporated as a resort village on January 1, 1983.

== Demographics ==
Population history (1986–2021)
Year	Pop.	±%
1986	4	—
1991	8	+100.0%
1996	15	+87.5%
2001	24	+60.0%
2006	26	+8.3%
2011	25	−3.8%
2016	18	−28.0%
2021	21	+16.7%
Source: Statistics Canada via Saskatchewan Bureau of Statistics

In the 2021 Census of Population conducted by Statistics Canada, Sunset Cove had a population of 21 living in 11 of its 51 total private dwellings, a change of 16.7% from its 2016 population of 18. With a land area of 0.17 km^{2} (0.066 sq mi), it had a population density of 123.5/km^{2} (319.9/sq mi) in 2021.

In the 2016 Census of Population conducted by Statistics Canada, the Resort Village of Sunset Cove recorded a population of 18 living in 9 of its 50 total private dwellings, a −28% change from its 2011 population of 25. With a land area of 0.17 km^{2} (0.066 sq mi), it had a population density of 105.9/km^{2} (274.2/sq mi) in 2016.

== Government ==
The Resort Village of Sunset Cove is governed by an elected municipal council and an appointed administrator. The mayor is Tom Fulcher and its administrator is Barbara Griffin.

== See also ==
- List of communities in Saskatchewan
- List of resort villages in Saskatchewan
- List of villages in Saskatchewan
- List of summer villages in Alberta
