= Alice Beach =

Village in Saskatchewan, Canada

- Resort village
- Resort Village of Alice Beach
- Location within Saskatchewan Location within Canada
- Coordinates: 50.928°N 105.166°W
- Country: Canada
- Province: Saskatchewan
- Census division: 6
- Rural municipality: Sarnia No. 221
- Incorporated: July 1, 1983

Government
  - Mayor: Ronald Ziegler
  - Governing body: Resort Village Council
  - Administrator: Darlene Mann

Area (2021)
  - Land: 0.71 km^{2} (0.27 sq mi)

Population (2021)
  - Total: 82
  - Density: 115.5/km^{2} (299/sq mi)
- Time zone: CST
  - Summer (DST): CST
- Area codes: 306 and 639
- Highway(s): Highway 733B
- Waterway(s): Last Mountain Lake
- Website: Official website

Alice Beach (2021 population: 82) is a resort village in the Canadian province of Saskatchewan within Census Division No. 6. It is on the shores of Last Mountain Lake in the Rural Municipality of Sarnia No. 221. It is about 65 kilometres (40 mi) northwest of Regina.

== History ==
Alice Beach incorporated as a resort village on July 1, 1983.

== Demographics ==
Population history (1986–2021)
Year	Pop.	±%
1986	21	—
1991	25	+19.0%
1996	34	+36.0%
2001	55	+61.8%
2006	68	+23.6%
2011	45	−33.8%
2016	51	+13.3%
2021	82	+60.8%
Source: Statistics Canada via Saskatchewan Bureau of Statistics

In the 2021 Census of Population conducted by Statistics Canada, Alice Beach had a population of 82 living in 50 of its 132 total private dwellings, a change of 60.8% from its 2016 population of 51. With a land area of 0.71 km^{2} (0.27 sq mi), it had a population density of 115.5/km^{2} (299.1/sq mi) in 2021.

In the 2016 Census of Population conducted by Statistics Canada, the Resort Village of Alice Beach recorded a population of 51 living in 29 of its 131 total private dwellings, a 13.3% change from its 2011 population of 45. With a land area of 0.71 km^{2} (0.27 sq mi), it had a population density of 71.8/km^{2} (186.0/sq mi) in 2016.

== Government ==
The Resort Village of Alice Beach is governed by an elected municipal council and an appointed administrator that meets on the fourth Monday of every month. The mayor is Ronald Ziegler and its administrator is Darlene Mann.

== See also ==
- List of communities in Saskatchewan
- List of municipalities in Saskatchewan
- List of resort villages in Saskatchewan
- List of villages in Saskatchewan
- List of summer villages in Alberta
