= Lipp's Beach =

Hamlet in Saskatchewan, Canada

Coordinates: 50.562°N 105.101°W

Location of Lipp's Beach in Saskatchewan

Lipp's Beach is a hamlet in the Canadian province of Saskatchewan. It is adjacent to Wee Too Beach on the western shore of Last Mountain Lake.

== See also ==
- List of communities in Saskatchewan
