= Collingwood Lakeshore Estates =

- Organized hamlet
- Organized Hamlet of Collingwood Lakeshore Estates
- Location within Saskatchewan Location within Canada
- Coordinates: 51.026°N 105.207°W
- Country: Canada
- Province: Saskatchewan
- Census division: 6
- Rural municipality (RM): McKillop No. 220

Government
  - Governing body: RM of McKillop No. 220 Council
  - Hamlet board chair: Francesca Carteri-Bitz
- Time zone: UTC-6 (CST)
- Area code: 306
- Website: Official website

Collingwood Lakeshore Estates is an organized hamlet in the Rural Municipality of McKillop No. 220, Saskatchewan, Canada. It is on the eastern shore of Last Mountain Lake approximately 76 km (47 mi) north of Regina.

== Government ==
Collingwood Lakeshore Estates has a three-member organized hamlet board that is chaired by Francesca Carteri-Bitz. The board reports to the Rural Municipality of McKillop No. 220 as its administering municipality.
