= Alta Vista, Saskatchewan =

Community in Saskatchewan, Canada

Coordinates: 50°48′11″N 104°58′03″W

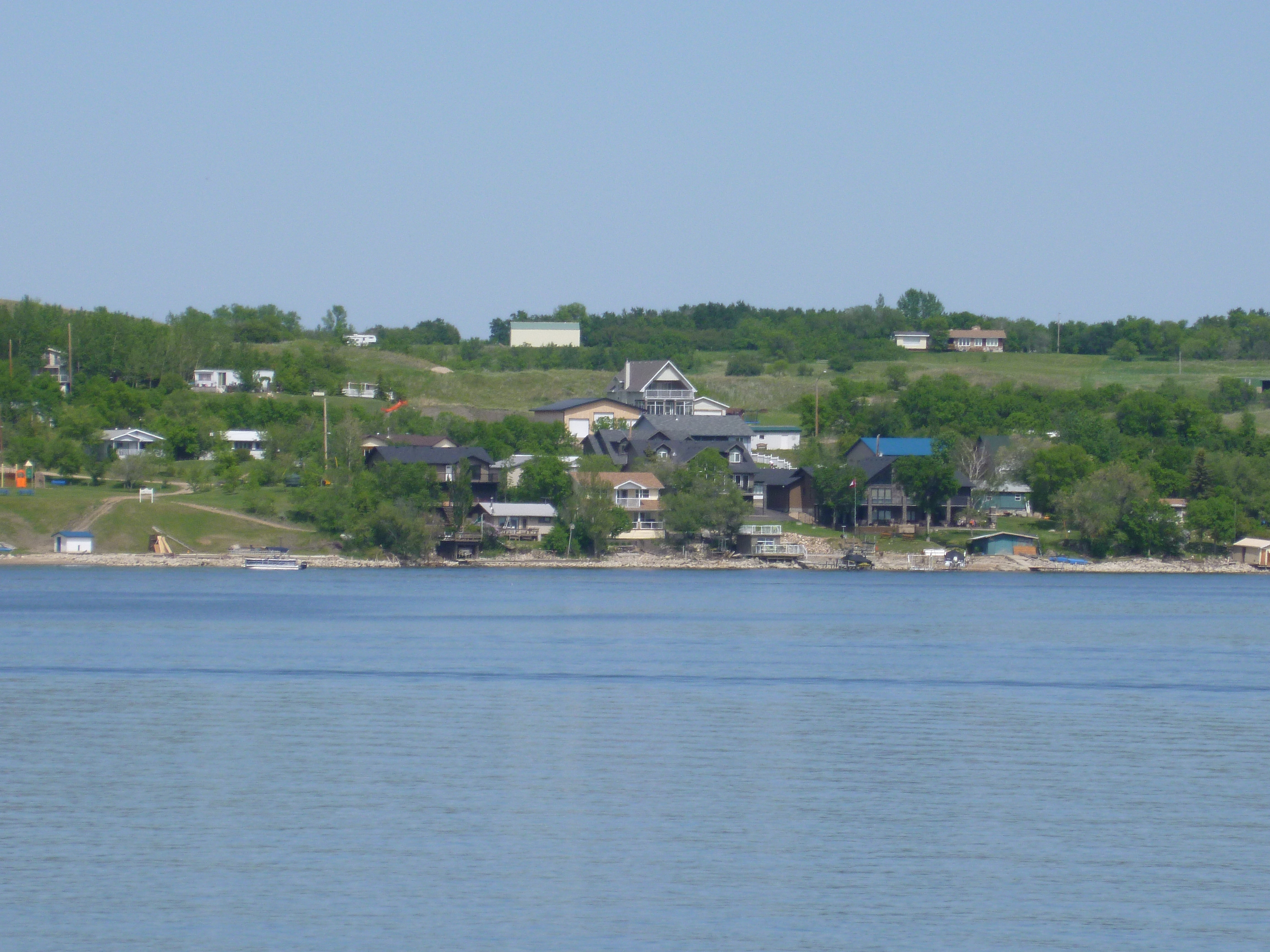
Alta Vista viewed from Regina Beach

Alta Vista is a hamlet in the Canadian province of Saskatchewan. It is located on the eastern shore of Last Mountain Lake within the Rural Municipality of McKillop No. 220, across from Regina Beach. Access is from Highway 322 via Township Road 214.

== Demographics ==
In the 2021 Census of Population conducted by Statistics Canada, Alta Vista had a population of 33 living in 17 of its 32 total private dwellings, a change of -8.3% from its 2016 population of 36. With a land area of 0.14 km^{2} (0.054 sq mi), it had a population density of 235.7/km^{2} (610.5/sq mi) in 2021.

== See also ==
- List of communities in Saskatchewan
