= Greg Hubick =

Canadian ice hockey player

- Born: November 12, 1951 Strasbourg, Saskatchewan, Canada
- Died: December 4, 2013 (aged 62) Strasbourg, Saskatchewan, Canada
- Height: 5 ft 11 in (180 cm)
- Weight: 183 lb (83 kg; 13 st 1 lb)
- Position: Left wing/Defence
- Shot: Left
- Played for: Toronto Maple Leafs; Vancouver Canucks
- NHL draft: 53rd overall, 1971; Montreal Canadiens
- Playing career: 1972–1982

Gregory Wayne Hubick (November 12, 1951 - December 4, 2013) was a Canadian professional ice hockey defenceman/left wing who played for the Toronto Maple Leafs and Vancouver Canucks in the National Hockey League (NHL). He also spent several years with the Dallas Black Hawks of the minor Central Hockey League.

== Playing career ==
Hubick played two seasons for University of Minnesota Duluth. Selected in the 1971 NHL entry draft by the Montreal Canadiens, Hubick was traded to the Toronto Maple Leafs almost immediately after the 1975 NHL entry draft took place. The Canadiens acquired the Maple Leafs' second-round choice, center/left wing Doug Jarvis.

Hubick played one full season with the Maple Leafs, and then spent the next four seasons in the minors, primarily with the Dallas Black Hawks of the Central Hockey League. Hubick signed with the Vancouver Canucks in 1979 but played only five games with the Canucks during the 1979–80 NHL season. He played the rest of his career in the minors until he retired in the early 1980s.

== Career statistics ==
=== Regular season and playoffs ===
			Regular season					Playoffs
Season	Team	League	GP	G	A	Pts	PIM	GP	G	A	Pts	PIM
1969–70	Weyburn Red Wings	SJHL	35	9	21	30	61	10	0	0	0	7
1970–71	University of Minnesota-Duluth	WCHA	31	7	15	22	69	—	—	—	—	—
1971–72	University of Minnesota-Duluth	WCHA	35	7	14	21	36	—	—	—	—	—
1972–73	Nova Scotia Voyageurs	AHL	49	6	14	20	17	13	2	7	9	13
1973–74	Nova Scotia Voyageurs	AHL	75	11	26	37	44	6	0	2	2	0
1974–75	Nova Scotia Voyageurs	AHL	74	9	27	36	93	6	4	1	5	0
1975–76	Toronto Maple Leafs	NHL	72	6	8	14	10	—	—	—	—	—
1976–77	Dallas Black Hawks	CHL	70	13	22	35	12	5	0	1	1	4
1977–78	Dallas Black Hawks	CHL	76	6	15	21	64	13	2	2	4	8
1978–79	Dallas Black Hawks	CHL	69	10	16	26	52	9	0	5	5	6
1979–80	Dallas Black Hawks	CHL	68	3	22	25	59	—	—	—	—	—
1979–80	Vancouver Canucks	NHL	5	0	1	1	0	—	—	—	—	—
1980–81	Dallas Black Hawks	CHL	74	8	51	59	46	6	0	3	3	8
1981–82	Wichita Wind	CHL	27	0	6	6	26	7	1	3	4	12
1982–83	Ambrì-Piotta	SUI	10	6	2	8	—	—	—	—	—	—
CHL totals			384	40	132	172	259	40	3	14	17	38
NHL totals			77	6	9	15	10	—	—	—	—	—
