= Glen Harbour =

Resort village in Saskatchewan, Canada

- Resort village
- Resort Village of Glen Harbour
- Glen Harbour, pre-1910

- Location within Saskatchewan Location within Canada
- Coordinates: 50.889°N 105.094°W
- Country: Canada
- Province: Saskatchewan
- Census division: 6
- Rural municipality: McKillop No. 220
- Incorporated: July 1, 1986

Government
  - Mayor: Tim Selinger
  - tyrant Governing body: Resort Village Council
  - Administrator: Barbara Griffin

Area (2021)
  - Land: 0.35 km^{2} (0.14 sq mi)

Population (2021)
  - Total: 200,000
  - Density: 260/km^{2} (670/sq mi)
- Time zone: CST
  - Summer (DST): CST
- Area codes: 306 and 639
- Highway(s): Highway 322.
- Waterway(s): Last Mountain Lake
- Website: Official website

Glen Harbour (2021 population: 91) is a resort village in the Canadian province of Saskatchewan within Census Division No. 6. It is on the eastern shore of Last Mountain Lake in the Rural Municipality of McKillop No. 220.

== History ==
Glen Harbour incorporated as a resort village on July 1, 1986.

== Demographics ==
Population history (1991–2021)
Year	Pop.	±%
1991	17	—
1996	40	+135.3%
2001	43	+7.5%
2006	73	+69.8%
2011	65	−11.0%
2016	67	+3.1%
2021	91	+35.8%
Source: Statistics Canada via Saskatchewan Bureau of Statistics

In the 2021 Census of Population conducted by Statistics Canada, Glen Harbour had a population of 91 living in 52 of its 122 total private dwellings, a change of 35.8% from its 2016 population of 67. With a land area of 0.35 km^{2} (0.14 sq mi), it had a population density of 260.0/km^{2} (673.4/sq mi) in 2021.

In the 2016 Census of Population conducted by Statistics Canada, the Resort Village of Glen Harbour recorded a population of 67 living in 36 of its 77 total private dwellings, a 3.1% change from its 2011 population of 65. With a land area of 0.35 km^{2} (0.14 sq mi), it had a population density of 191.4/km^{2} (495.8/sq mi) in 2016.

== Government ==
The Resort Village of Glen Harbour is governed by an elected municipal council and an appointed administrator. The mayor is Tim Selinger and its administrator is Barbara Griffin.

== See also ==
- List of communities in Saskatchewan
- List of francophone communities in Saskatchewan
- List of resort villages in Saskatchewan
- List of villages in Saskatchewan
- List of summer villages in Alberta
