= North Grove, Saskatchewan =

North Grove
- Resort village
- Resort Village of North Grove
- Location within Saskatchewan
- Coordinates: 50.69°N 105.557°W
- Country: Canada
- Province: Saskatchewan
- Census division: 6
- Rural municipality: RM of Dufferin No. 190
- Incorporated: January 1, 1989

Government
  - Mayor: David Jukes
  - Governing body: Resort Village Council
  - Administrator: Raena Wilk-Morhart

Area (2016)
  - Land: 1.03 km^{2} (0.40 sq mi)

Population (2016)
  - Total: 132
  - Density: 32.2/km^{2} (83/sq mi)
- Time zone: CST
  - Summer (DST): CST
- Area codes: 306 and 639
- Waterway(s): Buffalo Pound Lake

North Grove (2016 population: 132) is a resort village in the Canadian province of Saskatchewan within Census Division No. 6. It is on the shores of Buffalo Pound Lake in the Rural Municipality of Dufferin No. 190.

== History ==
North Grove incorporated as a resort village on January 1, 1989.

== Demographics ==
Population history (1981–2016)
Year	Pop.	±%
1981		—
1986		—
1991	21	—
1996	15	−28.6%
2001	44	+193.3%
2006	68	+54.5%
2011	49	−27.9%
2016	132	+169.4%
Source: Statistics Canada via Saskatchewan Bureau of Statistics

In the 2021 Census of Population conducted by Statistics Canada, North Grove had a population of 175 living in 82 of its 177 total private dwellings, a change of 32.6% from its 2016 population of 132. With a land area of 3.72 km^{2} (1.44 sq mi), it had a population density of 47.0/km^{2} (121.8/sq mi) in 2021.

In the 2016 Census of Population conducted by Statistics Canada, the Resort Village of North Grove recorded a population of 132 living in 62 of its 165 total private dwellings, a 103.1% change from its 2011 population of 65. With a land area of 4.1 km^{2} (1.6 sq mi), it had a population density of 32.2/km^{2} (83.4/sq mi) in 2016.

== Government ==
The Resort Village of North Grove is governed by an elected municipal council and an appointed administrator. The mayor is David Jukes and its administrator is Raena Wilk-Morhart.

== See also ==
- List of communities in Saskatchewan
- List of municipalities in Saskatchewan
- List of resort villages in Saskatchewan
- List of villages in Saskatchewan
- List of summer villages in Alberta
