= Pelican Pointe =

Resort village in Saskatchewan, Canada

- Resort village
- Resort Village of Pelican Pointe
- Location within Saskatchewan Location within Canada
- Coordinates: 50.804°N 105.037°W
- Country: Canada
- Province: Saskatchewan
- Census division: 6
- Rural municipality: McKillop No. 220
- Incorporated: January 1, 1987

Government
  - Mayor: Jeff Unrau
  - Governing body: Resort Village Council
  - Administrator: Pamela Holliday

Area (2021)
  - Land: 0.12 km^{2} (0.046 sq mi)

Population (2021)
  - Total: 38
  - Density: 316.7/km^{2} (820/sq mi)
- Time zone: CST
  - Summer (DST): CST
- Area codes: 306 and 639
- Waterway(s): Last Mountain Lake

Pelican Pointe (2021 population: 38) is a resort village in the Canadian province of Saskatchewan within Census Division No. 6. It is on the eastern shore of Last Mountain Lake in the Rural Municipality of McKillop No. 220. Access is from Highway 322.

Pelican Pointe is situated on Pelican Point, across the lake from Little Arm Bay and Last Mountain Lake Indian reserve.

== History ==
Pelican Pointe incorporated as a resort village on January 1, 1987.

== Demographics ==
Population history (1991–2021)
Year	Pop.	±%
1991	18	—
1996	19	+5.6%
2001	18	−5.3%
2006	23	+27.8%
2011	15	−34.8%
2016	28	+86.7%
2021	38	+35.7%
Source: Statistics Canada via Saskatchewan Bureau of Statistics

In the 2021 Census of Population conducted by Statistics Canada, Pelican Pointe had a population of 38 living in 22 of its 55 total private dwellings, a change of 35.7% from its 2016 population of 28. With a land area of 0.12 km^{2} (0.046 sq mi), it had a population density of 316.7/km^{2} (820.2/sq mi) in 2021.

In the 2016 Census of Population conducted by Statistics Canada, the Resort Village of Pelican Pointe recorded a population of 28 living in 15 of its 55 total private dwellings, a 86.7% change from its 2011 population of 15. With a land area of 0.12 km^{2} (0.046 sq mi), it had a population density of 233.3/km^{2} (604.3/sq mi) in 2016.

== Government ==
The Resort Village of Pelican Pointe is governed by an elected municipal council and an appointed clerk. The mayor is Steve Mazurak.

== See also ==
- List of communities in Saskatchewan
- List of resort villages in Saskatchewan
- List of villages in Saskatchewan
- List of summer villages in Alberta
