= Nick Schultz (ice hockey) =

Canadian ice hockey player (born 1982)

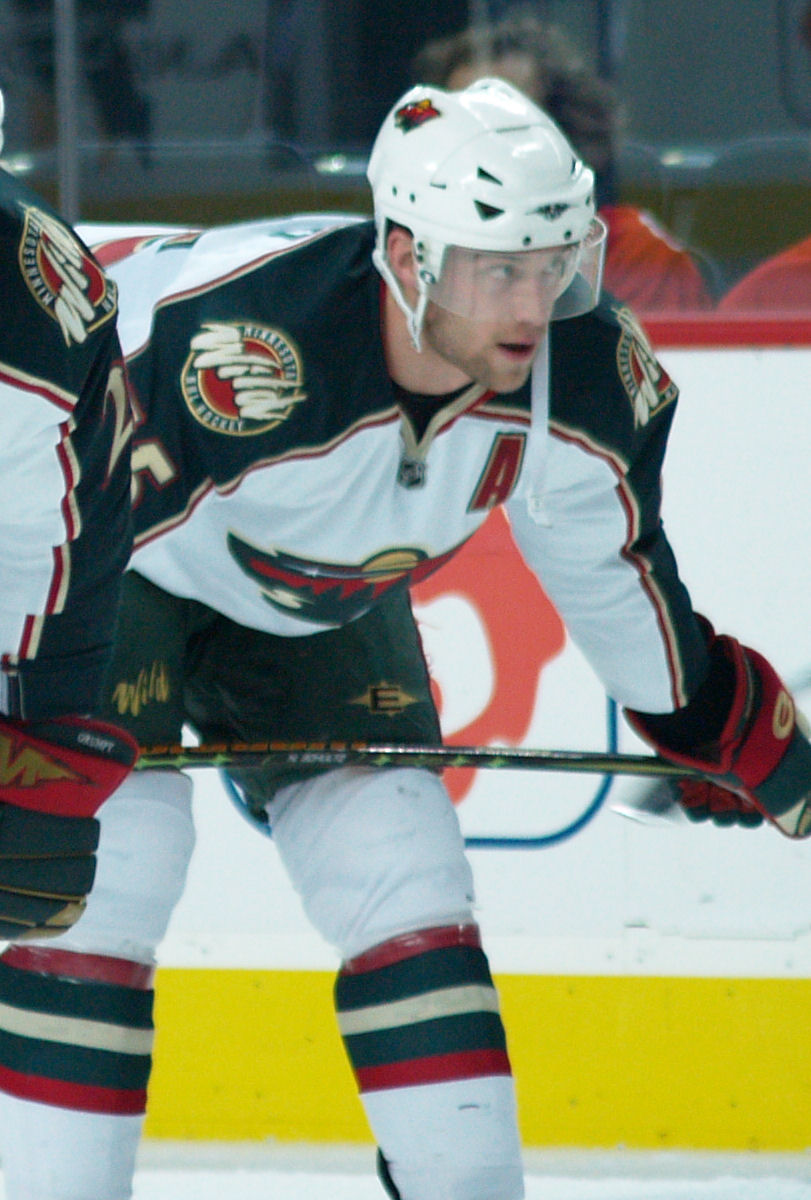
- Schultz with the Minnesota Wild in 2007
- Born: August 25, 1982 (age 43) Strasbourg, Saskatchewan, Canada
- Height: 6 ft 2 in (188 cm)
- Weight: 203 lb (92 kg; 14 st 7 lb)
- Position: Defence
- Shot: Left
- Played for: Minnesota Wild; Kassel Huskies; Edmonton Oilers; Columbus Blue Jackets; Philadelphia Flyers
- National team: Canada
- NHL draft: 33rd overall, 2000; Minnesota Wild
- Playing career: 2001–2017

Nicholas Andrew Schultz (born August 25, 1982) is a Canadian former professional ice hockey defenceman who played 17 seasons in the National Hockey League (NHL) for the Minnesota Wild, Edmonton Oilers, Columbus Blue Jackets, and Philadelphia Flyers. The Minnesota Wild drafted him in the second round (33rd overall) of the 2000 NHL entry draft. He played junior ice hockey for the Prince Albert Raiders of the Western Hockey League (WHL). Schultz represented Canada in international competition at the junior and senior level.

== Playing career ==
=== Minor ===
As a child, Schultz played minor hockey in his hometown of Strasbourg, Saskatchewan for the Maroons. He was selected by the Prince Albert Raiders in the third round (43rd overall) of the 1997 WHL Bantam Draft. Before joining the Raiders, Schultz played for Yorkton Mallers in the Saskatchewan Male U18 AAA Hockey League (SMAAAHL). During his only season in the SMAAAHL, Schultz was named Rookie of the Year for the Mallers club, as well as being named the top defenceman and most valuable player (MVP) of the league's all-star game.

=== Junior ===
Schultz made his debut for the Raiders in the 1998–99 WHL season, playing in 58 games, scoring five goals and adding 18 assists. In his sophomore season in the Western Hockey League (WHL), he played in 72 games, scoring 11 goals and adding 33 assists. After the 1999–2000 season, Schultz was named the Raiders top defenceman and most improved player. The Minnesota Wild selected Schultz in the second round (33rd overall) of the 2000 NHL entry draft. Schultz served as team captain for the 2000–01 season, playing 59 games, scoring 17 goals and adding 30 assists.

=== Professional ===
After the Raiders' 2000–01 WHL season was complete, Schultz made his professional debut with the Cleveland Lumberjacks of the International Hockey League (IHL), suiting up for four games, where he scored a goal and added an assist. The next season, Schultz made his National Hockey League (NHL) debut, after making the Wild out of training camp. He made his NHL debut against the Edmonton Oilers on October 14, 2001. During his rookie season, Schultz played in 52 games, scoring four goals and adding six assists. After the Wild's season was complete, Schultz joined the Houston Aeros of the American Hockey League (AHL) for the Calder Cup playoffs. On February 27, 2012, Schultz was traded to the Edmonton Oilers in exchange for Tom Gilbert. Schultz is currently 2nd in all-time games played for the Minnesota Wild with 743 games played.

On March 5, 2014, Schultz was traded to the Columbus Blue Jackets in exchange for a fifth-round pick.

Schultz's tenure with the Blue Jackets was kept brief when on July 2, 2014, Schultz joined his fourth NHL club, signing a one-year deal as a free agent with the Philadelphia Flyers. On February 18, 2015, the Flyers re-signed Schultz to a two-year deal worth $2.25 million annually.

== International play ==
Medal record

Representing Canada

Men's ice hockey

World Championships
Gold medal – first place	2007 Russia	
Gold medal – first place	2004 Czech Republic	

World Junior Championships
Silver medal – second place	2002 Czech Republic	
Bronze medal – third place	2001 Sweden	

Schultz represented Saskatchewan at the 1999 Canada Winter Games.

== Personal life ==
Schultz grew up on his family's farm in Strasbourg, Saskatchewan. He has two older brothers, one of whom, Kris, played professional ice hockey in the Central Hockey League (CHL) and United Hockey League (UHL). One of his brothers is named Terrence and his parents' names are Robert and Carol. His cousin Jesse Schultz made his NHL debut in the 2006–07 season, playing for the Vancouver Canucks. Schultz and his wife have one son and two daughters. They make their home in Calgary. Jessica's sister is also married to NHL player Cory Sarich, last of the Colorado Avalanche. Schultz is friends with Jarret Stoll and is often present at Stoll's yearly charity golf tournament.

On June 26, 2019, Schultz was hired by the Philadelphia Flyers as a player development coach.

== Awards ==
- Played in the NHL YoungStars Game in 2002–03

== Career statistics ==
=== Regular season and playoffs ===
			Regular season					Playoffs
Season	Team	League	GP	G	A	Pts	PIM	GP	G	A	Pts	PIM
1998–99	Prince Albert Raiders	WHL	58	5	18	23	37	14	0	7	7	0
1999–2000	Prince Albert Raiders	WHL	72	11	33	44	38	6	0	3	3	2
2000–01	Prince Albert Raiders	WHL	59	17	30	47	120	—	—	—	—	—
2000–01	Cleveland Lumberjacks	IHL	4	1	1	2	2	3	0	1	1	0
2001–02	Minnesota Wild	NHL	52	4	6	10	14	—	—	—	—	—
2001–02	Houston Aeros	AHL	—	—	—	—	—	14	1	5	6	2
2002–03	Minnesota Wild	NHL	75	3	7	10	23	18	0	1	1	10
2003–04	Minnesota Wild	NHL	79	6	10	16	16	—	—	—	—	—
2004–05	Kassel Huskies	DEL	46	7	15	22	26	—	—	—	—	—
2005–06	Minnesota Wild	NHL	79	2	12	14	43	—	—	—	—	—
2006–07	Minnesota Wild	NHL	82	2	10	12	42	5	0	1	1	0
2007–08	Minnesota Wild	NHL	81	2	13	15	42	1	0	0	0	0
2008–09	Minnesota Wild	NHL	79	2	9	11	31	—	—	—	—	—
2009–10	Minnesota Wild	NHL	80	1	19	20	43	—	—	—	—	—
2010–11	Minnesota Wild	NHL	74	3	14	17	38	—	—	—	—	—
2011–12	Minnesota Wild	NHL	62	1	2	3	30	—	—	—	—	—
2011–12	Edmonton Oilers	NHL	20	0	4	4	10	—	—	—	—	—
2012–13	Edmonton Oilers	NHL	48	1	8	9	24	—	—	—	—	—
2013–14	Edmonton Oilers	NHL	60	0	4	4	24	—	—	—	—	—
2013–14	Columbus Blue Jackets	NHL	9	0	1	1	4	2	0	0	0	0
2014–15	Philadelphia Flyers	NHL	80	2	13	15	47	—	—	—	—	—
2015–16	Philadelphia Flyers	NHL	81	1	9	10	42	6	0	0	0	2
2016–17	Philadelphia Flyers	NHL	28	0	4	4	10	—	—	—	—	—
NHL totals			1,069	30	145	175	483	32	0	2	2	12

=== International ===
Year	Team	Event	Result	GP	G	A	Pts	PIM
2001	Canada	WJC	3rd place, bronze medalist(s)	7	0	0	0	2
2002	Canada	WJC	2nd place, silver medalist(s)	7	0	2	2	4
2004	Canada	WC	1st place, gold medalist(s)	9	0	1	1	0
2006	Canada	WC	4th	9	0	2	2	6
2007	Canada	WC	1st place, gold medalist(s)	9	0	0	0	2
Junior totals				14	0	2	2	6
Senior totals				27	0	3	3	8

Sporting positions
Preceded by Mark Parrish	Minnesota Wild captain January 2008	Succeeded by Mikko Koivu
