= Touchwood Hills Post Provincial Park =

Historic trading outpost and current provincial park in Saskatchewan, Canada

- Location within Saskatchewan Location within Canada
- 51.3634°N 104.0964°W
- Location: Saskatchewan, Canada

History
- Built: 1879
- Original use: Trading post

Site notes
- Current use: Historic site / museum
- Governing body: Sask Parks
- Owner

National Historic Site of Canada
- Official name: Touchwood Hills Post Provincial Park
- Designated: 1986

Touchwood Hills Post Provincial Park is the location of a former Hudson's Bay Company (HBC) fur trading post that existed from 1879 to 1909 in the Touchwood Uplands of the Canadian province of Saskatchewan. In 1986, the site was designated a provincial park. It is located along Highway 15 in the RM of Kellross No. 247, about 10 kilometres (6.2 mi) west of Lestock and 16 kilometres (9.9 mi) east of Punnichy.

The park is 6.76 hectares (16.7 acres) in size and consists of cellar depressions and other archaeological remains from the historic post, including the remnants of the marks left by Red River carts on this segment of the Carlton Trail. There is also a plaque and concrete markers outlining the locations of the original buildings. It is a day-use site only as there are only picnic tables and no other services. Another notable fur trading post, Last Mountain House, is located 75 kilometres (47 mi) to the west on Last Mountain Lake.

== History ==
The Touchwood Hills Post was one of the few Hudson Bay Company trading posts that was not located on a river and supplied by canoe as it was a re-supply point on the part of the Carlton Trail which ran from Fort Ellice on the Assiniboine River north-west to Fort Carlton on the North Saskatchewan River. The section of the Carlton Trail that went from the Touchwood Hills to the Fishing Lakes was called the Fort Qu'Appelle-Touchwood Hills Trail. The post was originally built by Thomas Taylor in September 1852 north of the current park in the "Big" Touchwood Hills and it was part of the Swan River District managed from Fort Pelly. About 10 years later, the post was moved south a few miles to the Little Touchwood Hills. Approximately 14 years later, in 1879, it was moved a short distance north-east to the current location.

The Touchwood Hills Post was an important trading post due to its location along the Carlton Trail. While it traded in a variety of goods, such as beaver and muskrat fur and buffalo products, such as robes, fresh and dried meat, and pemmican, the main purpose was to acquire and distribute provisions for Hudson's Bay Company operations in the North-West Territories. The local First Nations supplied most of the goods for the post. In 1882, the Dominion Telegraph line was built alongside the Carlton Trail resulting in an increased importance of the post by making it a communications hub.

By 1895 the local First Nations had been largely settled on Indian reserves and Touchwood Hills Post became more of a general store and post office for the locals. It was closed in 1909 due to competition from the Grand Trunk Pacific Railway, which was completed nearby the year before.

== See also ==
- List of Hudson's Bay Company trading posts
- List of historic places in rural municipalities of Saskatchewan
- List of protected areas of Saskatchewan
- North American fur trade
- Assiniboine River fur trade
