= MacPheat Park =

Community in Saskatchewan, Canada

- Organized hamlet
- Organized Hamlet of MacPheat Park
- Location within Saskatchewan Location within Canada
- Coordinates: 50.906°N 105.102°W
- Country: Canada
- Province: Saskatchewan
- Census division: 6
- Rural municipality (RM): McKillop No. 220

Government
  - Governing body: RM of McKillop No. 220 Council
  - Hamlet board chair: Doug Clark
- Time zone: UTC-6 (CST)
- Area code: 306
- Website: Official website

MacPheat Park is an organized hamlet in the Rural Municipality of McKillop No. 220, Saskatchewan, Canada. It is on the eastern shore of Last Mountain Lake approximately 61 kilometres (38 mi) north of Regina.

== Government ==
MacPheat Park has a three-member organized hamlet board, chaired by Doug Clark. The board reports to the Rural Municipality of McKillop No. 220 as its administering municipality.

== See also ==
- List of communities in Saskatchewan
