= Wee Too Beach =

Resort village in Saskatchewan, Canada

- Resort village
- Resort Village of Wee Too Beach
- Location within Saskatchewan Location within Canada
- Coordinates: 50.938°N 105.173°W
- Country: Canada
- Province: Saskatchewan
- Census division: 6
- Rural municipality: Sarnia No. 221
- Incorporated: January 1, 1986

Government
  - Mayor: Kevin Peachey
  - Governing body: Resort Village Council
  - Administrator: Pamela Holliday

Area (2021)
  - Land: 0.17 km^{2} (0.066 sq mi)

Population (2021)
  - Total: 75
  - Density: 441.2/km^{2} (1,143/sq mi)
- Time zone: CST
  - Summer (DST): CST
- Area codes: 306 and 639
- Highway(s): Highway 733B
- Waterway(s): Last Mountain Lake
- Website: www.weetoobeach2.com

Wee Too Beach (2021 population: 75) is a resort village in the Canadian province of Saskatchewan within Census Division No. 6. It is on the shores of Last Mountain Lake in the Rural Municipality of Sarnia No. 221.

== History ==
Wee Too Beach incorporated as a resort village on January 1, 1986.

== Demographics ==
Population history (1986–2021)
Year	Pop.	±%
1986	11	—
1991	10	−9.1%
1996	10	+0.0%
2001	20	+100.0%
2006	60	+200.0%
2011	35	−41.7%
2016	79	+125.7%
2021	75	−5.1%
Source: Statistics Canada via Saskatchewan Bureau of Statistics

In the 2021 Census of Population conducted by Statistics Canada, Wee Too Beach had a population of 75 living in 33 of its 105 total private dwellings, a change of −5.1% from its 2016 population of 79. With a land area of 0.17 km^{2} (0.066 sq mi), it had a population density of 441.2/km^{2} (1,142.6/sq mi) in 2021.

In the 2016 Census of Population conducted by Statistics Canada, the Resort Village of Wee Too Beach recorded a population of 79 living in 45 of its 140 total private dwellings, a 125.7% change from its 2011 population of 35. With a land area of 0.17 km^{2} (0.066 sq mi), it had a population density of 464.7/km^{2} (1,203.6/sq mi) in 2016.

== Government ==
The Resort Village of Wee Too Beach is governed by an elected municipal council and an appointed administrator that meets on the last Tuesday of every month. The mayor is Kevin Peachey and its administrator is Pamela Holliday.

== See also ==
- List of communities in Saskatchewan
- List of francophone communities in Saskatchewan
- List of resort villages in Saskatchewan
- List of villages in Saskatchewan
- List of summer villages in Alberta
