= Earl Grey, Saskatchewan =

Village in Saskatchewan, Canada

Earl Grey
- Village
- Village of Earl Grey
- Location of Earl Grey Earl Grey (Canada)
- Coordinates: 50°56′08″N 104°42′40″W
- Country: Canada
- Province: Saskatchewan
- Region: Central
- Census division: 6
- Rural Municipality: Longlaketon No. 219
- Post office Founded: 1905-10-16
- Incorporated (Village): 1906

Government
  - Type: Municipal
  - Governing body: Earl Grey Village Council
  - Mayor: Debbie Hupka-Butz
  - Administrator: Courtney Wiers

Population (2006)
  - Total: 246
  - Density: 187.7/km^{2} (486/sq mi)
- Time zone: UTC-6 (CST)
- Postal code: S0G 1J0
- Area code: 306
- Highways: Highway 22 Highway 641
- Railways: Canadian Pacific Railway (abandoned)

Earl Grey (2016 population: 246) is a village in the Canadian province of Saskatchewan within the Rural Municipality of Longlaketon No. 219 and Census Division No. 6. The village is located approximately 67 kilometres (42 mi) north of the city of Regina.

The area was first settled in 1901 by Paul Henderson, younger brother of Jack Henderson, hangman of Louis Riel. Subsequent to Paul Henderson's death from exposure in 1903, other settlers followed; in 1906 the village was incorporated and named "Earl Grey" after Albert Grey, 4th Earl Grey, Canada's Governor General at the time.

Currently, the town has two churches (Christ Lutheran Church [ELCIC] and a United Church), one Kingdom Hall of Jehovah's Witnesses, several old-age homes, a hotel, a curling rink, and a veterinary clinic. A small statue of a grain elevator is displayed in the downtown area, a commemorative tribute to the village's once-thriving grain economy.

The public school was downsized to a Kindergarten-Grade 8 school in the 2003–2004 school year, before closing completely in 2007.

== History ==
Earl Grey incorporated as a village on July 27, 1906.

== Demographics ==
Population history (1981–2016)
Year	Pop.	±%
1981	303	—
1986	320	+5.6%
1991	289	−9.7%
1996	268	−7.3%
2001	292	+9.0%
2006	264	−9.6%
2011	239	−9.5%
2016	246	+2.9%
Source: Statistics Canada via Saskatchewan Bureau of Statistics

In the 2021 Census of Population conducted by Statistics Canada, Earl Grey had a population of 229 living in 120 of its 134 total private dwellings, a change of −6.9% from its 2016 population of 246. With a land area of 1.35 km^{2} (0.52 sq mi), it had a population density of 169.6/km^{2} (439.3/sq mi) in 2021.

In the 2016 Census of Population, the Village of Earl Grey recorded a population of 246 living in 118 of its 121 total private dwellings, a 2.8% change from its 2011 population of 239. With a land area of 1.31 km^{2} (0.51 sq mi), it had a population density of 187.8/km^{2} (486.4/sq mi) in 2016.

== See also ==
- List of communities in Saskatchewan
- List of villages in Saskatchewan
