= Last Mountain House Provincial Park =

Former HBC trading post and current provincial park in Saskatchewan, Canada

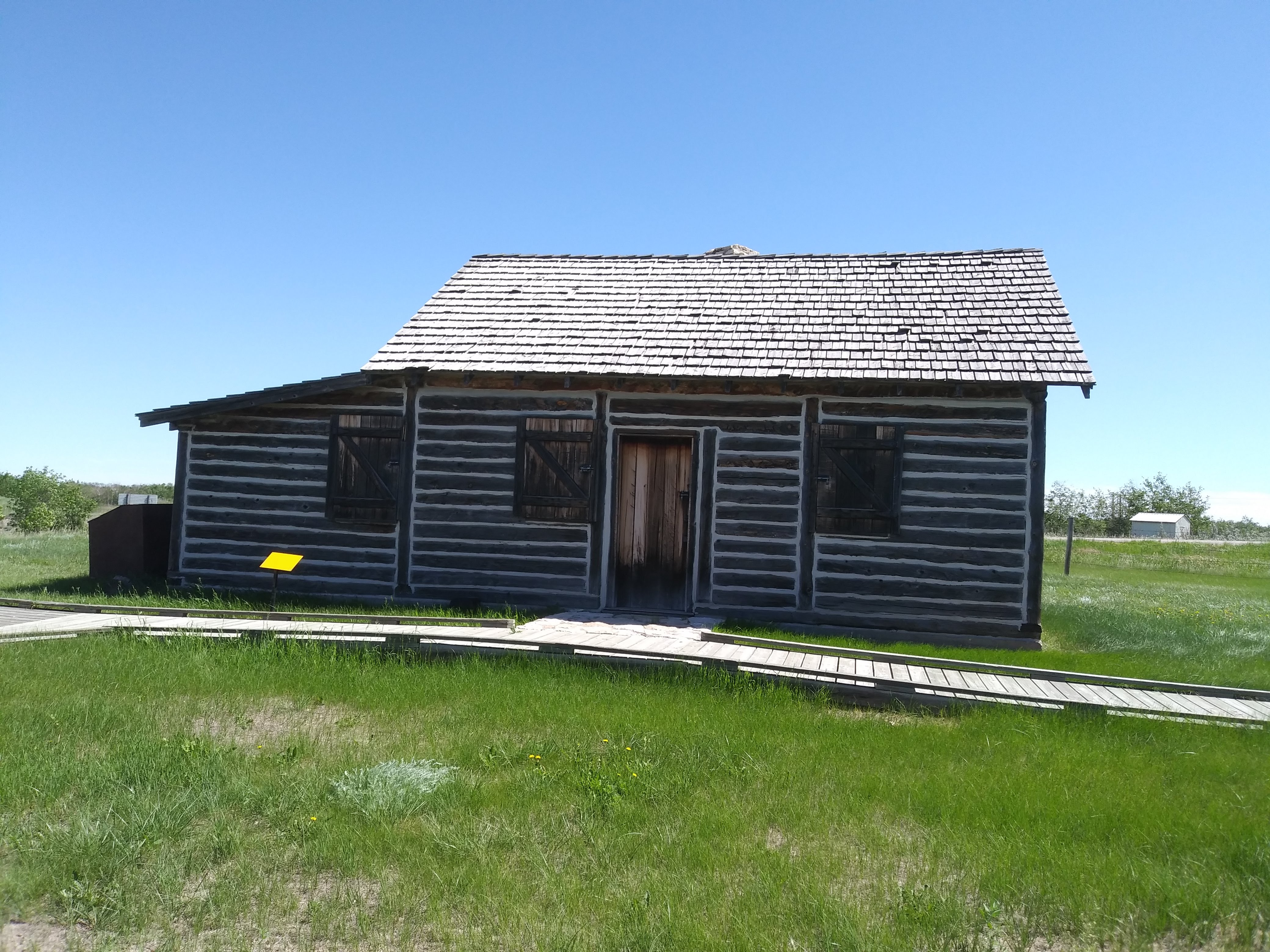
- Postmaster managers quarters

- Location within Saskatchewan Location within Canada
- 50°46′15″N 104°52′51″W
- Location: Saskatchewan, Canada

History
- Built: 1869
- Original use: Trading post

Site notes
- Current use: Historic site / museum
- Governing body: Sask Parks
- Owner

National Historic Site of Canada
- Official name: Last Mountain House
- Designated: 1986

Last Mountain House Provincial Park is a provincial park in the Canadian province of Saskatchewan in the RM of Longlaketon. The park is located on the southern end on the eastern shore of Last Mountain Lake, the largest natural lake in southern Saskatchewan.

"Last Mountain House", the main feature of the park, was a Hudson's Bay Company (HBC) trading post from 1869 to 1871. It was a branch of Fort Qu'Appelle, 75 kilometres (47 mi) east and was about 85 kilometres (53 mi) south-west of Touchwood Hills Post. It was founded in part to compete with the increasing number of independent traders in the area and because the buffalo had moved south from the Touchwood Hills. Unlike most HBC posts it had no stockade. The first season was successful, producing around 1,000 buffalo robes. In the second year of operation the buffalo had moved further south and there was a serious shortage of pemmican. Some time after the second season, the post was destroyed by fire and was not rebuilt. The House was located on the east side of Last Mountain Lake about a mile north of the lake's outlet 7 kilometres (4.3 mi) north-west of Craven, and about 40 kilometres (25 mi) north-west of Regina.

Last Mountain House is on the Canadian Register of Historic Places. It was placed on the register on 26 May 1986.

== See also ==
- Tourism in Saskatchewan
- List of protected areas of Saskatchewan
- List of historic places in rural municipalities of Saskatchewan
- List of historic places in Saskatchewan
