= Mohr's Beach =

Hamlet in Saskatchewan, Canada

Coordinates: 50°52′58″N 105°05′32″W

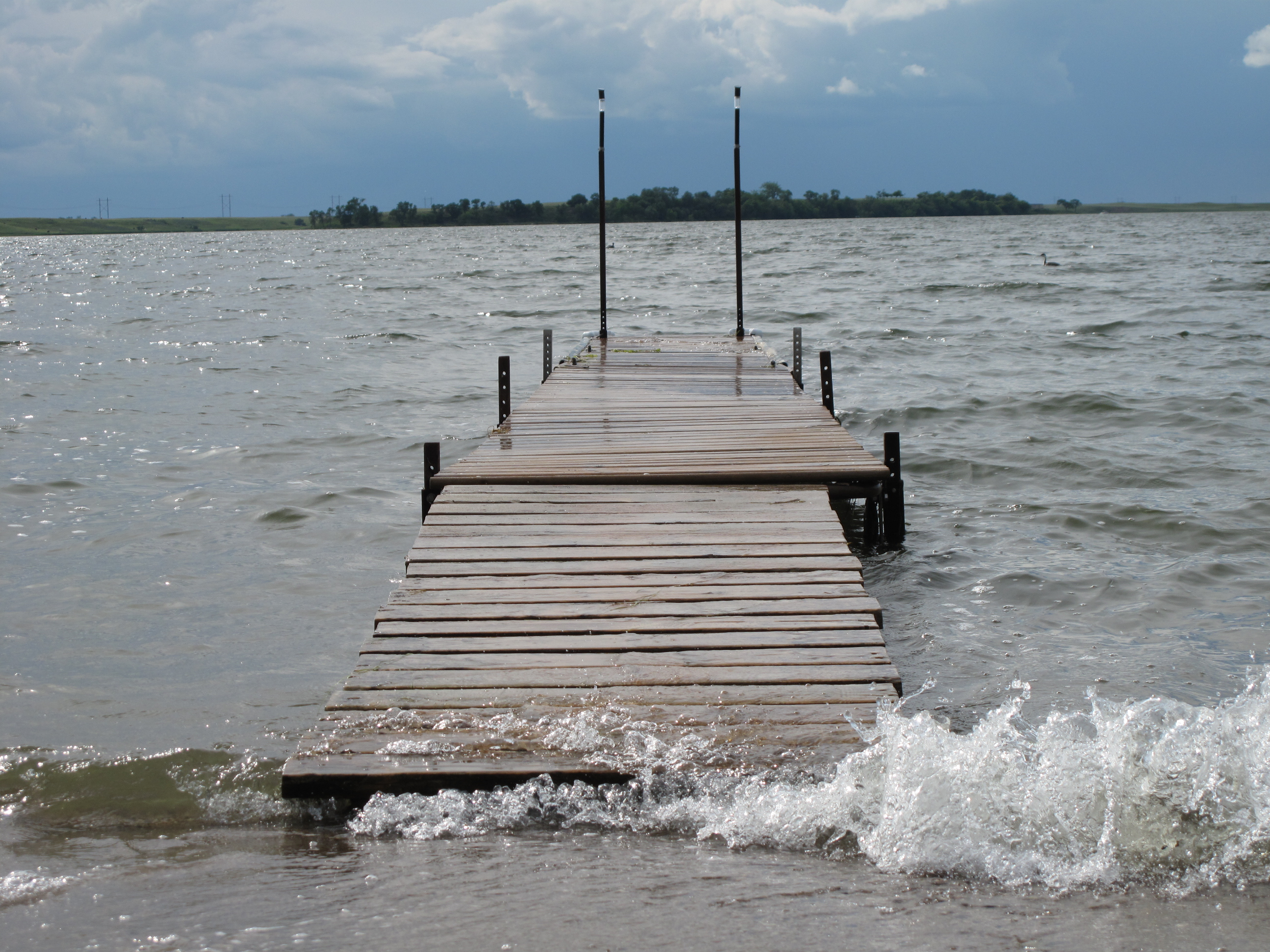

Mohr's Beach is a hamlet in the Canadian province of Saskatchewan. It is on the eastern shore of Last Mountain Lake in the Rural Municipality of McKillop No. 220. Access is from Highway 322.

== Demographics ==
In the 2021 Census of Population conducted by Statistics Canada, Mohr's Beach had a population of 15 living in 8 of its 18 total private dwellings, a change of inf% from its 2016 population of . With a land area of 0.3 km^{2} (0.12 sq mi), it had a population density of 50.0/km^{2} (129.5/sq mi) in 2021.

== See also ==
- List of communities in Saskatchewan
