= Gibbs, Saskatchewan =

Community in Saskatchewan, Canada

Coordinates: 50.902°N 104.862°W

Gibbs is an unincorporated community in the Rural Municipality of Longlaketon No. 219, Saskatchewan, Canada. The community is located on Highway 20 about 25 kilometres (16 mi) north of the town of Craven.

Gibbs was home to three permanent residents at the beginning of 2018.

== See also ==
- List of communities in Saskatchewan
- List of ghost towns in Saskatchewan
