= 1976 Canadian census =

Detailed enumeration of Canadian residents in 1976

← 1971	June 1, 1976	1981 →

General information
- Country: Canada
- Authority: Statistics Canada

Results
- Total population: 22,992,604 (▲6.6%)
- Most populous province/territory: Ontario (8,264,465)
- Least populous province/territory: Yukon (21,836)

The 1976 Canadian census was a detailed enumeration of the Canadian population. Census day was June 1, 1976. On that day, Statistics Canada attempted to count every person in Canada. The total population count of Canada was 22,992,604. This was a 6.6% increase over the 1971 census of 21,568,311.

The previous census was the 1971 census and the following census was in 1981 census.

== Canada by the numbers ==
A summary of information about Canada.

Total population	22,992,604
Dwellings	7,166,095
Men	11,449,525
Women	11,543,075

== Population by province ==
Rank	Province or territory	Population as of 1976 census	Population as of 1971 census	Change	Percent change
1	Ontario	8,264,465	7,703,106	561,359 ▲	7.3 ▲
2	Quebec	6,234,445	6,027,764	206,681 ▲	3.4 ▲
3	British Columbia	2,466,608	2,184,621	281,987 ▲	12.9 ▲
4	Alberta	1,838,037	1,627,874	210,163 ▲	12.9 ▲
5	Manitoba	1,021,506	988,247	33,259 ▲	3.4 ▲
6	Saskatchewan	921,323	926,242	−4,919 ▼	−0.5 ▼
7	Nova Scotia	828,571	788,960	39,611 ▲	5.0 ▲
8	New Brunswick	677,250	634,557	42,693 ▲	6.7 ▲
9	Newfoundland and Labrador	557,725	522,104	35,621 ▲	6.8 ▲
10	Prince Edward Island	118,229	111,641	6,588 ▲	5.9 ▲
11	Northwest Territories	42,609	34,807	7,802 ▲	22.4 ▲
12	Yukon	21,836	18,388	3,448 ▲	18.8 ▲
	Canada	22,992,604	21,568,311	1,424,293 ▲	6.6 ▲

== See also ==
- Population and housing censuses by country
