= Island View, Saskatchewan =

Resort village in Saskatchewan, Canada

Island View
- Resort village
- Resort Village of Island View
- Location within Saskatchewan Location within Canada
- Coordinates: 50.977°N 105.164°W
- Country: Canada
- Province: Saskatchewan
- Census division: 6
- Rural municipality: McKillop No. 220
- Incorporated: January 1, 1994

Government
  - Mayor: Doug Cramer
  - Governing body: Resort Village Council
  - Chief Administrative Officer (CAO): Pamela Holliday

Area
  - Land: 0.45 km^{2} (0.17 sq mi)

Population (2021)
  - Total: 134
  - Density: 297.8/km^{2} (771/sq mi)
- Time zone: CST
  - Summer (DST): CST
- Area codes: 306 and 639
- Waterway(s): Last Mountain Lake
- Website: Official website

Island View (2016 population: 74) is a resort village in the Canadian province of Saskatchewan within Census Division No. 6. It is on the shores of Last Mountain Lake in the Rural Municipality of McKillop No. 220.

== History ==
Island View incorporated as a resort village on January 1, 1994.

== Demographics ==
Population history (1996–2021)
Year	Pop.	±%
1996	33	—
2001	35	+6.1%
2006	88	+151.4%
2011	65	−26.1%
2016	74	+13.8%
2021	134	+81.1%
Source: Statistics Canada via Saskatchewan Bureau of Statistics

In the 2021 Census of Population conducted by Statistics Canada, Island View had a population of 134 living in 71 of its 251 total private dwellings, a change of 81.1% from its 2016 population of 74. With a land area of 0.45 km^{2} (0.17 sq mi), it had a population density of 297.8/km^{2} (771.2/sq mi) in 2021.

In the 2016 Census of Population conducted by Statistics Canada, the Resort Village of Island View recorded a population of 74 living in 39 of its 237 total private dwellings, a 13.8% change from its 2011 population of 65. With a land area of 0.43 km^{2} (0.17 sq mi), it had a population density of 172.1/km^{2} (445.7/sq mi) in 2016.

== Government ==
The Resort Village of Island View is governed by an elected municipal council and an appointed administrator that meets on the fourth Saturday of every month. The mayor is Doug Cramer and its Chief Administrative Officer (CAO) is Pamela Holliday.

== See also ==
- List of communities in Saskatchewan
- List of resort villages in Saskatchewan
- List of villages in Saskatchewan
- List of summer villages in Alberta
