= Bulyea =

Village in Saskatchewan, Canada

- Village
- Village of Bulyea
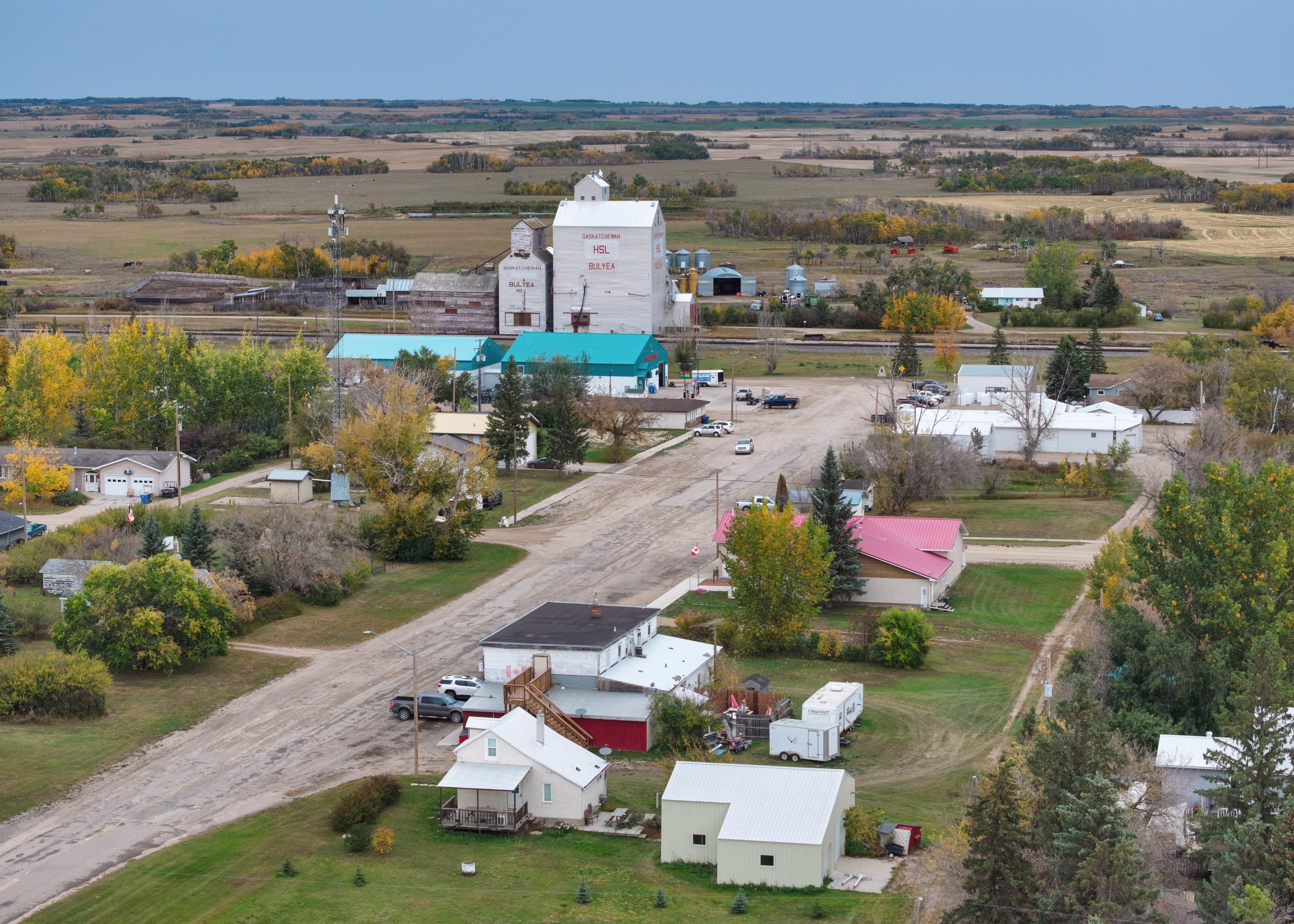

- Location of Bulyea in Saskatchewan Bulyea (Canada)
- Coordinates: 50.986°N 104.862°W
- Country: Canada
- Province: Saskatchewan
- Region: Southeast
- Census division: 6
- Rural Municipality: McKillop No. 220
- Settled: 1882
- Incorporated (Village): 1909

Government
  - Type: Municipal
  - Governing body: Bulyea Village Council
  - Mayor: Darren Cameron
  - Administrator: Sherry Beatty-Henfrey

Area
  - Total: 1.28 km^{2} (0.49 sq mi)

Population (2016)
  - Total: 113
  - Density: 88.4/km^{2} (229/sq mi)
- Time zone: UTC-6 (CST)
- Postal code: S0G 0L0
- Area code: 306
- Highways: Highway 20; Highway 220
- Railways: Canadian Pacific Railway

Bulyea (pronounced /ˈbʊljeɪ/ BUUL-yay ) (2016 population: 113) is a village in the Canadian province of Saskatchewan within the Rural Municipality of McKillop No. 220 and Census Division No. 6.

== History ==
Bulyea was first settled in 1882-1883 by immigrants from the United Kingdom and Ireland, and later people of Norwegian and German origins. Bulyea incorporated as a village on March 9, 1909. It was named after George H. V. Bulyea, a former member of the North-West Legislative Assembly and later the first Lieutenant Governor of Alberta.

== Demographics ==
Population history (1981–2016)
Year	Pop.	±%
1981	124	—
1986	143	+15.3%
1991	122	−14.7%
1996	99	−18.9%
2001	107	+8.1%
2006	104	−2.8%
2011	102	−1.9%
2016	113	+10.8%
Source: Statistics Canada via Saskatchewan Bureau of Statistics

In the 2021 Census of Population conducted by Statistics Canada, Bulyea had a population of 121 living in 55 of its 64 total private dwellings, a change of 7.1% from its 2016 population of 113. With a land area of 1.26 km^{2} (0.49 sq mi), it had a population density of 96.0/km^{2} (248.7/sq mi) in 2021.

In the 2016 Census of Population, the Village of Bulyea recorded a population of 113 living in 52 of its 54 total private dwellings, a 9.7% change from its 2011 population of 102. With a land area of 1.28 km^{2} (0.49 sq mi), it had a population density of 88.3/km^{2} (228.6/sq mi) in 2016.

== Sports ==
A Bulyea senior men's ice hockey team was one of five founding members in 1965 of the Highway Hockey League in central Saskatchewan.

== See also ==
- List of communities in Saskatchewan
- List of villages in Saskatchewan
