= North Colesdale Park =

Hamlet in Saskatchewan, Canada

Coordinates: 50°57′34″N 105°09′21″W

North Colesdale Park is a hamlet in the Canadian province of Saskatchewan. It is adjacent to Colesdale Park on the eastern shore of Last Mountain Lake in the Rural Municipality of McKillop No. 220.

== Demographics ==
In the 2021 Census of Population conducted by Statistics Canada, North Colesdale Park had a population of 22 living in 12 of its 28 total private dwellings, a change of -26.7% from its 2016 population of 30. With a land area of 0.11 km^{2} (0.042 sq mi), it had a population density of 200.0/km^{2} (518.0/sq mi) in 2021.

== See also ==
- List of communities in Saskatchewan
