= Uhl's Bay =

Hamlet in Saskatchewan, Canada

Coordinates: 50°58′59″N 105°08′41″W

Uhl's Bay is a hamlet in the Canadian province of Saskatchewan. The hamlet is just east of Rowan's Ravine Provincial Park and Last Mountain Lake at the junction of Highways 220 and 731.

== Demographics ==
In the 2021 Census of Population conducted by Statistics Canada, Uhl's Bay had a population of 20 living in 13 of its 19 total private dwellings, a change of 300% from its 2016 population of 5. With a land area of 1.15 km^{2} (0.44 sq mi), it had a population density of 17.4/km^{2} (45.0/sq mi) in 2021.

== See also ==
- List of communities in Saskatchewan
