= Division No. 6, Saskatchewan =

Census division in Canada

Coordinates: 50°26′N 104°37′W

Division No. 6
- Census division in Saskatchewan
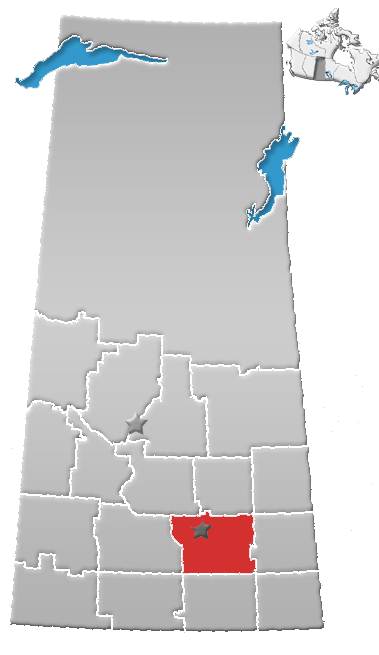
- Country: Canada
- Province: Saskatchewan

Area
  - Total: 17,548.18 km^{2} (6,775.39 sq mi)
- As of 2016

Population (2016)
  - Total: 262,837
  - Density: 14.9780/km^{2} (38.7929/sq mi)

Division No. 6 is one of eighteen census divisions in the province of Saskatchewan, Canada, as defined by Statistics Canada. It is located in the south-central part of the province. The most populous community in this division is Regina, the provincial capital.

== Demographics ==
In the 2021 Census of Population conducted by Statistics Canada, Division No. 6 had a population of 276,564 living in 111,468 of its 122,908 total private dwellings, a change of 5.2% from its 2016 population of 262,837. With a land area of 17,363.04 km^{2} (6,703.91 sq mi), it had a population density of 15.9/km^{2} (41.3/sq mi) in 2021.

Knowledge of languages in Division No. 6 (1991−2021)
Language	2021		2011		2001		1991	
Language	Pop.	%	Pop.	%	Pop.	%	Pop.	%
English	268,710	98.86%	233,365	99.31%	215,485	99.69%	215,085	99.5%
French	15,120	5.56%	12,425	5.29%	12,035	5.57%	11,540	5.34%
Hindustani (Note: Combined responses of Hindi and Urdu as they form mutually intelligible registers of the Hindustani language.)	11,730	4.32%	2,900	1.23%	645	0.3%	515	0.24%
Tagalog	10,050	3.7%	3,865	1.64%	750	0.35%	460	0.21%
Punjabi	6,085	2.24%	1,575	0.67%	500	0.23%	275	0.13%
Chinese (Note: Combined responses of the Chinese languages, including Mandarin, Cantonese, Min Nan, Hakka, Wu (Shanghainese), Min Dong, Chinese, n.o.s., and Chinese languages, n.i.e..)	5,470	2.01%	3,385	1.44%	2,325	1.08%	2,475	1.14%
Spanish	2,895	1.07%	2,500	1.06%	1,855	0.86%	1,390	0.64%
Arabic	2,690	0.99%	845	0.36%	505	0.23%	200	0.09%
German (Note: Combined responses of the High German languages, including Standard German, Pennsylvania German, Swiss German, and Yiddish.)	2,125	0.78%	3,995	1.7%	6,600	3.05%	10,080	4.66%
Vietnamese	2,065	0.76%	1,015	0.43%	955	0.44%	855	0.4%
Ukrainian	1,845	0.68%	1,845	0.79%	2,835	1.31%	4,185	1.94%
Russian	1,700	0.63%	1,140	0.49%	410	0.19%	405	0.19%
Cree (Note: Combined responses of the Cree-Innu languages, previously categorized under "Cree" in past censuses.)	1,020	0.38%	670	0.29%	1,195	0.55%	975	0.45%
Greek	810	0.3%	675	0.29%	705	0.33%	435	0.2%
Italian	615	0.23%	620	0.26%	785	0.36%	795	0.37%
Polish	430	0.16%	620	0.26%	1,030	0.48%	1,280	0.59%
Persian (Note: Combined responses of Iranian Persian, Dari, and Persian (Farsi), n.o.s., as they form mutually intelligible registers of the Persian language)	420	0.15%	220	0.09%	180	0.08%	230	0.11%
Portuguese	350	0.13%	135	0.06%	70	0.03%	115	0.05%
Hungarian	325	0.12%	550	0.23%	975	0.45%	1,340	0.62%
Dutch	325	0.12%	315	0.13%	485	0.22%	680	0.31%
Total responses	271,810	98.28%	234,990	98.84%	216,160	98.59%	216,165	98.88%
Total population	276,564	100%	237,746	100%	219,250	100%	218,612	100%

== Census subdivisions ==
The following census subdivisions (municipalities or municipal equivalents) are located within Saskatchewan's Division No. 6.

=== Cities ===
- Regina

=== Towns ===
- Balcarres
- Balgonie
- Cupar
- Fort Qu'Appelle
- Francis
- Grand Coulee
- Indian Head
- Lumsden
- Pilot Butte
- Qu'Appelle
- Regina Beach
- Rouleau
- Sintaluta
- Southey
- Strasbourg
- White City

=== Villages ===
- Abernethy
- Belle Plaine
- Bethune
- Briercrest
- Buena Vista
- Bulyea
- Chamberlain
- Craven
- Dilke
- Disley
- Drinkwater
- Dysart
- Earl Grey
- Edenwold
- Findlater
- Holdfast
- Kendal
- Lebret
- Lipton
- Markinch
- McLean
- Montmartre
- Odessa
- Pense
- Sedley
- Silton
- Vibank
- Wilcox

=== Resort villages ===
- Alice Beach
- B-Say-Tah
- Fort San
- Glen Harbour
- Grandview Beach
- Island View
- Kannata Valley
- Katepwa
- Lumsden Beach
- North Grove
- Pelican Pointe
- Saskatchewan Beach
- Sunset Cove
- Wee Too Beach

=== Rural municipalities ===
- RM No. 126 Montmartre
- RM No. 127 Francis
- RM No. 128 Lajord
- RM No. 129 Bratt's Lake
- RM No. 130 Redburn
- RM No. 156 Indian Head
- RM No. 157 South Qu'Appelle
- RM No. 158 Edenwold
- RM No. 159 Sherwood
- RM No. 160 Pense
- RM No. 186 Abernethy
- RM No. 187 North Qu'Appelle
- RM No. 189 Lumsden
- RM No. 190 Dufferin
- RM No. 216 Tullymet
- RM No. 217 Lipton
- RM No. 218 Cupar
- RM No. 219 Longlaketon
- RM No. 220 McKillop
- RM No. 221 Sarnia

=== Indian reserves ===
- Treaty Four Reserve Grounds 77 (shared by 33 First Nations)
- Carry the Kettle Nakoda First Nation
  - Assiniboine 76
- Little Black Bear First Nation
  - Little Black Bear 84
- Muscowpetung First Nation
  - Muscowpetung 80
- Okanese First Nation
  - Okanese 82
- Pasqua First Nation
  - Pasqua 79
- Peepeekisis Cree Nation
  - Peepeekisis 81
- Piapot Cree Nation
  - Piapot 75
- Standing Buffalo Dakota Nation
  - Standing Buffalo 78
- Star Blanket Cree Nation
  - Atim Ka-mihkosit Reserve
  - Star Blanket 83
  - Star Blanket 83C
  - Wa-pii-moos-toosis 83A

== See also ==
- List of census divisions of Saskatchewan
- List of communities in Saskatchewan
