= Colesdale Park =

Hamlet in Saskatchewan, Canada

Coordinates: 50°57′08″N 105°09′09″W

Colesdale Park is a hamlet in the Canadian province of Saskatchewan. It is adjacent to North Colesdale Park on the eastern shore of Last Mountain Lake in the Rural Municipality of McKillop No. 220.

== Demographics ==
In the 2021 Census of Population conducted by Statistics Canada, Colesdale Park had a population of 25 living in 14 of its 55 total private dwellings, a change of 25% from its 2016 population of 20. With a land area of 0.09 km^{2} (0.035 sq mi), it had a population density of 277.8/km^{2} (719.4/sq mi) in 2021.

== See also ==
- List of communities in Saskatchewan
