= Silton, Saskatchewan =

Village in Saskatchewan, Canada

Coordinates: 50°48′16″N 104°54′46″W

Location of Silton in Saskatchewan

Silton (2016 population: 71) is a village in the Canadian province of Saskatchewan within the Rural Municipality of Longlaketon No. 219 and Census Division No. 6. Access is from Highway 322.

== History ==
Silton incorporated as a village on July 2, 1914.

== Demographics ==
Population history (1981–2016)
Year	Pop.	±%
1981	59	—
1986	104	+76.3%
1991	77	−26.0%
1996	86	+11.7%
2001	94	+9.3%
2006	91	−3.2%
2011	95	+4.4%
2016	71	−25.3%
Source: Statistics Canada via Saskatchewan Bureau of Statistics

In the 2021 Census of Population conducted by Statistics Canada, Silton had a population of 95 living in 45 of its 53 total private dwellings, a change of 33.8% from its 2016 population of 71. With a land area of 1.06 km^{2} (0.41 sq mi), it had a population density of 89.6/km^{2} (232.1/sq mi) in 2021.

In the 2016 Census of Population, the Village of Silton recorded a population of 71 living in 37 of its 48 total private dwellings, a -33.8% change from its 2011 population of 95. With a land area of 1.07 km^{2} (0.41 sq mi), it had a population density of 66.4/km^{2} (171.9/sq mi) in 2016.

== See also ==
- List of villages in Saskatchewan
