= Spring Bay, Saskatchewan =

Organized hamlet in Saskatchewan, Canada

Coordinates: 50°56′21″N 105°08′25″W

Spring Bay is a hamlet in the Canadian province of Saskatchewan. It is on the eastern shore of Last Mountain Lake.

== Demographics ==
In the 2021 Census of Population conducted by Statistics Canada, Spring Bay had a population of 20 living in 13 of its 39 total private dwellings, a change of 100% from its 2016 population of 10. With a land area of 0.22 km^{2} (0.085 sq mi), it had a population density of 90.9/km^{2} (235.5/sq mi) in 2021.

== Government ==
Past hamlet board members included:

- Chair — Karen Kramer (term expired in 2021)
- Secretary — David Price (term expired in 2019)
- Member — Devin Krohn (term expired in 2020)

== See also ==
- List of communities in Saskatchewan
