= 1981 Canadian census =

Detailed enumeration of Canadian residents in 1981

- June 3, 1981

General information
- Country: Canada

Results
- Total population: 24,343,181 (▲5.9%)
- Most populous province/territory: Ontario (8,625,107)
- Least populous province/territory: Yukon (23,153)

The 1981 Canadian census was a detailed enumeration of the Canadian population. Census day was June 3, 1981. On that day, Statistics Canada attempted to count every person in Canada. The total population count of Canada was 24,343,181. This was a 5.9% increase over the 1976 census of 22,992,604.

The previous census was the 1976 census and the following census was in 1991 census.

== Canada by the numbers ==
A summary of information about Canada.

Total population	24,343,181
Dwellings	8,281,530
Men	12,068,290
Women	12,274,890

== Population by province ==
Rank	Province or territory	Population as of 1981 census	Population as of 1976 census	Change	Percent change
1	Ontario	8,625,107	8,264,465	360,642 ▲	4.4 ▲
2	Quebec	6,438,403	6,234,445	203,958 ▲	3.3 ▲
3	British Columbia	2,744,467	2,466,608	277,859 ▲	11.3 ▲
4	Alberta	2,237,724	1,838,037	399,687 ▲	21.7 ▲
5	Manitoba	1,026,241	1,021,506	4,735 ▲	0.5 ▲
6	Saskatchewan	968,313	921,323	46,990 ▲	5.1 ▲
7	Nova Scotia	847,442	828,571	18,871 ▲	2.3 ▲
8	New Brunswick	696,403	677,250	19,153 ▲	2.8 ▲
9	Newfoundland and Labrador	567,681	557,725	9,956 ▲	1.8 ▲
10	Prince Edward Island	122,506	118,229	4,277 ▲	3.6 ▲
11	Northwest Territories	45,741	42,609	3,132 ▲	7.4 ▲
12	Yukon	23,153	21,836	1,317 ▲	6.0 ▲
	Canada	24,343,181	22,992,604	1,350,577 ▲	5.9 ▲

== Largest municipalities ==
Rank	Municipality	Province	Population
1	Montreal	Quebec	980,354
2	Toronto	Ontario	599,217
3	Calgary	Alberta	592,743
4	Winnipeg	Manitoba	564,473
5	North York	Ontario	559,521
6	Edmonton	Alberta	532,246
7	Scarborough	Ontario	443,353
8	Vancouver	British Columbia	414,281
9	Mississauga	Ontario	315,056
10	Hamilton	Ontario	306,434
11	Etobicoke	Ontario	298,713
12	Ottawa	Ontario	295,163
13	Laval	Quebec	268,335
14	London	Ontario	254,280
15	Windsor	Ontario	192,083
16	Quebec	Quebec	166,474
17	Regina	Saskatchewan	162,613
18	Saskatoon	Saskatchewan	152,210
19	Brampton	Ontario	149,030
20	Surrey	British Columbia	147,138
21	Kitchener	Ontario	139,734
22	Burnaby	British Columbia	136,494
23	York	Ontario	134,617
24	Longueuil	Quebec	124,320
25	St. Catharines	Ontario	124,018

== See also ==
- Population and housing censuses by country
