= Last Mountain Lake =

Lake in Saskatchewan, Canada

- Long Lake
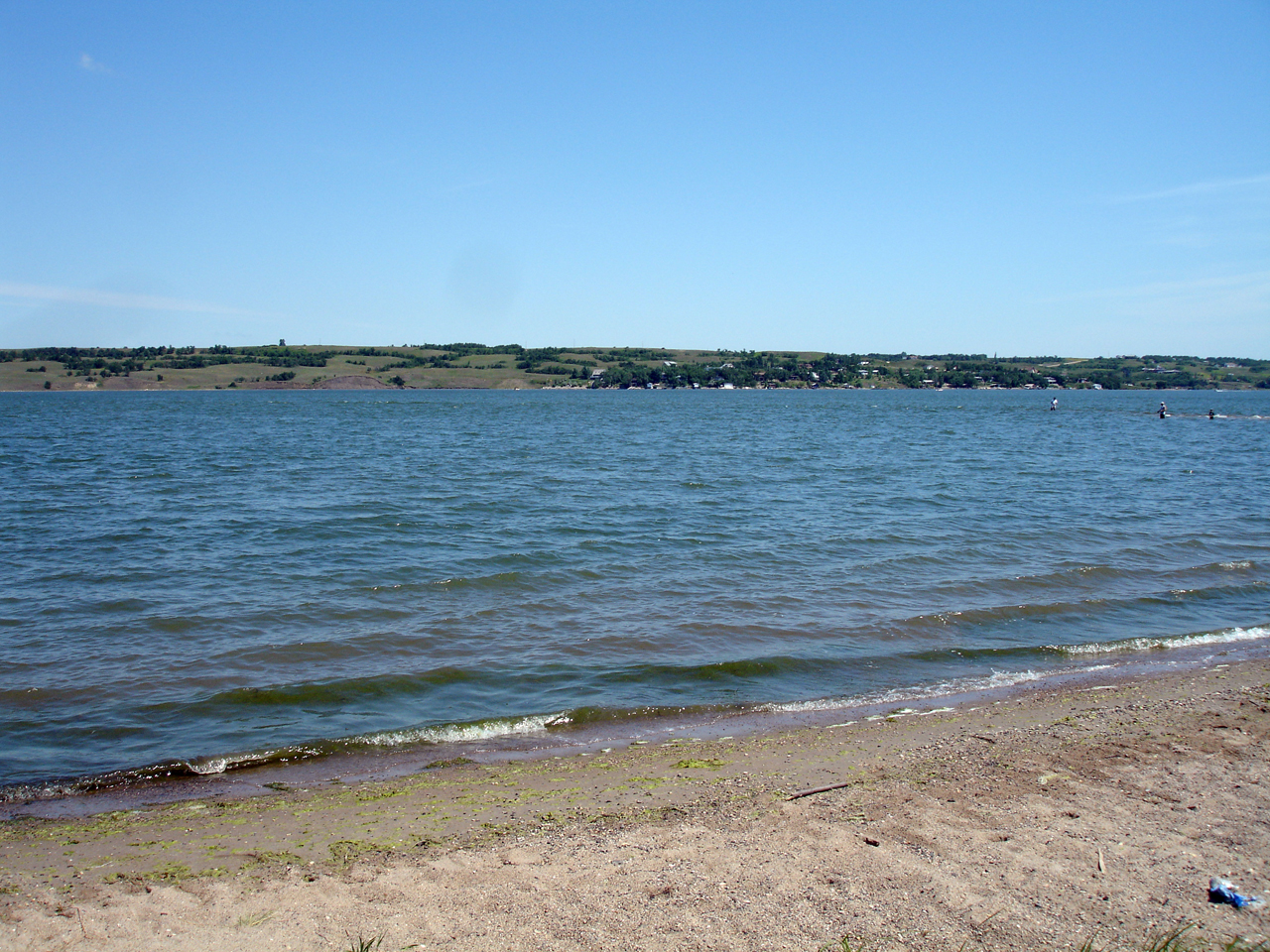
- Last Mountain Lake

- Location in Saskatchewan Last Mountain Lake (Canada)
- Location: Saskatchewan
- Coordinates: 51°10′N 105°15′W
- Lake type: Prairie lake
- Part of: Red River drainage basin
- Primary inflows: Lanigan Creek; Lewis Creek; Arm River
- Primary outflows: Last Mountain Creek
- Basin countries: Canada
- Max. length: 93 km (58 mi)
- Max. width: 3 km (1.9 mi)
- Surface area: 21,615 ha (53,410 acres)
- Average depth: 35 m (115 ft)
- Max. depth: 40 m (130 ft)
- Surface elevation: 490 m (1,610 ft)
- Islands: Bird Island; Royal Island
- Settlements: Regina Beach, Saskatchewan Beach; Wee Too Beach; Buena Vista

Ramsar Wetland
- Designated: 24 May 1982
- Reference no.: 239

Last Mountain Lake, also known as Long Lake, is a prairie lake formed from glaciation about 11,000 years ago. The lake is located in south-central Saskatchewan, Canada, about 40 kilometres (25 mi) north-west of the city of Regina. It is a large lake, approximately 93 kilometres (58 mi) long and 3 kilometres (1.9 mi) wide, in the Qu'Appelle River drainage basin. The lake is a popular resort area for residents of south-eastern Saskatchewan.

Last Mountain Lake is named after a Plains Cree legend about the Great Spirit shovelling dirt from the valley that the lake now occupies to form the Last Mountain Hills. The hills lie east of the lake and east of the communities of Duval and Strasbourg.

== History ==
In the late 1800s, access to the area for farming and settlement was opened up by the Qu'Appelle, Long Lake and Saskatchewan Railroad and Steamboat Company which also operated steamships on the lake.

=== Last Mountain House ===
Last Mountain House was a Hudson's Bay Company (HBC) trading post on Last Mountain Lake from 1869 to 1871. It was a branch of Fort Qu'Appelle 75 kilometres (47 mi) east and was about 85 kilometres (53 mi) south-west of Touchwood Hills Post. It was founded in part to compete with the increasing number of independent traders in the area and because the buffalo had moved south from Touchwood Hills. Some time after the second season the post was completely destroyed by fire and was not rebuilt. The House was located on the east side of Last Mountain Lake, about 1.6 kilometres (1 mi) north of the lake's outlet, 7 kilometres (4.3 mi) north-west of Craven, and about 40 kilometres (25 mi) north-west of Regina. The area is now part of Last Mountain House Provincial Park and on the Canadian Register of Historic Places.

== Geographical features ==
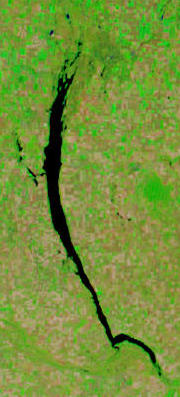
NASA satellite image of Last Mountain Lake

Several creeks and rivers flow into the lake, including Arm River, Lewis Creek, and Lanigan Creek. Last Mountain Creek flows out of the lake at the southern most point and into the Qu'Appelle River. During years in which the Qu'Appelle River's level is high, the Last Mountain Creek can reverse direction and flow back into Last Mountain Lake. The gates at Craven Dam on the Qu'Appelle River can be opened or closed to control the water level, and closing those gates can also cause water to flow back up the creek into the lake.

Named islands at the northern end of the lake include Royal Island, Bird Island, and Coney Island.

Near the southern end of the lake on the west side is Little Arm Bay, the outlet of the Arm River. Directly across from the bay is Pelican Point. The community of Pelican Pointe is located there.

=== Last Mountain Lake Sub-basin ===
The Qu'Appelle River watershed has two main basins, one called the Wascana & Upper Qu'Appelle Watersheds, the other the Lower Qu'Appelle Watershed. Craven Dam at the village of Craven is the dividing point between the upper and lower watersheds of the Qu'Appelle River. The upper watershed, which has a total area of 23,443 km^{2} (9,051 sq mi), has four sub-basins: Last Mountain Lake Sub-basin, Lanigan-Manitou Sub-basin, Wascana Creek Sub-basin, and Upper Qu’Appelle Sub-basin; it also includes the Moose Jaw River Watershed. Last Mountain Lake Sub-basin includes all the land that drains into the lake from the east and west, including Arm River and Lewis Creek. Lanigan Creek at the north end of the lake is part of the Lanigan-Manitou Sub-basin, and Last Mountain Creek at the south end is part of the Upper Qu’Appelle Sub-basin.

== Communities ==
Glen Harbour, Last Mountain Lake pre-1910

Eight different rural municipalities (RM) border at least part of the lake. Clock-wise from the north, RMs include Wreford No. 280, Last Mountain Valley No. 250, McKillop No. 220, Longlaketon No. 219, Lumsden No. 189, Dufferin No. 190, Sarnia No. 21, and Big Arm No. 251.

Communities that line Last Mountain Lake include Kannata Valley, Arlington Beach, Grandview Beach, MacPheat Park, Regina Beach, Saskatchewan Beach, Buena Vista, Glen Harbour, Alice Beach, Wee Too Beach, Lipp's Beach, Alta Vista, Colesdale Park, Spring Bay, Kedleston Beach, Pelican Pointe, Sunset Cove, Island View, Sorensen Beach, Etters Beach, Mohr's Beach, North Colesdale Park, Hendersons Beach, and Sarnia Beach.

Beside Regina Beach, around Little Arm Bay, is Kinookimaw and Last Mountain Lake 80A Indian reserve.

== Parks and recreation ==
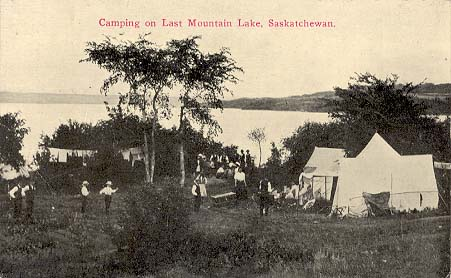
Camping on Last Mountain Lake pre-1910

About 25 kilometres (16 mi) south-west of the town of Strasbourg, along the lake's eastern shore, lies Rowan's Ravine Provincial Park. This park includes a marina, a full-service campground, restaurant, mini-golf, beach, and an outfitters. The beach is along a point and is one of Saskatchewan's longest, natural sand beaches. The marina there is often used by recreational boaters travelling from Regina Beach as a stop-over or refuelling point and large fishing tournament called Last Mountain Fall Walleye Classic is held there every September. Last Mountain House Provincial Park is located on the south-east shore and provides tours of historical the Last Mountain House, which was built by the Hudson's Bay Company in 1869.

At the northern end of the lake, on the eastern shore is Last Mountain Regional Park. The park offers camping, swimming, and golf. It is located about 15 kilometres (9.3 mi) west of Govan, off Highway 20.

At the southern end of the lake, where Last Mountain Creek starts, is the Valeport Recreation Site and Valeport Marsh. The area is protected by a 900-acre conservation project called Valeport Wildlife Management Area Trails. It is in conjunction with Ducks Unlimited and part of the Valeport Marsh (SK 061) Important Bird Area (IBA) of Canada. Along the west side of the Management Area is a Nature Conservancy of Canada property called Big Valley. Big Valley is protected and managed for bird and wildlife habitat.

The United Church of Canada's Lumsden Beach Camp is "[a] short drive from Regina, ... hugging the south shore of Last Mountain Lake." Founded in 1905, it is the oldest summer camp in Western Canada.

=== Last Mountain Lake Bird Sanctuary ===
The Last Mountain Lake Bird Sanctuary, the first federal bird sanctuary in North America, was established here in 1887. As the first such wildlife reserve of this kind on the continent, it was designated a National Historic Site of Canada in 1987. Over 280 bird species have been recorded. The lake contains appropriate habitat for nine of Canada's 36 species of vulnerable, threatened and endangered birds, such as the peregrine falcon, piping plover, burrowing owl, and whooping crane.

The northern end of the lake is very shallow and contains wetlands. Part of this area of the lake and surrounding area has been set aside as the Last Mountain Lake National Wildlife Area, which is a site of regional importance in the Western Hemisphere Shorebird Reserve Network.

== Fish species ==
Fish species commonly found in Last Mountain Lake include walleye, yellow perch, northern pike, burbot, lake whitefish, cisco, bigmouth buffalo, white sucker, and common carp.

== See also ==
- List of lakes of Saskatchewan
- List of protected areas of Saskatchewan
- Tourism in Saskatchewan
- List of historic places in Saskatchewan
- Ramsar site
