= Strasbourg, Saskatchewan =

Town in Saskatchewan, Canada

Strasbourg
- Town
- Location of Strasbourg in Saskatchewan Strasbourg (Canada)
- Coordinates: 51.0703°N 104.9555°W
- Country: Canada
- Province: Saskatchewan
- Rural municipality: McKillop No. 220
- Post office Founded: 1905-10-16

Government
  - Type: Mayor & council
  - Mayor: Kelvin Schapansky
  - Administrator: Jennifer Josephson

Area
  - Total: 5.70 km^{2} (2.20 sq mi)

Population (2011)
  - Total: 752
  - Density: 132/km^{2} (340/sq mi)
- Time zone: UTC-6 (Central)
- Postal code: S0G 4V0
- Area code: 306
- Website: Official website

Strasbourg (/ˈstrɑːsbɜːrɡ/) is a town in the Canadian province of Saskatchewan. It is about 75 kilometres (47 mi) northwest of the provincial capital, Regina.

== History ==
The earliest settlers came to this area around 1884 as the area became known for its rich agricultural soil and ample land for pastures. The area was settled by German pioneers. The town was originally spelled Strassburg, Strass meaning road or street in German and burg meaning castle. The name was changed by Canada's Geography department to the French spelling of Strasbourg in 1919, following the renaming of the latter located in Alsace, France (Germany lost control of the city after World War I). The town was incorporated in 1907.

== Parks and recreation ==
The Strasbourg Recreation Centre, which was built in 1976, has an ice rink and a curling rink. It is home to the Strasbourg Maroons of the senior men's Highway Hockey League. Strasbourg also has a 9-hole golf course and ball diamonds.

The old Strasbourg CPR railway station was converted into a museum.

Twenty-five kilometres to the south-west of town on Last Mountain Lake is Rowan's Ravine Provincial Park and to the north-east is Last Mountain.

== Demographics ==
In the 2021 Census of Population conducted by Statistics Canada, Strasbourg had a population of 788 living in 362 of its 395 total private dwellings, a change of −1.5% from its 2016 population of 800. With a land area of 5.81 km^{2} (2.24 sq mi), it had a population density of 135.6/km^{2} (351.3/sq mi) in 2021.

Canada census – Strasbourg, Saskatchewan community profile

	2011
Population	752 (+2.7% from 2006)
Land area	5.70 km^{2} (2.20 sq mi)
Population density	132.0/km^{2} (342/sq mi)
Median age	53.6 (M: 51.2, F: 56.3)
Private dwellings	380 (total)
Median household income

References: 2011

== Notable people ==
- Frederick Bieber - Harvard Medical School professor
- Greg Hubick - Played in the NHL for the Toronto Maple Leafs and Vancouver Canucks
- Nick Schultz - Professional ice hockey player
- Bennet Wong - Psychiatrist

== See also ==
- List of towns in Saskatchewan
- List of communities in Saskatchewan
