= 1971 Canadian census =

Detailed enumeration of Canadian residents in 1971

- June 1, 1971

General information
- Country: Canada

Results
- Total population: 21,568,311 (7.8 ▲)
- Most populous province/territory: Ontario (7,703,106)
- Least populous province/territory: Yukon (18,388)

The 1971 Canadian census was a detailed enumeration of the Canadian population. Census day was June 1, 1971.

On that day, Statistics Canada attempted to count every person in Canada. The total population count was 21,568,311. This was a 7.8% increase over the 1966 Census of 20,014,880.

== Canada by the numbers ==
A summary of information about Canada.

Total population	21,568,311
Dwellings	6,034,508
Men	10,795,369
Women	10,772,942

== Census summary ==
This census was the first time Statistics Canada organized the event as the Dominion Bureau of Statistics changed its name on August 3, 1971, due to the Statistics Act on May 1, 1970. One of the reasons it did this is because the word Dominion cannot be well translated into French.

Canada experienced one of its biggest census growths with the population increasing by 7.8% from 20,014,880 in 1966 to 21,568,311.

The Northwest Territories and Yukon's populations soared rising above the national average with the Northwest Territories 17.4% and Yukon 21.7%. British Columbia and Alberta's populations also saw substantial growth, both going over the national average for British Columbia to grow 14.2% and Alberta 10.1%.

The census also revealed a rise in the number of immigrants living in the country. 1,347,155 or 6.2% of the population compared to 1,055,818 or 5.2% in 1966. Ontario was the most diverse province with 9.9% of inhabitants reporting citizenship other than Canadian. Newfoundland, as it was called before 2001, was the least diverse province with 99.1% of the population having Canadian citizenship. 60.1% of people claimed English as their mother tongue compared to 58.4% a decade earlier. Canadians who claimed French as their mother tongue, however, shrunk from 28% to 26.8%.

== Population by province ==
The population of each province in Canada:

Rank	Province or territory	Population as of 1971 census	Population as of 1966 census	Change	Percent change
1	Ontario	7,703,106	6,960,870	742,236 ▲	9.6 ▲
2	Quebec	6,027,764	5,780,845	246,919 ▲	4.0 ▲
3	British Columbia	2,184,621	1,873,674	310,947 ▲	14.2 ▲
4	Alberta	1,627,874	1,463,203	164,671 ▲	10.1 ▲
5	Manitoba	988,247	963,066	25,181 ▲	2.5 ▲
6	Saskatchewan	926,242	955,344	-29,102 ▼	-3.0 ▼
7	Nova Scotia	788,960	756,039	32,921 ▲	4.2 ▲
8	New Brunswick	634,557	616,788	17,769 ▲	2.8 ▲
9	Newfoundland	522,104	493,396	28,708 ▲	5.5 ▲
10	Prince Edward Island	111,641	108,535	3,106 ▲	2.8 ▲
11	Northwest Territories	34,807	28,738	6,069 ▲	17.4 ▲
12	Yukon	18,388	14,382	4,006 ▲	21.7 ▲
	Canada	21,568,311	20,014,880	1,553,431 ▲	7.2 ▲

== Mother tongue ==
Population by mother tongue:

Mother tongue	Population as of 1971 census	Population as of 1966 census	Change	Percent change
English	12,973,810	10,660,534	2,313,276	21,71 ▲
French	5,793,650	5,123,151	670,499	26,9 ▲
German	561,085	563,713	2,628	-0,47 ▼
Italian	538,360	339,626	198,734	58.52 ▲
Ukrainian	309,855	361,496	51,641	-14,29 ▼
Other	1,391,551	1,645,932	254,381	18.29 ▼

== Ethnic group ==
Major ethnic groups in Canada by province/territory (1971 census)
Ethnic group	Canada		ON		QC		BC		AB		MB		SK		NS		NB		NL		PE		NT		YT	
Ethnic group	Pop.	%	Pop.	%	Pop.	%	Pop.	%	Pop.	%	Pop.	%	Pop.	%	Pop.	%	Pop.	%	Pop.	%	Pop.	%	Pop.	%	Pop.	%
English (Note: Responses to all major ethnic groups from the British Isles were noted to have a large margin of error during the 1971 Canadian census due to increasing levels of inter-marriage during the post-war era. In the ensuing decades (1980s, 1990s, and beyond), a similar trend would also occur more broadly amongst all European ethnic groups in Canada. A direct quote from the report on this topic is shown below: "Ethnic group data are subject to considerable response variation. Particularly is this true for groups such as English, Irish, Scottish and Welsh, where inter-marriage among these groups has occurred in Canada at relatively high levels over the years. For this reason, census data in recent decades have been confined largely to showing only the British Isles group in total. However, one short statement for Canada and the provinces has been included in this section of the report to provide general information as to the numbers reported as English, Irish, Scottish, and Welsh, even though the data are regarded as considerably less meaningful than for the British Isles group as a whole. This situation is accentuated in the results of the 1971 Census. For example, it is apparent that significant numbers of persons reported in the Irish, Scottish and Welsh categories in 1961 must have been reported as English in 1971. Sufficient analysis has not been possible to determine the causes of this unexpected trend. But the fact that "English" was the first marking position for this question on the 1971 "self-enumeration" forms may have led some ethnic mixtures within the British Isles group to overstate this position. It may be partly due also to confusion by some respondents in mistaking "English" to mean the "English-speaking" culture. Whatever the causes, the English group appears sufficiently inflated at the expense of the remaining three component groups to distort comparability of trend data with 1961 and earlier years. In fact, each of the groups (English, Scottish and Welsh) are significantly lower than their 1961 values. These qualifications should be borne in mind when using the data in the following statement which shows the 1971 distributions for Canada and the provinces.")	6,245,970	28.96%	2,999,375	38.94%	389,790	6.47%	806,935	36.94%	457,235	28.09%	241,810	24.47%	235,315	25.4%	393,435	49.87%	240,765	37.94%	418,775	80.21%	52,390	46.92%	5,155	14.8%	4,995	27.15%
French	6,180,120	28.65%	737,360	9.57%	4,759,360	78.96%	96,550	4.42%	94,665	5.82%	86,510	8.75%	56,200	6.07%	80,215	10.17%	235,025	37.04%	15,410	2.95%	15,325	13.72%	2,275	6.53%	1,230	6.69%
Scottish	1,720,390	7.98%	774,080	10.05%	108,085	1.79%	263,910	12.08%	160,565	9.86%	97,980	9.91%	79,940	8.63%	139,740	17.71%	58,395	9.2%	9,590	1.84%	24,105	21.59%	1,985	5.7%	2,010	10.93%
Irish	1,581,730	7.33%	772,875	10.03%	139,100	2.31%	176,980	8.1%	133,045	8.17%	69,550	7.04%	70,730	7.64%	75,265	9.54%	64,865	10.22%	60,490	11.59%	15,535	13.91%	1,500	4.31%	1,795	9.76%
German–Austrian	1,359,320	6.3%	491,085	6.38%	56,370	0.94%	208,160	9.53%	237,315	14.58%	126,265	12.78%	183,940	19.86%	41,160	5.22%	8,560	1.35%	2,455	0.47%	960	0.86%	1,390	3.99%	1,665	9.05%
Italian	730,820	3.39%	463,095	6.01%	169,655	2.81%	53,795	2.46%	24,805	1.52%	10,445	1.06%	2,865	0.31%	3,770	0.48%	1,380	0.22%	495	0.09%	105	0.09%	250	0.72%	160	0.87%
Ukrainian	580,660	2.69%	159,880	2.08%	20,325	0.34%	60,145	2.75%	135,510	8.32%	114,410	11.58%	85,920	9.28%	2,315	0.29%	600	0.09%	175	0.03%	125	0.11%	635	1.82%	610	3.32%
Scandinavian–Nordic	443,990	2.06%	98,740	1.28%	10,685	0.18%	123,635	5.66%	102,015	6.27%	36,555	3.7%	60,835	6.57%	4,265	0.54%	3,750	0.59%	1,225	0.23%	270	0.24%	935	2.69%	1,085	5.9%
Dutch	425,945	1.97%	206,940	2.69%	12,590	0.21%	70,535	3.23%	58,565	3.6%	35,300	3.57%	19,040	2.06%	14,845	1.88%	5,365	0.85%	665	0.13%	1,245	1.11%	340	0.98%	515	2.8%
Polish	316,425	1.47%	144,115	1.87%	23,970	0.4%	29,545	1.35%	44,325	2.72%	42,700	4.32%	26,910	2.91%	3,260	0.41%	690	0.11%	285	0.05%	110	0.1%	270	0.78%	245	1.33%
Indigenous	312,765	1.45%	63,175	0.82%	36,590	0.61%	52,430	2.4%	44,680	2.74%	43,165	4.37%	40,550	4.38%	4,495	0.57%	3,920	0.62%	2,280	0.44%	315	0.28%	18,580	53.36%	2,590	14.08%
Jewish	296,945	1.38%	135,195	1.76%	115,990	1.92%	12,175	0.56%	7,320	0.45%	20,010	2.02%	2,195	0.24%	2,535	0.32%	1,030	0.16%	360	0.07%	60	0.05%	30	0.09%	35	0.19%
Hungarian	131,890	0.61%	65,695	0.85%	12,570	0.21%	16,600	0.76%	16,240	1%	5,405	0.55%	13,825	1.49%	755	0.1%	365	0.06%	105	0.02%	20	0.02%	115	0.33%	195	1.06%
Greek	124,475	0.58%	67,025	0.87%	42,870	0.71%	6,615	0.3%	3,250	0.2%	2,095	0.21%	900	0.1%	1,220	0.15%	335	0.05%	100	0.02%	0	0%	35	0.1%	25	0.14%
Chinese	118,815	0.55%	39,325	0.51%	11,905	0.2%	44,315	2.03%	12,905	0.79%	3,430	0.35%	4,605	0.5%	935	0.12%	575	0.09%	610	0.12%	25	0.02%	115	0.33%	85	0.46%
Yugoslav	104,950	0.49%	70,060	0.91%	6,810	0.11%	14,730	0.67%	7,410	0.46%	3,110	0.31%	2,090	0.23%	355	0.04%	95	0.01%	10	0%	30	0.03%	100	0.29%	150	0.82%
Portuguese	96,875	0.45%	63,145	0.82%	16,555	0.27%	9,635	0.44%	2,385	0.15%	3,815	0.39%	275	0.03%	475	0.06%	195	0.03%	340	0.07%	15	0.01%	20	0.06%	25	0.14%
Czechoslovak	81,870	0.38%	40,770	0.53%	6,725	0.11%	10,630	0.49%	12,970	0.8%	4,760	0.48%	4,940	0.53%	670	0.08%	165	0.03%	50	0.01%	25	0.02%	105	0.3%	75	0.41%
Welsh	74,415	0.35%	29,070	0.38%	2,820	0.05%	17,300	0.79%	10,625	0.65%	4,680	0.47%	4,130	0.45%	2,855	0.36%	1,700	0.27%	700	0.13%	255	0.23%	145	0.42%	140	0.76%
Indian (South Asian)	67,925	0.31%	30,920	0.4%	6,510	0.11%	18,795	0.86%	4,400	0.27%	3,205	0.32%	1,625	0.18%	1,345	0.17%	465	0.07%	460	0.09%	135	0.12%	55	0.16%	15	0.08%
Russian–Belarusian	66,755	0.31%	13,715	0.18%	4,255	0.07%	23,395	1.07%	10,490	0.64%	4,225	0.43%	10,080	1.09%	265	0.03%	150	0.02%	45	0.01%	10	0.01%	70	0.2%	70	0.38%
African/Black/West Indian	62,470	0.29%	37,760	0.49%	10,275	0.17%	2,435	0.11%	2,255	0.14%	2,125	0.22%	540	0.06%	6,250	0.79%	620	0.1%	130	0.02%	0	0%	35	0.1%	40	0.22%
Baltic	61,515	0.29%	42,140	0.55%	6,845	0.11%	5,240	0.24%	3,700	0.23%	1,845	0.19%	810	0.09%	535	0.07%	210	0.03%	100	0.02%	30	0.03%	40	0.11%	50	0.27%
Belgian	51,135	0.24%	19,955	0.26%	8,220	0.14%	4,840	0.22%	4,265	0.26%	9,055	0.92%	3,555	0.38%	665	0.08%	335	0.05%	50	0.01%	75	0.07%	70	0.2%	50	0.27%
Japanese	37,260	0.17%	15,600	0.2%	1,745	0.03%	13,585	0.62%	4,460	0.27%	1,335	0.14%	315	0.03%	85	0.01%	40	0.01%	20	0%	15	0.01%	15	0.04%	40	0.22%
Spanish	27,515	0.13%	10,330	0.13%	10,825	0.18%	3,070	0.14%	1,305	0.08%	640	0.06%	210	0.02%	640	0.08%	310	0.05%	110	0.02%	25	0.02%	30	0.09%	20	0.11%
Romanian	27,375	0.13%	9,255	0.12%	2,320	0.04%	3,765	0.17%	4,670	0.29%	1,375	0.14%	5,550	0.6%	240	0.03%	90	0.01%	10	0%	5	0%	25	0.07%	70	0.38%
Syrian–Lebanese	26,665	0.12%	10,540	0.14%	8,235	0.14%	785	0.04%	1,805	0.11%	945	0.1%	595	0.06%	2,005	0.25%	1,135	0.18%	405	0.08%	205	0.18%	5	0.01%	5	0.03%
British Isles, n.o.s.	1,615	0.01%	615	0.01%	245	0%	335	0.02%	190	0.01%	105	0.01%	75	0.01%	20	0%	10	0%	5	0%	0	0%	0	0%	5	0.03%
Other & Unknown	209,690	0.97%	91,285	1.19%	25,510	0.42%	33,745	1.54%	24,495	1.5%	11,395	1.15%	7,695	0.83%	4,345	0.55%	3,430	0.54%	6,655	1.27%	245	0.22%	495	1.42%	400	2.17%
Total responses	21,568,290	100%	7,703,120	100%	6,027,750	100%	2,184,610	100%	1,627,865	100%	988,245	100%	926,255	100%	788,960	100%	634,570	100%	522,110	100%	111,660	100.02%	34,820	100.04%	18,395	100.04%
Total population	21,568,311	100%	7,703,106	100%	6,027,764	100%	2,184,621	100%	1,627,874	100%	988,247	100%	926,242	100%	788,960	100%	634,557	100%	522,104	100%	111,641	100%	34,807	100%	18,388	100%
At the time of the 1971 Census, Canada comprised 12 major administrative units; ten provinces and two territories.

== See also ==
- Population and housing censuses by country
