= Rural Municipality of Longlaketon No. 219 =

Rural municipality in Saskatchewan, Canada

Longlaketon No. 219
- Rural municipality
- Rural Municipality of Longlaketon No. 219
- Location of the RM of Longlaketon No. 219 in Saskatchewan
- Coordinates: 50.785°N 104.702°W
- Country: Canada
- Province: Saskatchewan
- Census division: 6
- SARM division: 2
- Formed: December 12, 1910

Government
  - Reeve: Delbert Schmidt
  - Governing body: RM of Longlaketon No. 219 Council
  - Administrator: Courtney Huber
  - Office location: Earl Grey

Area (2016)
  - Land: 1,024.59 km^{2} (395.60 sq mi)

Population (2016)
  - Total: 1,016
  - Density: 1/km^{2} (2.6/sq mi)
- Time zone: CST
  - Summer (DST): CST
- Area codes: 306 and 639

The Rural Municipality of Longlaketon No. 219 (2016 population: 1,016) is a rural municipality (RM) in the Canadian province of Saskatchewan within Census Division No. 6 and SARM Division No. 2.

== History ==
The RM of Longlaketon No. 219 incorporated as a rural municipality on December 12, 1910.

Heritage properties

There are three historical sites located within the RM.

- Eddy School No. 1846 - Constructed in 1922, the site contains a one-room school house that served as a school from 1922–1936, 1943–1957. The school is located near Earl Grey.
- Longlaketon United Church (also called the Longlaketon Presbyterian Church) - Constructed in 1886, the building is now used as the Longlaketon Community Hall. Church services were held from 1886 to 1969.
- Zion (North Southey) Lutheran Church - Constructed in 1926, by immigrants from the imperial Austrian Empire, the church provides services in German until the 1960s.

== Geography ==
=== Communities and localities ===
The following urban municipalities are surrounded by the RM

Villages

- Craven
- Earl Grey
- Silton

The following unincorporated communities are located within the RM

Localities

- Fairy Hill
- Gibbs
- Serath

== Demographics ==
Population history (1981–2016)
Year	Pop.	±%
1981	1,108	—
1986	1,072	−3.2%
1991	1,035	−3.5%
1996	973	−6.0%
2001	940	−3.4%
2006	899	−4.4%
2011	962	+7.0%
2016	1,016	+5.6%
Source: Statistics Canada via Saskatchewan Bureau of Statistics

In the 2021 Census of Population conducted by Statistics Canada, the RM of Longlaketon No. 219 had a population of 1,096 living in 433 of its 495 total private dwellings, a change of 7.9% from its 2016 population of 1,016. With a land area of 1,022.45 km^{2} (394.77 sq mi), it had a population density of 1.1/km^{2} (2.8/sq mi) in 2021.

In the 2016 Census of Population, the RM of Longlaketon No. 219 recorded a population of 1,016 living in 384 of its 420 total private dwellings, a 5.6% change from its 2011 population of 962. With a land area of 1,024.59 km^{2} (395.60 sq mi), it had a population density of 1.0/km^{2} (2.6/sq mi) in 2016.

== Government ==
The RM of Longlaketon No. 219 is governed by an elected municipal council and an appointed administrator that meets on the second Tuesday of every month. The reeve of the RM is Delbert Schmidt while its administrator is Courtney Huber. The RM's office is located in Earl Grey.
