= 1986 Canadian census =

Canadian census

← 1981	June 3, 1986	1991 →

General information
- Country: Canada

Results
- Total population: 25,309,331 (▲4.0%)
- Most populous province/territory: Ontario (9,101,694)
- Least populous province/territory: Yukon (23,504)

The 1986 Canadian census was a detailed enumeration of the Canadian population. Census day was June 3, 1986. On that day, Statistics Canada attempted to count every person in Canada. The total population count of Canada was 25,309,331. This was a 4.0% increase over the 1981 census of 24,343,181.

The previous census was the 1981 census and the following census was in 1991 census.

== Canada by the numbers ==
A summary of information about Canada.

Total population	25,309,331
Dwellings	8,991,670
Men	12,485,650
Women	12,823,680
Average earnings	$23,265

== Population by province ==
Rank	Province or territory	Population as of 1986 census	Population as of 1981 census	Change	Percent change
1	Ontario	9,101,694	8,625,107	476,587 ▲	5.5 ▲
2	Quebec	6,532,461	6,438,403	94,058 ▲	1.5 ▲
3	British Columbia	2,883,367	2,744,467	138,900 ▲	5.1 ▲
4	Alberta	2,365,825	2,237,724	128,101 ▲	5.7 ▲
5	Manitoba	1,063,016	1,026,241	36,775 ▲	3.6 ▲
6	Saskatchewan	1,009,613	968,313	41,300 ▲	4.3 ▲
7	Nova Scotia	873,176	847,442	25,734 ▲	3.0 ▲
8	New Brunswick	709,442	696,403	13,039 ▲	1.9 ▲
9	Newfoundland and Labrador	568,349	567,681	688 ▲	0.1 ▲
10	Prince Edward Island	126,646	122,506	4,140 ▲	3.4 ▲
11	Northwest Territories	52,238	45,741	6,497 ▲	14.2 ▲
12	Yukon	23,504	23,153	351 ▲	1.5 ▲
	Canada	25,309,331	24,343,181	966,150 ▲	4.0 ▲

== See also ==
- Population and housing censuses by country
