= Saskatchewan Highway 379 =

Provincial highway in Saskatchewan, Canada

Highway 379

Route information
- Maintained by Ministry of Highways and Infrastructure
- Length: 18.4 km (11.4 mi)

Major junctions
- West end: Highway 4 / Highway 721 near Wymark
- East end: Township Road 132 at McMahon

Location
- Country: Canada
- Province: Saskatchewan
- Rural municipalities: Swift Current, Coulee

Highway system
- Provincial highways in Saskatchewan
← Highway 378	→ Highway 381

Highway 379 is a provincial highway in the Canadian province of Saskatchewan. It runs from Highway 4 near Wymark to Township Road 132 at McMahon. It is about 18 kilometres (11 mi) long.

The highway passes near the communities of Schoenfeld, Schoenwiese, Chortitz, and Rheinfeld and has a 15-kilometre (9.3 mi) long concurrency with Highway 721.

== Route description ==
Hwy 379 begins in the Rural Municipality of Swift Current No. 137 at a junction with Hwy 4 just outside of Wymark, with the road continuing west as Hwy 721. Heading east, concurrent with Hwy 721, it crosses a small creek to travel through the southern part of the hamlet, where it crosses Canadian National Railway's Vanguard subdivision, before leaving Wymark and travelling just to the north of Schoenfeld, connected via Range Road 3132, and just to the south of Schoenwiese, connected via Range Road 3131. Entering the Rural Municipality of Coulee No. 136 as it travels along the north side of Chortitz, the highway travels to the south of Rosenort, connected via Range Road 3123, and Rheinfeld, connected via an access road, before coming to the intersection between Township Road 134 and Range Road 3122, with Hwy 721 continuing east along Township Road 134 while Hwy 379 turns south along Range Road 3122. Not long after, Hwy 379 enters the hamlet of McMahon via crossing a small stream, where it crosses a former railway line shortly before coming to an end at the intersection with Township Road 132, with Range Road 3122 continuing south as a municipal road. The entire length of Hwy 379 is a paved, two-lane highway.

== Major intersections ==
From west to east:

Rural municipality	Location	km	mi	Destinations	Notes
Swift Current No. 137		0.0	0.0	Highway 4 – Cadillac, Swift Current Highway 721 west (Township Road 134) – Duncairn Dam	Western terminus; road continues west as Hwy 721 westbound; western end of Hwy 721 concurrency
Swift Current No. 137	Wymark	1.6	0.99	Bigford Avenue – Springfeld	
Swift Current No. 137		4.9	3.0	Range Road 3132 – Schoenfeld	
Swift Current No. 137		6.5	4.0	Range Road 3131 – Schoenwiese	
Coulee No. 136		13.0	8.1	Range Road 3123 – Rosenort	
Coulee No. 136		13.8	8.6	Rheinfeld access road	
Coulee No. 136		14.7	9.1	Highway 721 east (Township Road 134) – Hallonquist	Eastern end of Hwy 721 concurrency; Hwy 379 turns south along Range Road 3122
Coulee No. 136	McMahon	18.4	11.4	Township Road 132 / Range Road 3122	Eastern terminus; road continues south as Range Road 3122
1.000 mi = 1.609 km; 1.000 km = 0.621 mi: Concurrency terminus

== See also ==
- Transportation in Saskatchewan
- Roads in Saskatchewan
