= Cabri =

Cabri may refer to:

- Cabri, Saskatchewan, Canada
- Cabri Airport, airport in Cabri, Saskatchewan
- Cabri Geometry, an interactive geometry program
- Cabri Lake, Saskatchewan, Canada
- Guimbal Cabri G2, a French light helicopter
- Le Cabri, French automobile manufactured from 1924 to 1925
- Louis J. Cabri (born 1934), Canadian scientist
