= Chortitz, Saskatchewan =

Community in Saskatchewan, Canada

Chortitz
- Organized Hamlet
- Location within Coulee No. 136 Location within Saskatchewan
- Coordinates: 50.1061°N 107.6406°W
- Country: Canada
- Province: Saskatchewan
- Region: Southwest
- Census division: 7
- Rural municipality: Coulee No. 136

Government
  - Reeve: Greg Targerson
  - Administrator: Ken Hollinger
  - Governing body: Coulee No. 136

Area
  - Total: 0.21 km^{2} (0.081 sq mi)

Population (2006)
  - Total: 26
  - Density: 122.6/km^{2} (318/sq mi)
- Time zone: CST
- Postal code: S9H 1K8
- Area code: 306
- Highways: Highway 379

Chortitz is a hamlet in the Rural Municipality of Coulee No. 136, Saskatchewan, Canada. Listed as a designated place by Statistics Canada, the hamlet had a population of 26 in the Canada 2006 Census. The hamlet is located on Highway 379, about 25 kilometres (16 mi) south of Swift Current.

== Name ==
The name "Chortitz" is of Ukrainian origin, derived from the place name of Khortytsia in Zaporizhzhia, Ukraine.

== Demographics ==
In the 2021 Census of Population conducted by Statistics Canada, Chortitz had a population of 15 living in 7 of its 7 total private dwellings, a change of −21.1% from its 2016 population of 19. With a land area of 0.21 km^{2} (0.081 sq mi), it had a population density of 71.4/km^{2} (185.0/sq mi) in 2021.

== See also ==
- List of communities in Saskatchewan
- List of hamlets in Saskatchewan
- Chortitz, Manitoba
