= Rural Municipality of Corman Park No. 344 =

Rural municipality in Saskatchewan, Canada

Corman Park No. 344
- Rural municipality
- Rural Municipality of Corman Park No. 344
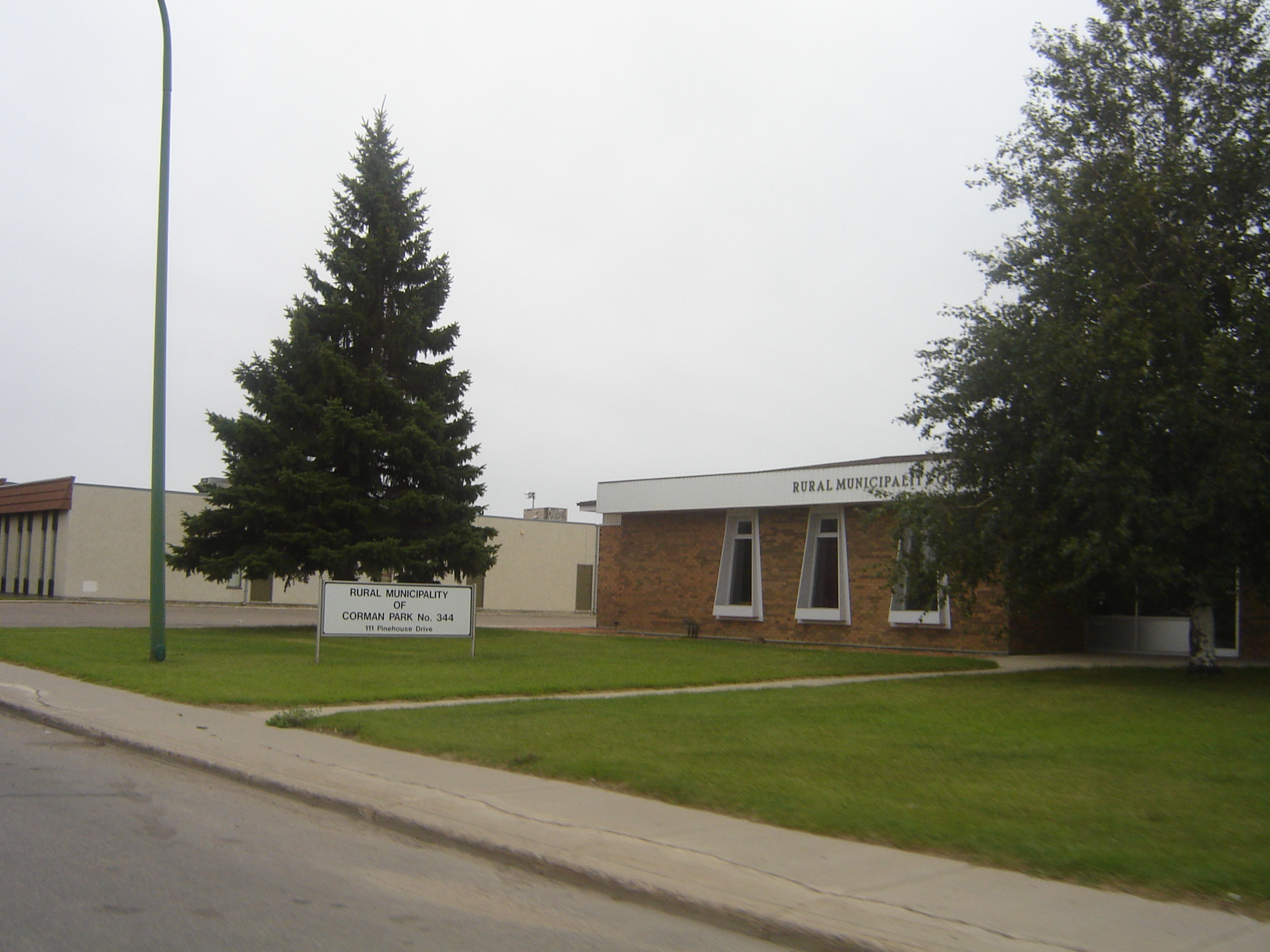
- RM office and police station

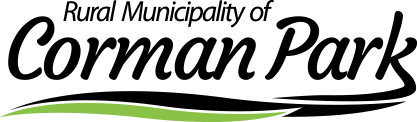
- Logo

- Location of the RM of Corman Park No. 344 in Saskatchewan
- Coordinates: 52.241°N 106.669°W
- Country: Canada
- Province: Saskatchewan
- Census division: 11
- SARM division: 5
- Federal riding: Carlton Trail—Eagle Creek
- Provincial riding: Martensville-Blairmore; Warman; Rosetown-Delisle; Batoche; Humboldt-Watrous; Dakota-Arm River
- Formed: January 1, 1970
- Amalgamated: December 31, 1969 (RMs of Cory No. 344, Warman No. 374 and Park No. 375)

Government
  - Reeve: Joe Hargrave
  - Governing body: RM of Corman Park No. 344 Council
  - Chief Administrative Officer: Ken Kolb
  - Office location: Saskatoon

Area (2016)
  - Land: 1,911.35 km^{2} (737.98 sq mi)

Population (2021)
  - Total: 8,909
  - Density: 4.7/km^{2} (12/sq mi)
- Time zone: CST
  - Summer (DST): CST
- Postal code: S7K 5W1
- Area codes: 306 and 639
- Website: Official website

The Rural Municipality of Corman Park No. 344 (2021 population: 8,909) is a rural municipality (RM) in the Canadian province of Saskatchewan within Census Division No. 11 and SARM Division No. 5. Located in the central portion of the province, the RM surrounds the City of Saskatoon.

== History ==
The RM of Corman Park No. 344 was formed by the amalgamation of three rural municipalities – the RMs of Cory No. 344, Warman No. 374 and Park No. 375. The three RMs were disorganized on December 31, 1969 to enable the incorporation of the RM of Corman Park No. 344 on January 1, 1970.

Heritage properties

Two designated historical properties are located in the RM.

- Opimihaw (now referred to as Wanuskewin Heritage Park) is a 58 hectare property with 14 precontact archaeological sites in the Opimihaw Creek valley.
- Bone Trail in the 1800s buffalo bones were collected on the prairie, and transported along this trail to Saskatoon for transfer onto rail cars so that they could be sent to eastern Canada where they were crushed into fertilizer.

== Geography ==
The South Saskatchewan River flows from the southwest corner to the northeast corner of the RM while the North Saskatchewan River forms the RM's northwest boundary. The RM works closely with the Meewasin Valley Authority to protect the South Saskatchewan River valley.

=== Communities and localities ===
The following urban municipalities are surrounded by the RM.

Cities

- Martensville
- Saskatoon
- Warman

Towns

- Dalmeny
- Langham
- Osler

The following unincorporated communities are within the RM.

Organized hamlets

- Beaver Creek
- Casa Rio
- Cathedral Bluffs
- Cedar Villa Estates
- Discovery Ridge
- Eagle Ridge Country Estates
- Furdale
- Merrill Hills
- Neuhorst
- River's Edge
- Riverside Estates

Localities

- Bergheim
- Blumenheim
- Cory
- Floral
- Grasswood
- Haultain
- Rheinland
- South Corman Park

== Demographics ==
Population history (1981–2016)
Year	Pop.	±%
1981	6,357	—
1986	6,506	+2.3%
1991	6,809	+4.7%
1996	7,152	+5.0%
2001	8,093	+13.2%
2006	8,349	+3.2%
2011	8,354	+0.1%
2016	8,568	+2.6%
2021	8,909	+4.0%
Source: Statistics Canada via Saskatchewan Bureau of Statistics

In the 2021 Census of Population conducted by Statistics Canada, the RM of Corman Park No. 344 had a population of 8,909 living in 3,096 of its 3,280 total private dwellings, a change of 4.1% from its 2016 population of 8,558. With a land area of 1,893.24 km^{2} (730.98 sq mi), it had a population density of 4.7/km^{2} (12.2/sq mi) in 2021.

In the 2016 Census of Population, the RM of Corman Park No. 344 recorded a population of 8,568 living in 2,952 of its 3,037 total private dwellings, a 3.5% change from its 2011 population of 8,277. With a land area of 1,911.35 km^{2} (737.98 sq mi), it had a population density of 4.5/km^{2} (11.6/sq mi) in 2016.

The RM's German Canadian population is much higher proportionately than the national or provincial averages: 43.4% (3,645 persons).

Mother tongue (2021):

- English as first language: 87.0%
- French as first language: 1.1%
- English and French as first languages: 0.2%
- Other as first language: 10.6%

== Government ==
The RM of Corman Park No. 344 is governed by an elected municipal council and an appointed administrator that meets on the second and third Monday of every month. The reeve of the RM is Judy Harwood while its Chief Administrative Officer is Ken Kolb. The RM's office is located in Saskatoon. As of November 2024 the reeve is Joe Hargrave, and the eight councillors are:

- Division 1: John Germs
- Division 2: John Saleski
- Division 3: Lyndon Haduik
- Division 4: David Greenwood
- Division 5: Arthur Pruim
- Division 6: Bas Froese-Kooijenga;
- Division 7: Calvin Vaandrager
- Division 8: Wendy Trask

A majority of voters in a November 2011 plebiscite favoured the council be changed from 11 to 8 councillors, a move that was controversial. The elected councillors of the day requested that the provincial government not take action on the plebiscite. However, the request was ignored and the municipal boundaries were redrawn with 8 divisions. A new council was elected on February 29, 2012, with four incumbents and four new councillors.

=== Emergency response ===
Heraldic badge Corman Park Police Service

The RM of Corman Park No. 344 contracts with the City of Saskatoon and the other municipalities for the provision of fire protection.

The RM operates a police service of 10 officers who work in partnership with the Royal Canadian Mounted Police (RCMP). Corman Park Police Service actively partners with all other law enforcement agencies in the Saskatoon and district police universe including the Saskatoon Police Service and Dalmeny Police Service.

The Corman Park Police Service acts in partnership with the RCMP under the terms of Order in Council (OIC) 109/2001 as amended by OIC 92/2006. The service operates out of the municipal office in Saskatoon.

== Attractions ==
In the RM of Corman Park, along the southern banks of the North Saskatchewan River, near the Highway 16 bridge, is Borden Bridge Recreation Site (52.3779°N 107.1419°W). The 15-hectare park has a campground and picnic area as well as access to the North Saskatchewan River and the abandoned Borden Bridge.

The RM of Corman Park is home to a Super Dual Auroral Radar Network radar site operated by the University of Saskatchewan.

== Cranberry Flats Conservation Area ==
The Cranberry Flats Conservation Area (52.0311°N 106.7005°W) is a regional park operated by the Meewasin Valley Authority along the banks of the South Saskatchewan River about 8 kilometres (5.0 mi) south of Saskatoon. The park is a "sand-based conservation area" with sandy beaches, self-guided nature trails, and a lookout. Access is from Highway 219. Adjacent to Cranberry Flats, in the middle of the river, is a protected area called Wilson Island. On the opposite shore is Poplar Bluffs Conservation area and about 7 km (4.3 mi) to the south is Beaver Creek Conservation Area. These sites are also operated by the Meewasin Valley Authority.

== Transportation ==
Rail

- Colonsay Branch C.P.R—serves Saskatoon, Colonsay, Forslund, Zangwill, Young and Plassey.
- Minnedosa–Saskatoon–Edmonton Section C.P.R—serves Colonsay, Elstow, Blucher, Cheviot, Floral, Sutherland, Saskatoon, Cory, Dunfermline, Asquith, Rhyl, Kinley, Perdue Keppel, Vance and Biggar.
- Carlton Branch, C.N.R—serves Saskatoon, Warman, Dalmeny
- Delisle Elrose Branch C.N.R—serves Saskatoon, Delisle, Birdview, Swanson and Ardath.
- Regina Branch, C.N.R—serves Kenaston, Strong, Hanley, Indi, Dundurn, Strehlow, Haultain, Grasswood, Nutana, Saskatoon, Clarks Crossing, Warmsn and Osler.
- Winnipeg, Edmonton, Prince Rupert Division, C.N.R—serves Winnipeg, Saskatoon, Edmonton and Jasper.

Air

- Saskatoon/Banga International Air Aerodrome (id: CJN5; aka "Corman Park Airport") formerly Saskatoon/Corman Air Park

== See also ==
- List of rural municipalities in Saskatchewan
