= Mantario =

Community in Saskatchewan, Canada

- Special service area
- Special Service Area of Mantario
- Location within Chesterfield No. 261 Location within Saskatchewan
- Coordinates: 51.2623°N 109.6991°W
- Country: Canada
- Province: Saskatchewan
- Region: Saskatchewan
- Census division: 8
- Rural Municipality: Chesterfield No. 261
- Post office founded: March 1, 1912 (closed March 27, 1986)
- Incorporated (village): N/A
- Incorporated (town): N/A

Government
  - Reeve: Karrie Derouin
  - Administrator: Beverly Dahl
  - Governing body: Chesterfield No. 261

Area
  - Total: 0.78 km^{2} (0.30 sq mi)

Population (2011)
  - Total: 5
  - Density: 6.4/km^{2} (17/sq mi)
- Time zone: CST
- Postal code: S0L 2J0
- Area code: 306
- Highways: Highway 44

Mantario is a special service area in the Rural Municipality of Chesterfield No. 261 in the Canadian province of Saskatchewan.It held village status prior to June 30, 2007. The population was five people in 2011. The community is located 70 kilometres (43 mi) southwest of the town of Kindersley on Highway 44.

Mantario is a portmanteau of Manitoba and Ontario. It was named after two provinces in imitation of nearby Alsask.

== Demographics ==
In the 2021 Census of Population conducted by Statistics Canada, Mantario had a population of 15 living in 5 of its 7 total private dwellings, a change of 200% from its 2016 population of 5. With a land area of 0.77 km^{2} (0.30 sq mi), it had a population density of 19.5/km^{2} (50.5/sq mi) in 2021.

Canada census – Mantario community profile

	2011
Population	5 (-50.0% from 2006)
Land area	0.78 km^{2} (0.30 sq mi)
Population density	6.4/km^{2} (17/sq mi)
Median age	NA (M: NA, F: NA)
Private dwellings	9 (total)
Median household income	$NA

References: 2011

== See also ==
- List of communities in Saskatchewan
- List of hamlets in Saskatchewan
- List of geographic names derived from portmanteaus
