= Maxwellton, Saskatchewan =

Community in Saskatchewan, Canada

- Hamlet
- Location within Saskatchewan
- Coordinates: 49.7000°N 105.5506°W
- Country: Canada
- Province: Saskatchewan
- Region: South Central
- Rural Municipality: Excel

Government
  - Governing body: Excel No. 71
  - MLA: Dave Marit
  - MP: Jeremy Patzer
- Time zone: CST
- Postal code: S0N
- Area code: 306

Maxwellton is a hamlet in the Rural Municipality of Excel No. 71, Saskatchewan, Canada.

== See also ==
- List of communities in Saskatchewan
- List of hamlets in Saskatchewan
