= Schoenfeld, Saskatchewan =

Community in Saskatchewan, Canada

Coordinates: 50.089225°N 107.689109°W

Location of Schoenfeld in Saskatchewan

Schoenfeld is a hamlet in Saskatchewan, Canada. It is just south of Highway 379 in the Rural Municipality of Swift Current No. 137.

== See also ==
- List of communities in Saskatchewan
