= Alsask Lake =

Lake in Saskatchewan, Canada

- Location in Saskatchewan Alsask Lake (Canada)
- Location: RM of Chesterfield No. 261, Saskatchewan
- Coordinates: 51.3359°N 109.8798°W
- Type: Endorheic lake
- Part of: Saskatchewan River drainage basin
- Primary outflows: None
- Basin countries: Canada
- Surface area: 203.4 ha (503 acres)
- Max. depth: 2.8 m (9 ft 2 in)
- Shore length^{1}: 1.2 km (0.75 mi)
- Surface elevation: 664 m (2,178 ft)
- Settlements: none
- ^{1} Shore length is not a well-defined measure.

Alsask Lake is a closed basin lake in the Canadian province of Saskatchewan, about 10 kilometres (6.2 mi) south-east of Alsask. The lake is a natural source for sodium sulfate and until 1991 an extraction plant was operated by Francanna Minerals (Sodium Sulfate Company).

== Climate ==
Alsask experiences a semi-arid climate (Köppen climate classification: BSk). Winters are long, cold and dry, while summers are short and warm. Precipitation is low, with an annual average of 299.8 mm (11.80 in), and is heavily concentrated in the warmer months.

The weather station is located adjacent to the lake.

Climate data for Alsask Hardene Climate ID: 4020130; coordinates 51°20′N 109°51′W; elevation: 658.4 m (2,160 ft); 1981–2010 normals, extremes 1959–1997
Month	Jan	Feb	Mar	Apr	May	Jun	Jul	Aug	Sep	Oct	Nov	Dec	Year
Record high °C (°F)	12.2 (54.0)	15.5 (59.9)	21.7 (71.1)	31.5 (88.7)	35.0 (95.0)	38.0 (100.4)	38.5 (101.3)	41.7 (107.1)	36.7 (98.1)	29.0 (84.2)	21.1 (70.0)	12.8 (55.0)	41.7 (107.1)
Mean daily maximum °C (°F)	−7.1 (19.2)	−4.4 (24.1)	2.9 (37.2)	12.6 (54.7)	18.9 (66.0)	23.3 (73.9)	25.7 (78.3)	25.6 (78.1)	18.8 (65.8)	11.8 (53.2)	−0.6 (30.9)	−6.5 (20.3)	10.1 (50.2)
Daily mean °C (°F)	−12.7 (9.1)	−9.9 (14.2)	−2.6 (27.3)	5.4 (41.7)	11.5 (52.7)	16.2 (61.2)	18.3 (64.9)	17.8 (64.0)	11.5 (52.7)	4.9 (40.8)	−5.8 (21.6)	−11.9 (10.6)	3.6 (38.5)
Mean daily minimum °C (°F)	−18.2 (−0.8)	−15.4 (4.3)	−8.1 (17.4)	−1.8 (28.8)	4.1 (39.4)	9.0 (48.2)	10.8 (51.4)	9.9 (49.8)	4.1 (39.4)	−2.1 (28.2)	−10.9 (12.4)	−17.1 (1.2)	−3.0 (26.6)
Record low °C (°F)	−46.7 (−52.1)	−43.5 (−46.3)	−36.7 (−34.1)	−31.1 (−24.0)	−9.4 (15.1)	−5.0 (23.0)	1.7 (35.1)	−2.2 (28.0)	−11.7 (10.9)	−27.5 (−17.5)	−36.5 (−33.7)	−44.4 (−47.9)	−46.7 (−52.1)
Average precipitation mm (inches)	8.8 (0.35)	6.2 (0.24)	14.1 (0.56)	17.6 (0.69)	42.9 (1.69)	54.0 (2.13)	59.6 (2.35)	35.0 (1.38)	23.9 (0.94)	12.4 (0.49)	14.0 (0.55)	11.5 (0.45)	299.8 (11.80)
Average rainfall mm (inches)	0.7 (0.03)	0.2 (0.01)	3.4 (0.13)	13.4 (0.53)	42.1 (1.66)	54.0 (2.13)	59.6 (2.35)	35.0 (1.38)	21.0 (0.83)	7.5 (0.30)	1.5 (0.06)	0.5 (0.02)	238.8 (9.40)
Average snowfall cm (inches)	8.1 (3.2)	6.0 (2.4)	10.7 (4.2)	4.2 (1.7)	0.7 (0.3)	0.0 (0.0)	0.0 (0.0)	0.0 (0.0)	2.9 (1.1)	4.9 (1.9)	12.5 (4.9)	11.0 (4.3)	61.0 (24.0)
Average precipitation days (≥ 0.2 mm)	5.9	4.7	6.4	7.3	10.5	12.0	11.3	9.2	7.9	6.0	6.9	5.9	93.9
Average rainy days (≥ 0.2 mm)	0.18	0.12	1.70	5.20	10.40	12.00	11.30	9.20	7.90	4.60	1.10	0.38	64.10
Average snowy days (≥ 0.2 cm)	5.90	4.50	5.10	2.40	0.35	0.00	0.00	0.00	0.53	1.80	5.90	5.70	32.10
Source: Environment and Climate Change Canada

== Fish species ==
Fish commonly found in Alsask Lake include northern pike.

== See also ==
- List of lakes of Saskatchewan
