= Readlyn =

Readlyn may refer to:

- Readlyn, Iowa, United States
- Readlyn, Saskatchewan, Canada
