= Rosengart, Saskatchewan =

Locality in Saskatchewan, Canada

Coordinates: 50°11′00″N 107°43′02″W

Location of Rosengart in Saskatchewan

Rosengart is a hamlet in the Rural Municipality of Swift Current No. 137 in Saskatchewan, Canada.

== See also ==
- List of communities in Saskatchewan
