= Discovery Ridge =

Discovery Ridge can be:

- Discovery Ridge, Calgary: a residential neighbourhood in Calgary
- Discovery Ridge, Antarctica in the Ohio Range of Antarctica
- Discovery Ridge (research park): a research park in Columbia, Missouri, owned and operated by the University of Missouri System
- Discovery Ridge, Saskatchewan: an organized hamlet in central Saskatchewan
