= Eyre, Saskatchewan =

Hamlet in Saskatchewan, Canada

Eyre
- Unincorporated Hamlet
- Location of Eyre in Saskatchewan Eyre (Canada)
- Coordinates: 51.2667250°N 109.8174518°W
- Country: Canada
- Province: Saskatchewan
- Region: Southwest Saskatchewan
- Census division: 8
- Rural Municipality: Chesterfield
- Established: 1910
- Post Office Established: August 1, 1914
- Post Office Closed: December 9, 1963
- Postal code: NA
- Area code: 306
- Highways: Highway 44

Eyre is a ghost town in Chesterfield Rural Municipality, Saskatchewan, Canada. Originally established by the Jewish Colonization Association. The Jewish block settlement was established in 1910 mostly of immigrants from Russia and some from the United States.

== See also ==
- List of communities in Saskatchewan
- List of hamlets in Saskatchewan
- Lists of ghost towns in Canada
- List of ghost towns in Saskatchewan
