= McMahon, Saskatchewan =

Community in Saskatchewan, Canada

McMahon
- Hamlet
- Location within Coulee No. 136 Location within Saskatchewan
- Coordinates: 50.0738°N 107.5559°W
- Country: Canada
- Province: Saskatchewan
- Region: Southwest
- Census division: 7
- Rural municipality: Coulee No. 136

Government
  - Reeve: Greg Targerson
  - Administrator: Ken Hollinger
  - Governing body: Coulee No. 136

Population (2006)
  - Total: 0
- Time zone: CST
- Postal code: S9H 1K8
- Area code: 306
- Highways: Highway 379

McMahon is a hamlet in the Rural Municipality of Coulee No. 136, Saskatchewan, Canada. The hamlet is located on Highway 376, about 40 kilometres (25 mi) southeast of Swift Current. The population at the 1931 census was 88.

== See also ==
- List of communities in Saskatchewan
- List of hamlets in Saskatchewan
- Poverty Valley Aerodrome
