= Schoenwiese =

Community in Saskatchewan, Canada

- Hamlet
- Location within Saskatchewan Location within Canada
- Coordinates: 50.1333°N 107.6506°W
- Country: Canada
- Province: Saskatchewan
- Region: Southwest
- Census division: 8
- Rural municipality: Swift Current No. 137

Government
  - Reeve: Jerry Knipfel
  - Administrator: Dave Dmytruk
  - Governing body: Swift Current No. 137

Population (2006)
  - Total: 0
- Time zone: CST
- Postal code: S9H 5J5
- Area code: 306
- Highways: Highway 379

Schoenwiese is a hamlet in the Rural Municipality of Swift Current No. 137, Saskatchewan, Canada. The hamlet is located on Range Road 3131 about 2 kilometres (1.2 mi) north of Highway 379, about 15 kilometres (9.3 mi) south of Swift Current.

== See also ==
- List of communities in Saskatchewan
- List of hamlets in Saskatchewan
- Russian Mennonite
