= Ormiston, Saskatchewan =

Community in Saskatchewan, Canada

Coordinates: 49°44′17″N 105°23′37″W

Location of Ormiston in Saskatchewan

Ormiston is an organized hamlet in the Rural Municipality of Excel No. 71, Saskatchewan, Canada. The population was 25 at the 2011 Census. It is located in the south-central portion of the province, south of the city of Moose Jaw.

== Demographics ==
In the 2021 Census of Population conducted by Statistics Canada, Ormiston had a population of 10 living in 6 of its 11 total private dwellings, a change of 0% from its 2016 population of 10. With a land area of 0.35 km^{2} (0.14 sq mi), it had a population density of 28.6/km^{2} (74.0/sq mi) in 2021.

Canada census – Ormiston, Saskatchewan community profile

	2011
Population	25 (66.7% from 2006)
Land area	0.34 km^{2} (0.13 sq mi)
Population density	74.4/km^{2} (193/sq mi)
Median age
Private dwellings	13 (total)
Median household income

References: 2011

== Climate ==
Climate data for Ormiston
Month	Jan	Feb	Mar	Apr	May	Jun	Jul	Aug	Sep	Oct	Nov	Dec	Year
Record high °C (°F)	11 (52)	17 (63)	22.8 (73.0)	31.5 (88.7)	37 (99)	40 (104)	39 (102)	39 (102)	37 (99)	34 (93)	23.3 (73.9)	13 (55)	40 (104)
Mean daily maximum °C (°F)	−8.2 (17.2)	−5 (23)	1.8 (35.2)	11.3 (52.3)	18.6 (65.5)	23.4 (74.1)	26.1 (79.0)	25.5 (77.9)	19 (66)	11.9 (53.4)	1.1 (34.0)	−5.9 (21.4)	10 (50)
Daily mean °C (°F)	−13.6 (7.5)	−10.4 (13.3)	−3.5 (25.7)	4.9 (40.8)	11.9 (53.4)	16.7 (62.1)	19.2 (66.6)	18.4 (65.1)	12.2 (54.0)	5.5 (41.9)	−4 (25)	−11.4 (11.5)	3.8 (38.8)
Mean daily minimum °C (°F)	−18.9 (−2.0)	−15.6 (3.9)	−8.8 (16.2)	−1.5 (29.3)	5.2 (41.4)	10 (50)	12.3 (54.1)	11.2 (52.2)	5.3 (41.5)	−0.9 (30.4)	−9 (16)	−16.9 (1.6)	−2.3 (27.9)
Record low °C (°F)	−48.3 (−54.9)	−41 (−42)	−38.3 (−36.9)	−28.9 (−20.0)	−11.7 (10.9)	−5 (23)	2.8 (37.0)	0 (32)	−7.8 (18.0)	−23 (−9)	−35 (−31)	−43.5 (−46.3)	−48.3 (−54.9)
Average precipitation mm (inches)	11 (0.4)	9.1 (0.36)	16.2 (0.64)	19.2 (0.76)	49.2 (1.94)	65.3 (2.57)	56.1 (2.21)	41.7 (1.64)	32.6 (1.28)	18.2 (0.72)	10.6 (0.42)	13 (0.5)	342.2 (13.47)
Source: Environment Canada

== See also ==
- List of communities in Saskatchewan
- List of hamlets in Saskatchewan
