= CFS Alsask =

Canadian forces base in Saskatchewan, Canada

- Alsask, Saskatchewan
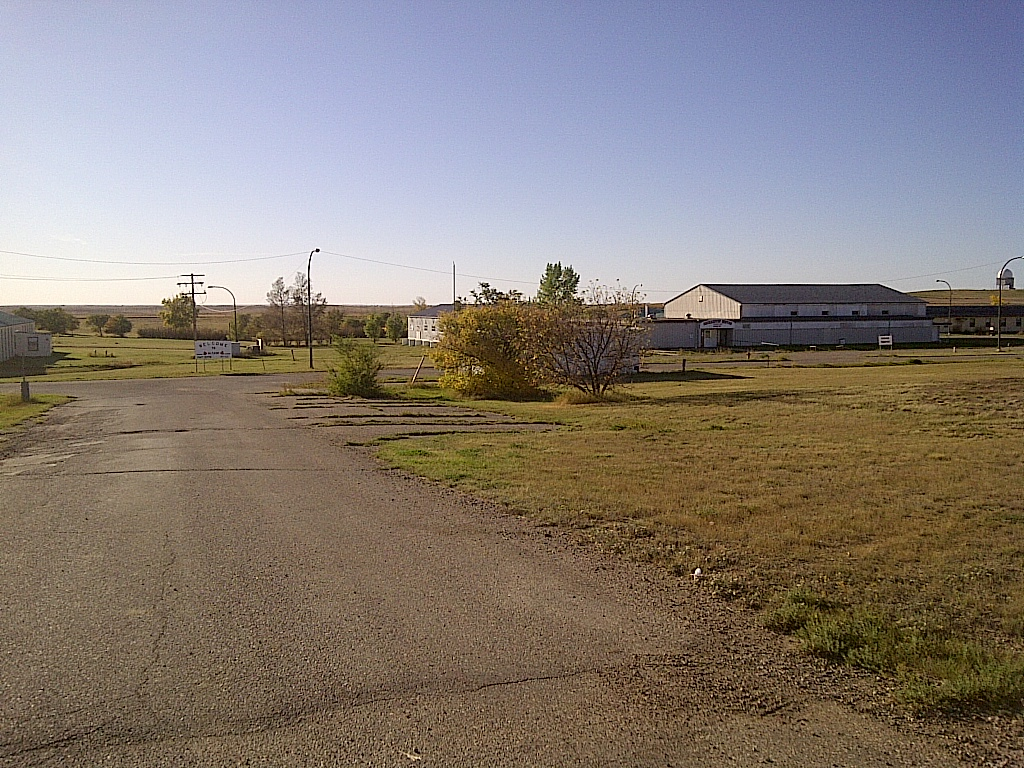
- Former military station Alsask in 2011

Site information
- Type: Radar Station
- Code: C-53
- Controlled by: Royal Canadian Air Force

Location
- Location of CFS Alsask in Saskatchewan
- Coordinates: 51°23′31″N 110°00′10″W

Site history
- Built: 1963
- Built by: Royal Canadian Air Force
- In use: 1963-1986

Canadian Forces Station Alsask (CFS Alsask) was a military radar station in the Rural Municipality of Milton No. 292, just north of the hamlet of Alsask, Saskatchewan, Canada, a village on the Alberta-Saskatchewan border. It is within the Rural Municipality of Milton No. 292.

RCAF Station Alsask was opened in 1963 as part of the Pinetree Line of NORAD radar stations. The station was later renamed CFS Alsask when the military branches were merged. The station was part of 44 Radar Squadron and had a call sign of November, Jade Ring. The station was disbanded in 1987 and has been taken over by the village. The station property became part of the Rural Municipality of Milton when the village of Alsask was dissolved in 2009.

The station consisted of three radar domes, housing, a school, swimming pool, with a staff complement of 125 (military) and 60 civilian workers.

== Alsask Radar Dome ==
The last remaining radar dome (51.3921°N 110.0033°W), built in 1961, was designated a heritage property in 2002.

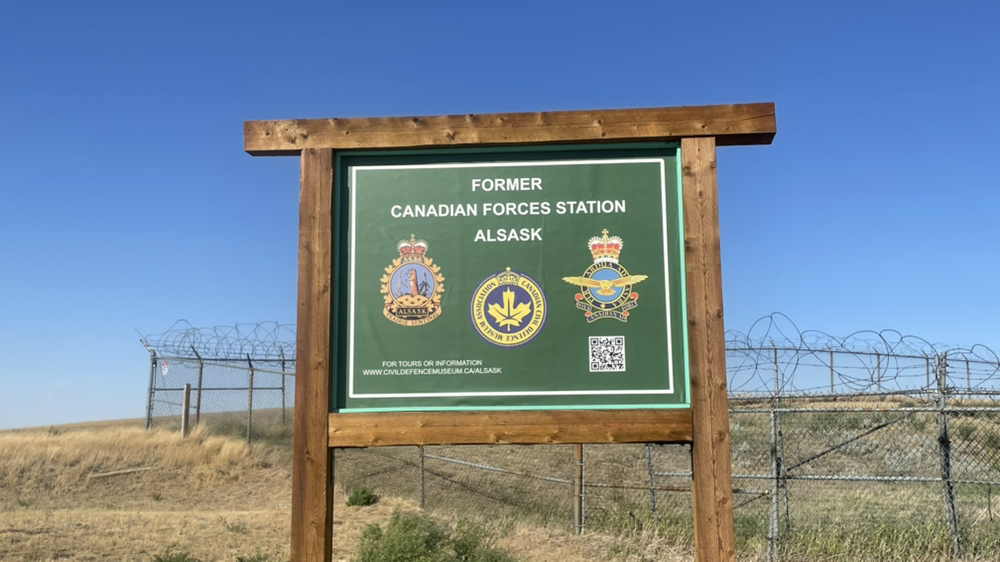
Entrance Sign at the Dome

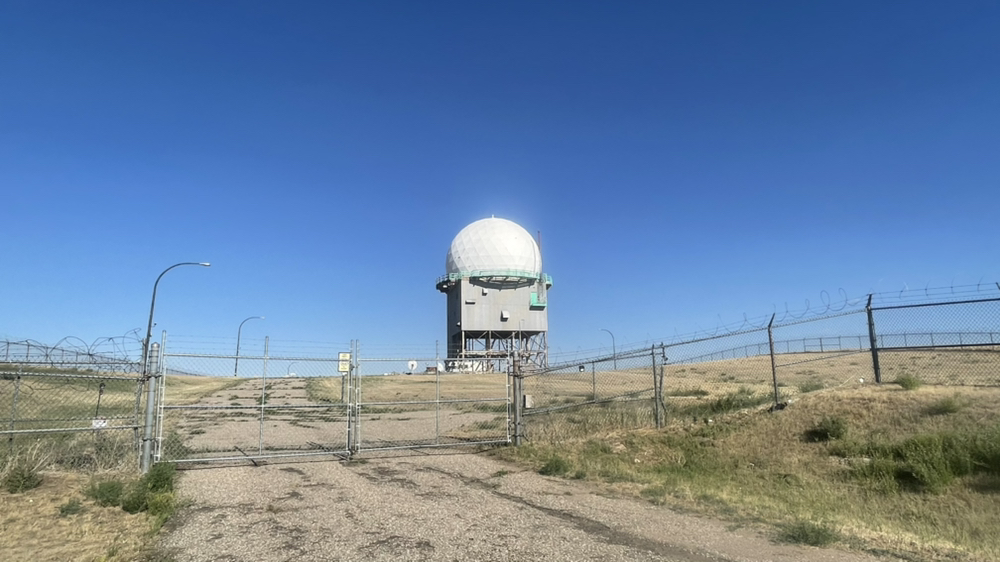
CFD Alsask Radar Dome

The structure situated on the 7 acres of land houses a fiberglass dome used to protect the radar equipment from the weather on a four-story tower, with the lower stories consisting of a computer level and command/control level. It was jointly utilized by the Canadian and American governments for monitoring Soviet activity in the North American airspace. The first floor contained the receiving equipment and the second floor housed the transmitting equipment.

It was disbanded in 1987 and was designated a heritage property in 2002.

The site is currently managed by the Canadian Civil Defence Museum and Archives and is open periodically for tours.

=== Construction ===
Construction of the dome began in 1961 and the dome was completed two years later. The dome, which protects the radar equipment, is made of fibreglass. The tower itself is made of steel with metal cladding.
