= Old Alsask School =

Building in Saskatchewan, Canada

- Interactive map of the Old Alsask School area

General information
- Architectural style: Georgian Revival and Romanesque Revival
- Location: Alsask, Saskatchewan, Canada
- Coordinates: 51.3757°N 109.9926°W

The Old Alsask School is a municipal-designated historic, two story building located in the hamlet of Alsask in the Rural Municipality of Milton, Saskatchewan, Canada. The building is of a Georgian Revival and Romanesque Revival style originally built in 1913 as a regional primary and secondary school serving Alsask as well as other communities in the region. It replaced an older one room schoolhouse. In 1976 the school was closed and the building purchased by the municipality, it has subsequently been converted into a community hall.
