= Beverley, Saskatchewan =

Coordinates: 50°15′58″N 107°58′31″W

Location of Beverley in Saskatchewan

Beverley is an unincorporated community in the Rural Municipality of Swift Current No. 137, Saskatchewan. Located just west of the city of Swift Current, it lies along the Trans-Canada Highway (Highway 1), near its intersections with Highway 630 and Highway 32. Canadian Pacific Railway's Maple Creek Subdivision passes through the community.

== History ==
The town was originally named Levine. it was changed to Beverly Station in 1882 when the CPR railway arrived. The name was in honor of Beverly Seward Webb, a railway official. The Post Office opened April 15, 1910. The name was changed to Beverly on May 16, 1957. The Post Office closed on August 27, 1958.
