= Rural Municipality of Swift Current No. 137 =

Rural municipality in Saskatchewan, Canada

Swift Current No. 137
- Rural municipality
- Rural Municipality of Swift Current No. 137
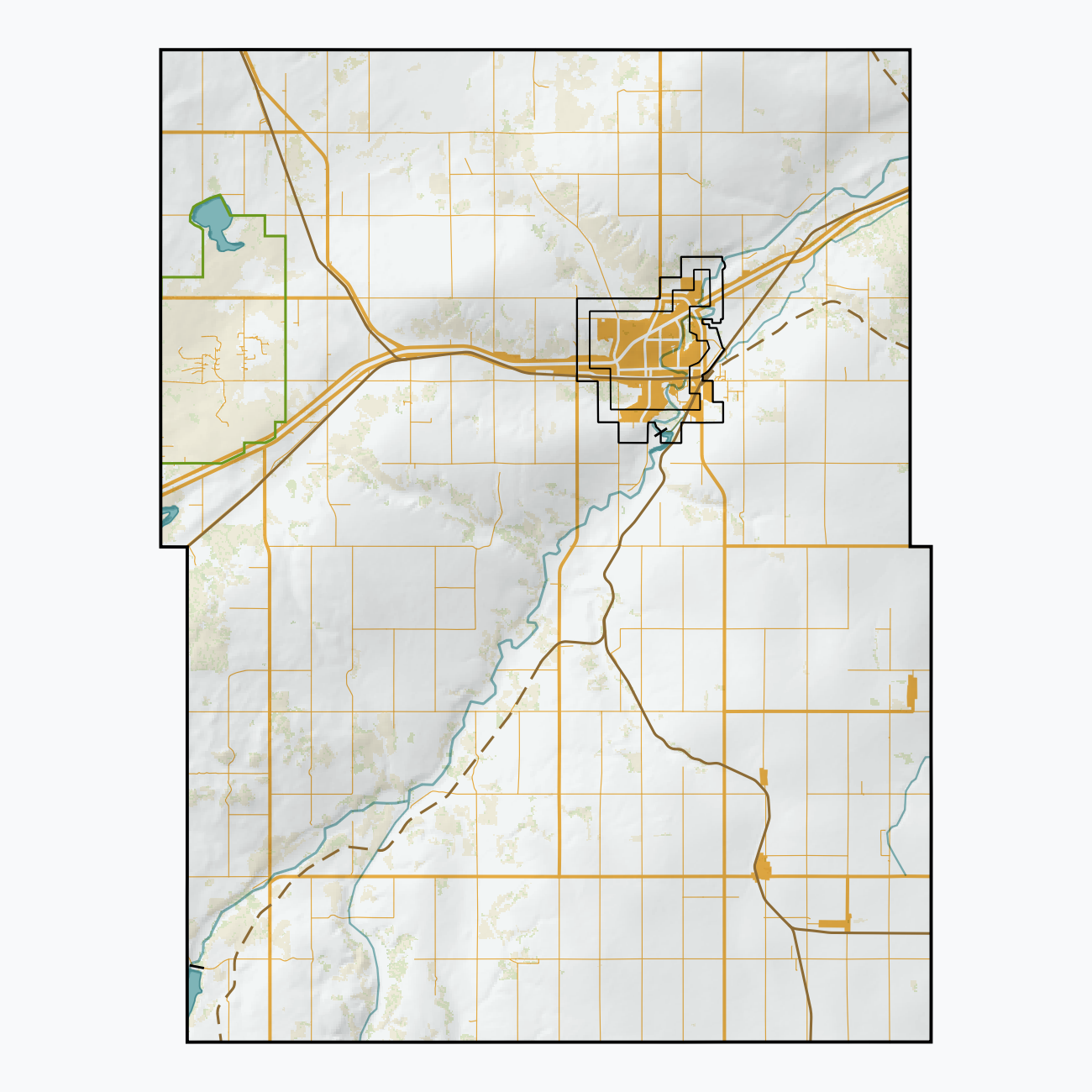

- Location of the RM of Swift Current No. 137 in Saskatchewan
- Coordinates: 50.256°N 107.811°W
- Country: Canada
- Province: Saskatchewan
- SARM division: 3
- Formed: December 12, 1910

Government
  - Reeve: Robert Neufeld
  - Governing body: RM of Swift Current No. 137 Council
  - Administrator: Linda Boser
  - Office location: Swift Current

Area (2016)
  - Land: 1,102.43 km^{2} (425.65 sq mi)

Population (2016)
  - Total: 1,932
  - Density: 1.8/km^{2} (4.7/sq mi)
- Time zone: CST
  - Summer (DST): CST
- Area codes: 306 and 639
- Website: Official website

The Rural Municipality of Swift Current No. 137 (2016 population: 1,932) is a rural municipality (RM) in the Canadian province of Saskatchewan within SARM Division No. 3. Located in the southwest portion of the office, it surrounds the city of Swift Current.

== History ==
The RM of Swift Current No. 137 incorporated as a rural municipality on December 12, 1910.

== Geography ==
=== Communities and localities ===
The following urban municipalities are surrounded by the RM.

Cities

- Swift Current

The following unincorporated communities are within the RM.

Organized hamlets

- Wymark

Localities

- Aikins
- Beverley
- Cantuar
- Duncairn
- Dunelm
- Hak
- Java
- Player
- Rhineland
- Rosengart
- Schantzenfel
- Schoenfeld
- Schoenwiese
- Smith Field Airport
- Springfeld
- Swift Current Airport
- Wyatt

== Demographics ==
Population history (1981–2016)
Year	Pop.	±%
1981	1,827	—
1986	1,801	−1.4%
1991	1,614	−10.4%
1996	1,547	−4.2%
2001	1,706	+10.3%
2006	1,587	−7.0%
2011	2,032	+28.0%
2016	1,932	−4.9%
2021	1,995	+3.3%
Source: Statistics Canada via Saskatchewan Bureau of Statistics

In the 2021 Census of Population conducted by Statistics Canada, the RM of Swift Current No. 137 had a population of 1,995 living in 735 of its 778 total private dwellings, a change of 3.3% from its 2016 population of 1,932. With a land area of 1,100.47 km^{2} (424.89 sq mi), it had a population density of 1.8/km^{2} (4.7/sq mi) in 2021.

In the 2016 Census of Population, the RM of Swift Current No. 137 recorded a population of 1,932 living in 705 of its 743 total private dwellings, a −2.5% change from its 2011 population of 1,981. With a land area of 1,102.43 km^{2} (425.65 sq mi), it had a population density of 1.8/km^{2} (4.5/sq mi) in 2016.

== Government ==
The RM of Swift Current No. 137 is governed by an elected municipal council and an appointed administrator that meets on the second Tuesday of every month. The reeve of the RM is Robert Neufeld while its administrator is Linda Boser. The RM's office is located in Swift Current.

== See also ==
- List of rural municipalities in Saskatchewan
