= Wymark, Saskatchewan =

Hamlet in Saskatchewan, Canada

Wymark
- Organized Hamlet
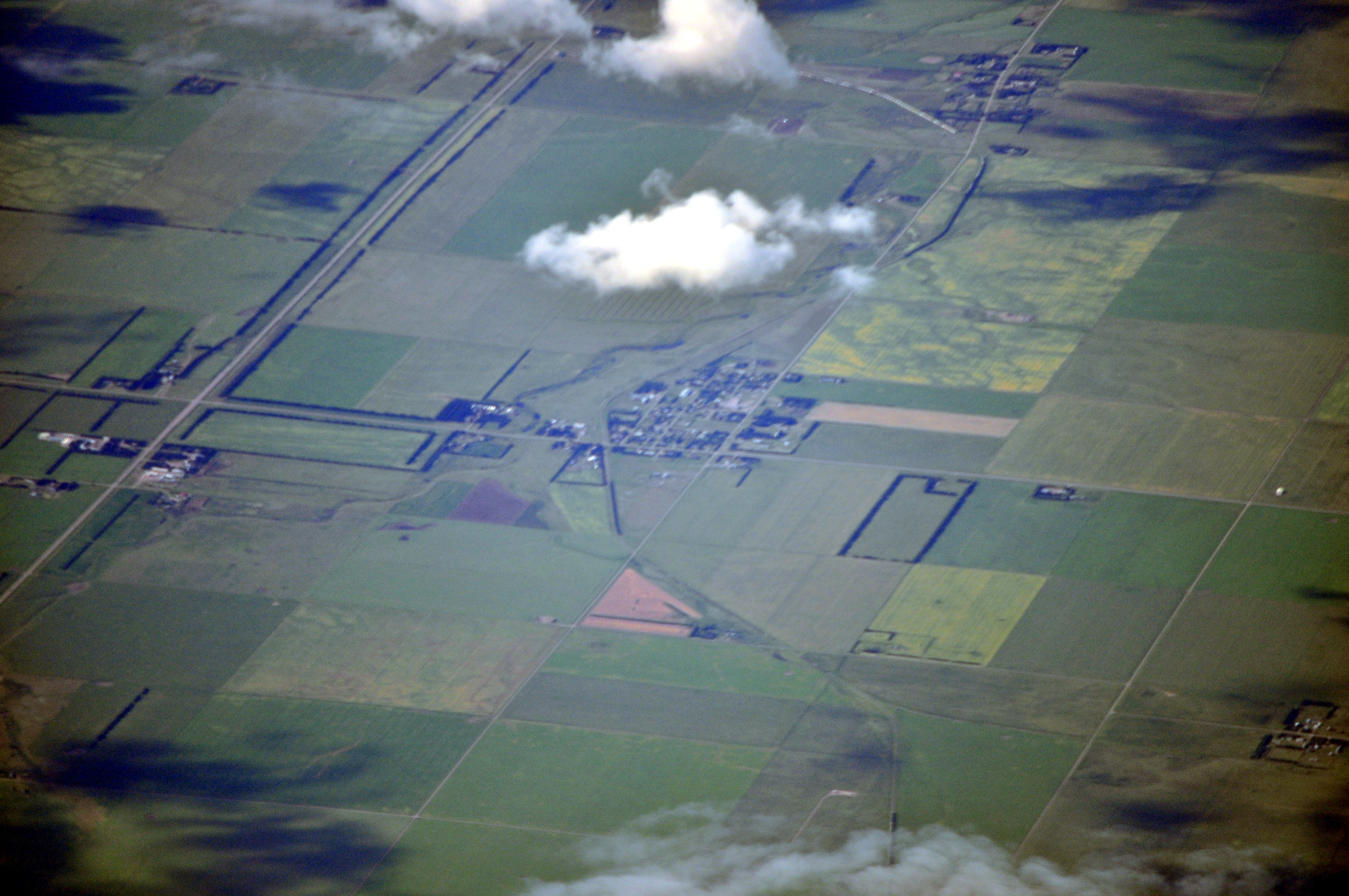
- Aerial view of Wymark (2013) from south by southeast

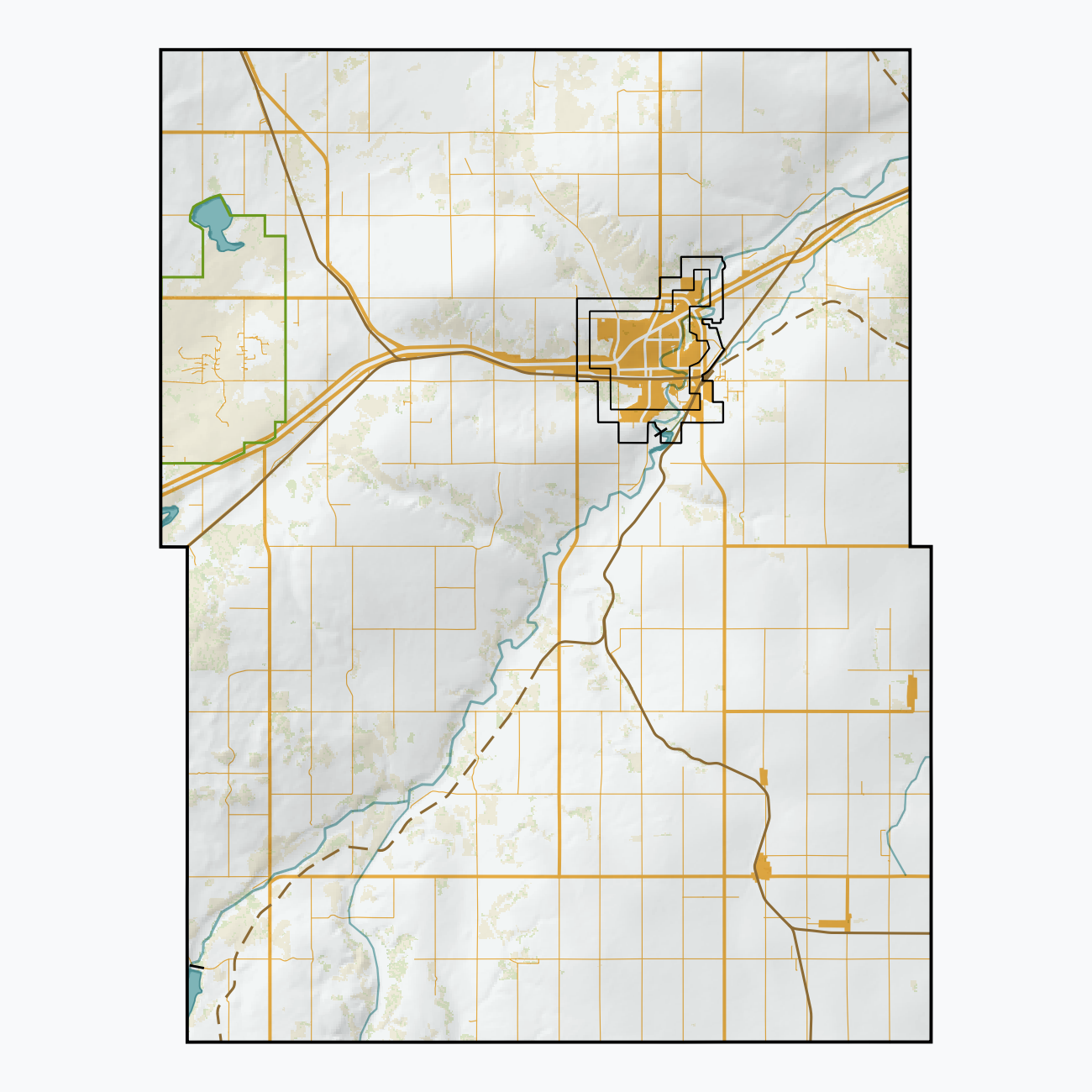
- Location within Swift Current No. 137 Location within Saskatchewan
- Coordinates: 50.1097°N 107.7369°W
- Country: Canada
- Province: Saskatchewan
- Region: Southwest
- Rural municipality: Swift Current No. 137
- Post Office Established: January 1, 1913

Government
  - Reeve: Jerry Knipfel
  - Administrator: Dave Dmytruk
  - Governing body: Swift Current No. 137

Area
  - Total: 0.30 km^{2} (0.12 sq mi)

Population (2011)
  - Total: 130
  - Density: 434.1/km^{2} (1,124/sq mi)
- Time zone: CST
- Postal code: S0N 2Y0
- Area code: 306
- Highways: Highway 379

Wymark is a hamlet in the Rural Municipality of Swift Current No. 137, Saskatchewan, Canada. Listed as a designated place by Statistics Canada, the hamlet had a population of 144 in the Canada 2006 Census, overall down from 200 according to the 1931 census. The hamlet is located on Highway 379 about 2 kilometres (1.2 mi) east of Highway 4, and 15 kilometres (9.3 mi) south of Swift Current.

== Etymology ==
Wymark was named after William Wymark Jacobs, an English writer best known for his 1902 story The Monkey's Paw.

== Demographics ==
In the 2021 Census of Population conducted by Statistics Canada, Wymark had a population of 148 living in 54 of its 57 total private dwellings, a change of 7.2% from its 2016 population of 138. With a land area of 0.32 km^{2} (0.12 sq mi), it had a population density of 462.5/km^{2} (1,197.9/sq mi) in 2021.

== See also ==
- List of communities in Saskatchewan
- List of hamlets in Saskatchewan
