= Merrill Hills =

Community in Saskatchewan, Canada

Coordinates: 52°02′31″N 106°45′56″W

Location of Merrill Hills in Saskatchewan

Merrill Hills is a hamlet in the Rural Municipality of Corman Park No. 344 in Saskatchewan, Canada. It was named for Merrill, Wisconsin.

== See also ==
- List of communities in Saskatchewan
