= Viceroy, Saskatchewan =

Community in Saskatchewan, Canada

Viceroy
- Hamlet
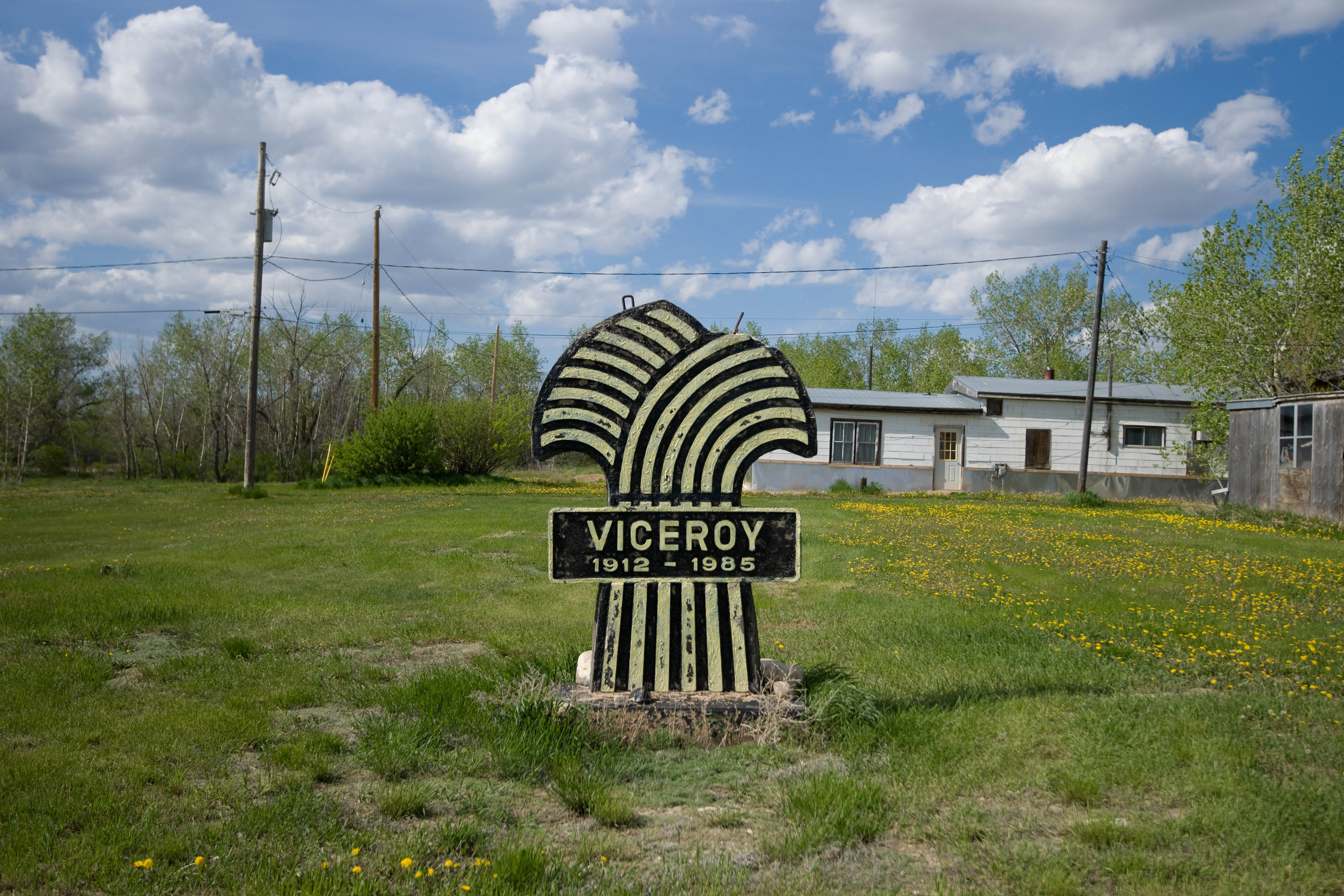
- Viceroy wheat sheaf

- Location within Saskatchewan Location within Canada
- Coordinates: 49°27′37.26″N 105°22′6.01″W
- Country: Canada
- Province: Saskatchewan
- Census division: 3
- Rural municipality: Excel No. 71

Area
  - Total: 1.15 km^{2} (0.44 sq mi)

Population (2006)
  - Total: 30
  - Density: 26/km^{2} (67/sq mi)
- Time zone: CST
- Postal code: S0H 4H0
- Area code: 306

Viceroy is a hamlet in the Rural Municipality of Excel No. 71, Saskatchewan, Canada. The population was 25 at the 2011 Census. The hamlet previously held the status of a village until May 10, 2002. Viceroy is located 7 kilometres (4.3 mi) south of the historic Red Coat Trail on Highway 624 north of Willow Bunch Lake adjacent to Big Muddy Valley.

== History ==
Viceroy was incorporated in 1912. At its peak in the 1950s it had a population of 250. Prior to May 10, 2002, Viceroy was incorporated as a village, and was restructured as a hamlet under the jurisdiction of the Rural municipality of Excel on that date.

== Demographics ==
In the 2021 Census of Population conducted by Statistics Canada, Viceroy had a population of 25 living in 12 of its 19 total private dwellings, a change of 25% from its 2016 population of 20. With a land area of 1.14 km^{2} (0.44 sq mi), it had a population density of 21.9/km^{2} (56.8/sq mi) in 2021.

Canada census – Viceroy, Saskatchewan community profile

	2011
Population	25 (-71.9% from 2006)
Land area	1.18 km^{2} (0.46 sq mi)
Population density	21.3/km^{2} (55/sq mi)
Median age
Private dwellings	18 (total)
Median household income

References: 2011

== Services ==
Once a bustling community with two schools, two restaurants, Klemenz Poolroom and bowling alley, a theatre and many other businesses. After two fires in the past century the community has shrunk to a much smaller scale. Viceroy still has the Viceroy Co-op which, in a sense, is the local "general store" offering grocery staples, tools, feed, hardware, parts, auto repair, and petroleum sales.

The RM of Excel No. 71, office is located on main street with the equipment yard/shop to the south. Bengough Credit Union also operates a branch in Viceroy.

== See also ==
- List of communities in Saskatchewan
- List of hamlets in Saskatchewan
