= Readlyn, Saskatchewan =

Community in Saskatchewan, Canada

Coordinates: 49.58336°N 105.65057°W

Readlyn is a hamlet in the Rural Municipality of Excel No. 71, Saskatchewan, Canada. It previously held the status of a village until December 31, 1955.

== Demographics ==
Prior to December 31, 1955, Readlyn was incorporated as a village, and was restructured as a hamlet under the jurisdiction of the Rural municipality of Excel on that date.

== See also ==
- List of communities in Saskatchewan
- List of hamlets in Saskatchewan
