= Rural Municipality of Excel No. 71 =

Rural municipality in Saskatchewan, Canada

Excel No. 71
- Rural municipality
- Rural Municipality of Excel No. 71
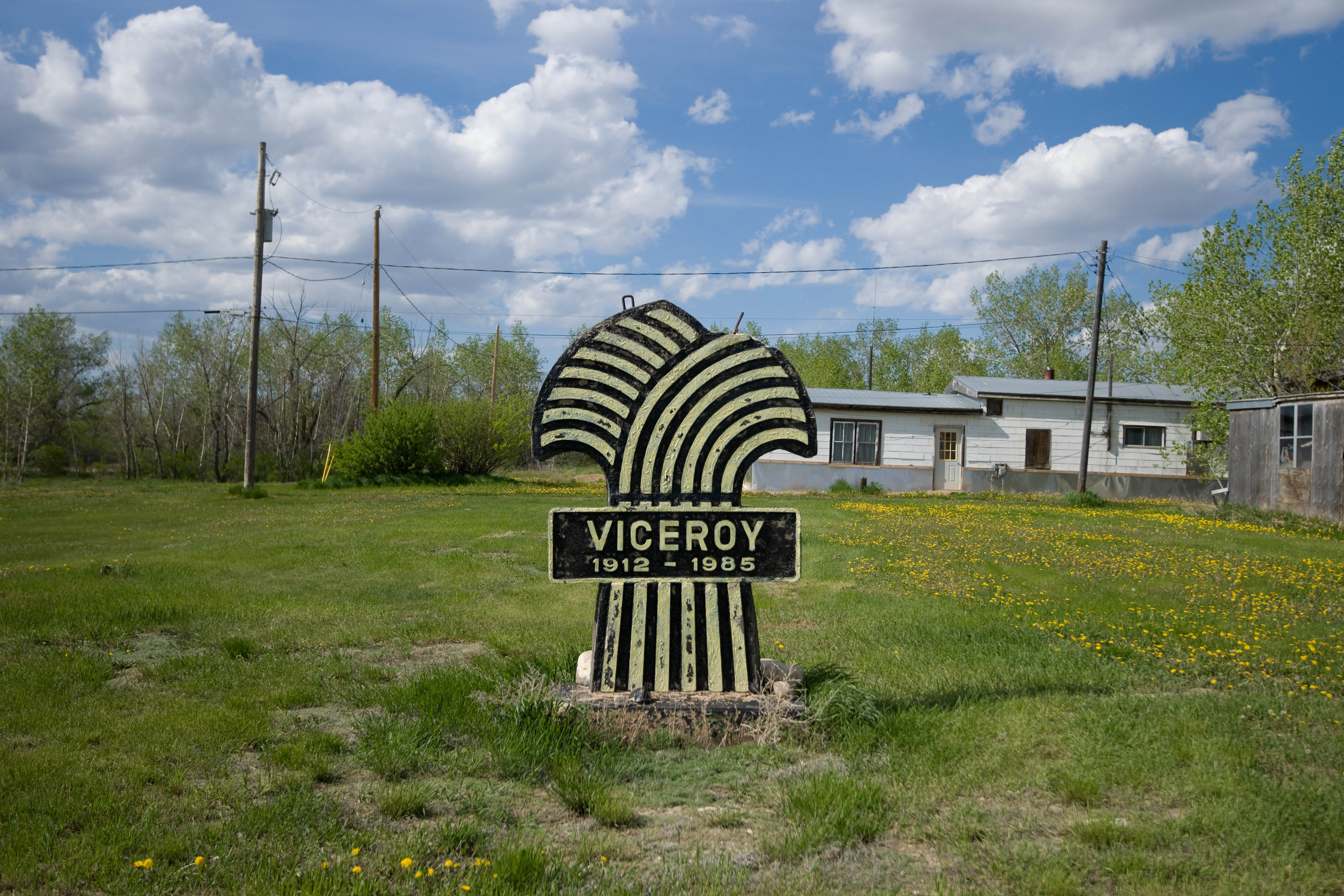
- Wheat stook sign at Viceroy

- Location of the RM of Excel No. 71 in Saskatchewan
- Coordinates: 49.605°N 105.444°W
- Country: Canada
- Province: Saskatchewan
- Census division: 3
- SARM division: 2
- Federal riding: Souris—Moose Mountain
- Provincial riding: Wood River
- Formed: January 1, 1913

Government
  - Reeve: Brock Tendler
  - Governing body: RM of Excel No. 71 Council
  - Administrator: Jan McDonald
  - Office location: Viceroy

Area (2016)
  - Land: 1,122.02 km^{2} (433.21 sq mi)

Population (2016)
  - Total: 391
  - Density: 0.3/km^{2} (0.78/sq mi)
- Time zone: CST
  - Summer (DST): CST
- Postal code: S0H 4H0
- Area codes: 306 and 639

The Rural Municipality of Excel No. 71 (2016 population: 391) is a rural municipality (RM) in the Canadian province of Saskatchewan within Census Division No. 3 and SARM Division No. 2. It is located in the south-central portion of the province.

== History ==
The RM of Excel No. 71 incorporated as a rural municipality on January 1, 1913.

== Geography ==
=== Communities and localities ===
The following unincorporated communities are within the RM.

Organized hamlets

- Ormiston

Localities

- Crane Valley
- Maxwellton
- Readlyn, dissolved as a village, December 31, 1955
- Verwood, dissolved as a village, December 31, 1954
- Viceroy, dissolved as a village, May 10, 2002

== Dryboro/ Burn Lake IBA ==
Dryboro/ Burn Lake (SK 029) is an Important Bird Area (IBA) of Canada within the RM of Excel. The IBA is located 5 kilometres (3.1 mi) west of Ormiston and covers an area of 25.62 km^{2} (9.89 sq mi) in the Missouri Coteau region. Dryboro and Burn Lakes are part of a larger complex of connected intermittent salt lakes in a semi-arid landscape surrounded by hilly terrain that is part of a federal Prairie Farm Rehabilitation Administration. The lakes are an important habitat for the endangered piping plover and are protected from development up to the high water mark. Other birds found in the area include the Baird's sparrow, Sprague's pipit, chestnut-collared longspur, clay-coloured sparrow, and the horned lark.

== Demographics ==
Population history (1981–2016)
Year	Pop.	±%
1981	838	—
1986	710	−15.3%
1991	630	−11.3%
1996	563	−10.6%
2001	482	−14.4%
2006	466	−3.3%
2011	427	−8.4%
2016	391	−8.4%
Source: Statistics Canada via Saskatchewan Bureau of Statistics

In the 2021 Census of Population conducted by Statistics Canada, the RM of Excel No. 71 had a population of 411 living in 129 of its 169 total private dwellings, a change of 5.1% from its 2016 population of 391. With a land area of 1,093.31 km^{2} (422.13 sq mi), it had a population density of 0.4/km^{2} (1.0/sq mi) in 2021.

In the 2016 Census of Population, the RM of Excel No. 71 recorded a population of 391 living in 124 of its 177 total private dwellings, a −8.4% change from its 2011 population of 427. With a land area of 1,122.02 km^{2} (433.21 sq mi), it had a population density of 0.3/km^{2} (0.9/sq mi) in 2016.

== Government ==
The RM of Excel No. 71 is governed by an elected municipal council and an appointed administrator that meets on the first Tuesday of every month. The reeve of the RM is Arnold Montgomery while its administrator is Jan McDonald. The RM's office is located in Viceroy.

== Transportation ==
The Red Coat & Rail Ltd. operates a short-line railway through the rural municipality. It is primarily used for the transport of agricultural products.
