= River's Edge, Saskatchewan =

River's Edge River's Edge Estates
- Organized hamlet
- Location of River's Edge in Saskatchewan River's Edge (Canada)
- Coordinates: 52.220°N 106.553°W
- Country: Canada
- Province: Saskatchewan
- Census division: 11
- Rural municipality (RM): Corman Park No. 344

Government
  - Hamlet board chair: Cindy Moleski
- Time zone: CST
- Area code: 306
- Waterways: South Saskatchewan River

River's Edge or River's Edge Estates is an organized hamlet within the Rural Municipality (RM) of Corman Park No. 344 in the Canadian province of Saskatchewan. It is on the southeast shore of the South Saskatchewan River approximately 12 km (7.5 mi) northeast of downtown Saskatoon.

== Government ==
While River's Edge is under the jurisdiction of the RM of Corman Park No. 344, it has a three-person hamlet board that is chaired by Cindy Moleski.
