= Riverside Estates, Saskatchewan =

Community in Saskatchewan, Canada

Coordinates: 52°02′00″N 106°42′20″W

Location of Riverside Estates in Saskatchewan

Riverside Estates is a hamlet in the Rural Municipality of Corman Park No. 344 in Saskatchewan, Canada. It is approximately 3.5 kilometres (2.2 mi) south of the city of Saskatoon.

Riverside Estates was declared an organized hamlet on April 5, 1992. At the request of its residents, it was reverted to hamlet status on January 1, 1999.

== See also ==
- List of communities in Saskatchewan
