= Casa Rio, Saskatchewan =

Community in Saskatchewan, Canada

Casa Rio
- Organized Hamlet of Casa Rio
- Location of Casa Rio in Saskatchewan Casa Rio (Canada)
- Coordinates: 51.979°N 106.390°W
- Country: Canada
- Province: Saskatchewan
- Region: Central
- Census division: 11
- Rural municipality: Corman Park No. 344
- Time zone: CST
- Area code: 306
- Highways: Highway 11; Highway 219

Casa Rio is an organized hamlet in Saskatchewan, Canada. The hamlet, which is just south of Saskatoon, was formally established on May 21, 2002. Access from the west is from Highway 219 and from the east is Highway 11.

According to Environics Analytics, it was one of the five wealthiest neighbourhoods in Saskatchewan in 2013.

== See also ==
- List of communities in Saskatchewan
- List of hamlets in Saskatchewan
