= Cathedral Bluffs =

Hamlet in Saskatchewan, Canada

Coordinates: 52.144°N 106.312°W

Location of Cathedral Bluffs in Saskatchewan

Cathedral Bluffs is a hamlet in the Canadian province of Saskatchewan. It is on the banks of the South Saskatchewan River within the Rural Municipality of Corman Park No. 344.

Provincially, it is represented in the Martensville-Blairmore constituency by Member of the Legislative Assembly of Saskatchewan, Jamie Martens of the Saskatchewan Party. Federally, it is represented in the Carlton Trail—Eagle Creek riding by its Member of Parliament, Kelly Block of the Conservative Party of Canada.

== See also ==
- List of communities in Saskatchewan
