= Beaver Creek, Saskatchewan =

Community in Saskatchewan, Canada

Beaver Creek
- Organized hamlet
- Location within Saskatchewan Location within Canada
- Coordinates: 51°58′35″N 106°39′53″W
- Country: Canada
- Province: Saskatchewan
- Region: West-central
- Census division: 11
- Rural municipality: Dundurn No. 314

Government
  - Governing body: Beaver Creek Council

Area
  - Land: 2.00 km^{2} (0.77 sq mi)

Population (2016)
  - Total: 107
  - Density: 53.5/km^{2} (139/sq mi)
- Time zone: CST
- Area code: 306
- Highways: Highway 219

Beaver Creek is a hamlet in the Rural Municipality of Dundurn No. 314, Saskatchewan, Canada. Listed as a designated place by Statistics Canada, the hamlet had a population of 107 in the Canada 2016 Census. It was named after the near-by Beaver Creek Conservation Area.

== Demographics ==
In the 2021 Census of Population conducted by Statistics Canada, Beaver Creek had a population of 111 living in 42 of its 42 total private dwellings, a change of 3.7% from its 2016 population of 107. With a land area of 2.05 km^{2} (0.79 sq mi), it had a population density of 54.1/km^{2} (140.2/sq mi) in 2021.

Canada census – Beaver Creek community profile

	2021	2016
Population	78 (-16.1% from 2016)	107 (- 2.7% from 2011)
Land area	26.66 km^{2} (10.29 sq mi)	2.00 km^{2} (0.77 sq mi)
Population density	2.9/km^{2} (7.5/sq mi)	53.3/km^{2} (138/sq mi)
Median age	42.8 (M: 42.8, F: 42.0)	56.8 (M: 56.8, F: 56.8)
Private dwellings	61 (total) 40 (occupied)	45 (total)
Median household income		$N/A

References: 2021 2016

== See also ==
- List of communities in Saskatchewan
- List of hamlets in Saskatchewan
- Beaver Creek Conservation Area
- Designated place
