= Snowden, Saskatchewan =

Coordinates: 53°29′28″N 104°40′43″W

Snowden is a designated place in Saskatchewan.

The CPR bought the land for the townsite in 1930. The first postmaster, Robert English, chose the name Snowden, apparently in memory of a friend who drowned while working on the Nipawin ferry. After the construction of the bridge near Nipawin and the beginning of regular rail service in 1932 the town began to grow rapidly. In 1935 the Star Hotel and a school opened in the community. Snowden's one elevator was built in 1938. By 1940 Snowden had four churches, Pentecostal, Lutheran, Catholic and United. The school would grow to three rooms, housing Grades 1 to 10.

The main industry was originally logging. As the land was cleared it became farming. Many people came to the area because of the drought in southern Saskatchewan. The town's population was 100 in 1966. As farms became larger, Snowden's population and services slowly began to decline. The elevator was closed in 1975, the rail line abandoned in 1992.

A picture of the original hotel (which is still in the bar) shows a moderately-sized two-storey building with a second-storey balcony. At some point the first floor of the hotel received an addition. It reopened as a restaurant and lounge in 2013. There is a video being made to celebrate the 85th Anniversary of the hotel. Information can be found on Snowden Star Hotel Facebook page.

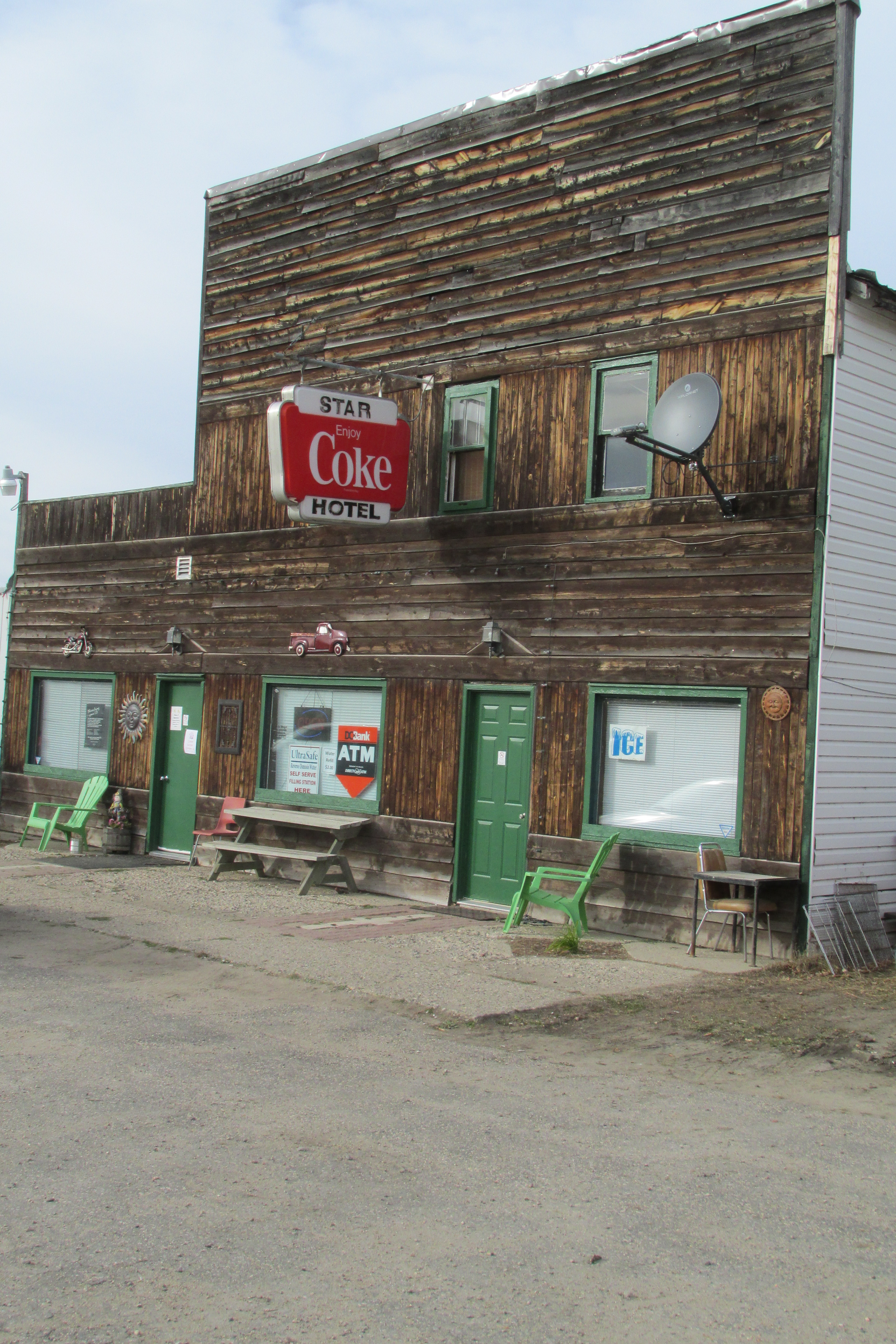
The hotel and restaurant has been reopened in Snowden

== Demographics ==
In the 2021 Census of Population conducted by Statistics Canada, Snowden had a population of 15 living in 10 of its 13 total private dwellings, a change of -25% from its 2016 population of 20. With a land area of 0.1 km^{2} (0.039 sq mi), it had a population density of 150.0/km^{2} (388.5/sq mi) in 2021.
