= Neuhorst =

Community in Saskatchewan, Canada

Coordinates: 52°24′05″N 106°34′35″W

Neuhorst is a small hamlet in Saskatchewan, Canada about 30 minutes north of Saskatoon. Neuhorst is a part of the Rural Municipality of Corman Park No. 344 and is located near Highway 305.

== Demographics ==
In the 2021 Census of Population conducted by Statistics Canada, Neuhorst had a population of 89 living in 36 of its 39 total private dwellings, a change of −21.9% from its 2016 population of 114. With a land area of 0.3 km^{2} (0.12 sq mi), it had a population density of 296.7/km^{2} (768.4/sq mi) in 2021.

== See also ==
- List of communities in Saskatchewan
