= Discovery Ridge, Saskatchewan =

Community in Saskatchewan, Canada

Discovery Ridge
- Organized hamlet
- Location of Discovery Ridge in Saskatchewan Discovery Ridge (Canada)
- Coordinates: 52.220°N 106.553°W
- Country: Canada
- Province: Saskatchewan
- Census division: 11
- Rural municipality (RM): Corman Park No. 344

Government
  - Hamlet board chair: Ed Underwood
- Time zone: CST
- Area code: 306
- Highways: Highway 5

Discovery Ridge is an organized hamlet within the Rural Municipality of Corman Park No. 344 in the Canadian province of Saskatchewan. It is on the north side of Highway 5, approximately 16 kilometres (9.9 mi) east of downtown Saskatoon.

== Government ==
While Discovery Ridge is under the jurisdiction of the RM of Corman Park No. 344, it has a three-person hamlet board that is chaired by Ed Underwood.

== See also ==
- List of communities in Saskatchewan
