= Cabri Lake =

Lake in Saskatchewan, Canada

- Location in Saskatchewan Cabri Lake (Canada)
- Location: Saskatchewan
- Coordinates: 51°06′N 109°44′W
- Type: Salt lake
- Part of: Saskatchewan River drainage basin
- Primary outflows: None
- Basin countries: Canada
- Surface area: 865.6 ha (2,139 acres)
- Surface elevation: 588 m (1,929 ft)
- Settlements: None

Cabri Lake is an endorheic, salt lake in the Canadian province of Saskatchewan. It is in the south-west region of the province near the border with Alberta in the Rural Municipality of Chesterfield No. 261. Cabri Lake is in the semi-arid Palliser's Triangle and can completely dry up during drought years.

Cabri Lake is within the Mantario Hills (SK 047) Important Bird Area (IBA) of Canada, which is a significant staging area for Canadian geese and nesting area for the ferruginous hawk.

== Cabri Lake Effigy ==
Cabri Lake is of archeological significance as its shore is the site of the Cabri Lake Effigy – also known as Cabri Lake Stone Man – boulder monument that is believed to represent a shaman. Tours of the lake and Cabri Hills archeological site are organized by the Archaeological & Historical Society of West-Central Saskatchewan.

== See also ==
- List of lakes of Saskatchewan
