= Rural Municipality of Chesterfield No. 261 =

Rural municipality in Saskatchewan, Canada

Chesterfield No. 261
- Rural municipality
- Rural Municipality of Chesterfield No. 261

- Location of the RM of Chesterfield No. 261 in Saskatchewan
- Coordinates: 51.017°N 109.663°W
- Country: Canada
- Province: Saskatchewan
- Census division: 8
- SARM division: 3
- Formed: December 9, 1912

Government
  - Reeve: William Thomson
  - Governing body: RM of Chesterfield No. 261 Council
  - Administrator: Tosha Kozicki
  - Office location: Eatonia

Area (2016)
  - Land: 1,943.29 km^{2} (750.31 sq mi)

Population (2016)
  - Total: 481
  - Density: 0.2/km^{2} (0.52/sq mi)
- Time zone: CST
  - Summer (DST): CST
- Area codes: 306 and 639
- Highway(s): Highway 21; Highway 44; Highway 635
- Waterway(s): Red Deer River; South Saskatchewan River

The Rural Municipality of Chesterfield No. 261 (2016 population: 481) is a rural municipality (RM) in the Canadian province of Saskatchewan within Census Division No. 8 and SARM Division No. 3.

== History ==
The RM of Chesterfield No. 261 incorporated as a rural municipality on December 9, 1912.

== Geography ==
The southern boundary of the RM is along the South Saskatchewan River. The largest lake is Cabri Lake and the Mantario Hills are found in the western part of the RM. Within the hills is the Mantario Hills (SK 047) Important Bird Area (IBA) of Canada, which is a significant staging area for Canadian geese and nesting area for the ferruginous hawk. The Mantario Wildlife Management Unit is also found within the hills.

=== Communities and localities ===
The following urban municipalities are surrounded by the RM.

Towns

- Eatonia

Villages

The following unincorporated communities are within the RM.

Organized hamlets

- Mantario
- Laporte

Localities

- Cuthbert
- Eyre

== Demographics ==
Population history (1981–2016)
Year	Pop.	±%
1981	656	—
1986	638	−2.7%
1991	646	+1.3%
1996	598	−7.4%
2001	532	−11.0%
2006	475	−10.7%
2011	480	+1.1%
2016	481	+0.2%
Source: Statistics Canada via Saskatchewan Bureau of Statistics

In the 2021 Census of Population conducted by Statistics Canada, the RM of Chesterfield No. 261 had a population of 419 living in 142 of its 171 total private dwellings, a change of −12.9% from its 2016 population of 481. With a land area of 1,962.21 km^{2} (757.61 sq mi), it had a population density of 0.2/km^{2} (0.6/sq mi) in 2021.

In the 2016 Census of Population, the RM of Chesterfield No. 261 recorded a population of 481 living in 147 of its 165 total private dwellings, a 0.2% change from its 2011 population of 480. With a land area of 1,943.29 km^{2} (750.31 sq mi), it had a population density of 0.2/km^{2} (0.6/sq mi) in 2016.

== Attractions ==
- Cabri Lake Effigy

== Government ==
The RM of Chesterfield No. 261 is governed by an elected municipal council and an appointed administrator that meets on the second Tuesday of every month.

== Transportation ==
- Canadian National Railway
- Saskatchewan Highway 21
- Saskatchewan Highway 44
- Saskatchewan Highway 635
- Estuary Ferry

== See also ==
- List of rural municipalities in Saskatchewan
