= Le Cabri =

The Le Cabri was a French automobile manufactured from 1924 to 1925. The builder, Marcel Cabon, born in 1905 Neuilly, Haut de Seine France, was nineteen years old. A cyclecar with a side valve 980cc Ruby engine, 4 cylinders monobloc,5 hp, 475 kg. It was built in Chevreuse Seine & Oise France. Few were constructed before the company folded.

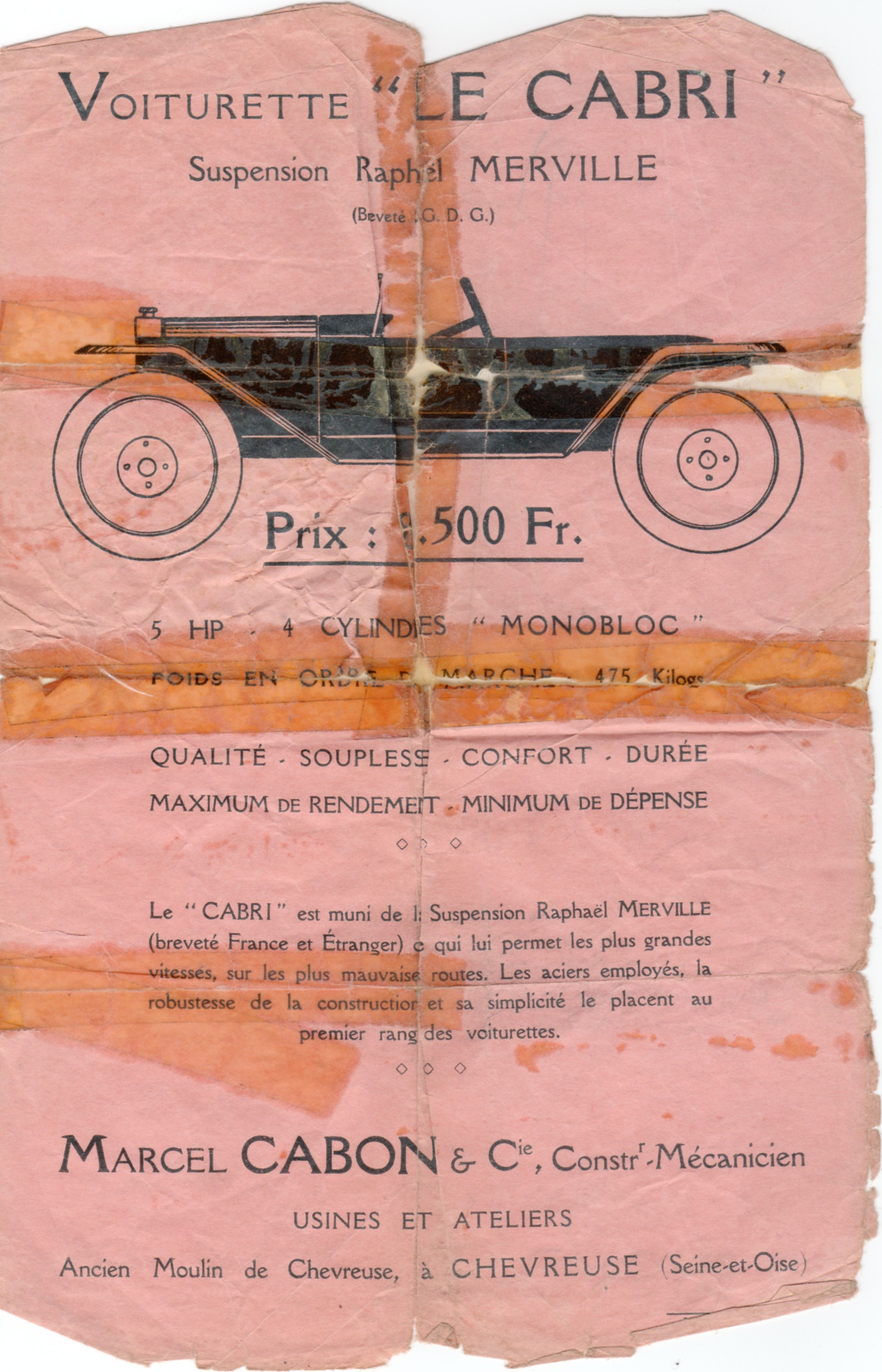
Flyer Le Cabri 1924/25

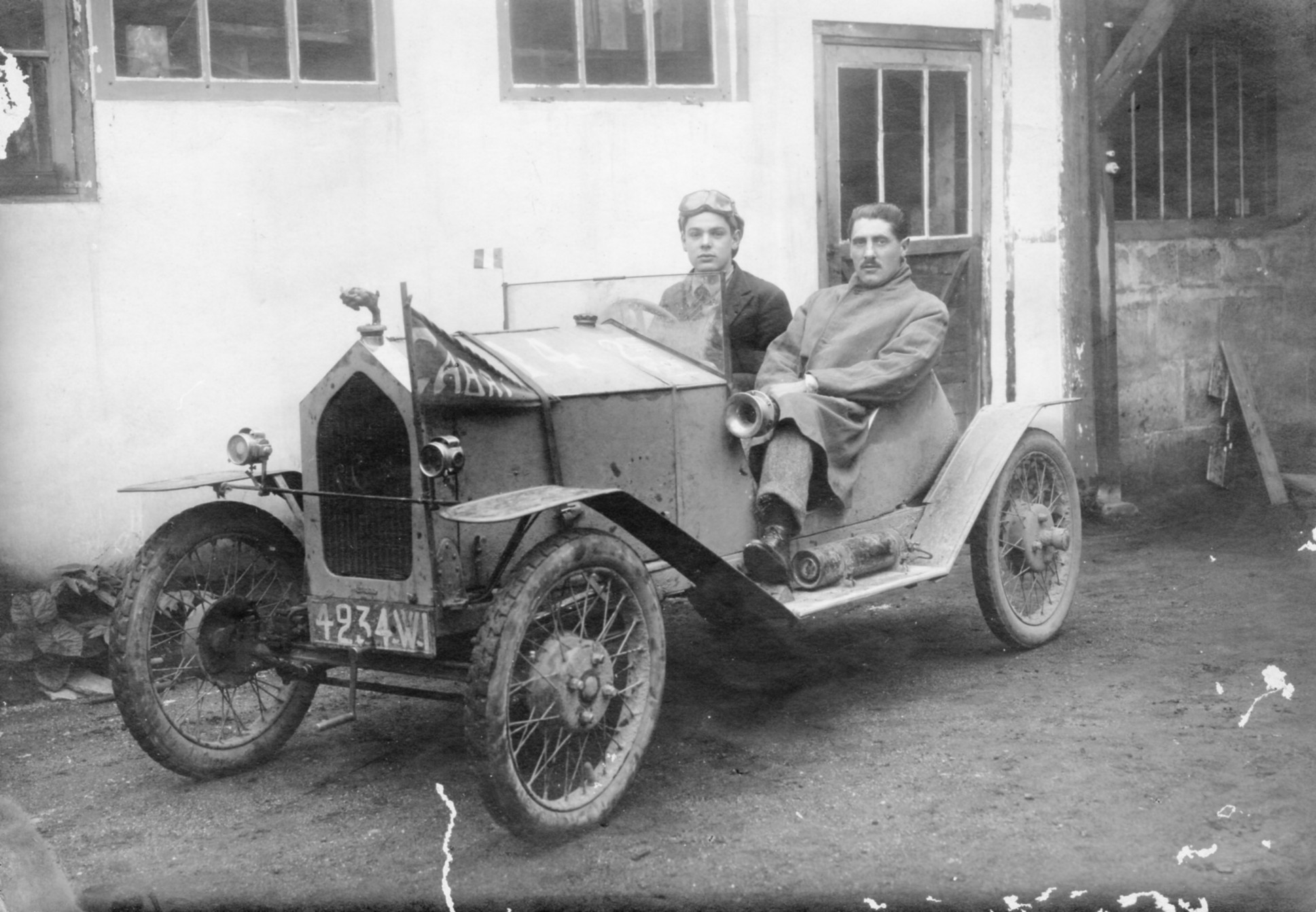
Marcel Cabon driving Le Cabri

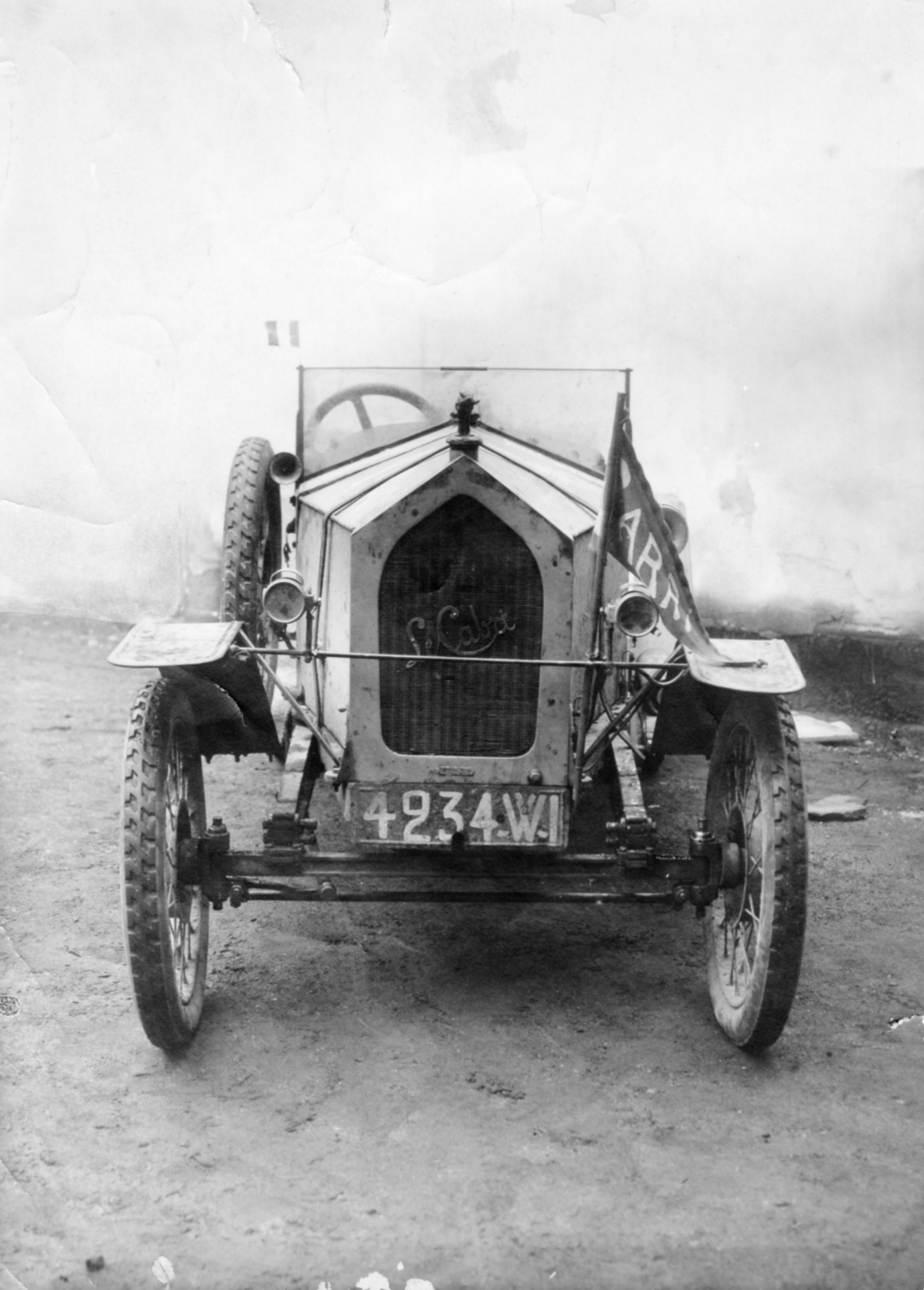
Le Cabri front

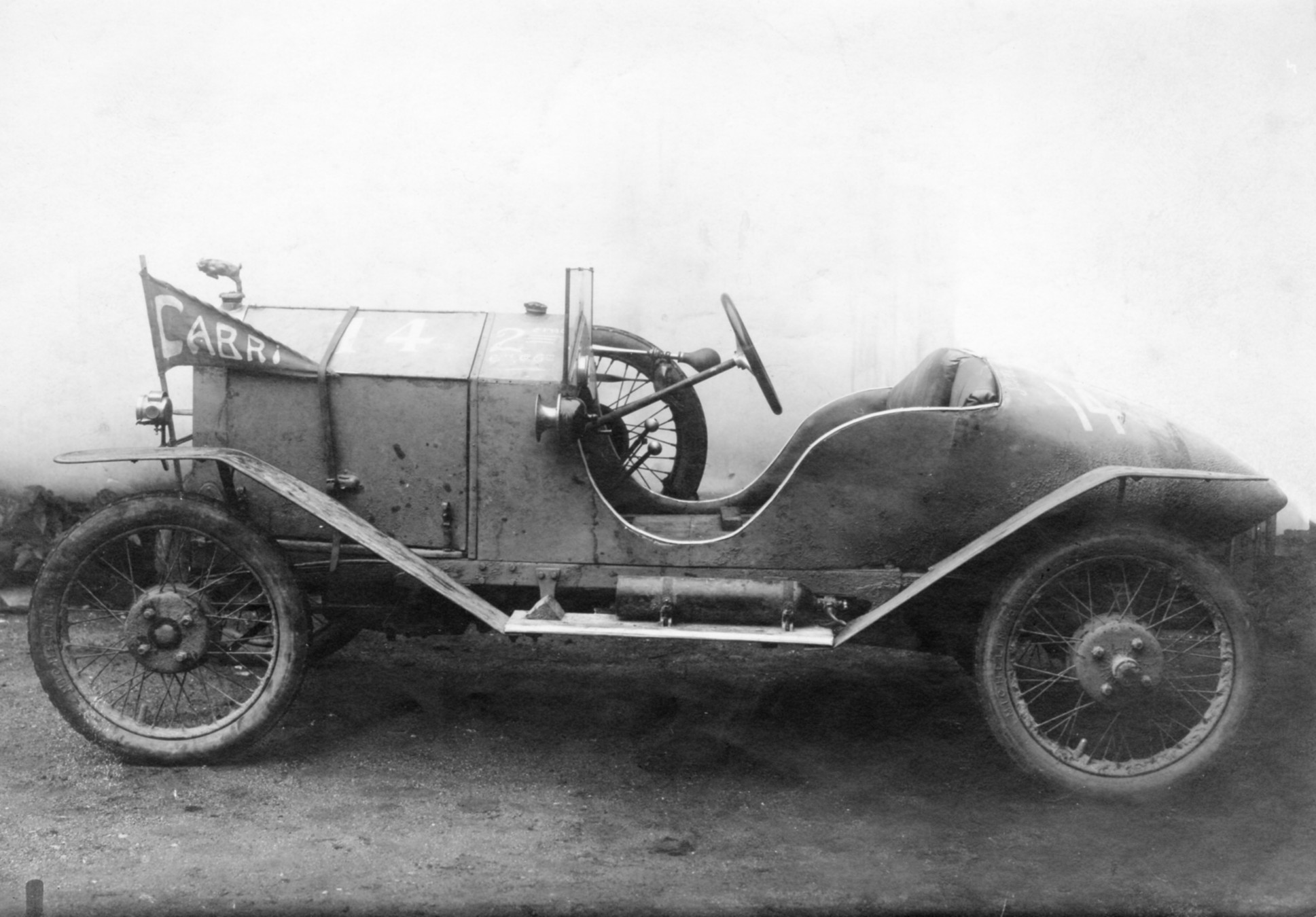
Le Cabri left side

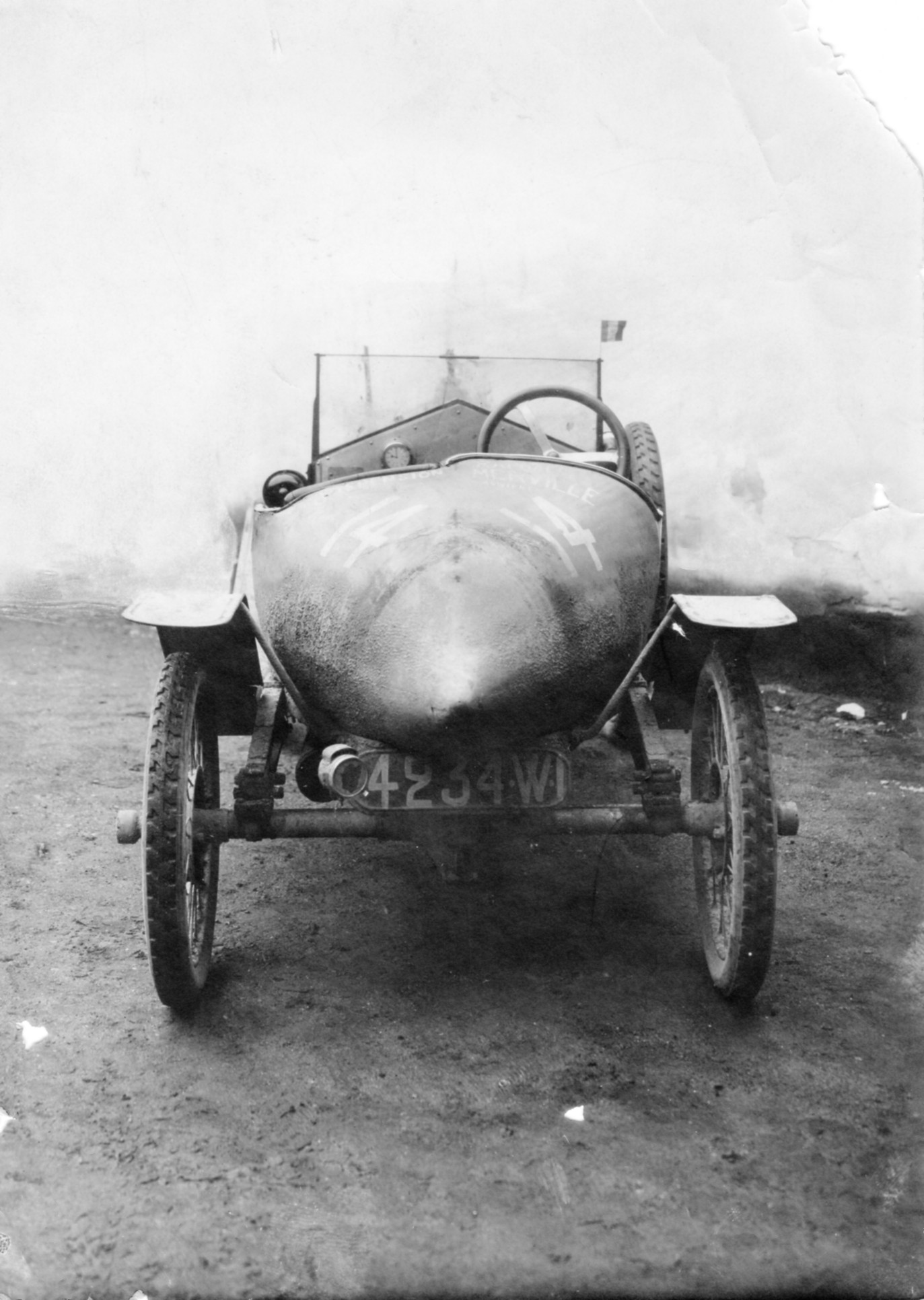
Le Cabri rear
