= Cedar Villa Estates =

Community in Saskatchewan, Canada

Coordinates: 52°05′47″N 106°46′18″W

Cedar Villa Estates is a hamlet in the Canadian province of Saskatchewan, located southwest of Saskatoon. It is within the Rural Municipality of Corman Park No. 344.

== Demographics ==
In the 2021 Census of Population conducted by Statistics Canada, Cedar Villa Estates had a population of 113 living in 38 of its 39 total private dwellings, a change of 8.7% from its 2016 population of 104. With a land area of 0.68 km^{2} (0.26 sq mi), it had a population density of 166.2/km^{2} (430.4/sq mi) in 2021.

== See also ==
- List of communities in Saskatchewan
