= Shipman, Saskatchewan =

Hamlet in Saskatchewan, Canada

Coordinates: 53°28′35″N 104°59′00″W

Shipman is a hamlet in the Canadian province of Saskatchewan.

The Shipman post office opened in 1933. Its school district was organized in 1934, a school was built which opened in 1934. The original industry was a saw mill that cut timber into cordwood which was loaded into boxcars at the community. As the land was cleared farming became the main industry. A grain elevator was built in 1935.

Shipman had a number of serious fires, burning businesses including "three grocery stores, a restaurant, service station, poolroom, the community hall, grain elevator and annex."

In 1975 the school was closed, the elevator in 1981, and the rail line was abandoned in the early 1990s.

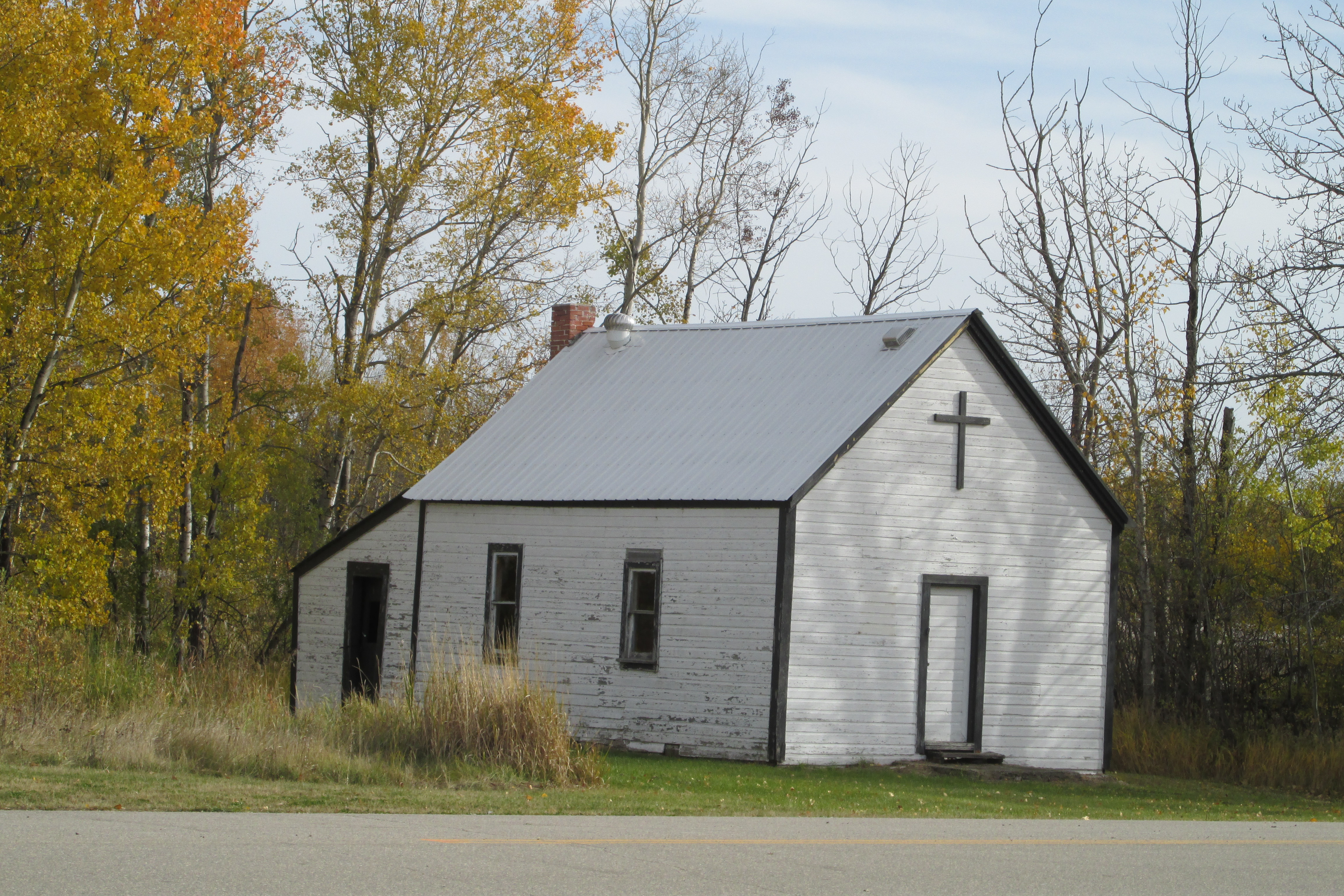
The church is maintained

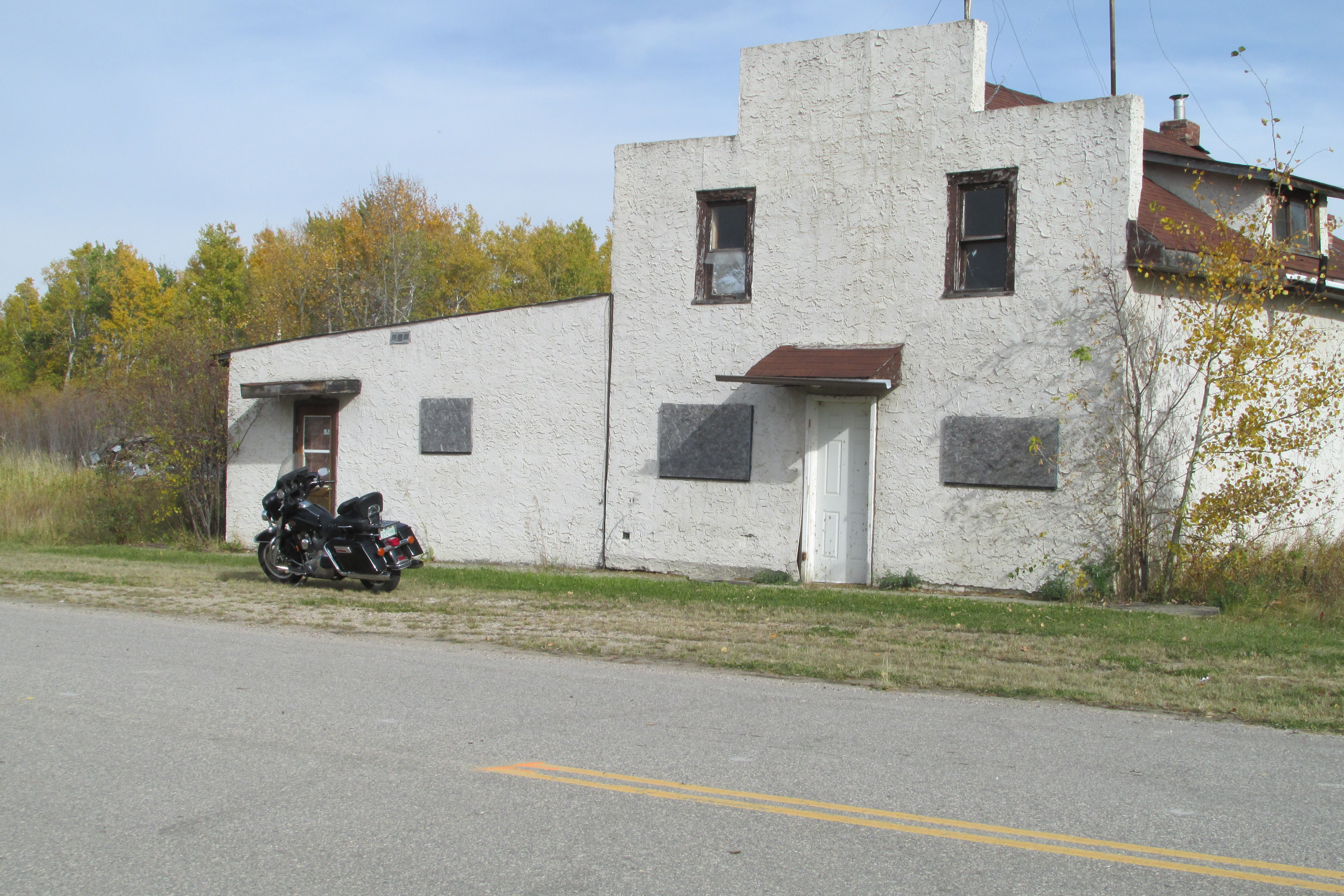
The hotel has been vacant for some time.

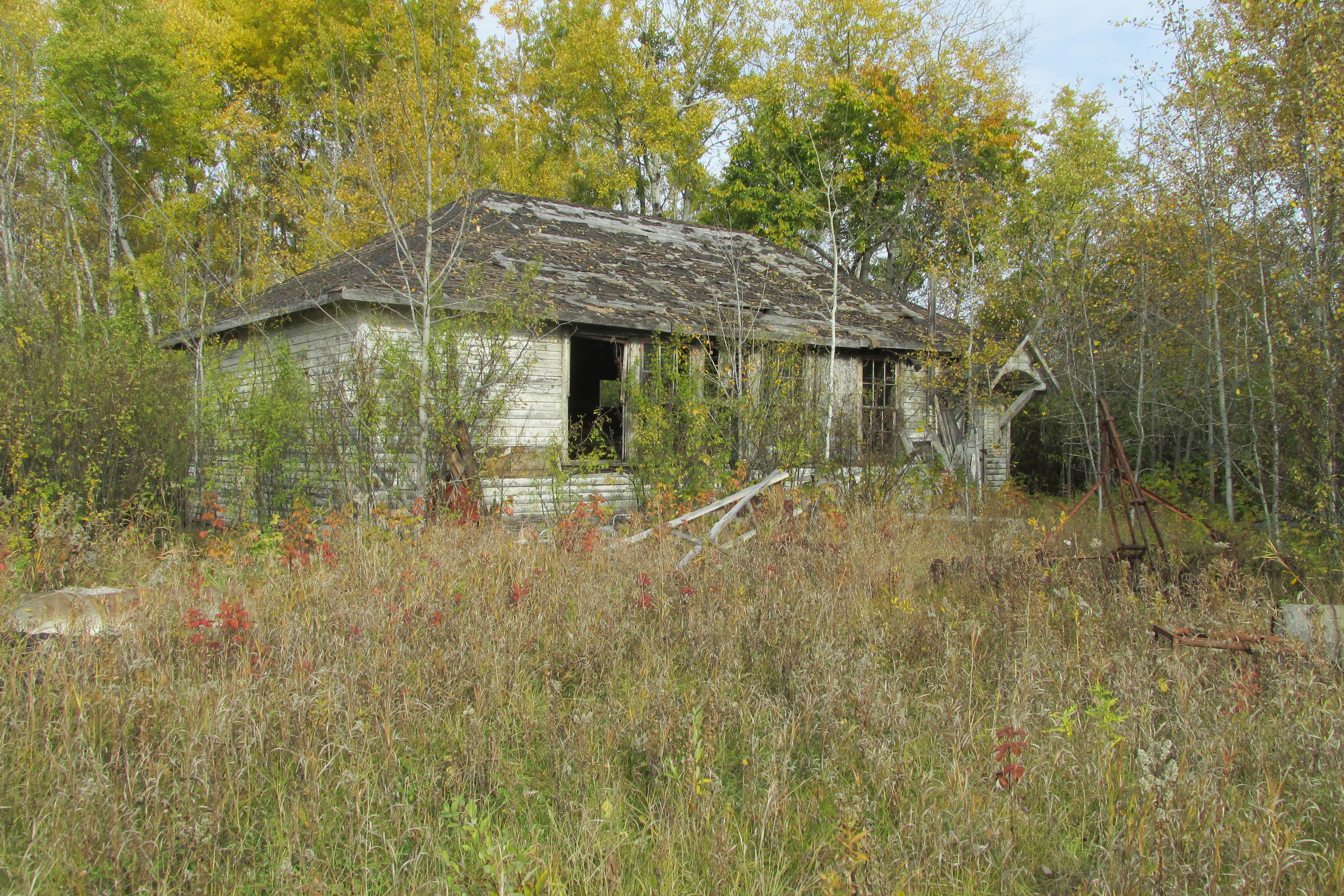
The school is in disrepair

== Demographics ==
In the 2021 Census of Population conducted by Statistics Canada, Shipman had a population of 5 living in 3 of its 4 total private dwellings, a change of -50% from its 2016 population of 10. With a land area of 0.37 km^{2} (0.14 sq mi), it had a population density of 13.5/km^{2} (35.0/sq mi) in 2021.
