= Eagle Ridge Country Estates =

Community in Saskatchewan, Canada

- Organized Hamlet
- Location of Eagle Ridge Eagle Ridge Country Estates (Canada)
- Coordinates: 52°09′43″N 106°29′09″W
- Country: Canada
- Province: Saskatchewan
- Region: Central
- Rural municipality: Corman Park No. 344
- Organized as a Hamlet: April 30, 2004
- Time zone: CST
- Area code: 306

Eagle Ridge Country Estates is an organized hamlet in the Rural Municipality of Corman Park No. 344 near the city of Saskatoon, Saskatchewan, Canada. The hamlet consists of 26 estates.

== See also ==
- List of communities in Saskatchewan
