= Alsask =

Community in Saskatchewan, Canada

- Special service area
- Special Service Area of Alsask
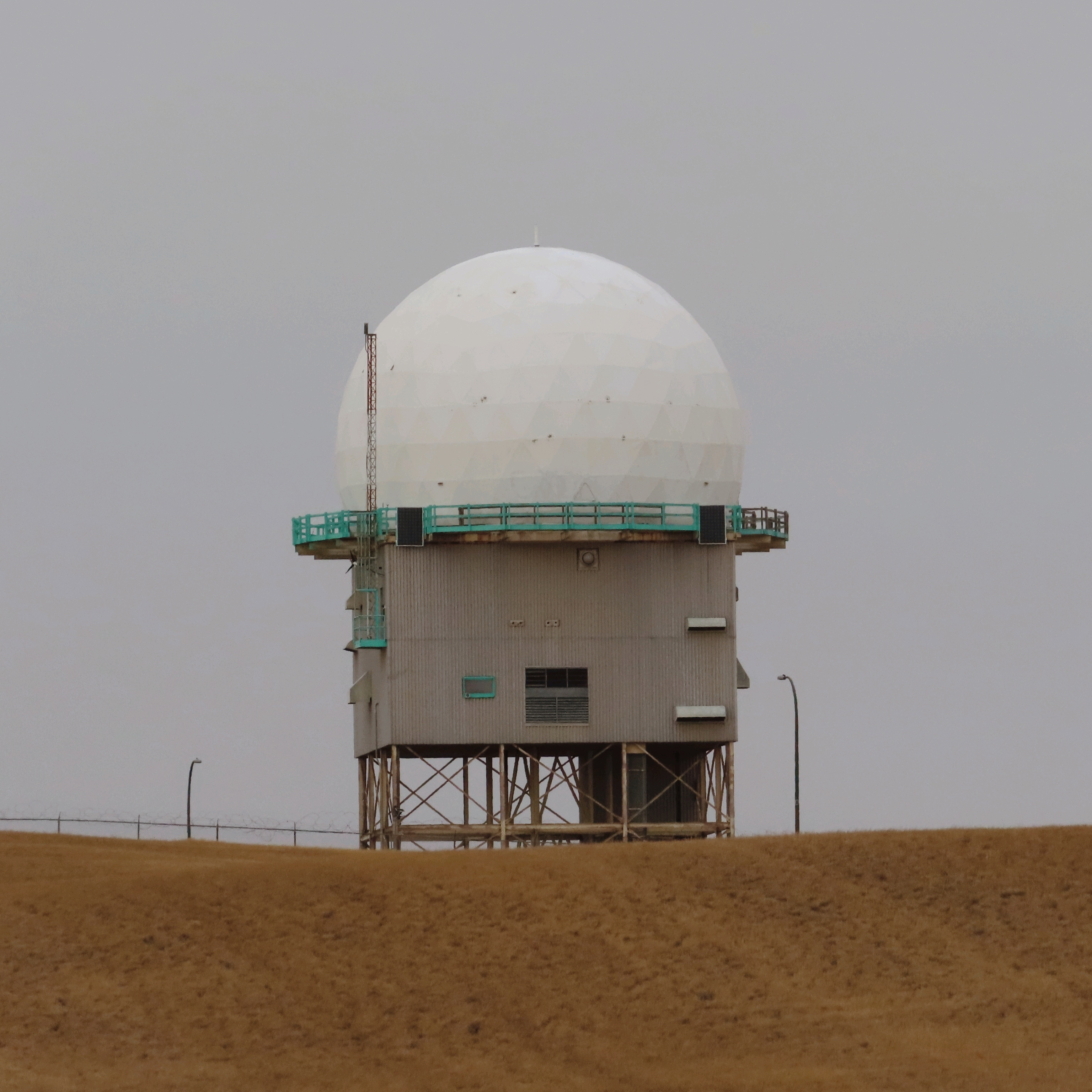
- The Alsask radome is visible for kilometres in every direction and owned by the Canadian Civil Defence Museum

- Location within Milton No. 292 Location within Saskatchewan
- Coordinates: 51°22′47″N 109°59′49″W
- Country: Canada
- Province: Saskatchewan
- Region: West-Central
- Rural Municipality: Milton No. 292
- Post office established: January 1, 1911
- Incorporated (village): November 22, 1910
- Incorporated (town): November 1, 1912
- Restructured (special service area): January 1, 1947 (village); July 30, 2009 (SSA)

Government
  - Governing body: Milton No. 292

Area
  - Total: 1.87 km^{2} (0.72 sq mi)

Population (2021)
  - Total: 113
  - Density: 60.4/km^{2} (156/sq mi)
- Time zone: UTC-06:00 (CST)
- Postal code: S0L 0A0
- Area code: 306
- Highways: Highway 7 Highway 44

Alsask is a special service area in the Rural Municipality of Milton No. 292 in Saskatchewan, Canada. Alsask is located 60 kilometres (37 mi) west of the town of Kindersley. Highway 44 runs to the east of Alsask, and Highway 7 lies a few kilometres to the north. The community had a population of 113 in the 2021 Canadian census (a 1.8% increase from 111 in the 2016 Canadian census).

The community's name combines the names of Alberta and Saskatchewan, although it is a misconception that it straddles the border between the two provinces. It lies approximately 300 metres (980 ft) east of the Alberta border and while the community lies within Saskatchewan, the local cemetery is located in Alberta. Alsask's most notable landmark is one of three remaining radar domes that for many years operated as Canadian Forces Station Alsask as part of the Pinetree Line, operated by the Canadian Armed Forces. Southeast of the town is Alsask Lake.

== History ==
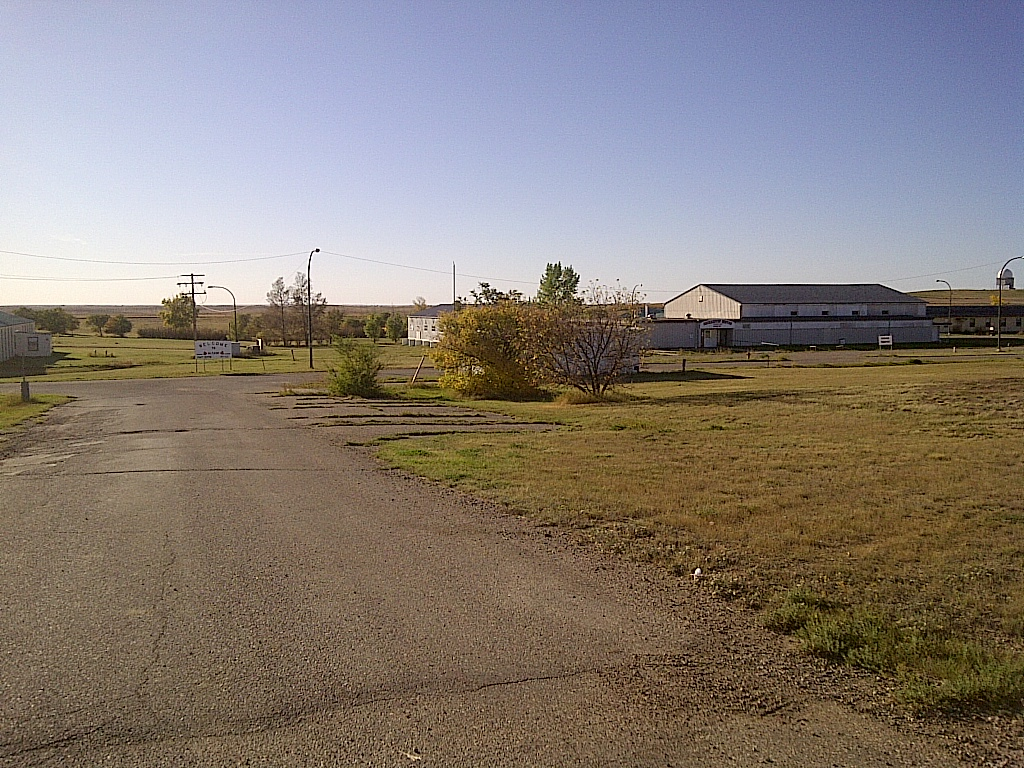
Former military base north of Alsask

Alsask incorporated as a village November 22, 1910; two years later on November 1, 1912, it was decided the village was large enough to incorporate into a town. By 1916 the population of Alsask had reached 300.

The Great Depression in Canada hit Alsask hard, and the village struggled with maintaining its population. The town was reverted to a village on January 1, 1947.

Things began to change; in 1959 with the establishment of Royal Canadian Air Force Station Alsask, a 169 hectares (418 acres) base was established next to the town site, and by the early 1970s the population had reached over 800, though the village never reverted to town status. The base was disbanded in 1987.

Since the closure of the RCAF Station Alsask, the village population continued to decline; by 2009, the Village of Alsask was dissolved as a political entity, and a motion was accepted to join the Rural Municipality of Milton as a special service area on July 30, 2009.

=== Heritage sites ===
CFD Alsask became a designated heritage site in 2002. The site is the former Royal Canadian Air Force Alsask Station, a Cold War era, military base and Pinetree Line radar dome, open to public only a handful of days per year for guided tours operated by the Canadian Civil Defence Museum. Few of the original buildings remain. Most notably, the "Gopher Dip" indoor swimming pool as it was known during the lifespan as a military site, is still in use. During the summer months the swimming pool is well used. The site also includes a bowling alley built to entertain families of the RCAF and Alsask and area residents.

The Old Alsask School operated from its opening in 1913 until 1976 when the property was taken over by the Village of Alsask. In 2002 the building was restored as a community centre and is now listed as a Municipal Heritage Property.

== Demographics ==
In the 2021 Census of Population conducted by Statistics Canada, Alsask had a population of 113 living in 50 of its 67 total private dwellings, a change of 1.8% from its 2016 population of 111. With a land area of 1.87 km^{2} (0.72 sq mi), it had a population density of 60.4/km^{2} (156.5/sq mi) in 2021.

Canada census – Alsask community profile

	2021	2016	2011
Population	113 (1.8% from 2016)	111 (-15.3% from 2011)	131 (1.6% from 2006)
Land area	1.87 km^{2} (0.72 sq mi)	1.82 km^{2} (0.70 sq mi)	1.68 km^{2} (0.65 sq mi)
Population density	60.4/km^{2} (156/sq mi)	61.0/km^{2} (158/sq mi)	77.9/km^{2} (202/sq mi)
Median age		41.5 (M: 49.5, F: 35.8)	41.5 (M: 44.2, F: 37.8)
Private dwellings	67 (total)	86 (total)	72 (total)
Median household income

References: 2021 2016 2011

== Climate ==
Alsask experiences a semi-arid climate (Köppen climate classification: BSk). Winters are long, cold and dry, while summers are short and warm. Precipitation is low, with an annual average of 299.8 mm (11.80 in), and is heavily concentrated in the warmer months. There is a weather station located about 11 km (6.8 mi) southeast of the community, adjacent to Alsask Lake.

Climate data for Alsask Hardene Climate ID: 4020130; coordinates 51°20′N 109°51′W; elevation: 658.4 m (2,160 ft); 1981–2010 normals, extremes 1959–1997
Month	Jan	Feb	Mar	Apr	May	Jun	Jul	Aug	Sep	Oct	Nov	Dec	Year
Record high °C (°F)	12.2 (54.0)	15.5 (59.9)	21.7 (71.1)	31.5 (88.7)	35.0 (95.0)	38.0 (100.4)	38.5 (101.3)	41.7 (107.1)	36.7 (98.1)	29.0 (84.2)	21.1 (70.0)	12.8 (55.0)	41.7 (107.1)
Mean daily maximum °C (°F)	−7.1 (19.2)	−4.4 (24.1)	2.9 (37.2)	12.6 (54.7)	18.9 (66.0)	23.3 (73.9)	25.7 (78.3)	25.6 (78.1)	18.8 (65.8)	11.8 (53.2)	−0.6 (30.9)	−6.5 (20.3)	10.1 (50.2)
Daily mean °C (°F)	−12.7 (9.1)	−9.9 (14.2)	−2.6 (27.3)	5.4 (41.7)	11.5 (52.7)	16.2 (61.2)	18.3 (64.9)	17.8 (64.0)	11.5 (52.7)	4.9 (40.8)	−5.8 (21.6)	−11.9 (10.6)	3.6 (38.5)
Mean daily minimum °C (°F)	−18.2 (−0.8)	−15.4 (4.3)	−8.1 (17.4)	−1.8 (28.8)	4.1 (39.4)	9.0 (48.2)	10.8 (51.4)	9.9 (49.8)	4.1 (39.4)	−2.1 (28.2)	−10.9 (12.4)	−17.1 (1.2)	−3.0 (26.6)
Record low °C (°F)	−46.7 (−52.1)	−43.5 (−46.3)	−36.7 (−34.1)	−31.1 (−24.0)	−9.4 (15.1)	−5.0 (23.0)	1.7 (35.1)	−2.2 (28.0)	−11.7 (10.9)	−27.5 (−17.5)	−36.5 (−33.7)	−44.4 (−47.9)	−46.7 (−52.1)
Average precipitation mm (inches)	8.8 (0.35)	6.2 (0.24)	14.1 (0.56)	17.6 (0.69)	42.9 (1.69)	54.0 (2.13)	59.6 (2.35)	35.0 (1.38)	23.9 (0.94)	12.4 (0.49)	14.0 (0.55)	11.5 (0.45)	299.8 (11.80)
Average rainfall mm (inches)	0.7 (0.03)	0.2 (0.01)	3.4 (0.13)	13.4 (0.53)	42.1 (1.66)	54.0 (2.13)	59.6 (2.35)	35.0 (1.38)	21.0 (0.83)	7.5 (0.30)	1.5 (0.06)	0.5 (0.02)	238.8 (9.40)
Average snowfall cm (inches)	8.1 (3.2)	6.0 (2.4)	10.7 (4.2)	4.2 (1.7)	0.7 (0.3)	0.0 (0.0)	0.0 (0.0)	0.0 (0.0)	2.9 (1.1)	4.9 (1.9)	12.5 (4.9)	11.0 (4.3)	61.0 (24.0)
Average precipitation days (≥ 0.2 mm)	5.9	4.7	6.4	7.3	10.5	12.0	11.3	9.2	7.9	6.0	6.9	5.9	93.9
Average rainy days (≥ 0.2 mm)	0.18	0.12	1.70	5.20	10.40	12.00	11.30	9.20	7.90	4.60	1.10	0.38	64.10
Average snowy days (≥ 0.2 cm)	5.90	4.50	5.10	2.40	0.35	0.00	0.00	0.00	0.53	1.80	5.90	5.70	32.10
Source: Environment and Climate Change Canada

== Notable people ==
Notable persons who were born, grew up, or lived in Alsask:

- Bob Adams — Track and field athlete
- Lorne Shantz — Politician, and former MLA in the British Columbia Legislature

== See also ==
- List of communities in Saskatchewan
