= Springfeld =

Locality in Saskatchewan, Canada

Coordinates: 50.083°N 107.450°W

Location of Springfeld in Saskatchewan

Springfeld is an unincorporated community in Saskatchewan, Canada. According to a 2016 Census, Springfeld, also referred to as Springfield, is home to 878 residents. Access is from Highway 4.

== See also ==
- List of communities in Saskatchewan
