= List of hamlets in Saskatchewan =

In most cases in Saskatchewan, a hamlet is an unincorporated community with at least five occupied dwellings situated on separate lots and at least 10 separate lots, the majority of which are an average size of less than one acre. Saskatchewan has three different types of unincorporated hamlets including generic "hamlets", "special service areas" and "organized hamlets". The exception to unincorporated hamlets in Saskatchewan is a "northern hamlet", which is a type of incorporated municipality.

Saskatchewan has 11 northern hamlets and 187 unincorporated hamlets including 20 generic hamlets, 23 special service areas and 144 organized hamlets. All northern hamlets are within the Northern Saskatchewan Administration District while all unincorporated hamlets are under the jurisdiction of rural municipalities within southern Saskatchewan. The organized hamlets are established via ministerial order.

Some organized hamlets in Saskatchewan are recognized as designated places by Statistics Canada, while generic hamlets are not. The people in a generic hamlet may apply for organized hamlet status within the rural municipality in which it is located.

== Northern hamlets ==
| Name | Incorporation date | Population (2011) | Population (2006) | Change (%) | Land area (km^{2}) | Population density (per km^{2}) |
|---|---|---|---|---|---|---|
| Black Point | March 26, 2008 | 47 | – | – | – | — |
| Cole Bay | November 1, 1983 | 230 | 156 | 47.4 | 4.95 | 46.5 |
| Dore Lake | January 11, 1985 | 28 | 30 | −6.7 | 8.03 | 3.5 |
| Jans Bay | October 1, 1983 | 187 | 181 | 3.3 | 5.94 | 31.5 |
| Michel Village | November 1, 1983 | 66 | 79 | −16.5 | 3.73 | 17.7 |
| Patuanak | December 1, 1983 | 64 | 84 | −23.8 | 1.34 | 47.6 |
| St. George's Hill | December 1, 1983 | 100 | 19 | 426.3 | 1.46 | 68.7 |
| Stony Rapids | April 1, 1992 | 243 | 255 | −4.7 | 3.96 | 61.3 |
| Timber Bay | October 1, 1983 | 93 | 139 | −33.1 | 4.44 | 20.9 |
| Turnor Lake | October 1, 1984 | 179 | 115 | 55.7 | 4.62 | 38.7 |
| Weyakwin | December 1, 1983 | 135 | 99 | 36.4 | 8.20 | 16.5 |
| Total northern hamlets | — | 1,372 | 1,157 | 18.6 | 46.67 | 29.4 |

== Unincorporated hamlets ==
=== Organized hamlets ===
Saskatchewan had 146 organized hamlets in 2019. The number was reduced to 144 on January 1, 2020, when the organized hamlets of Indian Point – Golden Sands and Turtle Lake Lodge amalgamated to form the Resort Village of Turtle View.

| Name | Rural municipality (RM) |
|---|---|
| Alta Vista | McKillop No. 220 |
| Amsterdam | Buchanan No. 304 |
| Arlington Beach | Last Mountain Valley No. 250 |
| Balone Beach | Hoodoo No. 401 |
| Barrier Ford | Bjorkdale No. 426 |
| Bayard | Terrell No. 101 |
| Bayview Heights | Meota No. 468 |
| Beaubier | Lake Alma No. 8 |
| Beaver Creek | Corman Park No. 344 |
| Bellegarde | Storthoaks No. 31 |
| Big Beaver | Happy Valley No. 10 |
| Blumenthal | Rosthern No. 403 |
| Brancepeth | Birch Hills No. 460 |
| Burgis Beach | Good Lake No. 274 |
| Candiac | Montmartre No. 126 |
| Cannington Lake | Wawken No. 93 |
| Caron | Caron No. 162 |
| Casa Rio | Corman Park No. 344 |
| Cathedral Bluffs | Corman Park No. 344 |
| Cedar Villa Estates | Corman Park No. 344 |
| Chelan | Bjorkdale No. 426 |
| Claybank | Elmsthorpe No. 100 |
| Colesdale Park | McKillop No. 220 |
| Collingwood Lakeshore Estates | McKillop No. 220 |
| Congress | Stonehenge No. 73 |
| Corning | Golden West No. 95 |
| Crawford Estates | Edenwold No. 158 |
| Crutwell | Shellbrook No. 493 |
| Crystal Bay-Sunset | Mervin No. 499 |
| Crystal Lake | Keys No. 303 |
| Crystal Springs | Invergordon No. 430 |
| Cudsaskwa Beach | Hoodoo No. 401 |
| Darlings Beach | Lac Pelletier No. 107 |
| Davin | Lajord No. 128 |
| Day's Beach | Meota No. 468 |
| Deer Valley | Lumsden No. 189 |
| Delmas | Battle River No. 438 |
| Demaine | Victory No. 226 |
| Discovery Ridge | Corman Park No. 344 |
| Eagle Ridge Country Estates | Corman Park No. 344 |
| Edgeley | South Qu'Appelle No. 157 |
| Elbow Lake | Hudson Bay No. 394 |
| Elk Ridge | Lakeland No. 521 |
| Erwood | Hudson Bay No. 394 |
| Evergreen Acres | Mervin No. 499 |
| Evergreen Beach | Mervin No. 499 |
| Exner's Twin Bays | Grayson No. 184 |
| Fairholme | Parkdale No. 498 |
| Fairy Glen | Willow Creek No. 458 |
| Fiske | Pleasant Valley No. 288 |
| Frenchman Butte | Frenchman Butte No. 501 |
| Furdale | Corman Park No. 344 |
| Garrick | Torch River No. 488 |
| Good Spirit Acres | Good Lake No. 274 |
| Gray | Lajord No. 128 |
| Greenspot | Grayson No. 184 |
| Gronlid | Willow Creek No. 458 |
| Guernsey | Usborne No. 310 |
| Hagen | Birch Hills No. 460 |
| Hazel Dell | Hazel Dell No. 335 |
| Hendon | Lakeview No. 337 |
| Hitchcock Bay | Coteau No. 255 |
| Hoey | St. Louis No. 431 |
| Holbein | Shellbrook No. 493 |
| Horseshoe Bay | Parkdale No. 498 |
| Kandahar | Big Quill No. 308 |
| Ketchen | Preeceville No. 334 |
| Kopp's Kove | Mervin No. 499 |
| Kronau | Lajord No. 128 |
| Kuroki | Sasman No. 336 |
| Lakeview | Meota No. 468 |
| Lanz Point | Meota No. 468 |
| Little Fishing Lake | Loon Lake No. 561 |
| Little Swan River | Hudson Bay No. 394 |
| Livelong | Mervin No. 499 |
| Lone Rock | Wilton No. 472 |
| MacDowall | Duck Lake No. 463 |
| MacPheat Park | McKillop No. 220 |
| Martinson's Beach | Meota No. 468 |
| Mayfair | Meeting Lake No. 466 |
| Maymont Beach | Meota No. 468 |
| McCord | Mankota No. 45 |
| Merrill Hills | Corman Park No. 344 |
| Meskanaw | Invergordon No. 430 |
| Mohr's Beach | McKillop No. 220 |
| Moose Bay | Grayson No. 184 |
| Mowrey Beach | Mervin No. 499 |
| Mozart | Elfros No. 307 |
| Mullingar | Meeting Lake No. 466 |
| Nesslin Lake | Big River No. 555 |
| Neuanlage | Rosthern No. 403 |
| Neuhorst | Corman Park No. 344 |
| North Colesdale Park | McKillop No. 220 |
| North Shore Fishing Lake | Sasman No. 336 |
| North Weyburn | Weyburn No. 67 |
| Northside | Paddockwood No. 520 |
| Okla | Hazel Dell No. 335 |
| Ormiston | Lake of the Rivers No. 72 |
| Ottman-Murray Beach | Sasman No. 336 |
| Parkland Beach | Mervin No. 499 |
| Parkview | Marquis No. 191 |
| Parry | Caledonia No. 99 |
| Pasqua Lake | North Qu'Appelle No. 187 |
| Peebles | Chester No. 125 |
| Pelican Cove | Leask No. 464 |
| Pelican Point | Meota No. 468 |
| Pelican Shores | Fertile Belt No. 183 |
| Phillips Grove | Big River No. 555 |
| Powm Beach | Mervin No. 499 |
| Prairie River | Porcupine No. 395 |
| Prince | Meota No. 468 |
| Riceton | Lajord No. 128 |
| River's Edge | Corman Park No. 344 |
| Riverside Estates | Corman Park No. 344 |
| Runnymede | Cote No. 271 |
| Sarnia Beach | Sarnia No. 221 |
| Scout Lake | Willow Bunch No. 42 |
| Sleepy Hollow | Meota No. 468 |
| Snowden | Torch River No. 488 |
| Sorensen Beach | McKillop No. 220 |
| South Waterhen Lake | Meadow Lake No. 588 |
| Spring Bay | McKillop No. 220 |
| Spruce Bay | Spiritwood No. 496 |
| Spruce Lake | Mervin No. 499 |
| St. Isidore-de-Bellevue | St. Louis No. 431 |
| St. Joseph's | South Qu'Appelle No. 157 |
| Summerfield Beach | Meota No. 468 |
| Sunset Beach | Grayson No. 184 |
| Sunset View Beach | Mervin No. 499 |
| Swan Plain | Clayton No. 333 |
| Sylvania | Tisdale No. 427 |
| Tadmore | Buchanan No. 304 |
| Taylor Beach | North Qu'Appelle No. 187 |
| Trevessa Beach | Meota No. 468 |
| Trossachs | Brokenshell No. 68 |
| Tuffnell | Foam Lake No. 276 |
| Turtle Lake South Bay | Mervin No. 499 |
| Tway | Invergordon No. 430 |
| Uhl's Bay | McKillop No. 220 |
| Usherville | Preeceville No. 334 |
| West Chatfield Beach | Meota No. 468 |
| Westview | Stanley No. 215 |
| Wishart | Emerald No. 277 |
| Wymark | Swift Current No. 137 |

=== Hamlets ===
| Name | Rural municipality (RM) |
|---|---|
| Ardill | Lake Johnston No. 102 |
| Cactus Lake | Heart's Hill No. 352 |
| Clemenceau | Hudson Bay No. 394 |
| Crane Valley | Excel No. 71 |
| Eldersley | Tisdale No. 427 |
| Fife Lake | Poplar Valley No. 12 |
| Jasmin | Ituna Bon Accord No. 246 |
| Kayville | Key West No. 70 |
| Lady Lake | Preeceville No. 334 |
| Langbank | Silverwood No. 123 |
| Laporte | Chesterfield No. 261 |
| Main Centre | Excelsior No. 166 |
| Mikado | Sliding Hills No. 273 |
| Oungre | Souris Valley No. 7 |
| Percival | Willowdale No. 153 |
| Piapot | Piapot No. 110 |
| Shipman | Torch River No. 488 |
| Simmie | Bone Creek No. 108 |
| Spring Valley | Terrell No. 101 |
| Vantage | Sutton No. 103 |
| Viceroy | Excel No. 71 |

=== Special service areas ===
Like a generic hamlet, a special service area is under the jurisdiction of a rural municipality and does not have any decision-making powers or independent authorities. Unlike a generic hamlet, a special service area may form its own electoral division within the rural municipality and may have a different tax regime within the rural municipality compared to a generic hamlet.

Special service areas of Saskatchewan
| Name | Rural municipality (RM) | Population (2011) |
|---|---|---|
| Admiral | Wise Creek No. 77 | 20 |
| Alsask | Milton No. 292 | 131 |
| Aneroid | Auvergne No. 76 | 40 |
| Antler | Antler No. 61 | 41 |
| Carmichael | Carmichael No. 109 | 30 |
| Crooked River | Bjorkdale No. 426 | 40 |
| Dafoe | Big Quill No. 308 | 15 |
| Domremy | St. Louis No. 431 | 125 |
| Duff | Stanley No. 215 | 30 |
| Findlater | Dufferin No. 190 | 50 |
| Griffin | Griffin No. 66 | 64 |
| Herschel | Mountain View No. 318 | 39 |
| Keeler | Marquis No. 191 | 15 |
| Lake Alma | Lake Alma No. 8 | 30 |
| Leslie | Foam Lake No. 276 | 15 |
| Lestock | Kellross No. 247 | 125 |
| Mantario | Chesterfield No. 261 | 5 |
| Meyronne | Chesterfield No. 261 | 36 |
| Penzance | Sarnia No. 221 | 25 |
| Primate | Eye Hill No. 382 | 45 |
| Rockhaven | Cut Knife No. 439 | 20 |
| Sovereign | St. Andrews No. 287 | 26 |
| Springwater | Biggar No. 347 | 15 |
| Stornoway | Wallace No. 243 | 0 |
| Tribune | Souris Valley No. 7 | 25 |
| Veregin | Sliding Hills No. 273 | 70 |
| Welwyn | Moosomin No. 121 | 135 |
| Willowbrook | Orkney No. 244 | 35 |
| Yellow Creek | Invergordon No. 430 | 73 |

== See also ==
- List of communities in Saskatchewan
