= List of historic places in rural municipalities of Saskatchewan =

This article is a list of historic places in rural municipalities of the province of Saskatchewan entered on the Canadian Register of Historic Places, whether they are federal, provincial, or municipal.

== List of historic places ==
Name	Address	Coordinates	Government recognition (CRHP №)	Wikidata ID	Image
St. Paul's Bergheim Evangelical Lutheran Church	Aberdeen No. 373 SK	52°12′08″N 106°24′54″W	Aberdeen No. 373 municipality (5563)		Upload Photo
Foster School	Abernethy No. 186 SK	50°47′00″N 103°24′04″W	Abernethy No. 186 municipality (1961)		Upload Photo
Kenlis Church	Abernethy No. 186 SK	50°39′03″N 103°26′49″W	Abernethy No. 186 municipality (1954)		
Little Stone Presbyterian Church	Abernethy No. 186 SK	50°44′23″N 103°28′55″W	Abernethy No. 186 municipality (2214)		Upload Photo
Hoosier United Church	Antelope Park No. 322 SK	51°37′33″N 109°44′28″W	Antelope Park No. 322 municipality (4088)		Upload Photo
Pasquia Palaeontological Site, Jordon River	Arborfield No. 456 SK	53°10′19″N 103°31′19″W	Saskatchewan (2377)		Upload Photo
Reynolds Stone House	Argyle No. 1 SK	49°07′05″N 101°25′01″W	Argyle No. 1 municipality (3105)		Upload Photo
Chimney Coulee Provincial Historic Site	Arlington No. 79 SK	49°34′20″N 108°48′25″W	Saskatchewan (2882)		Upload Photo
Chimney Coulee Site	Arlington No. 79 SK	49°34′24″N 108°48′32″W	Arlington No. 79 municipality (2913)		Upload Photo
Napao Site	Auvergne No. 76 SK		Auvergne No. 76 municipality (11927)		Upload Photo
Niska Site	Auvergne No. 76 SK		Auvergne No. 76 municipality (11926)		Upload Photo
Pinto River School	Auvergne No. 76 SK	50°16′44″N 107°46′37″W	Auvergne No. 76 municipality (5785)		Upload Photo
Tillet Hills	Auvergne No. 76 SK	49°45′25″N 107°26′42″W	Auvergne No. 76 municipality (2674)		Upload Photo
Claybank Brick Silo	Baildon No. 131 SK	50°01′56″N 105°12′50″W	Baildon No. 131 municipality (13541)		Upload Photo
McCabe's Grain Elevator	Baildon No. 131 SK	50°16′51″N 105°32′17″W	Baildon No. 131 municipality (13540)		Upload Photo
Everton School	Barrier Valley No. 397 SK	52°29′09″N 103°59′53″W	Barrier Valley No. 397 municipality (10747)		Upload Photo
Loring School	Barrier Valley No. 397 SK	52°32′01″N 104°05′38″W	Barrier Valley No. 397 municipality (16286)		Upload Photo
McKague Roman Catholic Church	1st Avenue & Centre Street; Barrier Valley No. 397 SK	52°36′41″N 103°55′59″W	Barrier Valley No. 397 municipality (10812)		Upload Photo
Anglican Church	Prongua; Battle River No. 438 SK	52°44′37″N 108°32′42″W	Battle River No. 438 municipality (11662)		Upload Photo
St. Laszlo Canadian Magyar Hall	Bayne No. 371 SK	51°29′33″N 105°46′41″W	Bayne No. 371 municipality (2912)		Upload Photo
Northern Beauty School	Beaver River No. 622 SK	54°19′32″N 109°06′04″W	Beaver River No. 622 municipality (7041)		Upload Photo
Roumanian Church	Highway 55; Beaver River No. 622 SK	54°19′34″N 109°51′07″W	Beaver River No. 622 municipality (7424)		Upload Photo
Horizon Community Church Centre	Bengough No. 40 SK	49°31′12″N 105°13′41″W	Bengough No. 40 municipality (1987)		
Horizon Federal Elevator	Bengough No. 40 SK	49°31′14″N 105°13′19″W	Saskatchewan (2570), Bengough No. 40 municipality (2575)		
Ogema Boulder Effigy Protected Area	Bengough No. 40 SK		Saskatchewan (16234)		Upload Photo
Saskatchewan Wheat Pool Elevator	Prongua; Bengough No. 40 SK	49°31′08″N 105°13′30″W	Bengough No. 40 municipality (11690)		Upload Photo
St. Luke's Lutheran Church	Benson No. 35 SK	49°25′11″N 102°54′11″W	Benson No. 35 municipality (3391)		Upload Photo
Amma's House	Big Quill No. 308 SK	51°45′04″N 104°26′10″W	Big Quill No. 308 municipality (8691)		Upload Photo
St. John Bohoslav Krasne Church	Big Quill No. 308 SK	51°36′28″N 104°09′29″W	Big Quill No. 308 municipality (8363)		Upload Photo
Holy Trinity Church	About 8km east of town of Birch Hills; Birch Hills No. 460 SK	52°58′23″N 105°16′08″W	Birch Hills No. 460 municipality (4081)		Upload Photo
St. Saviours Anglican Church	Birch Hills No. 460 SK	52°57′29″N 105°27′40″W	Birch Hills No. 460 municipality (4080)		Upload Photo
Doukhobor Dugout House	Blaine Lake No. 434 SK	52°45′15″N 106°43′26″W	Federal (12190), Saskatchewan (10428)	Q23694815	Upload Photo
Maria DeGirolamo's Residence	Approximately 1.5 km east of Marcelin; Blaine Lake No. 434 SK	52°55′16″N 106°46′37″W	Blaine Lake No. 434 municipality (13870)		Upload Photo
Christ Church - West Patience Lake	S of Hwy 5 about 15 km east of Saskatoon; Blucher No. 434 SK	52°08′36″N 106°23′07″W	Blucher No. 434 municipality (5564)		Upload Photo
Illerbrun District Church	Bone Creek No. 108 SK	49°54′07″N 108°24′54″W	Bone Creek No. 108 municipality (1950)		Upload Photo
Pioneer Hall	Bone Creek No. 108 SK	49°54′10″N 108°23′31″W	Bone Creek No. 108 municipality (2245)		Upload Photo
Monument	Buchanan No. 304 SK	51°49′27″N 102°45′43″W	Buchanan No. 304 municipality (5782)		Upload Photo
Ruthenian Greek Catholic Parish of Assumption of Blessed Virgin Mary of the PT. SE 12-32-4-W2	Buchanan No. 304 SK	51°43′27″N 102°25′55″W	Buchanan No. 304 municipality (5810)		Upload Photo
St. Mary's Church and Site	Buchanan No. 304 SK	51°42′26″N 102°34′59″W	Buchanan No. 304 municipality (5811)		Upload Photo
Big Rock Buffalo Rubbing Stone	Buffalo No. 409 SK	52°36′38″N 108°50′49″W	Buffalo No. 409 municipality (2849)		Upload Photo
Stornoway Ukrainian Greek Orthodox Church of Saints Peter and Paul	Calder No. 241 SK	51°18′05″N 101°55′30″W	Calder No. 241 municipality (7849)		Upload Photo
Ukrainian Greek Orthodox Church of St. Elia	Calder No. 241 SK	51°13′21″N 101°53′06″W	Calder No. 241 municipality (3591)	Q132335417	More images
Bethesda Lutheran Church	Caledonia No. 99 SK	49°58′53″N 104°45′32″W	Caledonia No. 99 municipality (2679)		Upload Photo
Home Quarter of the Wotherspoon Farm	(4 1/2 miles north of Melville on Highway No. 47); Cana No. 214 SK	51°01′06″N 102°48′07″W	Cana No. 214 municipality (16289)		Upload Photo
'Heggie' House	Grid #646; Canaan No. 225 SK	50°47′52″N 107°05′17″W	Canaan No. 225 municipality (7854)		Upload Photo
Gull Lake Protected Area	Carmichael No. 109 SK		Saskatchewan (16233)		Upload Photo
Besant Midden Protected Area	Caron No. 162 SK		Saskatchewan (16231)		Upload Photo
Laporte Community Hall	Chesterfield No. 261 SK	51°12′50″N 109°30′40″W	Chesterfield No. 261 municipality (4086)		Upload Photo
Thingvalla Church and Cemetery	Churchbridge No. 211 SK	50°54′58″N 101°50′31″W	Churchbridge No. 211 municipality (6473)		Upload Photo
Ukrainian Nation Home (Danbury Community Hall)	Clayton No. 333 SK	52°03′23″N 102°14′38″W	Clayton No. 333 municipality (16371)		Upload Photo
La Roche Percee Provincial Historic Site	Coalfields No. 4 SK	49°04′06″N 102°47′46″W	Saskatchewan (2867)	Q131450282	More images
Taylorton Cemetery	Coalfields No. 4 SK	49°07′00″N 102°48′00″W	Coalfields No. 4 municipality (8135)		Upload Photo
Leather River Bridge	Connaught No. 457 SK	53°00′59″N 104°03′50″W	Connaught No. 457 municipality (3588)		Upload Photo
Bone Trail	Corman Park No. 344 SK	52°04′16″N 106°48′47″W	Corman Park No. 344 municipality (10755)		Upload Photo
Harder Archaeological Site Protected Area	Corman Park No. 344 SK		Saskatchewan (16230)		Upload Photo
Opimihaw	Corman Park No. 344 SK	52°13′16″N 106°35′42″W	Saskatchewan (2725)	Q3566179	More images
Birsay United Church	1st Street East; Coteau No. 255 SK	51°05′47″N 106°58′48″W	Coteau No. 255 municipality (7855)		Upload Photo
Hallonquist Church of God	Coulee No. 136 SK	49°30′36″N 107°05′56″W	Coulee No. 136 municipality (5794)		Upload Photo
Gregherd School Site	Cupar No. 218 SK	51°05′44″N 104°20′42″W	Cupar No. 218 municipality (2237)		Upload Photo
Wheatwyn Church	Cupar No. 218 SK		Cupar No. 218 municipality (7065)		Upload Photo
Steven Peterson Residence	Cymri No. 36 SK	49°30′44″N 103°25′16″W	Cymri No. 36 municipality (2615)		Upload Photo
Fort Carlton Provincial Park	Duck Lake No. 463 SK	52°52′N 106°32′W	Federal (18986), Saskatchewan (4168)	Q164074	More images
St. Laurent Shrine	Duck Lake No. 463 SK	52°51′01″N 106°05′38″W	Duck Lake No. 463 municipality (11530)		Upload Photo
Emmanuel Lutheran Church	Frankslake; Edenwold No. 158 SK	50°35′52″N 104°21′44″W	Saskatchewan (2571)		Upload Photo
Etaples School	Edenwold No. 158 SK	50°24′45″N 104°14′42″W	Edenwold No. 158 municipality (9264)		Upload Photo
St. John's Lutheran Church	Edenwold No. 158 SK	50°34′19″N 104°17′56″W	Edenwold No. 158 municipality (1986)		Upload Photo
St. Matthew's Anglican Church - Winnetka	Edenwold No. 158 SK	50°41′21″N 104°19′01″W	Edenwold No. 158 municipality (1984)		Upload Photo
Rectory of the Sacred Heart of Mary Parish	Elcapo No. 154 SK	50°34′45″N 102°39′18″W	Elcapo No. 154 municipality (4959)		Upload Photo
Charlow (Shiloh) Baptist Church and Cemetery	Eldon No. 471 SK	53°18′02″N 109°13′26″W	Eldon No. 471 municipality (4207)	Q111837273	Upload Photo
Claybank Brick Plant	Elmsthorpe No. 100 SK	50°01′54″N 105°13′08″W	Federal (9350), Saskatchewan (2876)	Q2925630	More images
Crystal Hill School	Elmsthorpe No. 100 SK	49°52′20″N 105°14′10″W	Elmsthorpe No. 100 municipality (2376)		Upload Photo
Saskatchewan Wheat Pool Elevator #292	Railway Avenue; Elmsthorpe No. 100 SK	49°54′21″N 104°56′42″W	Elmsthorpe No. 100 municipality (2239)		Upload Photo
St. Joseph's Roman Catholic Church	First Avenue; Elmsthorpe No. 100 SK	50°02′42″N 105°13′55″W	Elmsthorpe No. 100 municipality (11916)		Upload Photo
Old Co-op Store	102 Main Street; Emerald No. 277 SK	51°32′47″N 103°58′34″W	Emerald No. 277 municipality (16287)		Upload Photo
Our Lady of Perpetual Help	Emerald No. 277 SK	51°36′17″N 103°59′13″W	Emerald No. 277 municipality (4970)		Upload Photo
St. Michael's Ukrainian Greek Catholic Parish	Emerald No. 277 SK	51°36′54″N 103°59′13″W	Emerald No. 277 municipality (4969)		Upload Photo
Stone Church Cemetery	Emerald No. 277 SK	51°30′01″N 104°02′06″W	Emerald No. 277 municipality (4966)		Upload Photo
White Eagle Sacred Heart Parish	Emerald No. 277 SK	51°25′26″N 103°45′04″W	Emerald No. 277 municipality (4968)		Upload Photo
Emmanuel Cemetery	Estevan No. 5 SK	49°00′51″N 102°49′23″W	Estevan No. 5 municipality (2546)		Upload Photo
Feathertick Inn	Estevan No. 5 SK	49°06′41″N 102°59′49″W	Estevan No. 5 municipality (6625)	Q5439653	Upload Photo
Morine Farm Residence	Estevan No. 5 SK	49°01′43″N 102°52′44″W	Estevan No. 5 municipality (2926)		Upload Photo
Peace Lutheran Church	18km west of Rush Lake; Excelsior No. 166 SK	50°31′04″N 107°29′39″W	Excelsior No. 166 municipality (8361)		Upload Photo
St. Anthony's Church (Grosswerder) at NW1/4-10-37-27-W3rd	Eye Hill No. 382 SK	52°10′20″N 109°47′06″W	Eye Hill No. 382 municipality (3732)		Upload Photo
Kaposvar Historic Site	Fertile Belt No. 183 SK	50°36′23″N 102°05′10″W	Fertile Belt No. 183 municipality (8023)		Upload Photo
New Stockholm Lutheran Church	Fertile Belt No. 183 SK	50°34′26″N 102°15′29″W	Fertile Belt No. 183 municipality (7427)		Upload Photo
Fort Pitt Provincial Park	Frenchman Butte No. 501 SK	53°34′23″N 109°47′31″W	Federal (18987), Saskatchewan (3112)	Q1438654	More images
Imhoff Museum	Frenchman Butte No. 501 SK	53°34′07″N 109°12′47″W	Frenchman Butte No. 501 municipality (4824)		Upload Photo
Imhoff Studio and Farm Site	Frenchman Butte No. 501 SK	53°34′07″N 109°12′47″W	Saskatchewan (2874)		Upload Photo
St. Mary's Greek Catholic Cemetery	Garry No. 245 SK	51°09′28″N 103°14′53″W	Garry No. 245 municipality (6472)		Upload Photo
Button Barn	Glen Bain No. 105 SK	49°50′05″N 107°12′07″W	Glen Bain No. 105 municipality (8400)		Upload Photo
Trinity Lutheran Church St. Boswells	Glen Bain No. 105 SK	49°55′25″N 106°54′54″W	Glen Bain No. 105 municipality (5789)		Upload Photo
Billimun Church	Glen McPherson No. 46 SK	49°27′03″N 107°13′05″W	Glen McPherson No. 46 municipality (5791)		Upload Photo
Reliance Community Hall	Glen McPherson No. 46 SK	49°39′46″N 107°19′44″W	Glen McPherson No. 46 municipality (5792)		Upload Photo
Emmanuel Lutheran Church	26.5 km northwest of Biggar; Glenside No. 158 SK	52°14′20″N 108°04′30″W	Glenside No. 158 municipality (16252)		Upload Photo
Moore's Ravine	Grandview No. 349 SK		Grandview No. 349 municipality (7050)		Upload Photo
Holy Trinity Ukrainian Greek Orthodox Church	3 km west of Smuts; Grant No. 372 SK	52°26′05″N 106°08′51″W	Grant No. 372 municipality (10756)		
Robert and Adele Schmidt's Double Hip Red Barn	Grant No. 372 SK	52°21′46″N 105°54′29″W	Grant No. 372 municipality (16288)		Upload Photo
Ss. Peter and Paul Ukrainian Catholic Church (Bodnari Church)	5 1/2 miles east of Highway 41; Grant No. 372 SK	52°26′06″N 105°58′30″W	Grant No. 372 municipality (11484)		Upload Photo
St. John the Baptist Ukrainian Greek Catholic Church	Grant No. 372 SK	52°19′06″N 106°06′00″W	Grant No. 372 municipality (9242)	Q18511638	More images
Holy Rosary Shrine	Grass Lake No. 381 SK	52°16′06″N 109°21′36″W	Grass Lake No. 381 municipality (4786)		Upload Photo
Private Residence of Pius Meier	Grass Lake No. 381 SK	52°11′32″N 109°30′04″W	Grass Lake No. 381 municipality (4788)		Upload Photo
Baker Homestead Site	Gravelbourg No. 104 SK	49°59′44″N 106°28′34″W	Gravelbourg No. 104 municipality (6457)		Upload Photo
Bateman United Church	Gravelbourg No. 104 SK	50°00′36″N 106°45′07″W	Gravelbourg No. 104 municipality (5559)		Upload Photo
Crippled Creek Crossing Site	Gravelbourg No. 104 SK	49°55′56″N 106°28′34″W	Gravelbourg No. 104 municipality (2247)		Upload Photo
Eason's Grove	Gravelbourg No. 104 SK	49°59′06″N 106°29′49″W	Gravelbourg No. 104 municipality (6456)		Upload Photo
St. Elizabeth Mission	Gravelbourg No. 104 SK	49°52′52″N 106°49′34″W	Gravelbourg No. 104 municipality (6455)	Q117138175	More images
Trapper's Cabin Site	Gravelbourg No. 104 SK	49°59′20″N 106°29′13″W	Gravelbourg No. 104 municipality (2248)		Upload Photo
Wamsley Bridge Site	Gravelbourg No. 104 SK		Gravelbourg No. 104 municipality (11925)		Upload Photo
Halcyonia Community Centre	Great Bend No. 405 SK	52°27′51″N 107°05′46″W	Great Bend No. 405 municipality (9219)		Upload Photo
Buffalo Effigy	Happy Valley No. 10 SK	49°00′58″N 105°11′13″W	Happy Valley No. 10 municipality (2132)		Upload Photo
Paisley Brook School	Happy Valley No. 10 SK	49°02′16″N 104°59′20″W	Happy Valley No. 10 municipality (9046)		Upload Photo
Sam Kelly Sites	Happy Valley No. 10 SK	49°00′25″N 105°00′04″W	Happy Valley No. 10 municipality (2373)		Upload Photo
Blumenfeld Church	Happyland No. 231 SK	50°44′48″N 109°26′35″W	Happyland No. 231 municipality (3589)		Upload Photo
Smith Barn Site	Happyland No. 231 SK	50°58′20″N 109°39′22″W	Happyland No. 231 municipality (1958)		Upload Photo
St. John's Separate School and Miniature Church	Happyland No. 231 SK	50°45′20″N 109°32′10″W	Happyland No. 231 municipality (2249)		
Eagle Creek Cement Bridge	Harris No. 316 SK	51°45′55″N 107°37′48″W	Harris No. 316 municipality (11485)		Upload Photo
Hillview School	Harris No. 316 SK	51°47′34″N 107°41′35″W	Harris No. 316 municipality (8365)		Upload Photo
Ukrainian Catholic Parish of Holy Eucharist (Kulikiw)	Hazel Dell No. 335 SK	51°54′40″N 103°08′17″W	Hazel Dell No. 335 municipality (10751)		Upload Photo
Bekevar Church	Bekevar Road; Hazelwood No. 94 SK	50°01′05″N 102°35′31″W	Hazelwood No. 94 municipality (3103)		Upload Photo
Canadian National Railway Bridge	Heart's Hill No. 352 SK	52°03′38″N 109°28′55″W	Heart's Hill No. 352 municipality (16213)		Upload Photo
Lilydale School	Hillsdale No. 440 SK	52°55′48″N 109°21′58″W	Hillsdale No. 440 municipality (7859)		Upload Photo
Bonne Madonne Church	Hoodoo No. 401 SK	52°40′16″N 105°31′23″W	Hoodoo No. 401 municipality (9265)		Upload Photo
St. Mary's Ukrainian Greek Orthodox Church	Hoodoo No. 401 SK	52°38′18″N 105°43′16″W	Hoodoo No. 401 municipality (9261)		Upload Photo
St. Michael's Greek Orthodox Church (Bukowina)	Hoodoo No. 401 SK	52°37′26″N 105°36′54″W	Hoodoo No. 401 municipality (1963)		Upload Photo
St. Anthony's Roman Catholic Church	Veillardville Road; Hudson Bay No. 394 SK	52°51′41″N 102°32′20″W	Hudson Bay No. 394 municipality (4061)		Upload Photo
Marysburg Assumption Church	Humboldt No. 370 SK	52°19′06″N 105°04′16″W	Humboldt No. 370 municipality (8942)		Upload Photo
Old Invermay Cemetery	Invermay No. 305 SK	51°47′41″N 103°08′27″W	Invermay No. 305 municipality (19572)		Upload Photo
St. Joseph's Cemetery	Kellross No. 247 SK	51°14′17″N 104°00′29″W	Kellross No. 247 municipality (4903)		Upload Photo
Touchwood Hills Post Provincial Park	Kellross No. 247 SK	51°21′46″N 104°05′46″W	Saskatchewan (3115)	Q22518168	Upload Photo
Ukrainian Catholic Church of the Nativity of the Blessed Virgin Mary	Kellross No. 247 SK	51°11′01″N 103°49′16″W	Kellross No. 247 municipality (4904)		Upload Photo
Municipal Office	Key West No. 70 SK	49°34′48″N 104°55′16″W	Key West No. 70 municipality (4775)		Upload Photo
Mohela Ukrainian Greek Orthodox Church	Keys No. 303 SK	51°44′13″N 102°18′50″W	Keys No. 303 municipality (16262)		Upload Photo
Wilson Hill at SW 20-33-W2	Keys No. 303 SK	51°50′19″N 102°24′22″W	Keys No. 303 municipality (4780)		Upload Photo
Buffalo Rubbing Stone Provincial Historic Site	Kindersley No. 290 SK	51°28′27″N 109°37′19″W	Saskatchewan (2918)	Q115925576	More images
Ptolemy Homestead	King George No. 256 SK	51°15′37″N 107°28′08″W	King George No. 256 municipality (16255)		Upload Photo
Coronation Community Cairn	Kingsley No. 124 SK	50°11′07″N 102°48′07″W	Kingsley No. 124 municipality (2567)		Upload Photo
Highland Baptist Church	Kingsley No. 124 SK	50°13′01″N 102°38′31″W	Kingsley No. 124 municipality (2617)		Upload Photo
Poplar Grove United Church	Kingsley No. 124 SK	50°18′33″N 102°39′32″W	Kingsley No. 124 municipality (2616)		Upload Photo
Zion Lutheran Church	Kingsley No. 124 SK	50°09′50″N 102°48′25″W	Kingsley No. 124 municipality (1960)		Upload Photo
Norden Lutheran Church	Highway 789; Kinistino No. 459 SK	53°06′16″N 105°00′07″W	Kinistino No. 459 municipality (4077)		Upload Photo
Zion Lutheran Church	9km southwest of Kyle; Lacadena No. 228 SK	50°46′28″N 108°07′42″W	Lacadena No. 228 municipality (9196)		Upload Photo
Church and Grotto in St. Peter's Colony	Lajord No. 128 SK	50°20′00″N 104°11′20″W	Lajord No. 128 municipality (16225)		Upload Photo
Kronau Cemetery Site	Lajord No. 128 SK	50°16′24″N 104°16′16″W	Lajord No. 128 municipality (4836)		Upload Photo
Torkelson Farm Site	Lake Alma No. 8 SK	49°09′24″N 104°01′55″W	Lake Alma No. 8 municipality (3323)		Upload Photo
Kermaria Church	Lake Lenore No. 399 SK	52°32′20″N 104°42′58″W	Lake Lenore No. 399 municipality (9249)		Upload Photo
Kinasao Lutheran Bible Camp Log House	Lakeland No. 521 SK	53°33′33″N 105°48′29″W	Lakeland No. 521 municipality (10790)		Upload Photo
Scandia Lutheran Church Site	Highway #35; Lakeview No. 337 SK	52°34′53″N 103°06′11″W	Lakeview No. 337 municipality (3592)		Upload Photo
Swedish Evangelical Lutheran Church	Langenburg No. 181 SK	50°48′13″N 101°34′48″W	Langenburg No. 181 municipality (7326)		Upload Photo
Soda Lake School	Laurier No. 38 SK	49°19′04″N 104°20′17″W	Laurier No. 38 municipality (4854)		Upload Photo
Souris Valley Church	Laurier No. 38 SK	49°23′39″N 104°09′32″W	Laurier No. 38 municipality (4837)		Upload Photo
Former Rosenke farm residence, now known as Flowing Well Manor	Lawtonia No. 135 SK	50°15′06″N 106°54′29″W	Lawtonia No. 135 municipality (5570)		Upload Photo
Zion Lutheran Church	12.5 km north-east of Hodgeville; Lawtonia No. 135 SK	50°00′02″N 106°53′32″W	Lawtonia No. 135 municipality (5568)		Upload Photo
Honeywood Nursery	Leask No. 464 SK	53°06′32″N 106°34′05″W	Saskatchewan (10431), Leask No. 464 municipality (11483)		Upload Photo
St. Mary's Church	Leask No. 464 SK	53°03′55″N 106°25′01″W	Leask No. 464 municipality (11693)		Upload Photo
St. Paul's Lutheran Church (Silvergrove)	Leask No. 464 SK	52°57′33″N 106°29′17″W	Leask No. 464 municipality (11699)		Upload Photo
St. Ignatius Church	Leroy No. 339 SK	51°55′16″N 104°54′40″W	Leroy No. 339 municipality (8364)		Upload Photo
Fort Qu'Appelle - Touchwood Hills Trail Provincial Historic Site	Lipton No. 217 SK	50°50′46″N 103°49′52″W	Saskatchewan (2865)		Upload Photo
Hayward School	Lipton No. 217 SK	50°57′00″N 103°47′56″W	Lipton No. 217 municipality (1948)		Upload Photo
Lipton Jewish Cemetery	Lipton No. 217 SK	50°58′18″N 103°41′24″W	Lipton No. 217 municipality (7502)		Upload Photo
Tomecko House	Lipton No. 217 SK	50°53′59″N 103°51′00″W	Lipton No. 217 municipality (7059)		Upload Photo
Fort Livingstone Protected Area	Livingston No. 331 SK	51°53′58″N 101°57′43″W	Saskatchewan (16227)	Q5471533	More images
Eddy School No. 1846	Longlaketon No. 219 SK	51°00′28″N 104°47′56″W	Longlaketon No. 219 municipality (6149)		Upload Photo
Last Mountain House	Longlaketon No. 219 SK	50°46′27″N 104°52′16″W	Saskatchewan (3734)	Q22370434	More images
Longlaketon United Church	Longlaketon No. 219 SK	50°49′48″N 104°49′30″W	Longlaketon No. 219 municipality (5830)		Upload Photo
Zion (North Southey) Lutheran Church	Longlaketon No. 219 SK	51°03′59″N 104°32′35″W	Longlaketon No. 219 municipality (5831)		Upload Photo
St. Joseph Roman Catholic Church	Barthel; Loon Lake No. 561 SK	53°54′15″N 109°02′34″W	Loon Lake No. 561 municipality (19573)		Upload Photo
Steele Narrows Provincial Park	Loon Lake No. 561 SK	54°02′27″N 109°19′05″W	Saskatchewan (3113)	Q19888219	Upload Photo
Bonnie View Church	Loreburn No. 254 SK	51°12′53″N 106°44′46″W	Loreburn No. 254 municipality (7852)		
Green Valley Lutheran Church	Loreburn No. 254 SK	51°21′30″N 106°55′01″W	Loreburn No. 254 municipality (7853)		Upload Photo
Foxleigh Anglican Church	Loreburn No. 254 SK	50°36′09″N 104°31′30″W	Loreburn No. 254 municipality (5806)		Upload Photo
Emmanuel Lutheran Church	16km north-east of Craven; Lumsden No. 189 SK	50°44′47″N 104°33′32″W	Lumsden No. 189 municipality (5805)		Upload Photo
H. Miller Homestead	Lumsden No. 189 SK	50°37′45″N 104°57′58″W	Lumsden No. 189 municipality (5808)		Upload Photo
J.T. Lauder Homestead	Lumsden No. 189 SK	50°43′12″N 104°43′30″W	Lumsden No. 189 municipality (4976)		Upload Photo
Kennell Anglican Church	Catley Road; Lumsden No. 189 SK	50°43′28″N 104°42′25″W	Lumsden No. 189 municipality (5827)		Upload Photo
Ron Kidd Farm -- Farmhouse	Lumsden No. 189 SK	50°35′45″N 104°53′02″W	Lumsden No. 189 municipality (5809)		Upload Photo
Selger Farms--Seed Farm, Barn and Shed	Flying Creek Road; Lumsden No. 189 SK	50°39′37″N 104°40′05″W	Lumsden No. 189 municipality (5821)		Upload Photo
Billimun Community Centre and Historical Society	Mankota No. 45 SK	49°27′08″N 107°13′01″W	Mankota No. 45 municipality (5799)		Upload Photo
McCord Museum	Railway Avenue at Centre Street in McCord; Mankota No. 45 SK	49°25′39″N 106°49′56″W	Mankota No. 45 municipality (5800)		Upload Photo
Wideview Community Club (School)	Mankota No. 45 SK	49°18′24″N 107°07′41″W	Mankota No. 45 municipality (5796)		Upload Photo
St. Columba Anglican Church	Marquis No. 191 SK	50°34′19″N 105°29′20″W	Marquis No. 191 municipality (16242)		Upload Photo
Earlswood Cemetery and Chapel	Martin No. 122 SK	50°05′44″N 102°00′22″W	Martin No. 122 municipality (2251)		Upload Photo
St. Andrew's Roman Catholic Church, Hall & Cemetery	Martin No. 122 SK	50°08′49″N 101°58′52″W	Martin No. 122 municipality (3392)		Upload Photo
J. Fred Johnston House	McCraney No. 282 SK	51°22′11″N 106°08′28″W	McCraney No. 282 municipality (16253)		Upload Photo
Meuse School	McCraney No. 282 SK	51°22′00″N 106°08′02″W	McCraney No. 282 municipality (7777)		Upload Photo
Marieton Church and Cemetery	McKillop No. 220 SK	51°53′30″N 105°04′41″W	McKillop No. 220 municipality (7003)		Upload Photo
Norrona Church	McKillop No. 220 SK	50°57′00″N 104°58′52″W	McKillop No. 220 municipality (7002)		Upload Photo
Ravineside School	McKillop No. 220 SK	51°00′35″N 105°11′42″W	McKillop No. 220 municipality (7069)		Upload Photo
Pheasant Forks Heritage Site	McLeod No. 185 SK	50°44′00″N 103°12′00″W	McLeod No. 185 municipality (9239)		Upload Photo
Weissenberg School	McLeod No. 185 SK	50°43′14″N 103°11′24″W	McLeod No. 185 municipality (5015)		Upload Photo
Zion Lutheran Church	3 km southwest of Neudorf; McLeod No. 185 SK	50°41′14″N 103°03′05″W	McLeod No. 185 municipality (4962)		Upload Photo
Cabana Community Hall	Meadow Lake No. 588 SK	54°04′42″N 108°15′58″W	Meadow Lake No. 588 municipality (14529)		Upload Photo
St. David's Anglican Church and Cemetery at St. Cyr	Approximately 21 kilometres NE of Meadow Lake; Meadow Lake No. 588 SK	54°13′27″N 108°02′56″W	Meadow Lake No. 588 municipality (3747)		Upload Photo
Oscar Lake School	Meeting Lake No. 466 SK	52°55′46″N 107°15′00″W	Meeting Lake No. 466 municipality (8138)		Upload Photo
St. Joseph's Church	Meeting Lake No. 466 SK	52°59′12″N 107°28′44″W	Meeting Lake No. 466 municipality (8136)		Upload Photo
Scentgrass School	Meota No. 468 SK	52°59′18″N 108°15′14″W	Meota No. 468 municipality (7776)		Upload Photo
Brooksdale School	Mervin No. 499 SK	53°21′59″N 108°46′08″W	Mervin No. 499 municipality (8366)		Upload Photo
Alsask Radar Dome	SK-7 just north of Alsask; Milton No. 292 SK	51°23′16″N 110°00′07″W	Milton No. 292 municipality (4085)	Q16002671	More images
Merid School	Milton No. 292 SK	51°26′06″N 109°53′31″W	Milton No. 292 municipality (4082)		Upload Photo
Swanson School	Montrose No. 315 SK	51°41′39″N 107°08′31″W	Montrose No. 315 municipality (16259)		
Moose Creek United Church and Cemetery	Moose Creek No. 33 SK	49°31′22″N 102°17′53″W	Moose Creek No. 33 municipality (3389)		
Cannington Manor Provincial Park	Moose Mountain No. 63 SK	49°44′03″N 102°02′53″W	Saskatchewan (4167)	Q3364711	More images
Bethel Historical Site	Morris No. 312 SK	51°39′00″N 105°49′48″W	Morris No. 312 municipality (4892)		Upload Photo
Covenant Church	Morris No. 312 SK	51°47′40″N 105°42′54″W	Morris No. 312 municipality (4894)		Upload Photo
Kutawa School District No. 477	Mount Hope No. 279 SK	51°25′07″N 104°12′29″W	Mount Hope No. 279 municipality (7497)		Upload Photo
Herschel Petroglyph/Tipi Ring Site	Mountain View No. 318 SK	51°37′26″N 108°23′56″W	Mountain View No. 318 municipality (2133)		Upload Photo
Stranraer United Church	Mountain View No. 318 SK	51°42′32″N 108°29′24″W	Mountain View No. 318 municipality (4133)		Upload Photo
Lemsford Ferry Tipi Rings Protected Area	Newcombe No. 260 SK		Saskatchewan (16229)		Upload Photo
Ukrainian Catholic Parish of St. John the Baptist	Newcombe No. 260 SK	51°19′47″N 109°14′20″W	Newcombe No. 260 municipality (11919)		Upload Photo
Inkster School Building and the Inkster School Teacherage	Nipawin No. 487 SK	53°16′16″N 104°06′00″W	Nipawin No. 487 municipality (3786)		Upload Photo
Addison Sod House	Oakdale No. 320 SK	51°37′18″N 109°00′58″W	Federal (14361), Saskatchewan (2780)	Q4681283	Upload Photo
Elm Springs Roumanian Orthodox Church	Old Post No. 43 SK	49°25′N 106°13′W	Old Post No. 43 municipality (9197)		Upload Photo
Wood Mountain Post Provincial Park	Old Post No. 43 SK	49°18′53″N 106°22′41″W	Saskatchewan (3733)	Q22634168	Upload Photo
Orkney Church	Orkney No. 244 SK	51°15′16″N 102°34′01″W	Orkney No. 244 municipality (5816)		Upload Photo
Orkney School	Orkney No. 244 SK	51°15′19″N 102°34′05″W	Orkney No. 244 municipality (2667)		Upload Photo
Pine Valley School	Paddockwood No. 520 SK	53°39′N 105°33′W	Paddockwood No. 520 municipality (11489)		Upload Photo
Alex Lennie House	Main Street, Bresaylor; Paynton No. 470 SK	52°58′12″N 108°45′56″W	Paynton No. 470 municipality (11697)		Upload Photo
Gerald R. (Slyvia) Nuttall House	Pense No. 160 SK	50°25′38″N 104°57′04″W	Pense No. 160 municipality (6623)		Upload Photo
Three storey, red brick house of Marjorie LaSalle	Pense No. 160 SK	50°31′20″N 105°08′53″W	Pense No. 160 municipality (11917)		Upload Photo
Babulynci Church	Ponass Lake No. 367 SK	52°10′22″N 103°56′46″W	Ponass Lake No. 367 municipality (4856)		Upload Photo
Bethel Church	Ponass Lake No. 367 SK	52°13′53″N 104°03′58″W	Ponass Lake No. 367 municipality (4855)		Upload Photo
Scrip United Church	Ponass Lake No. 367 SK	52°13′53″N 104°03′58″W	Ponass Lake No. 367 municipality (4857)		Upload Photo
St. Michael's Ukrainian Catholic Church	Ponass Lake No. 367 SK	52°09′21″N 104°00′18″W	Ponass Lake No. 367 municipality (2671)		Upload Photo
Prairie River railway station	Railway Street; Porcupine No. 395 SK	52°51′51″N 102°59′42″W	Porcupine No. 395 municipality (4901)	Q7237959	Upload Photo
Former Presbyterian Church	Porcupine No. 395 SK	52°34′53″N 103°06′11″W	Porcupine No. 395 municipality (10752)		Upload Photo
Saint Andrews Anglican Church	Porcupine No. 395 SK	52°40′04″N 103°03′47″W	Porcupine No. 395 municipality (16374)		Upload Photo
Tall Spruce School	Highway # 23; Porcupine No. 395 SK	52°36′08″N 103°10′19″W	Porcupine No. 395 municipality (10753)		Upload Photo
Chechow Church	Preeceville No. 334 SK	51°56′22″N 102°47′13″W	Preeceville No. 334 municipality (16284)		Upload Photo
North Prairie Scandinavian Lutheran Church	Grid 753; Preeceville No. 334 SK	52°03′19″N 102°44′38″W	Preeceville No. 334 municipality (3947)		Upload Photo
St. Demetrius Orthodox Church	Preeceville No. 334 SK	52°01′25″N 102°36′04″W	Preeceville No. 334 municipality (3948)		Upload Photo
St. Andrew's (Halcro) Anglican Church and Cemetery	Halcro Church Road; Prince Albert No. 461 SK	53°01′20″N 105°42′54″W	Prince Albert No. 461 municipality (11490)		
St. Catherine's Anglican Cemetery	Prince Albert No. 461 SK	53°09′11″N 105°54′58″W	Prince Albert No. 461 municipality (16281)		Upload Photo
St. Mary's Anglican Church and Cemetery	Prince Albert No. 461 SK	53°13′06″N 106°23′17″W	Prince Albert No. 461 municipality (11525)		Upload Photo
St. Paul's Lindsay Cemetery	Prince Albert No. 461 SK	53°56′00″N 105°04′26″W	Prince Albert No. 461 municipality (16282)		Upload Photo
Vintage Power Machines	Prince Albert No. 461 SK	53°06′40″N 105°49′55″W	Prince Albert No. 461 municipality (11526)		Upload Photo
Ruthenian Greek Catholic Church of the Presentation of the Blessed Virgin Mary	Redberry No. 435 SK	52°38′19″N 107°18′36″W	Redberry No. 435 municipality (11694)		Upload Photo
Ukrainian Greek Orthodox Church of the Assumption of the Virgin Mary	Redberry No. 435 SK	52°35′41″N 107°12′11″W	Redberry No. 435 municipality (11695)		Upload Photo
Leipzig Convent	Reford No. 379 SK	52°11′14″N 108°40′52″W	Reford No. 379 municipality (4208)	Q16960293	Upload Photo
St. John's Lutheran Church and Cemetery	Riverside No. 168 SK	50°29′58″N 108°23′17″W	Riverside No. 168 municipality (4148)		Upload Photo
Petite Ville	Rosthern No. 403 SK	52°37′06″N 106°08′10″W	Saskatchewan (2375)		Upload Photo
Moe Lutheran Church	Sasman No. 336 SK	51°52′53″N 103°18′14″W	Sasman No. 336 municipality (10750)		Upload Photo
Cotswold School	Senlac No. 411 SK	52°25′22″N 109°46′08″W	Senlac No. 411 municipality (7851)		Upload Photo
Lot Four Block Four	Senlac No. 411 SK	52°37′03″N 109°30′18″W	Senlac No. 411 municipality (7844)		Upload Photo
Backwoods Beds and Berries	Approximately 3 km north of Holbein; Shellbrook No. 493 SK	53°15′29″N 106°11′46″W	Shellbrook No. 493 municipality (13868)		Upload Photo
Holy Trinity Anglican Church Site	SK-693, approximately 20 km northeast of Shellbrook; Shellbrook No. 493 SK	53°24′08″N 106°11′12″W	Shellbrook No. 493 municipality (2677)		Upload Photo
Boggy Creek School	Sherwood No. 159 SK	50°34′17″N 104°45′14″W	Sherwood No. 159 municipality (2236)		Upload Photo
Normand Homestead	Zehner Road; Sherwood No. 159 SK	50°34′12″N 104°34′30″W	Sherwood No. 159 municipality (5826)		Upload Photo
Fairmede United Church of Canada	Sherwood No. 159 SK	50°03′43″N 102°01′44″W	Sherwood No. 159 municipality (3395)		Upload Photo
St. Hubert's Cemetery	St. Hubert Road; Sherwood No. 159 SK	50°13′34″N 102°19′59″W	Sherwood No. 159 municipality (3394)		Upload Photo
St. Hubert's Church and Cemetery	St. Hubert Road; Sherwood No. 159 SK	50°12′44″N 102°21′22″W	Sherwood No. 159 municipality (3393)		Upload Photo
Greek Catholic Church of Transfiguration	Approximately 12 km north of Rheim; Sliding Hills No. 273 SK	51°29′25″N 102°11′36″W	Sliding Hills No. 273 municipality (19245)		Upload Photo
Holy Assumption St. Mary’s Ukrainian Orthodox Church	Approximately 12 km northwest of Rheim; Sliding Hills No. 273 SK	51°29′24″N 102°12′42″W	Sliding Hills No. 273 municipality (19246)		Upload Photo
Edgeley United Church	South Qu'Appelle No. 157 SK	50°38′13″N 103°59′46″W	South Qu'Appelle No. 157 municipality (9232)		Upload Photo
St. Joseph's Dancehall	South Qu'Appelle No. 157 SK	50°29′42″N 104°10′37″W	South Qu'Appelle No. 157 municipality (9224)		Upload Photo
St. Joseph's Roman Catholic Church, Rectory and School	St. Paul Street & St. Peter Street; South Qu'Appelle No. 157 SK	50°29′00″N 104°16′01″W	South Qu'Appelle No. 157 municipality (9238)		Upload Photo
St. Thomas Anglican Church	6.5 km northeast of McLean; South Qu'Appelle No. 157 SK	50°33′53″N 104°01′20″W	South Qu'Appelle No. 157 municipality (9223)		Upload Photo
St. Michael's Anglican Church	Spalding No. 368 SK	52°10′23″N 104°12′25″W	Spalding No. 368 municipality (2130)		Upload Photo
Mirror Lake School, District No. 5086	Spiritwood No. 496 SK	53°16′15″N 107°19′05″W	Spiritwood No. 496 municipality (8017)		Upload Photo
Timberland School	Spiritwood No. 496 SK	53°39′54″N 107°25′52″W	Spiritwood No. 496 municipality (8018)		Upload Photo
Hamona Provincial Historic Site	Spy Hill No. 152 SK	50°31′39″N 101°40′23″W	Saskatchewan (2868)	Q115925584	Upload Photo
Voysey Farmhouse Site	Spy Hill No. 152 SK	50°36′27″N 101°40′19″W	Spy Hill No. 152 municipality (16260)		Upload Photo
Bethania Norwegian Evangelical Lutheran Church	St. Louis No. 431 SK	52°48′21″N 105°32′53″W	St. Louis No. 431 municipality (11527)		Upload Photo
Old Municipal Office at Hoey	St. Louis No. 431 SK	52°53′56″N 105°36′29″W	St. Louis No. 431 municipality (11528)		Upload Photo
Saron Evangelical Lutheran Church	St. Louis No. 431 SK	52°53′56″N 105°36′29″W	St. Louis No. 431 municipality (11529)		Upload Photo
South Branch House Provincial Historic Site	St. Louis No. 431 SK	52°53′29″N 106°01′59″W	Saskatchewan (2864)	Q7566368	Upload Photo
Arnold Dauk Sr. Residence	St. Peter No. 369 SK	52°19′50″N 104°48′29″W	St. Peter No. 369 municipality (8362)		Upload Photo
St. Peter's Cathedral	St. Peter No. 369 SK	52°11′51″N 104°59′06″W	St. Peter No. 369 municipality (8678)	Q125455847	More images
Fort Pelly #1 Provincial Historic Site	St. Philips No. 301 SK	51°46′43″N 102°00′18″W	Saskatchewan (2869)		Upload Photo
Ukrainian Orthodox Church of Ascension	St. Philips No. 301 SK	51°48′09″N 101°40′19″W	St. Philips No. 301 municipality (5818)		Upload Photo
South Star School	Star City No. 428 SK	52°43′31″N 104°18′00″W	Star City No. 428 municipality (4893)		Upload Photo
Maxstone School	Stonehenge No. 73 SK	49°29′44″N 106°01′44″W	Stonehenge No. 73 municipality (5581)		Upload Photo
Peace Lutheran Church	Stonehenge No. 73 SK	49°31′54″N 106°16′30″W	Stonehenge No. 73 municipality (1982)		Upload Photo
Saint Peter and Saint Paul Orthodox Church	Stonehenge No. 73 SK	49°31′19″N 106°20′35″W	Stonehenge No. 73 municipality (6624)		Upload Photo
Saint Peter and Saint Paul Orthodox Church Hall	Stonehenge No. 73 SK	49°31′17″N 106°20′35″W	Stonehenge No. 73 municipality (6622)		Upload Photo
St. Mary's Mission of Maxstone	Stonehenge No. 73 SK	49°29′41″N 106°01′41″W	Stonehenge No. 73 municipality (5582)		Upload Photo
Swift Current Creek Petroglyph Boulder	Swift Current No. 137 SK		Saskatchewan (5842)		Upload Photo
Little Moose Church	Three Lakes No. 400 SK	52°38′19″N 105°06′00″W	Three Lakes No. 400 municipality (9247)		Upload Photo
Marcel Vey Farm Yard Site	Three Lakes No. 400 SK	52°38′21″N 105°26′20″W	Three Lakes No. 400 municipality (9263)		Upload Photo
File Hills Post Office\Thompson Farm	Thompson Road; Tullymet No. 216 SK	51°04′53″N 103°30′43″W	Tullymet No. 216 municipality (2757)		Upload Photo
Jewish Cemetery	About 8 km east of Lipton; Tullymet No. 216 SK	50°58′20″N 103°41′26″W	Tullymet No. 216 municipality (7503)		Upload Photo
Tullymet Yard	Tullymet Road; Tullymet No. 216 SK	51°00′21″N 103°32′42″W	Tullymet No. 216 municipality (2758)		Upload Photo
Pine Island Trading Post Protected Area	Turtle River No. 469 SK		Saskatchewan (16235)		Upload Photo
Town of Watrous Pumphouse	Usborne No. 310 SK	51°42′33″N 105°22′48″W	Usborne No. 310 municipality (7498)		Upload Photo
Anglican Church	Val Marie No. 17 SK	49°08′36″N 107°54′36″W	Val Marie No. 17 municipality (4772)		Upload Photo
Morris School	Viscount No. 341 SK	51°49′23″N 105°39′07″W	Viscount No. 341 municipality (6619)		Upload Photo
Elizabeth Gordon Residence	Webb No. 138 SK	50°08′16″N 108°10′05″W	Webb No. 138 municipality (9044)		Upload Photo
Walter Felt Bison Drive Protected Area	Wheatlands No. 163 SK		Saskatchewan (16232)		Upload Photo
Brownville Community Club	White Valley No. 49 SK	49°28′30″N 108°39′07″W	White Valley No. 49 municipality (2915)		Upload Photo
White Valley Lutheran Church	White Valley No. 49 SK	49°26′19″N 108°31′16″W	White Valley No. 49 municipality (2682)		Upload Photo
St. Victor Petroglyphs Provincial Park	Willow Bunch No. 42 SK	49°24′43″N 105°52′05″W	Saskatchewan (3114)	Q22379972	Upload Photo
Beth Israel Synagogue	Willow Creek No. 458 SK	53°03′36″N 104°20′35″W	Willow Creek No. 458 municipality (1949)	Q4897537	Upload Photo
McKay School No. 135	Willowdale No. 153 SK	50°20′00″N 102°16′01″W	Willowdale No. 153 municipality (9236)		Upload Photo
Percival Windmill	Trans-Canada Highway; Willowdale No. 153 SK	50°22′02″N 102°25′08″W	Willowdale No. 153 municipality (3104)		Upload Photo
Swanson Barn	Willowdale No. 153 SK	50°12′04″N 102°14′13″W	Willowdale No. 153 municipality (9255)		Upload Photo
Ellisboro Anglican Church	Wolseley No. 155 SK	50°31′16″N 103°13′16″W	Wolseley No. 155 municipality (2070)		Upload Photo
Ellisboro United Church	Wolseley No. 155 SK	50°31′16″N 103°13′08″W	Wolseley No. 155 municipality (2448)		Upload Photo
Brithdir United Church	Wolverine No. 340 SK	52°01′21″N 105°20′20″W	Wolverine No. 340 municipality (16261)		Upload Photo
Mancroft Church	Wolverine No. 340 SK	52°07′14″N 105°17′20″W	Wolverine No. 340 municipality (8534)		Upload Photo

== See also ==
- List of National Historic Sites of Canada in Saskatchewan
- List of historic places in Saskatchewan
