= Touchwood Hills =

Hilly plateau in Saskatchewan, Canada

- Location within Saskatchewan Location within Canada

Highest point
- Elevation: 754 m (2,474 ft)
- Coordinates: 51°18′38″N 104°11′21″W

Geography
- Location: South-central Saskatchewan, Canada
- Parent range: Touchwood Uplands

Touchwood Hills are a range of hills in the Canadian province of Saskatchewan. The hills are composed of the "Big" Touchwood Hills and the Little Touchwood Hills. Together they are referred to as the Touchwood Uplands. The hills are in the Prairie Pothole Region of North America, which extends throughout three Canadian provinces and five U.S. states, and within Palliser's Triangle and the Great Plains ecoregion of Canada.

The hills make up a large plateau that is north-east of Saskatchewan's capital city, Regina. To the west of the hills is Last Mountain Lake; to the north are the Quill Lakes, Foam Lake, and Fishing Lake; to the east is Good Spirit Lake; and to the south is the Qu'Appelle Valley. Several rivers flow out of the hills, such as the south flowing Qu'Appelle River tributaries of East Loon Creek (via Loon Creek), Jumping Deer Creek, Pheasant Creek, and Pearl Creek. To the north, rivers such as Dafoe Brook, Birch Creek, Bevcar Brook, Beckett Brook, and Milligan Creek work their way into the Quill Lakes. Milligan Creek and its tributaries are the primary inflows for Foam Lake and the Quill Lakes.

Highway 35 cuts across the plateau in a north to south direction and Highway 15 heads in an east to west direction cutting between Big Touchwood and Little Touchwood Hills. To the north and east of the hills is Highway 16, also known as the Yellowhead Highway, and to the south is Highway 10. Highway 6 runs past the western side of the plateau.

In 2005, Ducks Unlimited Canada announced a ten-year study of how nesting success of prairie waterfowl varies in relation to the landscape types of the prairie pothole region, to be conducted in the Touchwood Hills area.

== Touchwood Hills Regional Economic Development Authority ==
The Touchwood Hills Regional Economic Development Authority (REDA) was created in 1995, and was the tenth REDA created in the province. It included the rural municipalities of Tullymet, Lipton, Cupar, Garry, Ituna Bon Accord, Kellross, Touchwood, Emerald and Kutawa; the towns of Cupar, Ituna, and Southey; and the villages of Dysart, Hubbard, Kelliher, and Leross; the Crossroads Rural Development Corporation and the Carlton Trail Regional College.

== Touchwood Hills Post ==
Touchwood Hills Post was a Hudson's Bay Company (HBC) trading post in the Touchwood Hills from 1852 to 1909. It was one of the few HBC posts not built on a river and supplied by canoe. Rather it was a resupply point and stopping place on the part of the Carlton Trail that ran from Fort Ellice on the Assiniboine River north-west to Fort Carlton on the North Saskatchewan River. The section of the Carlton Trail that runs from the Touchwood Hills to the Fishing Lakes is called the Fort Qu'Appelle-Touchwood Hills Trail.

All that remains of the original fort is the cellar depression and a segment of the Carlton Trail with Red River cart tracks. In 1986, the Touchwood Hills Post historic park was designated a Provincial Park.

== Touchwood Hills People ==
The Touchwood Hills People, or Pusakawatciwiyiniwak were part of a larger group known as the Downstream People, or Mamihkiyiniwak, who occupied the south-eastern plains and utilized the Assiniboine River, Red River, and Lake Winnipeg waterways. The Touchwood Hills People consisted of four bands under the leadership of chief Kawacatoose (Poorman or Lean Man): Kawacatoose, Kaneonuskatew (One that walks on four claws or George Gordon), Muscowequan (Hard Quill), and Kisecawchuck (Daystar). Kawacatoose and the other chiefs signed Treaty 4, which created the Kawacatoose First Nation, Gordon First Nation, Muskowekwan First Nation, and Day Star First Nation. Along with the Fishing Lake First Nation, these bands are collectively a part of the Touchwood Agency Tribal Chiefs (TATC).

== See also ==
- List of protected areas of Saskatchewan
- Geography of Saskatchewan
- List of mountains of Saskatchewan
