= Saskatchewan Highway 22 =

Provincial highway in Saskatchewan, Canada

Highway 22
- Highway 22 highlighted in red
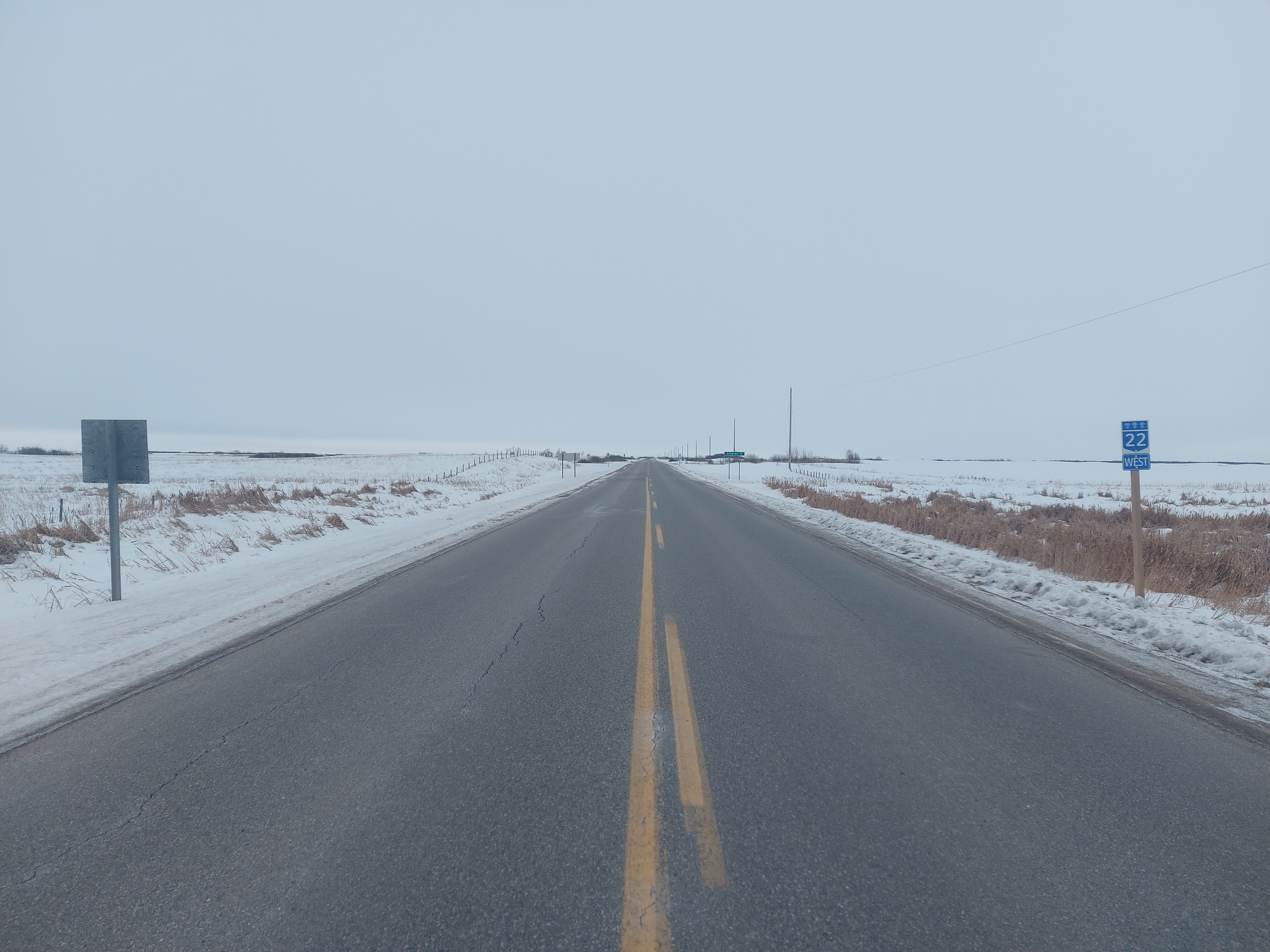
- Highway 22

Route information
- Maintained by Ministry of Highways and Infrastructure
- Length: 273.4 km (169.9 mi)

West segment
- Length: 77.3 km (48.0 mi)
- West end: Highway 20 near Bulyea
- Major intersections: Highway 6 / CanAm Highway at Southey
- East end: Highway 35 near Lipton

East segment
- Length: 154.4 km (95.9 mi)
- West end: Highway 10 near Balcarres
- Major intersections: Highway 47 near Killaly; Highway 9 near Stockholm; Highway 80 near Esterhazy; Highway 8 near Spy Hill
- East end: PR 478 at Manitoba border near Binscarth

Location
- Country: Canada
- Province: Saskatchewan
- Rural municipalities: McKillop, Longlaketon, Cupar, Lipton, Abernethy, McLeod, Grayson, Fertile Belt, Spy Hill
- Towns: Esterhazy

Highway system
- Provincial highways in Saskatchewan
← Highway 21	→ Highway 23

Highway 22 is a provincial highway in the Canadian province of Saskatchewan. The highway is split into two segments; the western segment is 77 kilometres (48 mi) long and runs from Highway 20 south of Bulyea to Highway 35 at Lipton, while the eastern segment is 154 kilometres (96 mi) long and runs from Highway 10 east of Balcarres to the Manitoba border where it continues as Provincial Road 478. The highway is split by a 42-kilometre (26 mi) gap that travels through Fort Qu'Appelle; the two segments are connected by Highways 35 and 10 and functions like an unsigned concurrency, though some maps show it as continuous.

== Route description ==
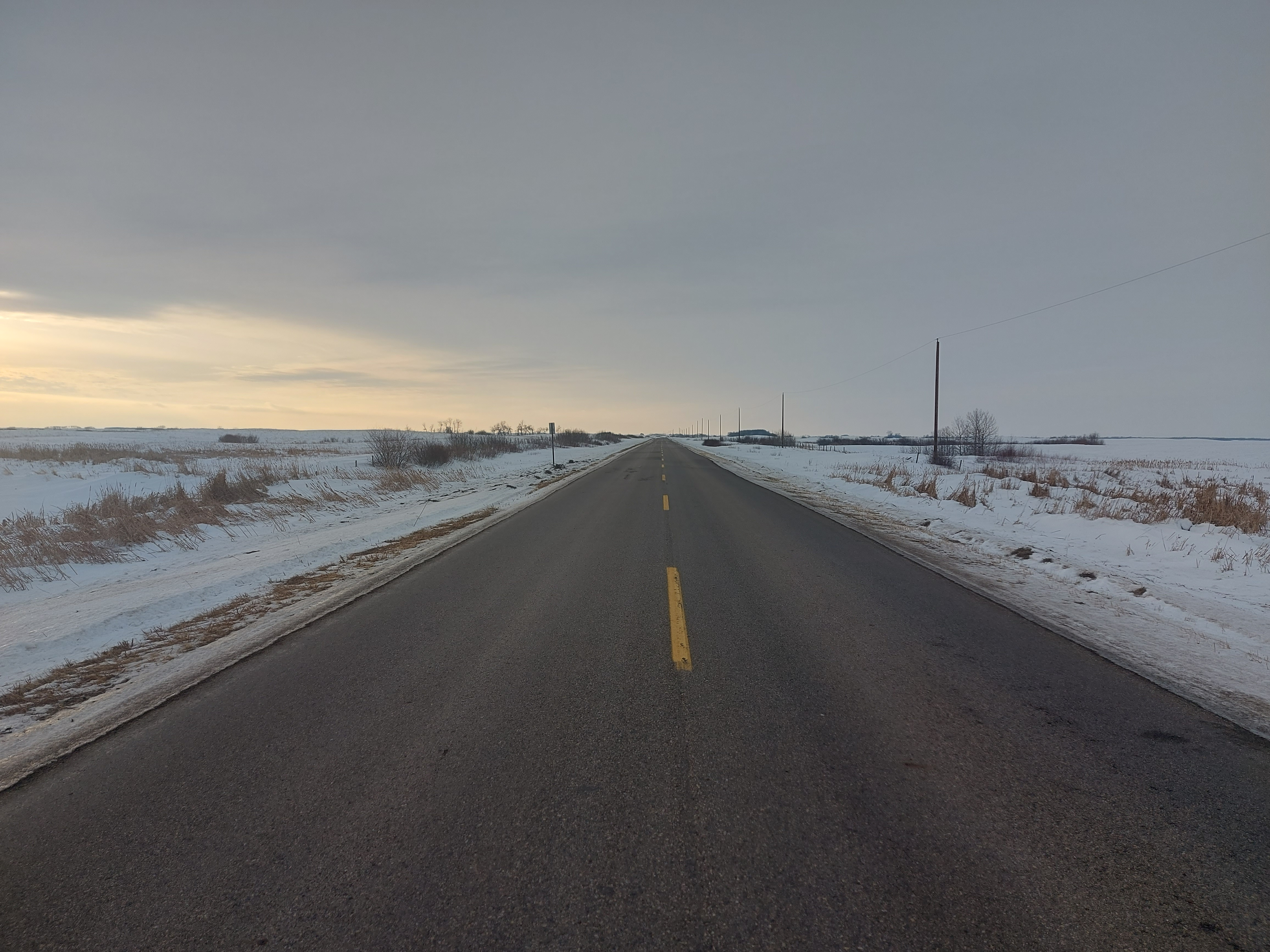
Highway 22

The western terminus of the western segment of Highway 22 begins at Highway 20 less than 4 kilometres (2.5 mi) south of Bulyea. From there, the highway heads east towards Earl Grey. It then continues eastward and provides access to the communities of Southey (where it crosses the CanAm Highway (Highway 6)), Markinch, Cupar, and Dysart before ending at Highway 35 on the east side of Lipton.

The eastern segment of Highway 22 begins at Highway 10 8.2 kilometres (5.1 mi) east of Balcarres and travels south to Abernethy. About 3 kilometres (1.9 mi) south of Abernethy, just off Highway 22, is the historic Motherwell Homestead. Highway 22 heads east from Abernethy where it crosses Pheasant Creek — a tributary of the Qu'Appelle River — en route to a 1.6-kilometre (1 mi) concurrency with Highway 617 at Lemberg. Continuing east from Lemburg, it provides access to Neudorf and Killaly and has a 3.3-kilometre (2.1 mi) southbound concurrency with Highway 47. Continuing east from 47, the highway runs through Grayson en route to Highway 9 (Saskota Flyway) at which point it begins an 18-kilometre (11 mi) concurrency that runs south to Dubuc then east to Stockholm. Highway 9 drops south at that point and Highway 22 continues east to Esterhazy. About 2 kilometres (1.2 mi) east of Esterhazy, Highway 22 has a T junction with Highway 80 in which Highway 80 is the straight-through road that heads north-east then north to Churchbridge and Highway 16 while Highway 22 turns south-east. After about 1.5 kilometres (0.9 mi), Highway 22 resumes its eastward travel to Highway 8. It has a 1.6 kilometres (1 mi) southbound concurrency with 8 before turning east and travelling straight to the border with Manitoba. In Manitoba, Highway 22 continues as Provincial Road 478.

== Major intersections ==
Rural municipality	Location	km	mi	Destinations	Notes
McKillop No. 220		0.0	0.0	Highway 20 – Strasbourg, Lumsden	South of Bulyea
Longlaketon No. 219	Earl Grey	11.9	7.4	Highway 641	
Cupar No. 218	Southey	26.6	16.5	Highway 6 / CanAm Highway – Melfort, Regina	
Cupar No. 218	Cupar	46.8	29.1	Highway 640 south – Edenwold	West end of Highway 640 concurrency
Cupar No. 218		48.5	30.1	Highway 640 north	East end of Highway 640 concurrency
Lipton No. 217	Dysart	60.2	37.4	Highway 639 north	West end of Highway 639 concurrency
Lipton No. 217		62.3	38.7	Highway 639 south	East end of Highway 639 concurrency
Lipton No. 217	Lipton	77.3	48.0	Highway 35 – Leross, Fort Qu'Appelle	
41.7 km (25.9 mi) gap in Highway 22
Abernethy No. 186		119.0	73.9	Highway 10 – Melville, Yorkton, Fort Qu'Appelle, Regina	East of Balcarres
Abernethy No. 186	Abernethy	124.9	77.6		
McLeod No. 185	Lemberg	140.9	87.6	Highway 617 north – Goodeve	West end of Highway 617 concurrency
McLeod No. 185	Lemberg	142.6	88.6	Highway 617 south – Wolseley	East end of Highway 617 concurrency
McLeod No. 185		162.1	100.7	Highway 618 north	
Grayson No. 184	Killaly	170.7	106.1	Highway 47 north – Melville	West end of Highway 47 concurrency
Grayson No. 184		174.0	108.1	Highway 47 south – Grenfell, Estevan	East end of Highway 47 concurrency
Grayson No. 184	Grayson	187.0	116.2	Highway 605 south	
Fertile Belt No. 183		198.5	123.3	Highway 9 north (Saskota Flyway) – Yorkton	West end of Highway 9 concurrency
Fertile Belt No. 183	Dubuc	202.5	125.8	Highway 638 south	
Fertile Belt No. 183	Stockholm	216.2	134.3	Highway 9 south (Saskota Flyway) – Whitewood	East end of Highway 9 concurrency
Fertile Belt No. 183		221.1	137.4	Atwater Access Road	
Fertile Belt No. 183	Esterhazy	231.3	143.7	Highway 637 (Summer Street)	
Fertile Belt No. 183	Esterhazy	233.8	145.3	Highway 80 north – Churchbridge	
Spy Hill No. 152		252.0	156.6	Highway 636 north – Gerald	
Spy Hill No. 152		258.6	160.7	Highway 8 north – Langenburg	West end of Highway 8 concurrency
Spy Hill No. 152		260.3	161.7	Highway 8 south – Spy Hill, Moosomin	East end of Highway 8 concurrency
Spy Hill No. 152		273.4	169.9	PR 478 east – Binscarth	Continuation into Manitoba
1.000 mi = 1.609 km; 1.000 km = 0.621 mi: Concurrency terminus; Route transition
