= Neudorf, Saskatchewan =

Village in Saskatchewan, Canada

- Village
- Location of Neudorf in Saskatchewan Neudorf, Saskatchewan (Canada)
- Coordinates: 50.709722°N 103.014167°W
- Country: Canada
- Province: Saskatchewan
- Region: Southwest Saskatchewan
- Rural Municipality: McLeod No. 185
- Post Office Established: July 1, 1895
- Postal code: S0A 2T0
- Area code: 306
- Highways: Highway 22
- Website: Village of Neudorf Archived 2012-03-31 at the Wayback Machine

Neudorf (2016 population: 263) is a village in the Canadian province of Saskatchewan within the Rural Municipality of McLeod No. 185 and Census Division No. 5. It is on Highway 22 east of Lemberg, and Abernethy, and west of Killaly.

The community was established prior to the arrival of the Canadian Pacific Railway; when it arrived the community was designated a divisional point, leading to a population boom.

== History ==
Neudorf incorporated as a village on April 25, 1905.

== Demographics ==
Population history (1981–2016)
Year	Pop.	±%
1981	425	—
1986	383	−9.9%
1991	373	−2.6%
1996	331	−11.3%
2001	304	−8.2%
2006	281	−7.6%
2011	272	−3.2%
2016	263	−3.3%
Source: Statistics Canada via Saskatchewan Bureau of Statistics

In the 2021 Census of Population conducted by Statistics Canada, Neudorf had a population of 272 living in 132 of its 161 total private dwellings, a change of 3.4% from its 2016 population of 263. With a land area of 1.94 km^{2} (0.75 sq mi), it had a population density of 140.2/km^{2} (363.1/sq mi) in 2021.

In the 2016 Census of Population, the Village of Neudorf recorded a population of 263 living in 138 of its 167 total private dwellings, a −3.4% change from its 2011 population of 272. With a land area of 2.05 km^{2} (0.79 sq mi), it had a population density of 128.3/km^{2} (332.3/sq mi) in 2016.

== Notable people ==
- Dick Assman - Petro-Canada employee, known for appearing on the Late Show with David Letterman
- Doreen Kimura - Professor at Simon Fraser University, winner of the Kistler Prize
- Ed Litzenberger - NHL hockey player
- Brian Propp - NHL hockey player
- Percy Saltzman - First English-speaking Weatherman in Canada
- Jarret Stoll - NHL hockey player
- Henry Taube - Won the Nobel Prize in Chemistry
