= Aneroid =

Aneroid may refer to:

- Something devoid of liquid
- The village of Aneroid, Saskatchewan
- A type of barometer operated by the movement of the elastic lid of a box exhausted of air
