= Dysart, Saskatchewan =

Village in Saskatchewan, Canada

Dysart
- Village
- Village of Dysart
- Location of Dysart in Saskatchewan Dysart (Canada)
- Coordinates: 50.942°N 104.036°W
- Country: Canada
- Province: Saskatchewan
- Region: Central
- Census division: 6
- Rural Municipality: Lipton No. 217
- Incorporated (Village): April 6, 1909

Government
  - Type: Municipal
  - Governing body: Dysart Village Council
  - Mayor: Brenda Macknak
  - Administrator: Bonnie Moleski

Area
  - Total: 1.19 km^{2} (0.46 sq mi)

Population (2021)
  - Total: 188
  - Density: 157.6/km^{2} (408/sq mi)
- Time zone: UTC-6 (CST)
- Postal code: S0G 1H0
- Area code: 306
- Highways: Highway 22 Highway 639
- Website: www.dysartsk.ca

Dysart (/ˈdaɪzɑːrt/; 2016 population: 200) is a village in the Canadian province of Saskatchewan within the Rural Municipality of Lipton No. 217 and Census Division No. 6. The village is located east of Cupar and northwest of Lipton. It is about 91 kilometres (57 mi) north of the city of Regina. The village was named for Dysart, Fife in Scotland.

== History ==
Dysart incorporated as a village on April 6, 1909.

== Demographics ==
Population history (1981–2021)
Year	Pop.	±%
1981	275	—
1986	259	−5.8%
1991	243	−6.2%
1996	240	−1.2%
2001	210	−12.5%
2006	198	−5.7%
2011	218	+10.1%
2016	200	−8.3%
2021	188	−6.0%
Source: Statistics Canada via Saskatchewan Bureau of Statistics

In the 2021 Census of Population conducted by Statistics Canada, Dysart had a population of 188 living in 90 of its 108 total private dwellings, a change of −6% from its 2016 population of 200. With a land area of 1.19 km^{2} (0.46 sq mi), it had a population density of 158.0/km^{2} (409.2/sq mi) in 2021.

In the 2016 Census of Population, the Village of Dysart recorded a population of 200 living in 97 of its 115 total private dwellings, a −9% change from its 2011 population of 218. With a land area of 1.19 km^{2} (0.46 sq mi), it had a population density of 168.1/km^{2} (435.3/sq mi) in 2016.

== See also ==
- List of communities in Saskatchewan
- List of villages in Saskatchewan
