= Highway Hockey League =

- Sport: Ice hockey
- Founded: 1965
- CEO: Gerry Tomkins
- No. of teams: 8
- Country: Canada
- Most recent champion: Lumsden Monarchs (2019)
- Most titles: Raymore Rockets (10)
- Website: HighwayHockey.ca

The Highway Hockey League was a men's senior ice hockey league sanctioned by Hockey Saskatchewan and Hockey Canada.

== History ==
The league was formed in 1965 with five teams in Bulyea, Drake, Govan, Lumsden, and Strasbourg. Many teams have come and gone throughout the history of the league. Twenty-three towns have had teams in the league at one point. Teams compete for the HHL Robert Schultz Trophy and SHA Provincial championships.

The Lumsden Monarchs won the Robert Schultz Trophpy eleven times, which is the most of any team.

For the 2022-23 season, the league merged with the Qu'Appelle Valley Hockey League and played the season under the QVHL banner.

== Teams ==
Team	League titles	Provincial titles
Avonlea Arrows	4	2005, 2014 'D'
Bethune Bulldogs	5	2016 'A'
Cupar Canucks	3	2013, 1994 'A'
Lumsden Monarchs	11	1968, 1975, 1978, 1979 'C'; 1998 'B'
Raymore Rockets	10	1980, 1988, 1997 'C'; 2001 'A'
Southey Marlins **	5	1999, 2004 'A'
Strasbourg Maroons	4	1976, 1977 'C'
Wynyard Monarchs	2	2014 'A'

** = currently on hiatus

=== Former teams ===
- Craik Warriors
- Davidson Cyclones - 1989 Provincial 'C' champs; 2010, 2011 Provincial 'D' champs
- Drake Canucks - 1974, 1976, 1978, 1990, 1994, 1995, 1996, 2013 Provincial 'D' champs; 2005, 2010 Provincial 'C' champs; 2012 Provincial 'B' champs
- Dysart Blues - 1987 Provincial 'A' champs
- Govan/Semans Clippers
- Indian Head Chiefs
- Ipsco Steelers/Regina Molson Exports - 1984 Provincial 'A' champs
- Liberty/Imperial
- Moose Jaw
- Piapot
- Regina Molson Canadians
- Regina Mustangs/Voyageurs
- Rouleau Ramblers
- Semans Wheat Kings
- Strasbourg Lions/Mountaineers
- Westridge Bruins
- Wilcox

== Champions ==
Season	Playoff winner	League Pennant winner
1967	Drake Canucks	Drake Canucks
1968	Strasbourg Lions	Regina Mustangs
1969	Regina Mustangs	Strasbourg Lions
1970	Regina Voyageurs	Strasbourg Lions
1971	Craik Warriors	Strasbourg Mountaineers
1972	Bethune Bulldogs	Regina Molson Canadians
1973	Molson Canadians	Regina Molson Canadians
1974	Bethune Bulldogs	Strasbourg Maroons
1975	Strasbourg Maroons	Davidson Cyclones
1976	Ipsco Steelers	Strasbourg Maroons
1977	Lumsden Monarchs	Ipsco Steelers
1978	Strasbourg Maroons	Lumsden Monarchs
1979	Craik Warriors	Strasbourg Maroons
1980	Raymore Rockets	Raymore Rockets
1981	Molson Exports	Regina Molson Exports
1982	Westridge Bruins	Regina Molson Exports
1983	Raymore Rockets	Davidson Cyclones
1984	Raymore Rockets	Raymore Rockets
1985	Lumsden Monarchs	Lumsden Monarchs
1986	Dysart Blues	Dysart Blues
1987	Dysart Blues	Lumsden Monarchs
1988	Raymore Rockets	Raymore Rockets
1989	Govan/Semans Clippers	Raymore Rockets
1990	Raymore Rockets	Raymore Rockets
1991	Lumsden Monarchs	Southey Marlins
1992	Southey Marlins	Southey Marlins
1993	Southey Marlins	Southey Marlins
1994	Raymore Rockets	Raymore Rockets
1995	Cupar Canucks	Govan/Semans Clippers
1996	Cupar Canucks	Cupar Canucks
1997	Raymore Rockets	Cupar Canucks
1998	Strasbourg Maroons	Lumsden Monarchs
1999	Lumsden Monarchs	Raymore Rockets
2000	Raymore Rockets	Cupar Canucks
2001	Lumsden Monarchs	Lumsden Monarchs
2002	Lumsden Monarchs	Raymore Rockets
2003	Raymore Rockets	Cupar Canucks
2004	Southey Marlins	Southey Marlins
2005	Avonlea Arrows	Southey Marlins
2006	Southey Marlins	Wynyard Monarchs
2007	Avonlea Arrows	Cupar Canucks
2008	Wynyard Monarchs	Bethune Bulldogs
2009	Avonlea Arrows	Southey Marlins
2010	Southey Marlins	Raymore Rockets
2011	Raymore Rockets	Wynyard Monarchs
2012	Avonlea Arrows	Strasbourg Maroons
2013	Cupar Canucks	Cupar Canucks
2014	Wynyard Monarchs	Avonlea Arrows
2015	Bethune Bulldogs	Bethune Bulldogs
2016	Bethune Bulldogs	Bethune Bulldogs
2017	Bethune Bulldogs	Bethune Bulldogs
2018	Bethune Bulldogs	Bethune Bulldogs
2019	Lumsden Monarchs	Lumsden Monarchs
2020	Lumsden Monarchs	Raymore Rockets
2022	Lumsden Monarchs	Balcarres Broncs
2023	Balcarres Broncs	Grenfell Spitfires
2024	Lumsden Monarchs	Balcarres Broncs
2025	Lumsden Monarchs	Raymore Rockets

== See also ==
- List of ice hockey leagues
- Big 6 Hockey League
- Sport in Saskatchewan#Team sports
