= Neelby =

Coordinates: 50°05′21″N 102°39′58″W

Neelby is an unincorporated community within the Rural Municipality of Kingsley No. 124, Saskatchewan, Canada. The community is located 2.5 km south and west of the town of Kippling on Township Road 133, (50.090517, -102.673788). Very little remains of the community. Only two grain elevators and a few acreages remain.

== See also ==
- List of communities in Saskatchewan
