= Dick Assman =

Canadian gas station employee and television personality (1934–2016)

- Born: Richard Arthur Assman; February 14, 1934; Neudorf, Saskatchewan, Canada
- Died: August 15, 2016 (aged 82); Regina, Saskatchewan, Canada
- Occupation: Gas station employee
- Known for: Appearances on the Late Show with David Letterman
- Parents: Adolf Assman (father); Elizabeth Assman (mother)

Richard Arthur Assman (February 14, 1934 – August 15, 2016) was a Canadian gas station employee whose name propelled him to celebrity status across North America for four months in 1995.

== Career ==
In 1995, Assman moved from working at one Petro-Canada station to another. The latter station's owner took out an advertisement in the local newspaper that was sent anonymously to David Letterman, who was amused by Assman's name. Assman was introduced on July 24, 1995, on the Late Show with David Letterman, where he was a nightly feature for about a month. During this time, he was known as "Assman the Gasman".

Live field units in Canada interviewed him for the show. Over the weeks, Joe Namath declared himself an "Ass-maniac", while Assman received a musical tribute from Tony Orlando on Letterman:

Northgate Petro-Canada
Oh, they're relocating
Their new office at Victoria Square
They're celebrating
Oh vaya con dios, Dick Assman
Vaya con dios, my love

As his fame grew, Vancouver polling company Angus Reid Public Opinion reported that 49 percent of surveyed Canadians in September 1995 had heard of his name. He received a request to judge a bikini contest in August 1995 for the Janetville Jamboree and Truck Pull in Janetville, Ontario. "Assmania" came to a close in August when Assman visited the Ed Sullivan Theater and was presented with a bouquet of roses by Letterman.

In October 1995, James Blanchard, the U.S. ambassador to Canada, paid a visit to Assman at his gas station, citing his status as "an international celebrity".

Dick Assman himself, who took all this ribbing good-naturedly, pronounced his name "oss-man".

== Personal life ==
Assman was born in Neudorf, Saskatchewan, to Adolf and Elizabeth Assman. He died on August 15, 2016.
