= Lemberg, Saskatchewan =

Town in Saskatchewan, Canada

Lemberg
- Town
- Nickname: Community In Motion
- Location of Lemberg in Saskatchewan Lemberg (Canada)
- Coordinates: 50.732°N 103.195°W
- Country: Canada
- Province: Saskatchewan
- Census division: No. 5
- Rural Municipality: McLeod No. 185
- Post office established: 1904
- Village Incorporated: July 12, 1904
- Town Incorporated: September 1, 1907

Government
  - Mayor: Murray Clarke
  - Governing body: Lemberg Town Council

Area
  - Land: 2.67 km^{2} (1.03 sq mi)
- Elevation: 614 m (2,014 ft)

Population (2016)
  - Total: 313
  - Density: 102.7/km^{2} (266/sq mi)
- Time zone: CST
- Postal code: S0A 2B0
- Area code: 306
- Highways: Highway 22 / Highway 617
- Website: Town of Lemberg

Lemberg is a town in Saskatchewan, Canada. It was founded by ethnic German and Ukrainian immigrants from Lviv (Austria-Hungary, now Ukraine), for which the German name was "Lemberg", as part of the Great Economic Emigration away from Galicia and Lodomeria starting in the mid to late-1800s.

== History ==
The first post office opened on July 15, 1904.

== Demographics ==
In the 2021 Census of Population conducted by Statistics Canada, Lemberg had a population of 266 living in 130 of its 153 total private dwellings, a change of −15% from its 2016 population of 313. With a land area of 2.67 km^{2} (1.03 sq mi), it had a population density of 99.6/km^{2} (258.0/sq mi) in 2021.

== Religion ==
As of 2011, Lemberg was home to four places of worship: Saint Michael's Roman Catholic Church, Trinity Lutheran Church, Grace United Church, and the Pentecostal Assembly. A Baptist church once stood just south of Lemberg, but as of 2011 all that remained was the cemetery.

== Education ==
Lemberg is the home of North Valley High School (grades 7-12). North Valley Elementary School (grades K-6) is located in the neighbouring town of Neudorf.

== Points of interest ==
- Historic Sites
  - Weissenberg Roman Catholic Public School #49
  - Saint Michael's Roman Catholic Church
  - Pool Grain Elevator
  - Trinity Lutheran Church
  - War Memorial Cenotaph
- Recreational Facilities
  - Lemberg Baseball Park
  - Town Campgrounds
  - Lemberg Rink (Skating and Curling)
  - Community Hall Complex (5 pin Bowling, Pool, Foosball table, Shuffleboard, Table Tennis, Snack Bar)
  - Lemberg Lions' Playground
  - Walking Trails and Mercy Grotto

== Notable people ==
- James Garfield Gardiner, premier of Saskatchewan 1926–1929 and 1934–1935.

== See also ==
- List of communities in Saskatchewan
- List of towns in Saskatchewan
- Lemberg Airport
