= Wishart, Saskatchewan =

Community in Saskatchewan, Canada

Coordinates: 51.548°N 103.979°W

Wishart is a hamlet in the Rural Municipality of Emerald No. 277 in Saskatchewan, Canada. It is listed as a designated place by Statistics Canada. The hamlet had a population of 95 in the Canada 2006 Census. It previously held the status of village until January 1, 2002. The hamlet is located 32 kilometres (20 mi) southwest of the village of Elfros at the intersection of Highway 639 and Highway 743.

== History ==
Prior to January 1, 2002, Wishart was incorporated as a village, and was restructured as a hamlet under the jurisdiction of the RM of Emerald No. 277 on that date.

== Demographics ==
In the 2021 Census of Population conducted by Statistics Canada, Wishart had a population of 50 living in 30 of its 35 total private dwellings, a change of −28.6% from its 2016 population of 70. With a land area of 0.66 km^{2} (0.25 sq mi), it had a population density of 75.8/km^{2} (196.2/sq mi) in 2021.

== See also ==
- List of communities in Saskatchewan
- List of hamlets in Saskatchewan
