= Rural Municipality of Kingsley No. 124 =

Rural municipality in Saskatchewan, Canada

Kingsley No. 124
- Rural municipality
- Rural Municipality of Kingsley No. 124
- Location of the RM of Kingsley No. 124 in Saskatchewan
- Coordinates: 50.217°N 102.550°W
- Country: Canada
- Province: Saskatchewan
- Census division: 5
- SARM division: 1
- Federal riding: Souris—Moose Mountain
- Provincial riding: Moosomin
- Formed: December 12, 1910

Government
  - Reeve: Gordon Sproat
  - Governing body: RM of Kingsley No. 124 Council
  - Administrator: Holly Heikkila
  - Office location: Kipling

Area (2016)
  - Land: 844.06 km^{2} (325.89 sq mi)

Population (2016)
  - Total: 444
  - Density: 0.5/km^{2} (1.3/sq mi)
- Time zone: CST
  - Summer (DST): CST
- Postal code: S0G 2S0
- Area codes: 306 and 639

The Rural Municipality of Kingsley No. 124 (2016 population: 444) is a rural municipality (RM) in the Canadian province of Saskatchewan within Census Division No. 5 and SARM Division No. 1. It is located in the southeast portion of the province.

== History ==
The RM of Kingsley No. 124 incorporated as a rural municipality on December 12, 1910.

Heritage properties

There are three historical properties located within the RM.

- Coronation Community Cairn - This commemorative monument built in 1978 recognizes the early pioneers in the region who helped build the one-room Coronation School in 1913. The monument is located nine kilometers northeast of Windthorst.
- Highland Baptist Church (previously called the Swedish Baptist Church) - This church was constructed in 1924 by early Swedish immigrants. Regular services were held from 1924 until 1970. The church still holds the occasional special service or event. The church also has a cemetery on the property. The building is located twelve kilometers north of the Town of Kipling.
- Poplar Grove United Church - This church was constructed in 1902, and is located ten kilometers southeast of the Town of Broadview. The church is constructed of field stone and has nine stained-glass windows. Regular services were held from 1902 until 1970. The cemetery dates back to 1887. Today the site is used for public events and the occasional special service.
- Zion Lutheran Church - This country church was constructed in 1926, and is located eight kilometers north of Windthorst.

== Geography ==
=== Communities and localities ===
The following urban municipalities are surrounded by the RM.

Towns

- Kipling

The following unincorporated communities are within the RM.

Localities

- Bender
- Inchkeith
- Neelby

== Demographics ==
Population history (1981–2016)
Year	Pop.	±%
1981	683	—
1986	694	+1.6%
1991	584	−15.9%
1996	524	−10.3%
2001	491	−6.3%
2006	439	−10.6%
2011	421	−4.1%
2016	444	+5.5%
Source: Statistics Canada via Saskatchewan Bureau of Statistics

In the 2021 Census of Population conducted by Statistics Canada, the RM of Kingsley No. 124 had a population of 396 living in 163 of its 198 total private dwellings, a change of −10.8% from its 2016 population of 444. With a land area of 828.77 km^{2} (319.99 sq mi), it had a population density of 0.5/km^{2} (1.2/sq mi) in 2021.

In the 2016 Census of Population, the RM of Kingsley No. 124 recorded a population of 444 living in 179 of its 188 total private dwellings, a 5.5% change from its 2011 population of 421. With a land area of 844.06 km^{2} (325.89 sq mi), it had a population density of 0.5/km^{2} (1.4/sq mi) in 2016.

== Government ==
The RM of Kingsley No. 124 is governed by an elected municipal council and an appointed administrator that meets on the second Tuesday of every month. The reeve of the RM is Gordon Sproat while its administrator is Holly Heikkila. The RM's office is located in Kipling.

== Transportation ==
Kipling Airport is located within the rural municipality.
