= Feathertick Inn =

- Interactive map of the Feathertick Inn area

General information
- Architectural style: Queen Anne Revival
- Location: Estevan No. 5, Saskatchewan, Canada
- Coordinates: 49.0143°N 102.823°W
- Construction started: 1911
- Client: John Horne

The Feathertick Inn is a designated historic building located in the Rural Municipality of Estevan No. 5, Saskatchewan, Canada. The property contains a three-story building in a Queen Anne Revival style, made of wood. The home was frequently visited by W. O. Mitchell who was a relative of the Adolphes family that lived in the home from 1930 until the 1980s.
