= Aneroid, Saskatchewan =

Community in Saskatchewan, Canada

Aneroid
- Special service area
- Special Service Area of Aneroid
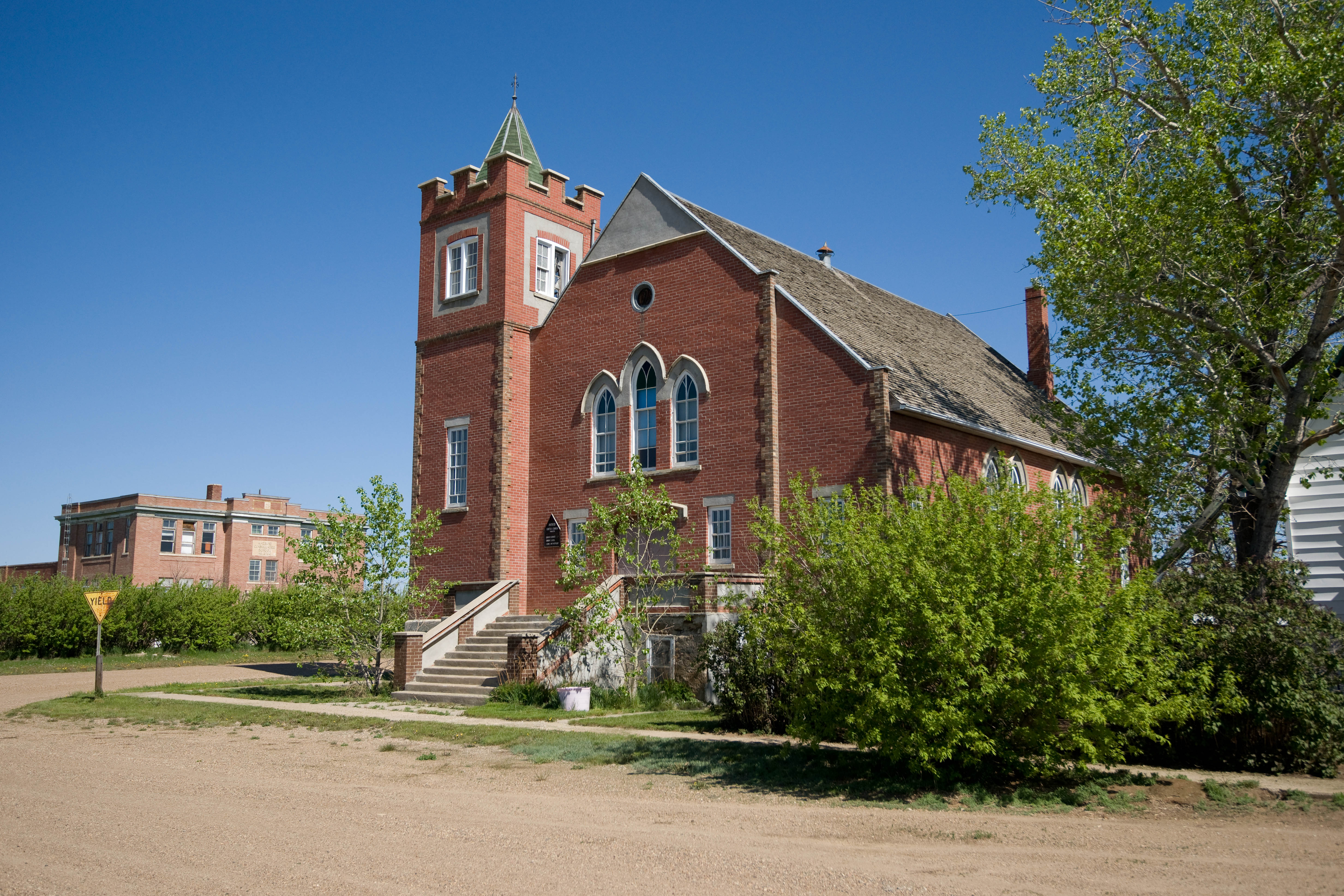
- Aneroid United Church

- Location in Saskatchewan Aneroid (Saskatchewan) Aneroid (Canada)
- Coordinates: 49.7155°N 107.2971°W
- Country: Canada
- Province: Saskatchewan
- Region: Saskatchewan
- Census division: 4
- Rural Municipality: Auvergne No. 76
- Post office Founded: February 1, 1911
- Village established: N/A
- Restructured (special service area): December 31, 2008

Government
  - Former Mayor: Elton Meikle
  - Former Administrator: Marcel Gervais
  - Governing body: RM of Auvergne No. 76
  - MLA for Wood River: Dave Marit
  - M.P. for Cypress Hills-Grasslands: Jeremy Patzer

Area
  - Total: 1.05 km^{2} (0.41 sq mi)

Population (2016)
  - Total: 50
  - Density: 47.5/km^{2} (123/sq mi)
- Time zone: CST
- Postal code: S0N 0C0
- Area code: 306
- Highways: Highway 13 (Red Coat Trail / Ghost Town Trail) / Highway 609
- Railways: Great Western Railway

Aneroid (2016 population 50) is a special service area in the Rural Municipality of Auvergne No. 76 in southwestern Saskatchewan, Canada. The community is approximately 70 kilometres (43 mi) southeast of Swift Current at the intersection of Highway 13 (Red Coat Trail / Ghost Town Trail) and Highway 609.

== History ==
Prior to December 31, 2008, Aneroid was incorporated as a village, and was restructured as a special service area under the jurisdiction of the RM of Auvergne No. 76 on that date.

== Demographics ==
In the 2021 Census of Population conducted by Statistics Canada, Aneroid had a population of 25 living in 16 of its 32 total private dwellings, a change of −50% from its 2016 population of 50. With a land area of 0.97 km^{2} (0.37 sq mi), it had a population density of 25.8/km^{2} (66.8/sq mi) in 2021.

Canada census – Aneroid, Saskatchewan community profile

	2016	2011
Population	50 (+25.0% from 2011)	40 (-11.1% from 2006)
Land area	1.05 km^{2} (0.41 sq mi)	1.05 km^{2} (0.41 sq mi)
Population density	47.5/km^{2} (123/sq mi)	38.0/km^{2} (98/sq mi)
Median age	44.5 (M: 44.4, F: 44.6)	Not Available (M: Not Available, F: Not Available)
Private dwellings	33 (total)	30 (total)
Median household income	$Not Available	$Not Available

References: 2016 2011

== History ==
The most popular version of the origin of the name is that the first survey party lost its aneroid barometer on the present townsite. Many of the streets in the village are named after surveyor's instruments.

The post office was established as Val Blair on February 1, 1911, and renamed Aneroid on December 1, 1913. Formerly a village, Aneroid was restructured as a special service area on December 31, 2008, under the administration of R.M. Auvergne No. 76.

Significant remaining historic buildings in the community include the 1915 Public School and the 1926 United Church. The two-storey, brick Public School was designed by Stanley Edgar Storey, one of the most significant architects in Saskatchewan; it operated from 1915 to 1997. The red-brick church was designed by architect Charles Nicholson and built in 1926.

== Infrastructure ==
- Saskatchewan Transportation Company used to provide intercity bus service to Aneroid; however, these operations were ceased in 2017.
- Great Western Railway

== Notable residents ==
- Patrick Marleau, retired NHL hockey player

== Climate ==
Climate data for Aneroid (1981-2010)
Month	Jan	Feb	Mar	Apr	May	Jun	Jul	Aug	Sep	Oct	Nov	Dec	Year
Record high °C (°F)	14.4 (57.9)	19.0 (66.2)	22.8 (73.0)	32.2 (90.0)	37.5 (99.5)	43.3 (109.9)	41.1 (106.0)	41.1 (106.0)	38.0 (100.4)	32.2 (90.0)	23.0 (73.4)	20.6 (69.1)	43.3 (109.9)
Mean daily maximum °C (°F)	−4.5 (23.9)	−1.4 (29.5)	4.5 (40.1)	13.1 (55.6)	19.1 (66.4)	23.7 (74.7)	27.2 (81.0)	27.2 (81.0)	20.1 (68.2)	12.5 (54.5)	2.7 (36.9)	−3.6 (25.5)	11.7 (53.1)
Daily mean °C (°F)	−10.3 (13.5)	−7.3 (18.9)	−1.5 (29.3)	5.7 (42.3)	11.5 (52.7)	16.2 (61.2)	19.1 (66.4)	18.9 (66.0)	12.4 (54.3)	5.7 (42.3)	−3.0 (26.6)	−9.2 (15.4)	4.9 (40.8)
Mean daily minimum °C (°F)	−16.0 (3.2)	−13.2 (8.2)	−7.5 (18.5)	−1.8 (28.8)	4.0 (39.2)	8.8 (47.8)	11.0 (51.8)	10.5 (50.9)	4.7 (40.5)	−1.2 (29.8)	−8.6 (16.5)	−14.9 (5.2)	−2.0 (28.4)
Record low °C (°F)	−47.2 (−53.0)	−46.1 (−51.0)	−36.1 (−33.0)	−29.4 (−20.9)	−13.3 (8.1)	−7.2 (19.0)	0 (32)	−3.3 (26.1)	−12.8 (9.0)	−25.0 (−13.0)	−35.0 (−31.0)	−47.0 (−52.6)	−47.2 (−53.0)
Average precipitation mm (inches)	18.6 (0.73)	11.0 (0.43)	22.1 (0.87)	20.7 (0.81)	53.8 (2.12)	66.1 (2.60)	62.9 (2.48)	39.9 (1.57)	38.0 (1.50)	20.1 (0.79)	15.0 (0.59)	16.9 (0.67)	385.2 (15.17)
Source: Environment Canada

== See also ==
- List of communities in Saskatchewan
- List of hamlets in Saskatchewan
