= Rural Municipality of Auvergne No. 76 =

Rural municipality in Saskatchewan, Canada

Auvergne No. 76
- Rural municipality
- Rural Municipality of Auvergne No. 76

- Location of the RM of Auvergne No. 76 in Saskatchewan
- Coordinates: 49.661°N 107.439°W
- Country: Canada
- Province: Saskatchewan
- Census division: 3
- SARM division: 3
- Federal riding: Cypress Hills—Grasslands
- Provincial riding: Wood River
- Formed: January 1, 1913

Government
  - Reeve: Richard Marleau
  - Governing body: RM of Auvergne No. 76 Council
  - Administrator: Sandra Krushelniski
  - Office location: Ponteix

Area (2016)
  - Land: 854.46 km^{2} (329.91 sq mi)

Population (2016)
  - Total: 412
  - Density: 0.5/km^{2} (1.3/sq mi)
- Time zone: CST
  - Summer (DST): CST
- Postal code: S0N 1Z0
- Area codes: 306 and 639

The Rural Municipality of Auvergne No. 76 (2016 population: 412) is a rural municipality (RM) in the Canadian province of Saskatchewan within Census Division No. 3 and SARM Division No. 3.

== History ==
The RM of Auvergne No. 76 incorporated as a rural municipality on January 1, 1913.

Heritage properties

There are four historical properties within the RM.

- Napao Site - (Also called Archaeological Site DkNv-2) is an archaeological site, with pre-contact remains. The site is located 10 km west of Ponteix
- Niska Site - (Also called Archaeological Site DkNv-3) is an archaeological site, with pre-contact remains. The site is located 8 km south-east of Ponteix
- Pinto River School - (Now called the Pinto River Community Centre) is a 1915 one-room school house, located 14,5 km south of the village of Aneroid. The building operated as a one-room school house from 1915 until 1958. Since closing as a school the building has been used as a community centre.
- Tillet Hills - (Also called Archaeological Site DkNv-27 to 30, 36) is an archaeological site, with pre-contact remains. The site is located along the Notukeu Creek valley 5 km north-east of Ponteix

== Demographics ==
Population history (1981–2016)
| Year | Pop. | ±% |
|---|---|---|
| 1981 | 550 | — |
| 1986 | 497 | −9.6% |
| 1991 | 447 | −10.1% |
| 1996 | 430 | −3.8% |
| 2001 | 355 | −17.4% |
| 2006 | 329 | −7.3% |
| 2011 | 354 | +7.6% |
| 2016 | 412 | +16.4% |
Source: Statistics Canada via Saskatchewan Bureau of Statistics

In the 2021 Census of Population conducted by Statistics Canada, the RM of Auvergne No. 76 had a population of 381 living in 105 of its 132 total private dwellings, a change of −7.5% from its 2016 population of 412. With a land area of 846.86 km^{2} (326.97 sq mi), it had a population density of 0.4/km^{2} (1.2/sq mi) in 2021.

In the 2016 Census of Population, the RM of Auvergne No. 76 recorded a population of 412 living in 118 of its 141 total private dwellings, a 16.4% change from its 2011 population of 354. With a land area of 854.46 km^{2} (329.91 sq mi), it had a population density of 0.5/km^{2} (1.2/sq mi) in 2016.

== Government ==
The RM of Auvergne No. 76 is governed by an elected municipal council and an appointed administrator that meets on the second Thursday of every month. The reeve of the RM is Richard Marleau while its administrator is Sandra Krushelniski. The RM's office is located in Ponteix.

== See also ==
- List of francophone communities in Saskatchewan
