= Rural Municipality of Lipton No. 217 =

Rural municipality in Saskatchewan, Canada

Lipton No. 217
- Rural municipality
- Rural Municipality of Lipton No. 217
- Location of the RM of Lipton No. 217 in Saskatchewan
- Coordinates: 50.952°N 103.890°W
- Country: Canada
- Province: Saskatchewan
- Census division: 6
- SARM division: 1
- Formed: December 11, 1911

Government
  - Reeve: Corey Senft
  - Governing body: RM of Lipton No. 217 Council
  - Administrator: Frank Kosa
  - Office location: Lipton

Area (2016)
  - Land: 813.69 km^{2} (314.17 sq mi)

Population (2016)
  - Total: 381
  - Density: 0.5/km^{2} (1.3/sq mi)
- Time zone: CST
  - Summer (DST): CST
- Area codes: 306 and 639

The Rural Municipality of Lipton No. 217 (2016 population: 381) is a rural municipality (RM) in the Canadian province of Saskatchewan within Census Division No. 6 and SARM Division No. 1.

== History ==
The RM of Lipton No. 217 incorporated as a rural municipality on December 11, 1911.

Heritage properties

There are three historical sites located within the RM.

- Hayward School – Constructed in 1904–1952, the site contains a one-room school house and barns.
- Lipton Jewish Cemetery – Established in 1902, the cemetery is the resting place for early Jewish immigrants.
- Tomecko House – Constructed in 1917–18, by Mr. Stephen Tomecko, the house served as a gathering place for dances after harvest.

=== Fort Qu'Appelle-Touchwood Hills Trail ===
A section of the Carlton Trail from the Touchwood Hills to the Fishing Lakes in Qu'Appelle Valley was called the Fort Qu'Appelle-Touchwood Hills Trail and a portion of it passed through the RM of Lipton No. 217. The route was used regularly by traders, settlers, Métis, and First Nations from the 1850s until 1890 when the railway came through the area. The Dominion Telegraph line was built alongside the trail. In 1885 General Frederick Middleton used this trail with his column of militia en route to Batoche, Saskatchewan during the North-West Rebellion. After the completion of the railway, the trail continued to be used by locals. Eventually, though, with the introduction of the automobile, the trail, and many others like it, fell into disuse and were often ploughed over.

A section of the Fort Qu'Appelle-Touchwood Hills Trail is commemorated as a historic site alongside Highway 35 north of the town of Fort Qu'Appelle in the RM of Lipton No. 217. The site has a cairn and is .13 ha (0.32 acres) in size. Ruts from the Red River carts can still be seen in the prairie grass by the site.

== Geography ==
=== Communities and localities ===
The following urban municipalities are surrounded by the RM.

Villages

It also surrounds the Village of Dysart.

== Demographics ==
Population history (1981–2016)
Year	Pop.	±%
1981	686	—
1986	661	−3.6%
1991	607	−8.2%
1996	533	−12.2%
2001	512	−3.9%
2006	427	−16.6%
2011	424	−0.7%
2016	381	−10.1%
Source: Statistics Canada via Saskatchewan Bureau of Statistics

In the 2021 Census of Population conducted by Statistics Canada, the RM of Lipton No. 217 had a population of 388 living in 168 of its 191 total private dwellings, a change of 1.8% from its 2016 population of 381. With a land area of 805.35 km^{2} (310.95 sq mi), it had a population density of 0.5/km^{2} (1.2/sq mi) in 2021.

In the 2016 Census of Population, the RM of Lipton No. 217 recorded a population of 381 living in 158 of its 189 total private dwellings, a −10.1% change from its 2011 population of 424. With a land area of 813.69 km^{2} (314.17 sq mi), it had a population density of 0.5/km^{2} (1.2/sq mi) in 2016.

== Government ==
The RM of Lipton No. 217 is governed by an elected municipal council and an appointed administrator that meets on the first Tuesday of every month. The reeve of the RM is Corey Senft while its administrator is Frank Kosa. The RM's office is located in Lipton.

== See also ==
- List of historic places in rural municipalities of Saskatchewan
