= Killaly, Saskatchewan =

Village in Saskatchewan, Canada

Killaly
- Village
- Village of Killaly
- Location of Killaly in Saskatchewan Killaly (Canada)
- Coordinates: 50.753°N 102.830°W
- Country: Canada
- Province: Saskatchewan
- Region: Southeast
- Census division: 5
- Rural Municipality: Grayson No. 184

Government
  - Type: Municipal
  - Governing body: Killaly Village Council Garnet Dixon, Leah Schrader
  - Administrator: Audrey Ulmer
  - MP: Cathay Wagantall
  - MLA: Warren Kaeding

Area
  - Total: 2.59 km^{2} (1.00 sq mi)

Population (2006)
  - Total: 77
  - Density: 29.7/km^{2} (77/sq mi)
- Time zone: UTC-6 (CST)
- Postal code: S0A 1X0
- Area code: 306
- Highways: Highway 22; Highway 47
- Railways: (Pulled)

Killaly (2016 population: 65) is a village in the Canadian province of Saskatchewan within the Rural Municipality of Grayson No. 184 and Census Division No. 5. The village is about 23 kilometres (14 mi) south of the city of Melville on Highway 47 at the intersection of Highway 22 and 47.

== History ==
Killaly incorporated as a village on April 28, 1909.

== Demographics ==
Population history (1981–2016)
Year	Pop.	±%
1981	112	—
1986	122	+8.9%
1991	103	−15.6%
1996	88	−14.6%
2001	91	+3.4%
2006	77	−15.4%
2011	74	−3.9%
2016	65	−12.2%
Source: Statistics Canada via Saskatchewan Bureau of Statistics

In the 2021 Census of Population conducted by Statistics Canada, Killaly had a population of 58 living in 27 of its 31 total private dwellings, a change of −10.8% from its 2016 population of 65. With a land area of 2.64 km^{2} (1.02 sq mi), it had a population density of 22.0/km^{2} (56.9/sq mi) in 2021.

In the 2016 Census of Population, the Village of Killaly recorded a population of 65 living in 28 of its 48 total private dwellings, a −13.8% change from its 2011 population of 74. With a land area of 2.59 km^{2} (1.00 sq mi), it had a population density of 25.1/km^{2} (65.0/sq mi) in 2016.

== Notable people ==
- Adam Exner, OMI (1928–2023), Roman Catholic Archbishop of Vancouver from 1991 to 2004

== See also ==
- List of communities in Saskatchewan
- List of villages in Saskatchewan
