= Markinch, Saskatchewan =

Village in Saskatchewan, Canada

Village of Markinch
- Village
- Location of Markinch in Saskatchewan Village of Markinch (Canada)
- Coordinates: 50.944°N 104.349°W
- Country: Canada
- Province: Saskatchewan
- Region: Saskatchewan
- Census division: 6
- Rural Municipality: Cupar No. 218
- Post office: 1906 - 1989
- Incorporated (Village): N/A
- Incorporated (Town): N/A

Government
  - Mayor: Robert Fenwick
  - Administrator: Rita T. Orb
  - Governing body: Markinch Village Council

Area
  - Total: 0.68 km^{2} (0.26 sq mi)
- Elevation: 610 m (2,000 ft)

Population (2016)
  - Total: 58
  - Density: 85.9/km^{2} (222/sq mi)
- Time zone: CST
- Postal code: S0G 3J0
- Area code: 306
- Highways: Saskatchewan_Highway_22
- Waterways: Loon Creek

Markinch (2016 population: 58) is a village in the Canadian province of Saskatchewan within the Rural Municipality of Cupar No. 218 and Census Division No. 6. It is located about 68 kilometres (42 mi) north of the city of Regina. It was named by settlers for Markinch, Scotland.

The first European settlers in the district were Paul Blaser and Tom Bradwell in 1900. The railway from Brandon, reached Markinch in 1905 and highway 22 was completed in 1930. Markinch was established with the coming of the railroad. The population in 1906/07 was 40 people and reached its height in 1921 with 175 people.

== History ==
Markinch incorporated as a village on February 16, 1911.

== Demographics ==
Population history (1981–2016)
Year	Pop.	±%
1981	80	—
1986	101	+26.2%
1991	81	−19.8%
1996	72	−11.1%
2001	67	−6.9%
2006	59	−11.9%
2011	72	+22.0%
2016	58	−19.4%
Source: Statistics Canada via Saskatchewan Bureau of Statistics

In the 2021 Census of Population conducted by Statistics Canada, Markinch had a population of 55 living in 26 of its 31 total private dwellings, a change of −5.2% from its 2016 population of 58. With a land area of 0.68 km^{2} (0.26 sq mi), it had a population density of 80.9/km^{2} (209.5/sq mi) in 2021.

In the 2016 Census of Population, the Village of Markinch recorded a population of 58 living in 29 of its 31 total private dwellings, a −24.1% change from its 2011 population of 72. With a land area of 0.68 km^{2} (0.26 sq mi), it had a population density of 85.3/km^{2} (220.9/sq mi) in 2016.

== See also ==
- List of communities in Saskatchewan
- List of villages in Saskatchewan
