= Southey, Saskatchewan =

Town in Saskatchewan, Canada

Southey
- Town
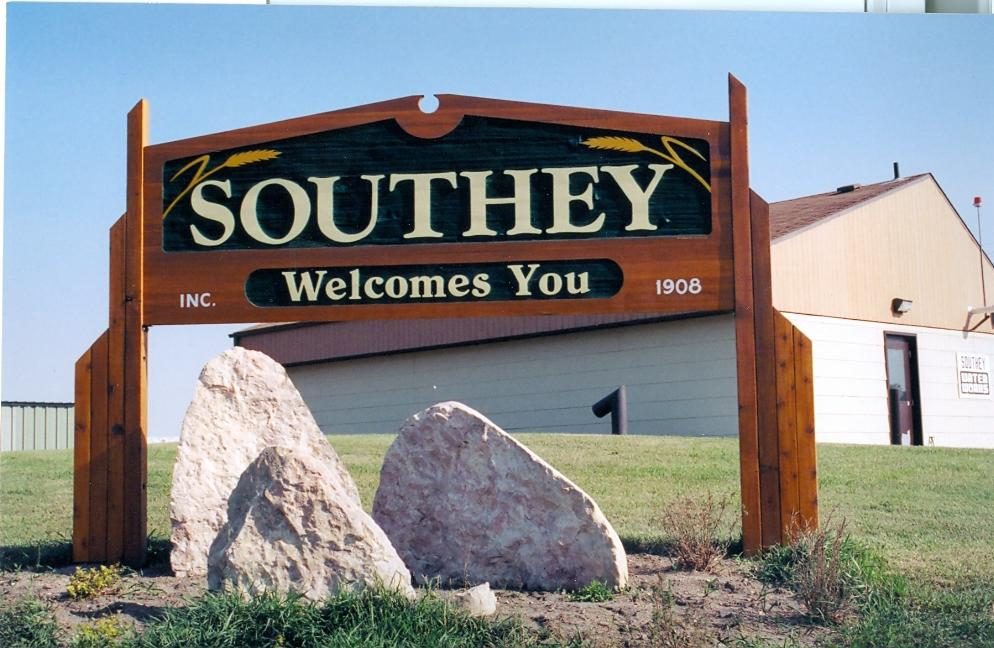
- Southey welcome sign

- Location of Southey in Saskatchewan Southey (Canada)
- Coordinates: 50.945°N 104.503°W
- Country: Canada
- Province: Saskatchewan
- Census division: 6
- Rural municipality: Cupar No. 218
- Post office Founded: 1905-10-16
- Incorporated (Village): 1907
- Incorporated (Town): 1980

Government
  - Type: Mayor and Council
  - Mayor: Greg Adelman
  - Administrator: Cindy Baumgartner

Area
  - Total: 1.56 km^{2} (0.60 sq mi)

Population (2021)
  - Total: 832
  - Density: 533.3/km^{2} (1,381/sq mi)
- Time zone: CST
- Postal code: S0G 4P0
- Area code: 306
- Highways: Highway 6 & Highway 22
- Waterways: Near the Qu'Appelle River
- Website: www.southey.ca

Southey is a town in the Canadian province of Saskatchewan. It is on Highway 6, approximately 55 kilometres (34 mi) north of Regina, the capital city of Saskatchewan.

Southey is named after a famous English poet, Robert Southey. Additionally, most of the streets of Southey are named after English and Scottish poets.

== History ==
The vast prairie land of the North-West Territories was opened for settlement during the latter part of the 1880s and 1890s. Prior to this, the whole area was home to the First Nations people and their culture. Settlement by Europeans and Americans followed the river valleys and then the westward movement of the railway.

The first early settlement in the Southey area consisted of ranchers north and south of the present townsite. H.B. Chandler, one of the first settlers, filed on land on the south side of town in 1903. When the railway arrived in the area, he applied for the site to be named "Southey", after Robert Southey, one of his favourite English poets.

From this point on, the town grew and developed with the appearance of the first stores, school, banks, elevators, barber shop, hardware and implement dealers, restaurants, lumber yard, telephone system, sidewalks, fire brigades, and others in the 1905 – 1912 period. This growth allowed Southey to be incorporated in 1907–08. Subsequently, streets were named after other British writers and poets, so it is possible to travel down streets named Keats, Browning, Burns, Byron, Coleridge, Frost, Kipling, Milton, and others.

In 1988 Southey celebrated its 80th anniversary and in 2008 the town had a 100th year celebration.

== Demographics ==
In the 2021 Census of Population conducted by Statistics Canada, Southey had a population of 832 living in 339 of its 356 total private dwellings, a change of 3.5% from its 2016 population of 804. With a land area of 1.56 km^{2} (0.60 sq mi), it had a population density of 533.3/km^{2} (1,381.3/sq mi) in 2021.

According to the 2011 census, Southey's median age was 39.9 years (males:37.4 yrs., females:42.0 yrs.) It had the median household income was $71,585.

== Sports and recreation ==
Southey has a curling rink, water spray park, nearby golf courses, and an ice rink at the Southey Communiplex. The Southey Marlins of the senior men's Highway Hockey League play there, except right now the team is on a hiatus.

== Education ==
The Robert Southey School is a K-12 school incorporating over 100 years of history. In 2006 Southey School celebrated its centenary.

== Churches ==
The people of Southey and District have four main centres for religious congregations:

- Southey Baptist Church
- Southey Emmanuel Lutheran Church
- Southey St James Roman Catholic Church
- Southey United Church

== Southey Cable ==
The Southey Cable Company was owned and operated by the Town of Southey. It is defunct; Access TV was provided as a substitute.

== Notable people ==
- Donna Kriekle, artist

== Gallery ==
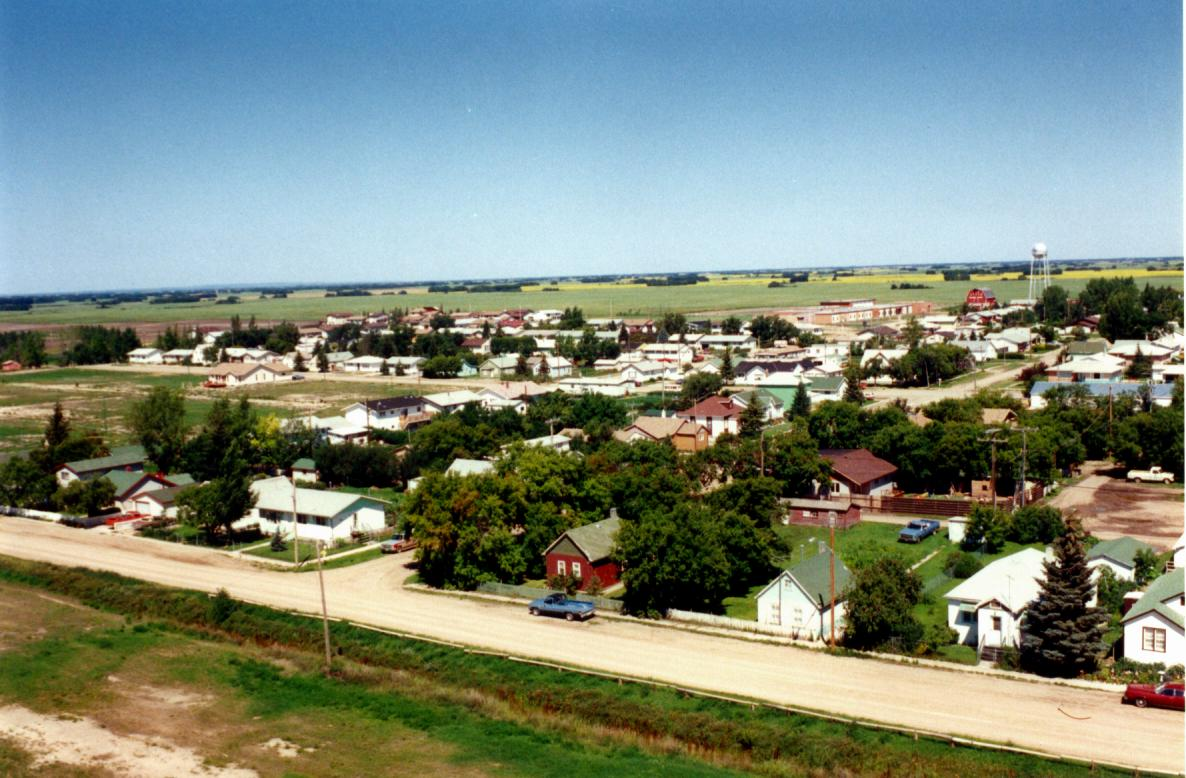
West side of Southey

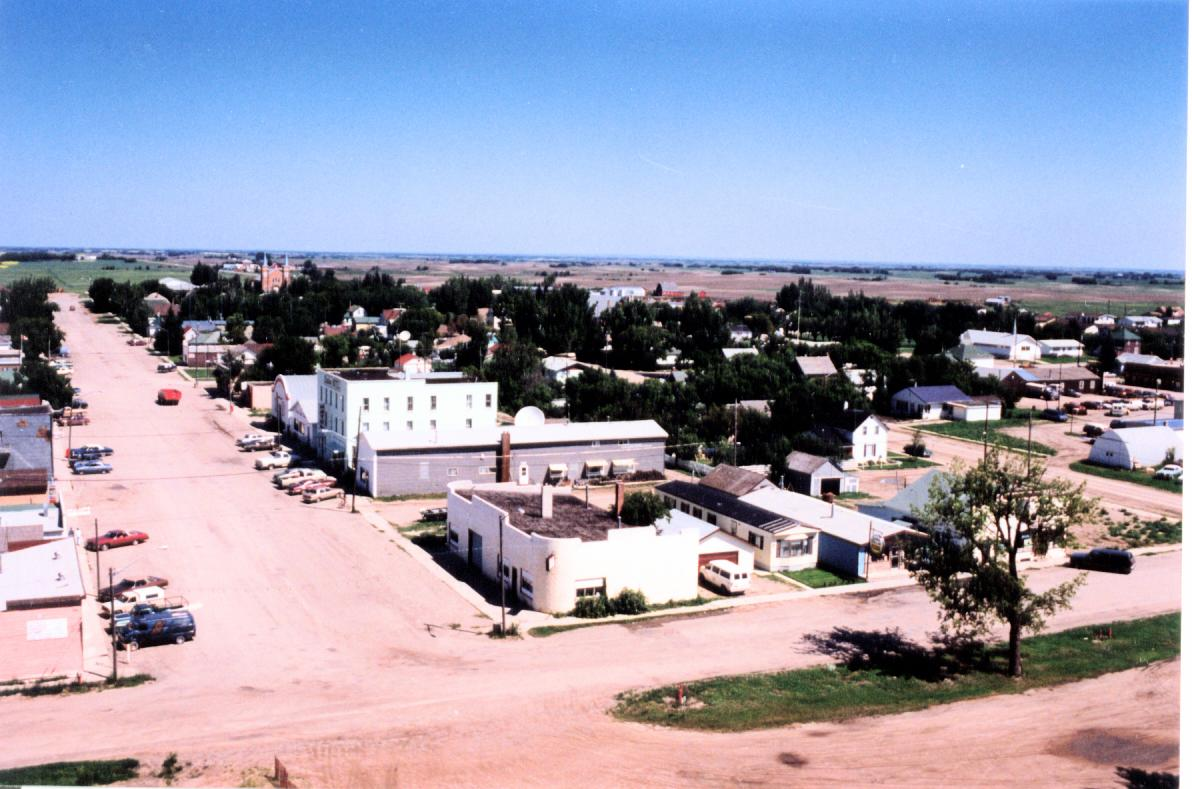
Southey, east of Main Street

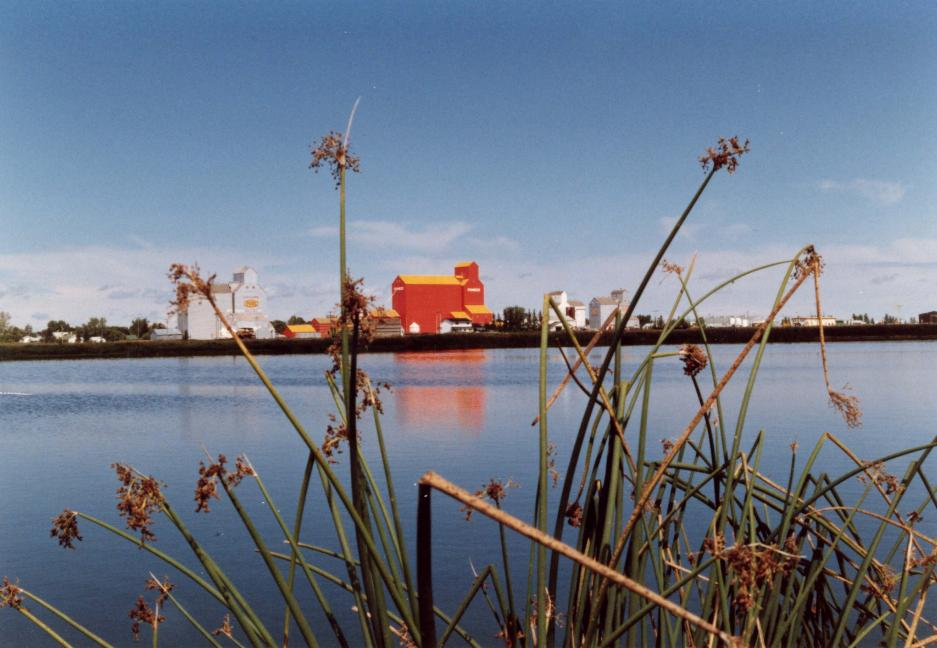
The elevators of Southey in 1987

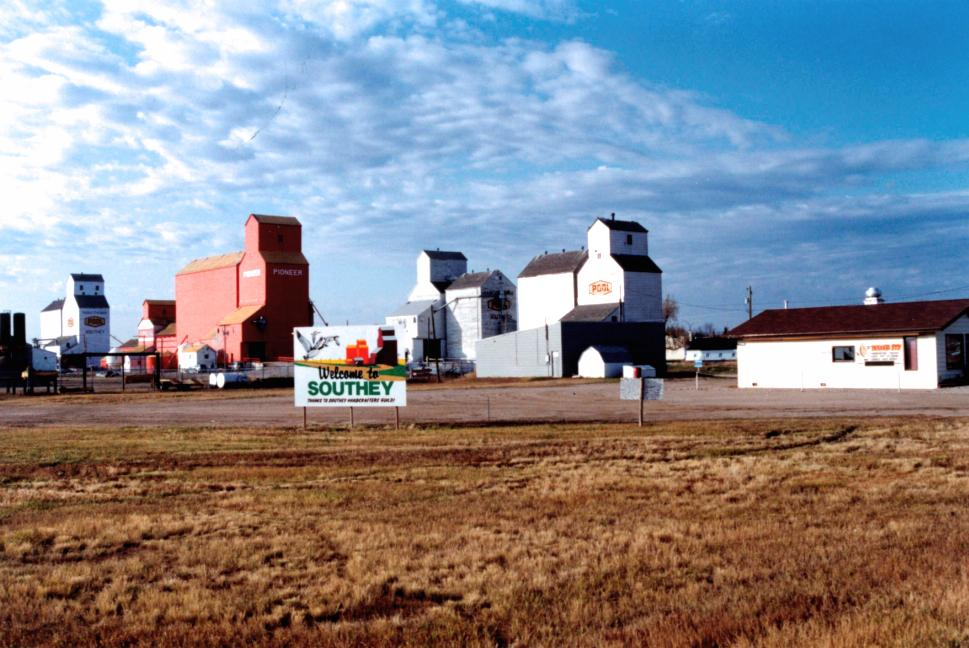
Elevators in 1992

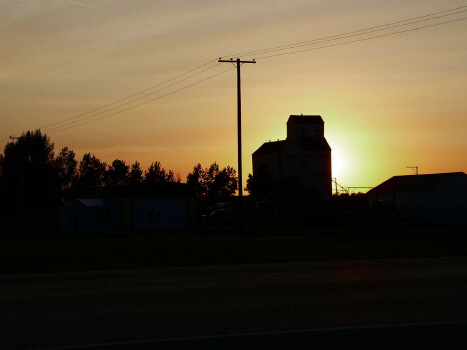
Silhouette of last remaining elevator

== See also ==
- List of communities in Saskatchewan
- List of towns in Saskatchewan
