= Lipton, Saskatchewan =

Village in Saskatchewan, Canada

Lipton
- Village
- Village of Lipton
- Location within Saskatchewan Location within Canada
- Coordinates: 50°54′10″N 103°50′55″W
- Country: Canada
- Province: Saskatchewan
- Region: Southeast
- Census division: 6
- Rural Municipality: Lipton
- Incorporated village): 1905

Government
  - Type: Municipal
  - Governing body: Lipton Village Council
  - Administrator: Wanda McLeod
  - MLA: Travis Keisig

Area
  - Total: 0.75 km^{2} (0.29 sq mi)

Population (2016)
  - Total: 345
  - Density: 458.7/km^{2} (1,188/sq mi)
- Time zone: UTC-6 (CST)
- Postal code: S0G 3B0
- Area code: 306
- Highways: Highway 22
- Railways: Canadian Pacific Railway
- Website: Village of Lipton

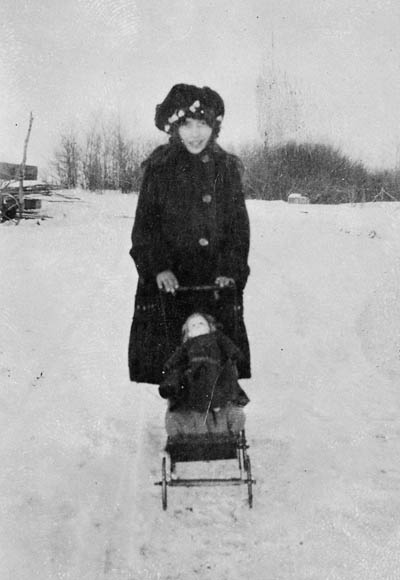
Toba Cohen of Lipton Colony

Lipton (2016 population: 345) is a village in the Canadian province of Saskatchewan within the Rural Municipality of Lipton No. 217 and Census Division No. 6. The village is located 17 kilometres (11 mi) north of the town of Fort Qu'Appelle on Highway 22.

== History ==
Settlers began arriving in the early 1880s. Lipton was incorporated as a village on May 15, 1905.

== Climate ==
Climate data for Lipton
Month	Jan	Feb	Mar	Apr	May	Jun	Jul	Aug	Sep	Oct	Nov	Dec	Year
Record high °C (°F)	7.5 (45.5)	9.5 (49.1)	19.5 (67.1)	31.7 (89.1)	39.0 (102.2)	40.5 (104.9)	38.5 (101.3)	39.4 (102.9)	36.1 (97.0)	31.0 (87.8)	22.2 (72.0)	12.5 (54.5)	40.5 (104.9)
Mean daily maximum °C (°F)	−11.6 (11.1)	−7.5 (18.5)	−0.3 (31.5)	10.6 (51.1)	18.4 (65.1)	22.6 (72.7)	25.0 (77.0)	24.7 (76.5)	18.1 (64.6)	10.7 (51.3)	−1.3 (29.7)	−9.1 (15.6)	8.3 (46.9)
Daily mean °C (°F)	−17.1 (1.2)	−12.8 (9.0)	−5.7 (21.7)	4.1 (39.4)	11.2 (52.2)	15.7 (60.3)	18.0 (64.4)	17.2 (63.0)	11.2 (52.2)	4.5 (40.1)	−6.1 (21.0)	−14.1 (6.6)	2.2 (36.0)
Mean daily minimum °C (°F)	−22.5 (−8.5)	−18.2 (−0.8)	−11.1 (12.0)	−2.5 (27.5)	4.0 (39.2)	8.8 (47.8)	10.9 (51.6)	9.8 (49.6)	4.2 (39.6)	−1.9 (28.6)	−10.8 (12.6)	−19.1 (−2.4)	−4.0 (24.8)
Record low °C (°F)	−46.7 (−52.1)	−47.2 (−53.0)	−41.7 (−43.1)	−25.0 (−13.0)	−10.6 (12.9)	−7.2 (19.0)	−1.7 (28.9)	−5.6 (21.9)	−12.8 (9.0)	−23.5 (−10.3)	−35.5 (−31.9)	−45.0 (−49.0)	−47.2 (−53.0)
Average precipitation mm (inches)	24.3 (0.96)	14.9 (0.59)	23.9 (0.94)	26.6 (1.05)	53.2 (2.09)	78.2 (3.08)	68.7 (2.70)	51.3 (2.02)	39.3 (1.55)	25.1 (0.99)	16.4 (0.65)	25.4 (1.00)	447.2 (17.61)
Source: Environment Canada

== Demographics ==
Population history (1981–2016)
Year	Pop.	±%
1981	364	—
1986	372	+2.2%
1991	352	−5.4%
1996	345	−2.0%
2001	331	−4.1%
2006	342	+3.3%
2011	372	+8.8%
2016	345	−7.3%
Source: Statistics Canada via Saskatchewan Bureau of Statistics

In the 2021 Census of Population conducted by Statistics Canada, Lipton had a population of 333 living in 137 of its 154 total private dwellings, a change of −3.5% from its 2016 population of 345. With a land area of 0.7 km^{2} (0.27 sq mi), it had a population density of 405.7/km^{2} (1,050.8/sq mi) in 2021.

In the 2016 Census of Population, the Village of Lipton recorded a population of 345 living in 158 of its 173 total private dwellings, a −7.8% change from its 2011 population of 372. With a land area of 0.75 km^{2} (0.29 sq mi), it had a population density of 460.0/km^{2} (1,191.4/sq mi) in 2016.

== See also ==
- List of communities in Saskatchewan
- List of villages in Saskatchewan
- Jewish Colonization Association § History
