= Rural Municipality of McLeod No. 185 =

Rural municipality in Saskatchewan, Canada

McLeod No. 185
- Rural municipality
- Rural Municipality of McLeod No. 185
- Location of the RM of McLeod No. 185 in Saskatchewan
- Coordinates: 50.593°N 103.040°W
- Country: Canada
- Province: Saskatchewan
- Census division: 5
- SARM division: 1
- Formed: January 1, 1913

Government
  - Reeve: Clifford Allen
  - Governing body: RM of McLeod No. 185 Council
  - Administrator: Tara Harris
  - Office location: Neudorf

Area (2016)
  - Land: 886.6 km^{2} (342.3 sq mi)

Population (2016)
  - Total: 365
  - Density: 0.4/km^{2} (1.0/sq mi)
- Time zone: CST
  - Summer (DST): CST
- Area codes: 306 and 639

The Rural Municipality of McLeod No. 185 (2016 population: 365) is a rural municipality (RM) in the Canadian province of Saskatchewan within Census Division No. 5 and SARM Division No. 1. It is located in the southeast portion of the province.

== Geography ==
=== Communities and localities ===
The following urban municipalities are surrounded by the RM.

Villages

- Lemberg
- Neudorf

== History ==
The RM of McLeod No. 185 incorporated as a rural municipality on January 1, 1913.

Heritage properties

There are three historical buildings located within the RM.

- Pheasant Forks Heritage Site - In Pheasant Forks the site consists of a school and a church. The church (originally called the Zion Methodist Church or Pheasant Forks Church) was constructed in 1905 by Primitive Methodist Colonists and remained in service until 1963. The four room school was constructed in 1920.
- Weissenberg School - Constructed in 1900 the one room school was the first separate (Catholic public school) in Saskatchewan. The school remained in service until 1964. It was originally called the Weissenberg Roman Catholic Public School; Weissenberg Separate School; and eventually the Weissenberg Teacherage.
- Zion Lutheran Church - Constructed in 1892, the church remained in active service until June 1964. Since that time a historical service is held each June.

== Demographics ==
Population history (1981–2016)
Year	Pop.	±%
1981	848	—
1986	796	−6.1%
1991	743	−6.7%
1996	677	−8.9%
2001	598	−11.7%
2006	508	−15.1%
2011	446	−12.2%
2016	365	−18.2%
Source: Statistics Canada via Saskatchewan Bureau of Statistics

In the 2021 Census of Population conducted by Statistics Canada, the RM of McLeod No. 185 had a population of 401 living in 170 of its 199 total private dwellings, a change of 9.9% from its 2016 population of 365. With a land area of 872.52 km^{2} (336.88 sq mi), it had a population density of 0.5/km^{2} (1.2/sq mi) in 2021.

In the 2016 Census of Population, the RM of McLeod No. 185 recorded a population of 365 living in 160 of its 190 total private dwellings, a −18.2% change from its 2011 population of 446. With a land area of 886.6 km^{2} (342.3 sq mi), it had a population density of 0.4/km^{2} (1.1/sq mi) in 2016.

== Government ==
The RM of McLeod No. 185 is governed by an elected municipal council and an appointed administrator that meets on the second Wednesday of every month. The reeve of the RM is Clifford Allen while its administrator is Tara Harris. The RM's office is located in Neudorf.

== Transportation ==
Lemberg Airport is located within the rural municipality.
