= Rural Municipality of Emerald No. 277 =

Rural municipality in Saskatchewan, Canada

Emerald No. 277
- Rural municipality
- Rural Municipality of Emerald No. 277
- Location of the RM of Emerald No. 277 in Saskatchewan
- Coordinates: 51.530°N 103.901°W
- Country: Canada
- Province: Saskatchewan
- Census division: 10
- SARM division: 4
- Formed: December 12, 1910

Government
  - Reeve: Morris Karakochuk
  - Governing body: RM of Emerald No. 277 Council
  - Administrator: Sharolyn Prisiak
  - Office location: Wishart

Area (2016)
  - Land: 854.44 km^{2} (329.90 sq mi)

Population (2016)
  - Total: 405
  - Density: 0.5/km^{2} (1.3/sq mi)
- Time zone: CST
  - Summer (DST): CST
- Area codes: 306 and 639

The Rural Municipality of Emerald No. 277 (2016 population: 405) is a rural municipality (RM) in the Canadian province of Saskatchewan within Census Division No. 10 and SARM Division No. 4.

== History ==
The RM of Emerald No. 277 incorporated as a rural municipality on December 12, 1910.

== Geography ==
=== Communities and localities ===
The following unincorporated communities are within the RM.

Organized hamlets

- Wishart (dissolved as a village, January 1, 2002)

Localities

- Bankend
- Wynot

== Demographics ==
Population history (1981–2016)
Year	Pop.	±%
1981	945	—
1986	848	−10.3%
1991	774	−8.7%
1996	644	−16.8%
2001	548	−14.9%
2006	549	+0.2%
2011	447	−18.6%
2016	405	−9.4%
Source: Statistics Canada via Saskatchewan Bureau of Statistics

In the 2021 Census of Population conducted by Statistics Canada, the RM of Emerald No. 277 had a population of 370 living in 178 of its 210 total private dwellings, a change of −8.6% from its 2016 population of 405. With a land area of 807.18 km^{2} (311.65 sq mi), it had a population density of 0.5/km^{2} (1.2/sq mi) in 2021.

In the 2016 Census of Population, the RM of Emerald No. 277 recorded a population of 405 living in 205 of its 258 total private dwellings, a −9.4% change from its 2011 population of 447. With a land area of 854.44 km^{2} (329.90 sq mi), it had a population density of 0.5/km^{2} (1.2/sq mi) in 2016.

== Attractions ==
- Touchwood Hills Post Provincial Historic Park
- Kellross Heritage Museum
- Kelliher & District Museum
- Foam Lake Marsh

== Government ==
The RM of Emerald No. 277 is governed by an elected municipal council and an appointed administrator that meets on the second Tuesday of every month. The reeve of the RM is Morris Karakochuk while its administrator is Sharolyn Prisiak. The RM's office is located in Wishart.

== Transportation ==
- Saskatchewan Highway 35
- Saskatchewan Highway 639
- Saskatchewan Highway 743

== See also ==
- List of rural municipalities in Saskatchewan
