= Rural Municipality of Tullymet No. 216 =

Rural municipality in Saskatchewan, Canada

Tullymet No. 216
- Rural municipality
- Rural Municipality of Tullymet No. 216
- Location of the RM of Tullymet No. 216 in Saskatchewan
- Coordinates: 50.970°N 103.449°W
- Country: Canada
- Province: Saskatchewan
- Census division: 6
- SARM division: 1
- Formed: January 1, 1913

Government
  - Reeve: Aaron Keisig
  - Governing body: RM of Tullymet No. 216 Council
  - Administrator: Sheila Keisig
  - Office location: Tullymet Yard

Area (2016)
  - Land: 562.99 km^{2} (217.37 sq mi)

Population (2016)
  - Total: 200
  - Density: 0.4/km^{2} (1.0/sq mi)
- Time zone: CST
  - Summer (DST): CST
- Area codes: 306 and 639

The Rural Municipality of Tullymet No. 216 (2016 population: 200) is a rural municipality (RM) in the Canadian province of Saskatchewan within Census Division No. 6 and SARM Division No. 1.

== History ==
The RM of Tullymet No. 216 incorporated as a rural municipality on January 1, 1913.

Heritage properties

There are three historical sites located within the RM.

- File Hills Post Office\Thompson Farm - Constructed in 1900, the site is located five kilometres south of the Town of Ituna.
- Jewish Cemetery (also called the Lipton Jewish Cemetery) - Established in 1902, the cemetery is the resting place for early Jewish Romania immigrants.
- Tullymet Yard (also called the Robertson Homestead; Tullymet Post Office; RM of Tullymet No. 216 Office) - Now used as the office and maintenance yard by the municipality, the yard was originally the Robertson Homestead when it was constructed from 1907 to 1937.

== Demographics ==
Population history (1981–2016)
Year	Pop.	±%
1981	480	—
1986	419	−12.7%
1991	378	−9.8%
1996	331	−12.4%
2001	268	−19.0%
2006	245	−8.6%
2011	220	−10.2%
2016	200	−9.1%
Source: Statistics Canada via Saskatchewan Bureau of Statistics

In the 2021 Census of Population conducted by Statistics Canada, the RM of Tullymet No. 216 had a population of 183 living in 78 of its 93 total private dwellings, a change of −8.5% from its 2016 population of 200. With a land area of 555.62 km^{2} (214.53 sq mi), it had a population density of 0.3/km^{2} (0.9/sq mi) in 2021.

In the 2016 Census of Population, the RM of Tullymet No. 216 recorded a population of 200 living in 87 of its 105 total private dwellings, a −9.1% change from its 2011 population of 220. With a land area of 562.99 km^{2} (217.37 sq mi), it had a population density of 0.4/km^{2} (0.9/sq mi) in 2016.

== Government ==
The RM of Tullymet No. 216 is governed by an elected municipal council and an appointed administrator that meets on the first Tuesday of every month. The reeve of the RM is Bill Huber while its administrator is Sheila Keisig. The RM's office is located in Balcarres.

== See also ==
- List of rural municipalities in Saskatchewan
