= Cupar, Saskatchewan =

Town in Saskatchewan, Canada

Cupar
- Town
- Location of Cupar in Saskatchewan Cupar (Canada)
- Coordinates: 50.95°N 104.2167°W
- Country: Canada
- Province: Saskatchewan
- Census division: 6
- Rural Municipality: Cupar No. 218
- Post office established: 1903
- Incorporated (Village): 1905
- Named for: Cupar

Government
  - Mayor: Andy Boha
  - Administrator: Silvia Virgilio
  - Governing body: Town Council

Area
  - Total: 0.80 km^{2} (0.31 sq mi)
- Elevation: 610 m (2,000 ft)

Population (2011)
  - Total: 579
  - Density: 726.7/km^{2} (1,882/sq mi)
- Time zone: UTC−6 (CST)
- Postal code: S0G 0Y0
- Area code: 306
- Highways: Highway 22 / Highway 640
- Website: townofcupar.com

Cupar (/ˈkjuːpɑːr/ KYOO-par) is a town 75 kilometres (47 mi) northeast of Regina in the Canadian province of Saskatchewan. Cupar is settled on the flat plains 45 kilometres (28 mi) north of the scenic Qu'Appelle Valley. Known for its remarkable hockey history, it is often called the Home of Eddie Shore, as the legendary NHL defenceman was raised there.

Cupar is the home of artist Jacqueline Berting. The Berting Glass studio is located north of town. One of her best known works is The Glass Wheatfield, encompassing 1,400 waist-high glass wheat stalks, each piece individually hand cut and lamp worked. Berting calls her work "a salute to the Canadian farmer".

The town hosts the Cupar Gopher Drop, a unique lottery held every summer. Stuffed toy gophers (Richardson's ground squirrels) labelled with numbers are dropped from a hot-air balloon along with numbered gopher holes. The "owner" of the gopher that lands nearest Hole 1 wins first prize, and so on.

== History ==
Cupar became a village in 1905. It was named by a Canadian Pacific Railway official after the town of Cupar in Fife, Scotland. The town celebrated its centennial in 2005.

== Sports ==
Cupar has a swimming pool, ice rink, curling rink, ball diamonds, and golf. The Cupar Canucks of the senior men's Highway Hockey League play here.

== Demographics ==
In the 2021 Census of Population conducted by Statistics Canada, Cupar had a population of 598 living in 246 of its 274 total private dwellings, a change of 6% from its 2016 population of 564. With a land area of 0.86 km^{2} (0.33 sq mi), it had a population density of 695.3/km^{2} (1,800.9/sq mi) in 2021.

Canada census – Cupar community profile

	2021	2016	2011
Population	598 (+6.0% from 2016)	564 (-2.6% from 2011)	579 (2.3% from 2006)
Land area	0.86 km^{2} (0.33 sq mi)	0.80 km^{2} (0.31 sq mi)	0.80 km^{2} (0.31 sq mi)
Population density	694.1/km^{2} (1,798/sq mi)	706.7/km^{2} (1,830/sq mi)	726.7/km^{2} (1,882/sq mi)
Median age	41.2 (M: 40.8, F: 42.0)	44.5 (M: 41.6, F: 49.2)	46.9 (M: 39.8, F: 51.8)
Private dwellings	274 (total) 246 (occupied)	276 (total)	273 (total)
Median household income	$71,000

References: 2021 2016 2011

== Climate ==
Climate data for Cupar
Month	Jan	Feb	Mar	Apr	May	Jun	Jul	Aug	Sep	Oct	Nov	Dec	Year
Record high °C (°F)	8.3 (46.9)	9 (48)	21.1 (70.0)	31 (88)	37.5 (99.5)	39.5 (103.1)	38.3 (100.9)	40 (104)	35.6 (96.1)	30.6 (87.1)	22.2 (72.0)	12.5 (54.5)	40 (104)
Mean daily maximum °C (°F)	−10.9 (12.4)	−7.2 (19.0)	−0.1 (31.8)	11.2 (52.2)	18.7 (65.7)	22.9 (73.2)	25.3 (77.5)	24.8 (76.6)	18.3 (64.9)	11.2 (52.2)	−0.6 (30.9)	−8.1 (17.4)	8.8 (47.8)
Daily mean °C (°F)	−17 (1)	−13.3 (8.1)	−6 (21)	4.3 (39.7)	11.1 (52.0)	15.9 (60.6)	18.1 (64.6)	17.2 (63.0)	11.1 (52.0)	4.3 (39.7)	−6 (21)	−13.8 (7.2)	2.2 (36.0)
Mean daily minimum °C (°F)	−23.1 (−9.6)	−19.3 (−2.7)	−11.9 (10.6)	−2.7 (27.1)	3.5 (38.3)	9 (48)	10.9 (51.6)	9.6 (49.3)	3.8 (38.8)	−2.6 (27.3)	−11.3 (11.7)	−19.5 (−3.1)	−4.5 (23.9)
Record low °C (°F)	−44.4 (−47.9)	−45 (−49)	−44.4 (−47.9)	−27.2 (−17.0)	−11 (12)	−4.4 (24.1)	−1.1 (30.0)	−3.9 (25.0)	−15 (5)	−22 (−8)	−39 (−38)	−45 (−49)	−45 (−49)
Average precipitation mm (inches)	18.1 (0.71)	12.8 (0.50)	18.6 (0.73)	24.5 (0.96)	52.1 (2.05)	73.2 (2.88)	67.9 (2.67)	49.9 (1.96)	37.6 (1.48)	21.7 (0.85)	13.6 (0.54)	21.4 (0.84)	411.3 (16.19)
Source: Environment Canada

== Notable people ==
- Glen Hart, former member of the Legislative Assembly of Saskatchewan
- Eddie Shore, ice hockey defenceman
- Rob Tudor, ice hockey centre
- Arnold Tusa, former member and speaker of the Legislative Assembly of Saskatchewan

== See also ==
- List of communities in Saskatchewan
- List of towns in Saskatchewan
- Jewish Colony in 1901
