= Rural Municipality of Cupar No. 218 =

Rural municipality in Saskatchewan, Canada

Cupar No. 218
- Rural municipality
- Rural Municipality of Cupar No. 218
- Location of the RM of Cupar No. 218 in Saskatchewan
- Coordinates: 50.853°N 104.322°W
- Country: Canada
- Province: Saskatchewan
- Census division: 6
- SARM division: 2
- Formed: December 13, 1909

Government
  - Reeve: Raymond Orb
  - Governing body: RM of Cupar No. 218 Council
  - Administrator: Nicole Czemeres
  - Office location: Cupar

Area (2016)
  - Land: 912.96 km^{2} (352.50 sq mi)

Population (2016)
  - Total: 503
  - Density: 0.6/km^{2} (1.6/sq mi)
- Time zone: CST
  - Summer (DST): CST
- Area codes: 306 and 639

The Rural Municipality of Cupar No. 218 (2016 population: 503) is a rural municipality (RM) in the Canadian province of Saskatchewan within Census Division No. 6 and SARM Division No. 2.

== History ==
The RM of Cupar No. 218 incorporated as a rural municipality on December 13, 1909.

Heritage properties

There are two historical sites located within the RM.

- Gregherd School Site — Constructed in 1914, the site contains a one-room school house and monument.
- Wheatwyn Church (also called the Wheatwyn Lutheran Church or Zion Lutheran Church) — Established in 1906 – 1907 and constructed of field stone, the church is of a Gothic Vernacular style.

== Geography ==
=== Communities and localities ===
The following urban municipalities lie within the RM.

Towns

- Southey
- Cupar

Villages

- Markinch

== Demographics ==
Population history (1981–2016)
Year	Pop.	±%
1981	753	—
1986	683	−9.3%
1991	660	−3.4%
1996	576	−12.7%
2001	550	−4.5%
2006	502	−8.7%
2011	554	+10.4%
2016	503	−9.2%
Source: Statistics Canada via Saskatchewan Bureau of Statistics

In the 2021 Census of Population conducted by Statistics Canada, the RM of Cupar No. 218 had a population of 516 living in 202 of its 234 total private dwellings, a change of 2.6% from its 2016 population of 503. With a land area of 905.53 km^{2} (349.63 sq mi), it had a population density of 0.6/km^{2} (1.5/sq mi) in 2021.

In the 2016 Census of Population, the RM of Cupar No. 218 recorded a population of 503 living in 194 of its 222 total private dwellings, a −9.2% change from its 2011 population of 554. With a land area of 912.96 km^{2} (352.50 sq mi), it had a population density of 0.6/km^{2} (1.4/sq mi) in 2016.

== Government ==
The RM of Cupar No. 218 is governed by an elected municipal council and an appointed administrator that meets on the second Friday of every month. The reeve of the RM is Raymond Orb while its administrator is Nicole Czemeres. The RM's office is located in Cupar.
