= Saskatchewan Highway 320 =

Provincial highway in Saskatchewan, Canada

Highway 320

Route information
- Maintained by Ministry of Highways and Infrastructure
- Length: 26.2 km (16.3 mi)

Major junctions
- West end: Highway 2 near Domremy
- East end: Highway 20 near Crystal Springs

Location
- Country: Canada
- Province: Saskatchewan
- Rural municipalities: St. Louis, Invergordon

Highway system
- Provincial highways in Saskatchewan
← Highway 318	→ Highway 321

Highway 320 is a provincial highway in the Canadian province of Saskatchewan. It runs from Highway 2 near Domremy to Highway 20 near Crystal Springs. The highway also passes near the communities of Northern Light and Tway. It is about 26 kilometres (16 mi) long.

== Route description ==
Hwy 320 begins in the Rural Municipality of St. Louis No. 431 at an intersection with Hwy 2 just west of the village of Domremy, just north of that highway's junction with Hwy 225. It heads east as a paved two-lane to travel along the northern boundary of the village via 3rd Street N, where it crosses a railway, before leaving the village is the pavement transitions to gravel. The highway heads through rural farmland for the next several kilometres, passing just to the south of the hamlet of Northern Light, access via Northern Light Road (Range Road 2252), before entering the Rural Municipality of Invergordon No. 430. Continuing east, Hwy 320 passes just to the north of the hamlet of Tway, access via Range Road 2245, and the Tway National Wildlife Area before crossing a bridge over the Carrot River and coming to an end shortly thereafter at a junction with Hwy 20 after crossing a former railway.

== Major intersections ==
Rural municipality	Location	km	mi	Destinations	Notes
St. Louis No. 431		0.0	0.0	Highway 2 (Veterans Memorial Highway) – Wakaw, Prince Albert	Western terminus
St. Louis No. 431	Domremy	1.6	0.99	2nd Avenue / Range Road 2264	Western end of unpaved section
St. Louis No. 431		14.9	9.3	Northern Light Road (Range Road 2252) – Northern Light	
Invergordon No. 430		19.8	12.3	Range Road 2245 – Tway	
Invergordon No. 430		25.6	15.9	Bridge over the Carrot River	
Invergordon No. 430		26.2	16.3	Highway 20 – Birch Hills, Humboldt	Eastern terminus; eastern end of unpaved section; road continues east as Township Road 442
1.000 mi = 1.609 km; 1.000 km = 0.621 mi

== See also ==
- Transportation in Saskatchewan
- Roads in Saskatchewan
