= Last Mountain =

Last Mountain may refer to:

- Last Mountain (Saskatchewan), a mountain in Saskatchewan
- Last Mountain Lake, formally known as Long Lake, a lake in south central Saskatchewan
- Last Mountain Creek, a river in Saskatchewan
- Last Mountain House Provincial Park, a park in Saskatchewan
- Last Mountain Lake Bird Sanctuary, Saskatchewan
- Last Mountain Lake National Wildlife Area, Saskatchewan
- Rural Municipality of Last Mountain Valley No. 250, a rural municipality in Saskatchewan
- Last Mountain Regional Park, a regional park in Saskatchewan
- Last Mountain Lake 80A, Indian Reserve in Saskatchewan
- Currahee Mountain, the last (or southernmost) mountain in the Blue Ridge range, in Stephens County, Georgia

== Electoral districts ==
- Last Mountain (electoral district), a federal electoral district in Saskatchewan
- Last Mountain-Touchwood, a provincial electoral district for the Legislative Assembly of Saskatchewan
- Last Mountain (provincial electoral district), a former electoral district

== In film ==
- The Last Mountain, a 2011 American film

== Other ==
- Last Mountain Railway, a railway in Saskatchewan
