= Saskatchewan Highway 20 =

Provincial highway in Saskatchewan, Canada

Highway 20
- Highway 20 highlighted in red

Route information
- Maintained by Ministry of Highways and Infrastructure
- Length: 291.1 km (180.9 mi)

Major junctions
- South end: Highway 11 near Lumsden
- Highway 99 at Craven; Highway 22 near Bulyea; Highway 15 at Nokomis; Highway 16 (TCH/YH) at Lanigan; Highway 5 in Humboldt; Highway 41 near Tway
- North end: Highway 3 / CanAm Highway near Birch Hills

Location
- Country: Canada
- Province: Saskatchewan
- Rural municipalities: Lumsden, Longlaketon, McKillop, Rural Municipality of Last Mountain Valley No. 250, Wreford, Usborne, Wolverine, Humboldt, Three Lakes, Invergordon, Birch Hills
- Major cities: Humboldt
- Towns: Lumsden, Lanigan

Highway system
- Provincial highways in Saskatchewan
← Highway 19	→ Highway 21

Highway 20 is a north–south provincial highway in the southern part of the Canadian province of Saskatchewan. It runs from Highway 11 in the Qu'Appelle Valley at Lumsden north to Highway 3 near Birch Hills. Along its route, it provides access to several communities, lakes, and parks. The highway is about 291 kilometres (181 mi) long.

== Route description ==
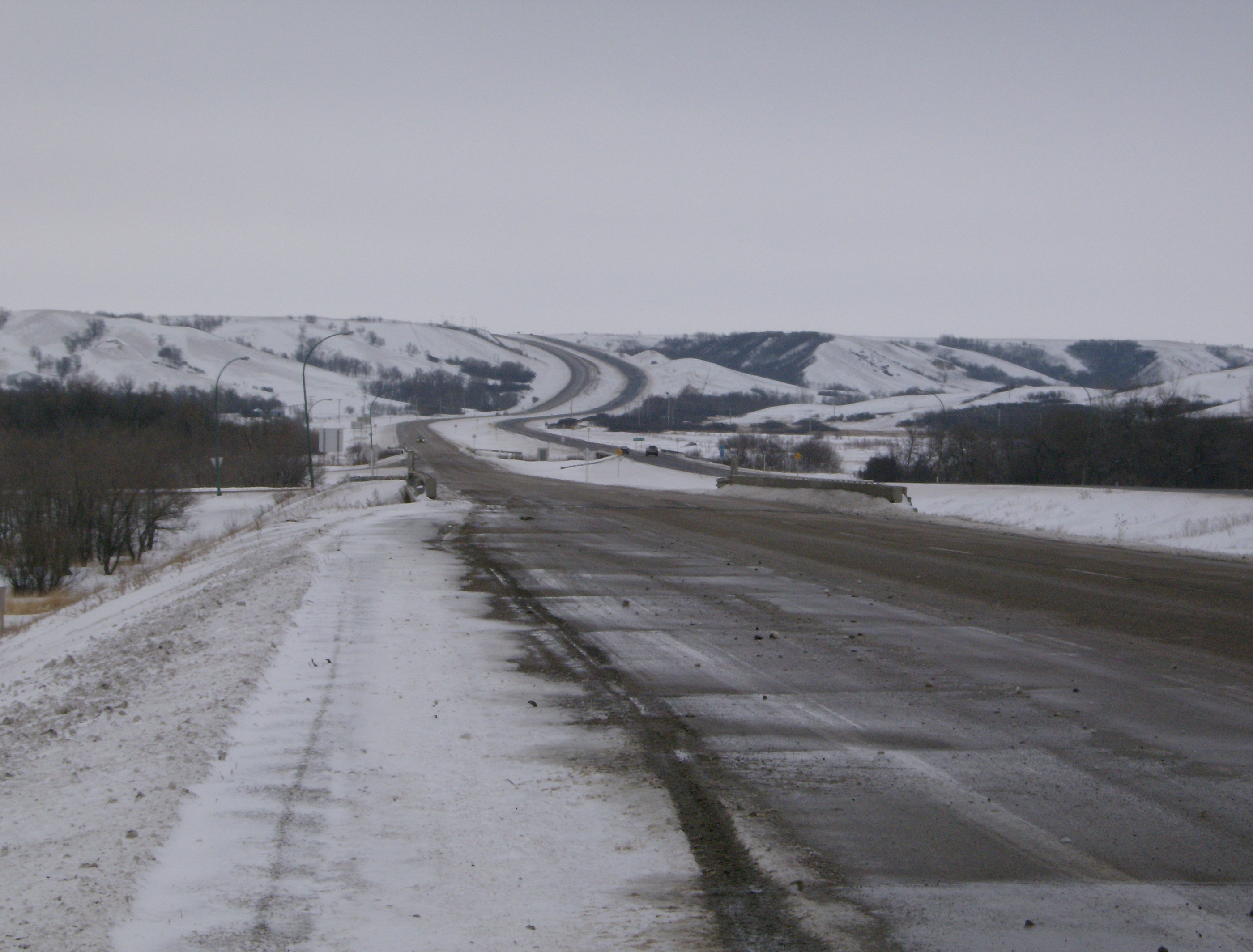
Highway 11 descending into the Qu'Appelle Valley, across the Qu'Appelle River, and over Highway 20's southern terminus at Lumsden

Highway 20 begins at Lumsden and Highway 11 in the Qu'Appelle Valley and follows the Qu'Appelle River north-east to Craven. At Craven, it turns north and follows Last Mountain Creek to Valeport Marsh, the southern end of Last Mountain Lake, and Last Mountain House Provincial Park. Near the park, Highway 20 intersects with Highway 322. Highway 322 heads north-west following the eastern shore of Last Mountain Lake while Highway 20 heads north past Gibbs to Bulyea and the intersection with Highway 220. Highway 220 heads west to Last Mountain Lake and Rowan's Ravine Provincial Park. From Bulyea, Highway 20 heads north-northwest to Strasbourg and Duval. After Duval, it resumes its northerly routing passing by the communities of Cymric, Govan, Hatfield, Nokomis, Lockwood, and Drake en route to Highway 16 and Lanigan. From there, Highway 20 begins a 10-kilometre (6.2 mi) long concurrency with Highway 16 (the Yellowhead Highway) that runs west of Lanigan towards Guernsey. Less than 3 kilometres (1.9 mi) before Gurnsey, Highway 20 leaves the concurrency with 16 and resumes its northerly routing.

From Highway 16, Highway 20 heads north towards Humboldt. Along this stretch, the highway provides access to Burr and Bay Trail and skirts around the western shore of Humboldt Lake. In Humboldt, Highway 20 intersects Highway 5 then continues north-northwest to its northern terminus at Highway 3, just east of Birch Hills. Along this final leg, the highway provides access to the communities of Fulda, Pilger, Middle Lake, St. Benedict, Tarnopol, and Crystal Springs; intersects Highways 756, 669, 777, 41, 320, and 778; and passes by the lakes of Burton, Deadmoose, Houghton, Lucien, Basin, Dixon, and Jumping. Lucien Lake is home to Lucien Lake Regional Park and Basin Lake is part of the Basin and Middle Lakes Migratory Bird Sanctuary.

== Highway improvements ==
- In September 2000, a 6.6-kilometre (4.1 mi) section north of Lanigan was resurfaced
- In June 2001, a 12-kilometre (7.5 mi) section of the highway north of the Highway 16 junction near Guernsey was resurfaced at an estimated cost of $800,000

== Major attractions ==
Attractions accessed from Highway 20 include:

- 20-foot (6.1 metres) high Whooping Crane named Walter was built April 1987 by the side of Highway 20 near Govan
- Basin and Middle Lakes Migratory Bird Sanctuary
- Lucien Lake Regional Park near the village of Middle Lake
- Last Mountain House Provincial Park
- Last Mountain Regional Park
- RiverPark Campground near Lumsden
- Craven World Campground near Craven which hosts the annual summer Craven Country Jamboree
- Humboldt & District Museum and Art Gallery and Humboldt Historic Water Tower
- Strasbourg railway station in Strasbourg has been refurbished into a museum

== Major intersections ==
From south to north:

Rural municipality	Location	km	mi	Destinations	Notes
Lumsden No. 189	Lumsden	0.0	0.0	Highway 641 south – Pense Highway 11 (Louis Riel Trail) – Saskatoon, Regina	Interchange; continues as Highway 641; south end of Highway 641 concurrency
Lumsden No. 189		9.4	5.8	Highway 729 east (Russell Hill Road)	
↑ / ↓		9.9	6.2	Crosses the Qu'Appelle River	
Longlaketon No. 219	Craven	10.0	6.2	Highway 641 north – Earl Grey	North end of Highway 641 concurrency
Longlaketon No. 219	Craven	10.3	6.4	Highway 99 east – Southey	
Longlaketon No. 219		19.6	12.2	Highway 322 north – Silton	
McKillop No. 220		35.9	22.3	Highway 22 east – Southey, Fort Qu'Appelle	
McKillop No. 220	Bulyea	39.1	24.3	Highway 220 west – Rowan's Ravine Provincial Park	
McKillop No. 220	Strasbourg	51.5	32.0	Highway 731 east – Serath	
Last Mountain Valley No. 250	No major junctions				
Wreford No. 280		91.1	56.6	Highway 15 east – Raymore	South end of Highway 15 concurrency
Wreford No. 280	Nokomis	100.8	62.6	Highway 15 west – Kenaston, Outlook	North end of Highway 15 concurrency
Wreford No. 280	Nokomis	101.0	62.8	Highway 744 east	
Usborne No. 310		127.0	78.9	To Highway 761 west – Drake	
Usborne No. 310	Lanigan	138.6	86.1	Highway 16 (TCH/YH) east – Yorkton	South end of Highway 16 concurrency
Usborne No. 310	Lanigan	142.0	88.2	Highway 761 – Drake, Leroy	
Usborne No. 310		148.7	92.4	Highway 16 (TCH/YH) west – Saskatoon	North end of Highway 16 concurrency
Wolverine No. 340 Humboldt No. 370	No major junctions				
City of Humboldt		186.8	116.1	Highway 5 (Glen Hall Drive / 8th Avenue) – Saskatoon, Watson	
Humboldt No. 370		199.7	124.1	Highway 756 east – Annaheim	
Humboldt No. 370		212.2	131.9	Highway 669 south	Near Fulda
Three Lakes No. 400		222.8	138.4	Highway 777 east – Lake Lenore	Near Pilger; south end of Highway 777 concurrency
Three Lakes No. 400	Middle Lake	227.0	141.1	Highway 777 west – Cudworth	North end of Highway 777 concurrency
Invergordon No. 430		258.8	160.8	Highway 41 – Saskatoon, Wakaw, Melfort	
Invergordon No. 430		261.2	162.3	Tway Access Road	
Invergordon No. 430		266.1	165.3	Highway 320 west – Domremy	
Invergordon No. 430	Crystal Springs	268.5	166.8	Highway 778 east – Kinistino	
Birch Hills No. 460		291.1	180.9	Highway 3 / CanAm Highway – Prince Albert, Birch Hills, Melfort	
1.000 mi = 1.609 km; 1.000 km = 0.621 mi: Concurrency terminus

== See also ==
- Transportation in Saskatchewan
- Roads in Saskatchewan
