= Cymric, Saskatchewan =

Community in Saskatchewan, Canada

Cymric
- Unincorporated community
- Location of Cymric Cymric (Canada)
- Coordinates: 51°14′00″N 104°56′02″W
- Country: Canada
- Province: Saskatchewan
- Census division: 11
- Rural Municipality: Last Mountain Valley
- Post office Founded: 1912-08-01
- Time zone: CST
- Postal code: S0G 0Z0
- Area code: 306
- Highways: Highway 20
- Railway: Canadian Pacific Railway

Cymric is an unincorporated community in the Rural Municipality of Last Mountain Valley No. 250, Saskatchewan, Canada. It is located along Highway 20 between Duval and Govan, it is also serviced by the Canadian Pacific Railway and located at mile 62.3 on the rail line running between Regina and Lanigan.

== History ==
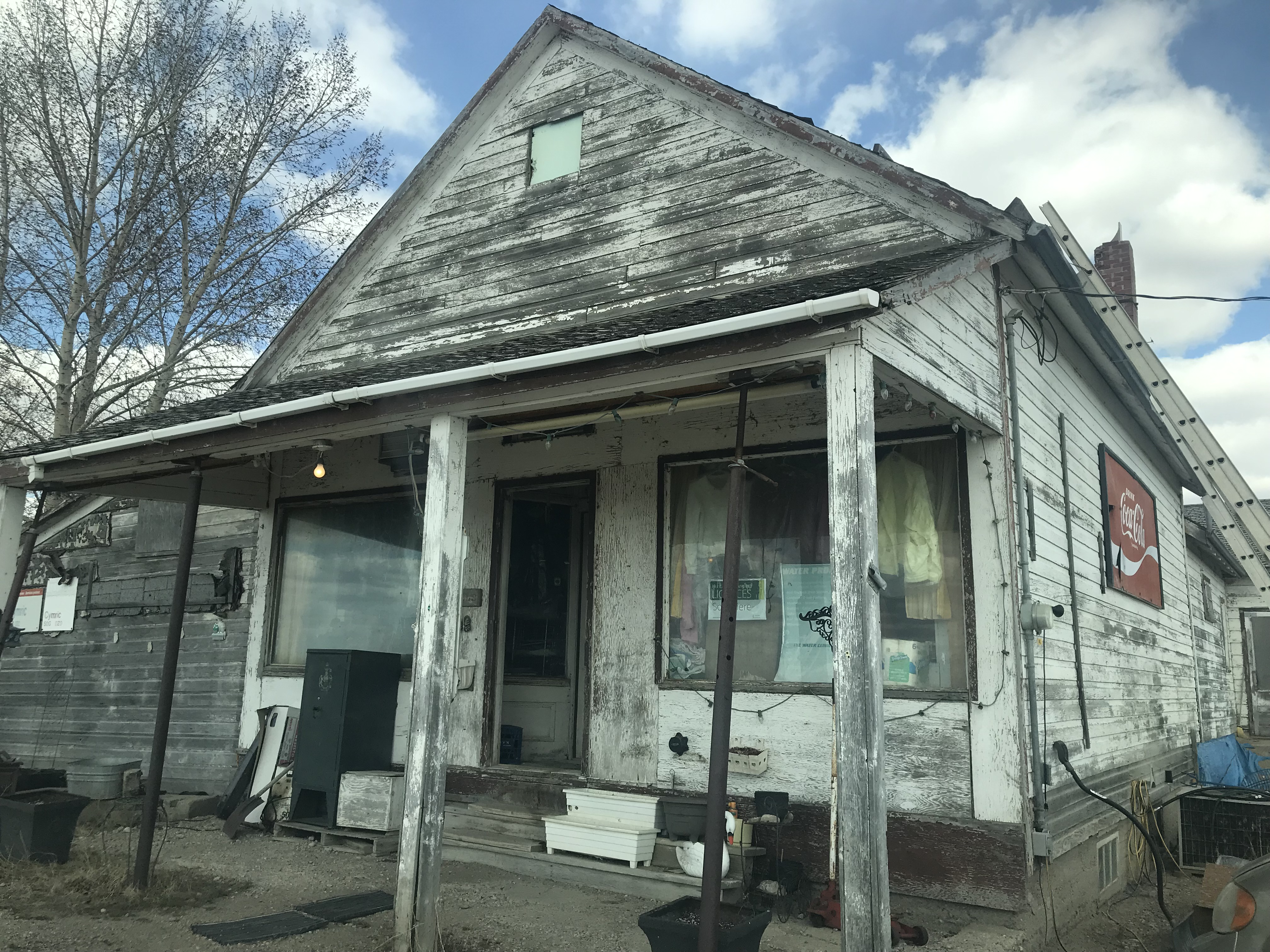
The D & L General Store on Highway 20 near Cymric, Saskatchewan

Cymric is a Welsh word and named by a family of early Welsh settlers. The first group of settlers in this area where Volga Germans who settled the area in the late 19^{^{th}} century, followed later by British and Norwegian settlers. The Neu Elsass (New Alsace) Colony was established in 1884 by D.W. Riedl, a German immigration agent from Winnipeg. It was the first German colony established in Saskatchewan. Neu Elsass began when twenty-two families homesteaded near Strasbourg. The original area of Neu Elsass Colony was the region around the central and southern portion of Last Mountain Lake and included Strasbourg, Duval, Bulyea, Earl Grey, Gibbs, Silton, Dilke, Holdfast, Penzance, and Liberty. The area of German settlement expanded into surrounding areas, including Cymric and in effect, doubling the area of the colony.

The Canadian Pacific Railway erected a portable train station along the rail line in 1911 which was replaced in 1924 by an imported standard number five station which was removed in 1943. At its peak, the community had four grain elevators. The community's first post office was set up in 1912. The Cymric Presbyterian Church held its first service on December 17, 1916, with Reverend J.C. Madill presiding. It was built on land donated by Alex Reid. The church later became a United Church in 1925 which was closed in 1968 and the building sold for $100 and moved to the Methodist Church camp at Arlington Beach on nearby Last Mountain Lake.

All that remains of Cymric today is the St. Paul's Lutheran Cemetery, which was attached to a church southwest of Cymric and the D & L General Store on Highway 20 which still serves as a post office for the area.

== See also ==
- List of communities in Saskatchewan

== Notable people ==
- Tom Johnston
