= Waldsea Lake =

Lake in Saskatchewan, Canada

- Location in Saskatchewan Waldsea Lake (Canada)
- Location: RM of Humboldt No. 370, Saskatchewan
- Coordinates: 52°17′00″N 105°12′02″W
- Type: Salt lake
- Part of: Saskatchewan River drainage basin
- Primary outflows: None
- Basin countries: Canada
- Surface area: 5 km^{2} (1.9 sq mi)
- Average depth: 8.1 m (27 ft)
- Shore length^{1}: 11 km (6.8 mi)
- Settlements: None
- ^{1} Shore length is not a well-defined measure.

Waldsea Lake is a salt lake in the central part of the Canadian province of Saskatchewan, about 100 kilometres (62 mi) east of Saskatoon, near Carmel. The lake is partially saline with strong concentrations of sodium, sulfate, magnesium, and chloride ions. It is part of the terminal Lenore Lake basin, which is within the Carrot River watershed. The Lenore Lake basin includes several other saline lakes, such as Lenore, Basin, Middle, Frog, Ranch, Murphy, Flat, Mantrap, Houghton, and Deadmoose, as well as the freshwater St. Brieux and Burton Lakes. The basin has no natural outlet.

== See also ==
- List of lakes of Saskatchewan
