= Arlington Beach, Saskatchewan =

Hamlet in Saskatchewan, Canada

Arlington Beach
- Hamlet
- Location of Arlington Beach in Saskatchewan Arlington Beach (Canada)
- Coordinates: 51.2414°N 105.2363°W
- Country: Canada
- Province: Saskatchewan
- Region: Saskatchewan
- Census division: 11
- Rural municipality: Last Mountain Valley No. 250
- Post office Founded: N/A
- Incorporated (Village): N/A
- Incorporated (Town): N/A

Population (2006)
  - Total: 39
- Time zone: CST
- Area code: 306
- Highways: Highway 20
- Waterways: Last Mountain Lake

Arlington Beach is a hamlet in the Canadian province of Saskatchewan. It is located on the eastern shore of Last Mountain Lake, north-west of Regina. Listed as a designated place by Statistics Canada, the hamlet had a population of 39 in the Canada 2006 Census.

Arlington Beach is home to a large camp and conference centre that hosts groups from all over Western Canada. Its main complex is the Kinney Memorial Lodge which features multiple meeting rooms, guest rooms, and a large dining hall. The hamlet is also home to the historic Arlington Beach House.

Right beside the Beach House is a mini-golf course and the local marina. This serves not only Arlington Beach but also allows for sheltered access and boat launches to Last Mountain Lake for the surrounding communities.

== History ==
The Arlington Beach House was built at Arlington Beach in 1910 where it was the centre of activity for the William Pearson Land Company. Customers were brought from all over Last Mountain Lake by early steam ships that steamed up and down the lake before the railroad came to the region in the early part of the 20th century.

Business was boosted by the early steam ship, the Welcome, which started business on Last Mountain Lake in 1905. In 1907, the Qu'Appelle, an eight crew steamer that could accommodate 200 people, made the run up and down the lake until 1913.

== Demographics ==
In the 2021 Census of Population conducted by Statistics Canada, Arlington Beach had a population of 38 living in 22 of its 72 total private dwellings, a change of 90% from its 2016 population of 20. With a land area of 0.5 km^{2} (0.19 sq mi), it had a population density of 76.0/km^{2} (196.8/sq mi) in 2021.

== Arlington Beach House ==
Arlington Beach House was very popular and was declared by visitors to be one of the coziest resort hotels in Saskatchewan. Visitors from Eastern Canada compared it favourably to their favourite watering holes back home and Arlington Beach became known as a great place to swim, fish, and boat.

As the area matured and become more populated during the 1920s and 1930s, it became a favourite spot for community picnics and activities.

As the CP Railway changed transportation patterns across the region, Arlington Beach was bought by the Canadian Sunday School Mission in 1942. At this time there was a few public buildings. One building was a dressing room for swimmers while another was a boat house. There was also a band shell and a small round building that was used for ticket sales to local sporting events.

After Arlington Beach was sold to the Canadian Sunday School Mission, buildings were moved and converted into dorms, and a large tabernacle was built for 300 people. The hotel had started to fall into disrepair and as an interim step, the fireplace was removed from the Arlington Beach House.

After two years of renting the camp, in 1960, the Free Methodist Church in Canada bought Arlington Beach House from the Canadian Sunday School Mission for $14,000.00.

In 1965 and 1966, the tabernacle from Moose Jaw Camp Grounds was dismantled, moved, and reassembled to serve as the largest meeting place at Arlington Beach. In 1968, Cymric United Church is purchased for $100.00 and moved to Arlington Beach and kept as a church. In 1975 and 1976, the Kinney Memorial Lodge opened. It has a 300-seat dining room, rooms for 84 people, two lounges and an apartment for staff. In 1980, major renovation work was done to Arlington Beach House, including rewiring, insulation, and drywall. The summer dining room attached to the hotel was moved and converted to storage and classrooms. In 1983, a marina was built to provide a calm place to launch boats.

=== Design ===
Like most buildings built in the early part of the 20th century in Saskatchewan, the hotel was stick built and featured a large two story veranda.

The main floor of the hotel has four rooms. There is a large lounge that still contains much of the original furnishings and other period pieces. It also features large dining room, a bedroom, and a double kitchen. The second floor contains six medium-sized rooms, and a two-room suite. The third floor has two large rooms and a long hallway.

The highlights of the location were:

- A 15-room hotel with dining room
- A large store building
- Four large dormitories to house 200 children
- Five 4-room cabins
- Three smaller cabins and a large castle on the hill
- Two storage sheds
- A new tabernacle building that seats 300 people
- A flowing well, with year-round water supply

=== 1910 Prices ===
The prices for the Arlington Beach House (and surrounding out buildings) in 1910 were as follows:

- First Floor — $3.00 per day, $17.50 per week.
- Second Floor — $2.25 per day, $12.50 per week.
- Furnished Cottages — containing two bedrooms, living room, and small kitchen. $3.00 per day or $17.50 per week, per person, including board to be furnished at the hotel.
- Furnished Cottages — without meals at the hotel. $15.00 per week.
- Furnished Tents — cot in tent and board at hotel $2.50 per day or $14.00 by the week per head.
- Furnished Tents — containing two cots, washing utensils, small amount of furniture, $1.25 per day or $7.00 per week.
- Unfurnished Tents — $0.85 per day, $5.00 per week.

== See also ==
- List of communities in Saskatchewan
- List of designated places in Saskatchewan
- List of historic places in rural municipalities of Saskatchewan
