= Bay Trail =

Bay Trail or Bayside Trail may refer to:

- Bay Trail, Saskatchewan, unincorporate community in Canada
- Bay Trail (Australia), a trail in Victoria, Australia
- San Francisco Bay Trail, a trail in California, United States
- Bay Trail (system on chip), computer chips in the Intel Atom (system on a chip) platform, Silvermont-based microarchitecture
  - Bay Trail-D, Silvermont based Celeron Desktop computer chip platform by Intel
  - Bay Trail-M, Silvermont based Celeron Mobile computer chip platform by Intel
- Bayside Trail, a trail in Cabrillo National Monument, California, United States
