= Last Mountain Lake Bird Sanctuary =

Bird sanctuary in Saskatchewan, Canada

- IUCN category IV (habitat/species management area)
- Interactive map of Last Mountain Lake Bird Sanctuary
- Location: Last Mountain Lake, Saskatchewan
- Nearest town: East: Govan and Nokomis; West: Imperial and Simpson
- Coordinates: 51°20′0″N 105°15′2″W
- Area: 47.36 km^{2} (18.29 sq mi)
- Elevation: 486 metres (1,594 ft)
- Established: 1887

National Historic Site of Canada
- Official name: Last Mountain Lake Bird Sanctuary National Historic Site of Canada
- Designated: 24 June 1987

Last Mountain Lake Bird Sanctuary is a National Historic Site of Canada, located in the rural municipality of Last Mountain Valley No. 250 in Saskatchewan. The migratory bird sanctuary was the first established in North America. The 47.36 km^{2} (18.29 mi^{2}) area is within the Last Mountain Lake National Wildlife Area, an International Biological Program site, and includes adjacent uplands.

The site is used as a staging or nesting area by numerous migratory and colonial bird species, including the sandhill crane and the endangered whooping crane. The lake has rich spawning grounds used by numerous fish species, including the vulnerable bigmouth buffalo.

It was recognized as a National Historic Site of Canada in 1987, its centennial anniversary, for its undisturbed natural areas, among them the wetlands, shoreline, forest, and adjacent grasslands, and for being the first bird sanctuary in Canada.

== History ==
In 1887, Lieutenant-Governor of the North-West Territories Edgar Dewdney recommended the establishment of an area to protect wild fowl. On 8 June 1887, an Order in Council established the Dominion bird reserve at Last Mountain Lake. It was the first bird sanctuary established in North America. A parcel of land of about 2,500 acres (10 km^{2}) was reserved as a breeding ground, encompassing the northernmost 27 kilometres (17 mi) of the lake's shoreline. In 1917, it was officially named Last Mountain Lake Bird Sanctuary, and was managed and operated by the Fish and Game League. In 1921, it was protected under the federal Migratory Birds Convention Act.

== Description ==
Last Mountain Lake Bird Sanctuary is located in the northern mixed grasslands, It is characterised by mud flats used by shorebirds and marshes used by waterfowl at the north end of the lake, whose water level is managed "within a series of basin" by control structures built by Ducks Unlimited Canada. A dam at the south end of the lake is used to control overall water depth.

The shoreline is primarily sandy, interspersed with rocky or gravelly tracts, and features numerous peninsulas forming bays between them. The shallow marshes also feature potholes and saline wetlands that support the reeds lining the shore. Throughout the lake are several natural islands. The surrounding uplands consist of native prairie and low-lying grassland, much of it alkaline.

Access to the migratory bird sanctuary is permitted, with seven roads connecting to the site. The site is subject to the federal Migratory Bird Sanctuary Regulations, which prohibits hunting migratory birds, or destroying, disturbing, or removing migratory bird nests and eggs. Permitted activities include hiking, fishing (subject to provincial regulations), and boating.

== Fauna ==
The autumn North American bird migration sees as many as 400,000 anatidae and 75,000 sandhill cranes stopping at the site. The lake's islands also support various prairie bird and waterfowl species that nest in colonies. The whooping crane, an endangered species, has been recorded to use the lake as a staging area during its migration.

Numerous fish species inhabit the lake, which "provides some of the richest spawning and nursery grounds in Saskatchewan", including the vulnerable species bigmouth buffalo, a filter-feeding fish. The land surrounding the lake is inhabited by various prairie mammals, and is used by deer as a wintering site.

== National Historic Site ==
On 24 June 1987, the Last Mountain Lake Bird Sanctuary was officially recognized as a National Historic Site of Canada. The dedication ceremony was presided by Prince Philip, Duke of Edinburgh. The designation was granted primarily because it was the first sanctuary "to afford protection to migratory birds" that had been established in Canada. Among the elements cited for the designation are undisturbed natural features, including the wetlands, water and shoreline, forest, and adjoining grasslands. Also cited were managed features, including the dam and other water control features, and nearby crop fields that lure birds.

== See also ==
- List of National Historic Sites of Canada in Saskatchewan
- List of protected areas of Saskatchewan
- List of Migratory Bird Sanctuaries of Canada
- Valeport Marsh
