= Carrot River (Saskatchewan) =

River in Western Canada

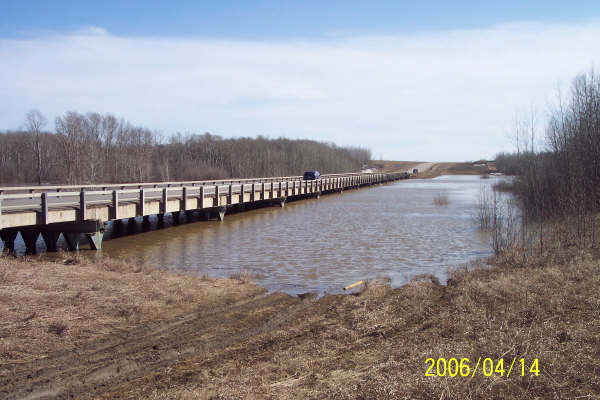
- Highway 23 bridge over the Carrot River during the 2006 flood near the town of Carrot River

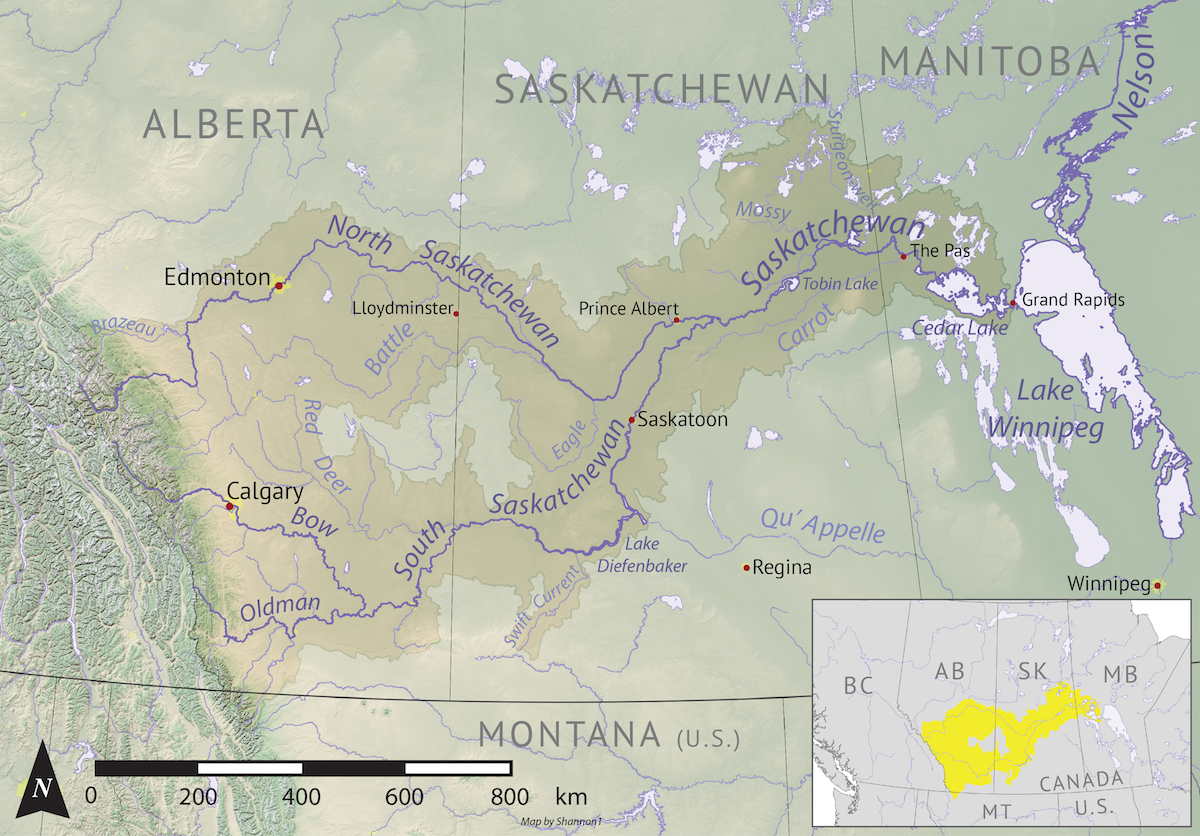
- Map of the Saskatchewan River drainage basin

- Location of the mouth of the Carrot River in Manitoba Carrot River (Saskatchewan) (Canada)

Location
- Country: Canada

Physical characteristics
- Source: Wakaw Lake
  - location: RM of Hoodoo No. 401, Saskatchewan
  - coordinates: 52.7173°N 105.5204°W
  - elevation: 538 m (1,765 ft)
- Mouth: Saskatchewan River, near The Pas, Manitoba
  - location: RM of Kelsey, Manitoba
  - coordinates: 53°50′02″N 101°18′17″W
  - elevation: 264 m (866 ft)
- Basin size: 17,500 km^{2} (6,800 sq mi)

Basin features
- River system: Nelson River
- Tributaries
  - left: Sandhill Creek; Little Bridge Creek; Sipanok Channel; Birch River
  - right: McCloy Creek; Goosehunting Creek; Melfort Creek; Leather River; Jordan River; Papikwan River; Rice River; Nitenal River
- Waterbodies: Tway Lake; Dickson (also spelt Dixon) Lake; Struthers Lake; Saskatchewan River Delta

Carrot River is a river in Western Canada in the north-eastern part Saskatchewan and the north-western part of Manitoba. The outlet of Wakaw Lake in Saskatchewan marks the beginning of the Carrot River and, from there, it flows north-east past several communities and Indian reserves until it joins the Saskatchewan River in the Cumberland Delta in Manitoba. The river's mouth is west and upstream of the Pasquia River and The Pas on the Saskatchewan River.

Historically, Carrot River has been important to local First Nations, early explorers, fur traders, and settlers. Along the river's course and within its watershed, there are National Wildlife Areas, migratory bird sanctuaries, recreational parks, and notable fossil discoveries. Multiple major highways cross the river and provide access to it. The watershed is home to over 25,500 people and covers an area of about 17,500 km^{2} (6,800 sq mi), of which nearly 15,750 km^{2} (6,080 sq mi) is in Saskatchewan. The south-west part of Carrot River's watershed is made up of a terminal basin called Lenore Lake Basin that, while not directly connected to Carrot River, is considered part of its watershed.

== History ==
The Carrot River valley was initially inhabited by Cree and Saulteaux Aboriginal people. English fur trader and explorer Henry Kelsey explored the river in the summer of 1691. Louis de la Corne, Chevalier de la Corne and Anthony Henday also explored the valley during the 1750s.

== Description ==
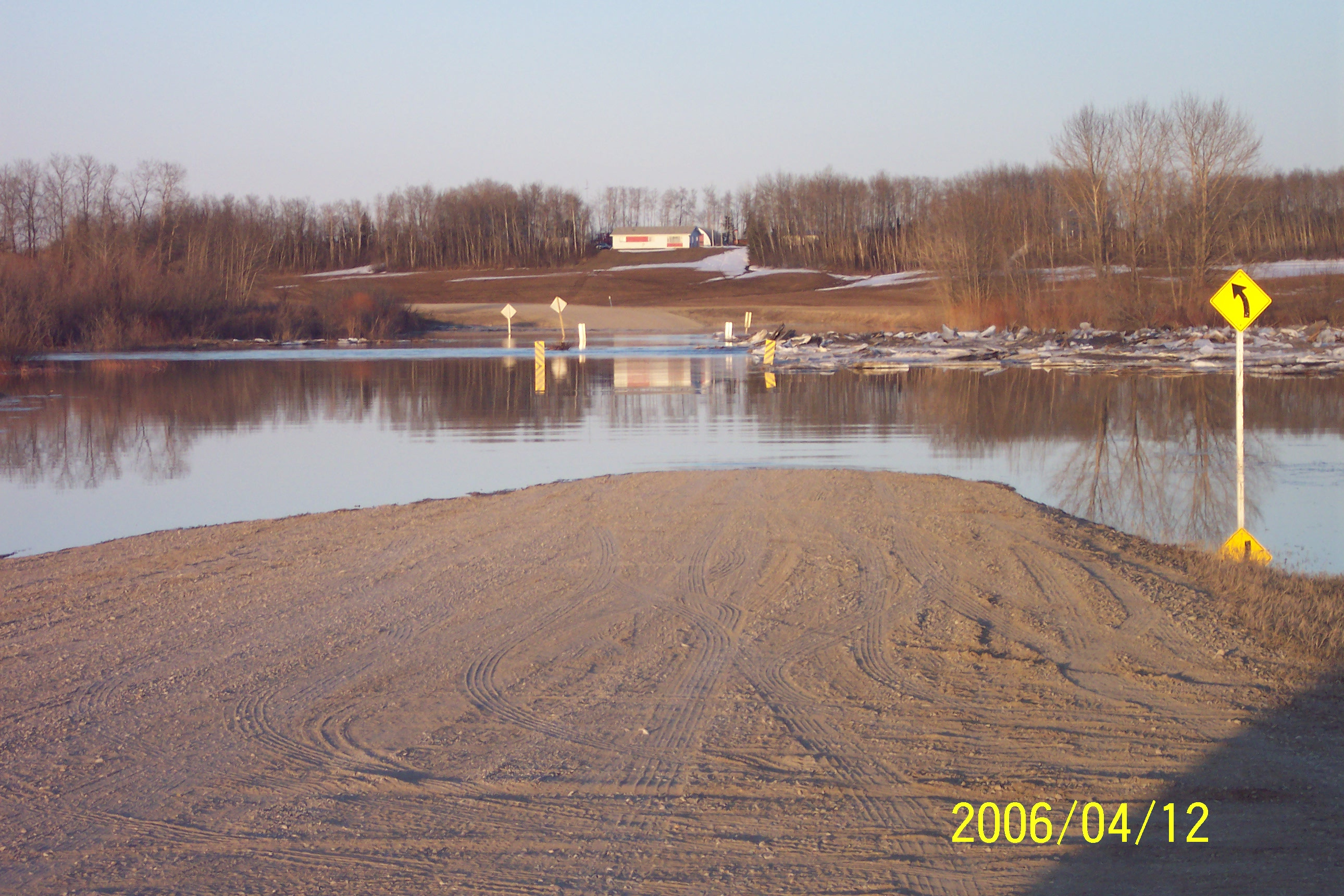
The river flooding a bridge east of the town of Carrot River

Carrot River's headwaters originate in the Cudworth and Tiger Hill Plains near the town of Wakaw, Saskatchewan and its mouth is in the Saskatchewan River Delta near The Pas, Manitoba. The river begins at the eastern end of Wakaw Lake and flows north-east into Manitoba, paralleling the course of the South Saskatchewan and Saskatchewan Rivers. At no point is the Carrot River farther than 50 kilometres (31 mi) from either of those river. The Pasquia Hills make up much of the river's southern watershed boundary. Carrot River is about 300 kilometres (190 mi) in length and serves as the main watershed (which, at its maximum, is about 80 kilometres (50 mi) wide) for north-eastern Saskatchewan.

Some of the notable parks and protected areas in Carrot River's watershed include Tway National Wildlife Area, Raven Island National Wildlife Area, Lenore Lake Migratory Bird Sanctuary, Basin and Middle Lakes Migratory Bird Sanctuary, Ingvald Opseth Wildlife Refuge, Wildcat Hill Provincial Park, Mountain Cabin Recreation Site, Pasquia Regional Park, Rice River Canyon Ecological Reserve, and Pasquia Hills North Recreation Site.

Communities along Carrot River's course include Tway, Crystal Springs, Kinistino, Fairy Glen, Ridgedale, Red Earth First Nation, Shoal Lake Cree Nation, and Pasquia. Melfort, while not along the course of the river, is the only city within the drainage basin. Major highways that cross the river include Highways 20, 3, 6, 35, 23, 55, and 9. Once Saskatchewan's Highway 9 reaches the border with Manitoba, it becomes Manitoba's Provincial Road 283. Provincial Road 283 follows the Carrot River to its mouth at the Saskatchewan River, upstream from The Pas.

=== Tributaries ===
The Carrot River's tributaries from its source at Wakaw Lake in Saskatchewan to its mouth at the Saskatchewan River, upstream from The Pas, Manitoba:

- McCloy Creek
  - Coldwell Creek
- Goosehunting Creek
- Melfort Creek
- Sweetwater Creek
- Sandhill Creek
- Little Bridge Creek
- Leather River
  - Doghide River
  - Presbyterian River
  - Trapper Creek
  - Crooked River
- Burntout Brook
- Jordan River
- Emmons Creek
- Connell Creek
- Papikwan River
  - Redwillow Creek
    - Fournier Creek
- Kennedy Creek
- Cracking River
- Red Earth Creek
  - Halfway Creek
  - Man River
- McVey Creek
- Rice River
- Sipanok Channel
- Nitenal River
  - Mountain Creek
- Culdesac River
- Birch River
  - Petabec Creek
    - Sapaskoo Creek
  - Junction Creek
    - Mink Creek
      - Bloodsucker Creek
        - Cut Beaver River
          - Dragline Channel — a man-made channel connecting the Carrot River watershed to the Saskatchewan River
  - Dead Moose Creek

== Lenore Lake basin ==
At the south-western most point of Carrot River's watershed is the terminal Lenore Lake basin. It consists of 15 individual lakes, two of which are fresh water while the others are salt water. The more prominent salt lakes include Basin, Lenore, Middle, Frog, Ranch, Murphy, Flat, Mantrap, Houghton, Deadmoose, and Waldsea. The two fresh water lakes are St. Brieux and Burton. The basin is in the aspen parkland ecozone of Saskatchewan and its lakes are important for various birds and other wildlife. As such, large sections of the basin have been carved out as protected areas. Lenore Lake has been designated an Important Bird Area of Canada and a migratory bird sanctuary. At the southern end of the lake is Raven Island, which is a National Wildlife Area of Canada. Basin Lake and neighbouring Middle Lake have also been designated as an Important Bird Area and migratory bird sanctuary.

== Fossils and historical finds ==
During the 1980s, the Royal Saskatchewan Museum explored the banks and rock edges of the Carrot River, because a local farmer had been finding numerous fossils in that area. The tests on the found fossils showed them to be approximately 92 million years old. The sites along the Carrot River proved to be some of the wealthiest deposits of fossils and showed deposits from numerous other species including sharks and fish.

The most notable find was in 1991, when the Royal Saskatchewan Museum and the Canadian Museum of Nature unearthed the six-metre fossil skeleton of an ancient crocodile, a Terminonaris robustus specimen named "Big Bert". Big Bert turned out to be very well-preserved and the only one of its kind found in Canada. They also found a complete fossil of Xiphactinus and toothed birds.

== Tway National Wildlife Area ==
Tway National Wildlife Area (52.7584°N 105.4172°W) is a 2.5 km^{2} (0.97 sq mi) National Wildlife Area (NWA) along the course of the Carrot River in the RM of Invergordon No. 430. By 1970, three-quarters of the marshland in the area had been drained. In 1971, to help restore the marshland, Canadian Wildlife Service acquired land for a Ducks Unlimited Canada project. The project included flood control, raising water levels, and improve haying and grazing for neighbouring farmers. The NWA is north of the community of Tway along Carrot River's course from the eastern shore of Tway Lake eastward coving the marshland. The NWA is an important habitat for birds, such as Canada geese, grebes, coots, owls, and song birds.

== Pasquia Regional Park ==
Pasquia Regional Park (53.1889°N 103.5796°W) is a regional park along the course of the Carrot River in the RM of Arborfield No. 456, downstream and east of where the Burntout Brook meets it. The park is on the northern bank of the river and has a campground with over 200 campsites, a golf course, licensed restaurant, mini golf, junior Olympic sized swimming pool, river access, and hiking trails. The Dickson Hardie Interpretive Centre that houses "Big Bert" is at the park. It is about 9.5 kilometres (5.9 mi) south of the town of Carrot River and access is from Highway 23.

Pasquia Park Golf Club is a 9-hole course with grass greens. There is a driving range and it is a par 37 with 3,241 yards. There is a licensed club house with cart and club rentals.

== Fish species ==
Fish commonly found in the river include walleye, yellow perch, northern pike, burbot, and white sucker.

== See also ==
- List of rivers of Manitoba
- List of rivers of Saskatchewan
- Hudson Bay drainage basin
- List of protected areas of Saskatchewan
