= Lenore Lake =

Lake in Saskatchewan, Canada

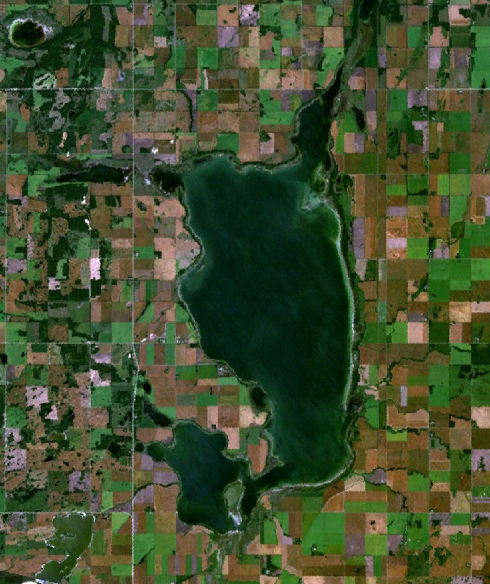
- Lenore Lake as seen from space

- Location in Saskatchewan Lenore Lake (Canada)
- Location: RM of Lenore Lake No. 399 and RM of Three Lakes No. 400 in Saskatchewan
- Coordinates: 52°30′N 104°59′W
- Type: Salt lake
- Part of: Saskatchewan River drainage basin
- Primary inflows: Lenore Brook
- Primary outflows: None
- Basin countries: Canada
- Surface area: 7,474.2 ha (18,469 acres)
- Average depth: 5.2 m (17 ft)
- Max. depth: 10.4 m (34 ft)
- Shore length^{1}: 81.5 km (50.6 mi)
- Surface elevation: 522 m (1,713 ft)
- Islands: Raven Island
- Settlements: None
- ^{1} Shore length is not a well-defined measure.

Lenore Lake is a partly saline lake in the Canadian province of Saskatchewan. It is part of the Lenore Lake basin, which includes several saline lakes (Basin, Middle, Frog, Ranch, Murphy, Flat, Mantrap, Houghton, Deadmoose, and Waldsea) as well as the fresh water St. Brieux and Burton Lakes. The basin is part of the Carrot River watershed but has no natural outlet. The lake is within the aspen parkland ecozone of Saskatchewan. Lenore Lake was designated a migratory bird sanctuary in 1925. Raven Island (52.4417°N 105.0005°W), located at the southern end of Lenore Lake, is a National Wildlife Area of Canada.

Lenore Lake is relatively shallow and is prone to severe water level fluctuations as it is dependent upon seasonal rains and spring runoff. As water levels recede during the summer, extensive mudflats develop along the shore. These mudflats provide habitat for birds and the lake itself is an Important Bird Area (IBA) of Canada part of Lenore Lake Migratory Bird Sanctuary (MBS). Directly to the north-west is another MBS at Basin and Middle Lakes. At the north-east corner of Lenore Lake is Lenore Lake Wildlife Refuge (52.5334°N 104.9505°W).

== Lake Lenore IBA ==
Lake Lenore (SK 074) is an Important Bird Area (IBA) of Canada that covers an area of 236.4 km^{2} (91.3 sq mi) and includes all of Lenore Lake and its shoreline. The lake is an important staging area for about 80,000 ducks and 40,000 geese during the fall migration. During the summer, about 4,000 ducks use the lake as a moulting area. This habitat is also important to other birds such as the piping plover, ruddy turnstone, double-crested cormorant, and the American white pelican.

== Environmental concerns ==
In recent years, water levels in the basin have risen to historic levels. Nearby Houghton Lake, a highly saline body of water, has drained water into Lenore Lake. To prevent the highly saline water from damaging the fish habitat in Lenore Lake, Environment Canada ordered the permanent closure of a culvert between the two lakes on May 10, 2010.

In 2009, Saskatchewan's Ministry of the Environment issued fish consumption guidelines for walleye and northern pike taken from Lenore Lake, due to the level of mercury detected in the fish.

== Fish species ==
Fish commonly found in Lenore Lake include walleye, whitefish, perch, and northern pike.

== See also ==
- List of lakes of Saskatchewan
- List of Migratory Bird Sanctuaries of Canada
- List of protected areas of Saskatchewan
