= Lucien Lake =

Lake in Saskatchewan, Canada

- Location in Saskatchewan Lucien Lake (Canada)
- Location: RM of Three Lakes No. 400, Saskatchewan
- Coordinates: 52.4883°N 105.3192°W
- Part of: Saskatchewan River drainage basin
- Primary outflows: None
- Basin countries: Canada
- Surface area: 102.6 ha (254 acres)
- Max. depth: 12.5 m (41 ft)
- Shore length^{1}: 7.2 km (4.5 mi)
- Surface elevation: 573 m (1,880 ft)
- Settlements: Middle Lake
- ^{1} Shore length is not a well-defined measure.

Lucien Lake is a small recreational lake in the Canadian province of Saskatchewan. It is located in the RM of Three Lakes No. 400 in the aspen parkland ecoregion of Canada. On the lake's south-eastern shore is a regional park and to the east of that is the village of Middle Lake. Along the western shore are houses and Prairie Sky Resort campground. Access to the lake and its amenities is from Highway 777, which connects to Highway 20.

== Lucien Lake Regional Park ==
Lucien Lake Regional Park (52.4788°N 105.3162°W) is a heavily wooded, 35-acre park located on the south-eastern shore of Lucien Lake. It was founded in 1967 and has a campground, sandy beach, ball diamonds, mini golf, picnic area, and a boat launch. The campground has modern washrooms and showers, electric and water hook-ups, and a sani-dump station. The neighbouring retirement home — Bethany Pioneer Village — has nature trails accessible from the park and is open to the general public.

== Fish species ==
Fish commonly found in Lucien Lake include yellow perch, northern pike, and walleye. The lake stocked regularly with walleye fry.

== See also ==
- List of lakes of Saskatchewan
- Tourism in Saskatchewan
