= Rural Municipality of Last Mountain Valley No. 250 =

Rural municipality in Saskatchewan, Canada

Last Mountain Valley No. 250
- Rural municipality
- Rural Municipality of Last Mountain Valley No. 250
- Location of the RM of Last Mountain Valley No. 250 in Saskatchewan
- Coordinates: 51.259°N 105.210°W
- Country: Canada
- Province: Saskatchewan
- Census division: 11
- SARM division: 5
- Formed: December 13, 1909

Government
  - Reeve: Allan Magel
  - Governing body: RM of Last Mountain Valley No. 250 Council
  - Administrator: Kelly Holbrook
  - Office location: Govan

Area (2016)
  - Land: 871.17 km^{2} (336.36 sq mi)

Population (2016)
  - Total: 275
  - Density: 0.3/km^{2} (0.78/sq mi)
- Time zone: CST
  - Summer (DST): CST
- Area codes: 306 and 639

The Rural Municipality of Last Mountain Valley No. 250 (2016 population: 275) is a rural municipality (RM) in the Canadian province of Saskatchewan within Census Division No. 11 and SARM Division No. 5.

== History ==
The RM of Last Mountain Valley No. 250 incorporated as a rural municipality on December 13, 1909.

=== Arlington Beach House ===
Arlington Beach House was one of the first hotels built in Saskatchewan and was one of the first buildings constructed along Last Mountain Lake. This once luxury hotel was built in 1910 at Arlington Beach, Saskatchewan by the William Pearson Land Company as their centre of operations in Saskatchewan. It was a popular vacation destination for people all across central Saskatchewan.

== Geography ==
=== Communities and localities ===
The following urban municipalities are surrounded by the RM.

Towns

- Govan

Villages

- Duval

The following unincorporated communities are within the RM.

Organized hamlets

- Arlington Beach

Localities

- Cymric

== Last Mountain ==
Last Mountain is a hilly plateau mostly within the south-east corner of the RM of Last Mountain Valley. A portion of the southern slope is in the RM of McKillop and a portion of the eastern slope is in the RM of Longlaketon. Duval is the closest community, directly to the west, and Strasbourg, to the south-west, is the closest town.

The Legend of Last Mountain is a Plains Indians legend of how the area's land got its shape. It states that after the Great Chief finished building all the hills on the prairies there was left-over dirt, which he used to create Last Mountain. That was the last land he built, and the neighbouring lake, Last Mountain Lake, was the last lake to be filled.

When the Great Chief of the world completed the building of all the hills, he found he had a little material left over and he looked about to see where he should put it. He saw that the prairie lay smooth and level and for many days journey, unbroken by mountain, lake, or stream.

"What fitter place than this to lay good soil?" he said, and in the midst of the prairie he built a mound with what dirt remained and, scooping a hollow with his hand, he made the water left over from the rivers a long lake. And he breathed on it so that the grass and trees grew, and the birds and buffalo came to rest in the shade.

All that was wanting was a name, so the Great Chief lifted up his voice and summoned all his braves and they came on wings like the eagle, greeting their chief with a shout like thunder booming among the hills. Then from their ranks steeped Cheewana, daughter of the great chieftain, beautiful as the summer morning, wise as a beaver and she bent at his feet.

And she said, "Because this mountain was the last of thy making and this lake is the last of thy filling, I offer you for the one the name of Last Mountain and for the other that of Last Mountain Lake."

That legend was first published by William Pearson Publishing Company Ltd. Of Winnipeg c. 1911. It was an exerpt from a pamphlet called "Last Mountain Lake Saskatchewan's Summer Resort".

== Last Mountain Regional Park ==
Last Mountain Regional Park (51.351°N 105.217°W) is a regional park at the far north-west corner of the RM within the Last Mountain Lake Bird Sanctuary, along the eastern shore of Last Mountain Lake. Founded in 1963, it is one of Saskatchewan's oldest regional parks. It is located about 15 kilometres (9.3 mi) west of Govan, off Highway 20.

The park features access to the bird sanctuary and Last Mountain Lake National Wildlife Area, which is a Ramsar site. Saskatchewan's only bird observatory is located in the park.

There is also beach access to the lake for swimming, fishing, and water sports.

The park offers seasonal and daily camping, as well as private cabins, an outdoor pool, aquatic programme, shower house, laundry, nine-hole sand green golf course, sand volleyball court, and a concession.

== Demographics ==
Population history (1981–2016)
Year	Pop.	±%
1981	540	—
1986	460	−14.8%
1991	430	−6.5%
1996	395	−8.1%
2001	376	−4.8%
2006	362	−3.7%
2011	267	−26.2%
2016	275	+3.0%
Source: Statistics Canada via Saskatchewan Bureau of Statistics

In the 2021 Census of Population conducted by Statistics Canada, the RM of Last Mountain Valley No. 250 had a population of 339 living in 154 of its 306 total private dwellings, a change of 23.3% from its 2016 population of 275. With a land area of 858.96 km^{2} (331.65 sq mi), it had a population density of 0.4/km^{2} (1.0/sq mi) in 2021.

In the 2016 Census of Population, the RM of Last Mountain Valley No. 250 recorded a population of 275 living in 127 of its 308 total private dwellings, a 3% change from its 2011 population of 267. With a land area of 871.17 km^{2} (336.36 sq mi), it had a population density of 0.3/km^{2} (0.8/sq mi) in 2016.

== Government ==
The RM of Last Mountain Valley No. 250 is governed by an elected municipal council and an appointed administrator that meets on the second Thursday of every month. The reeve of the RM is Allan Magel while its administrator is Kelly Holbrook. The RM's office is located in Govan.

== Transportation ==
- Highway 20
- Canadian Pacific Railway

== See also ==
- List of rural municipalities in Saskatchewan
