= Hoey, Saskatchewan =

Coordinates: 52°52′02″N 105°47′42″W

Hoey in Saskatchewan

Hoey is a hamlet in the Canadian province of Saskatchewan in the rural municipality of St. Louis No. 431, Saskatchewan.

== Demographics ==
In the 2021 Census of Population conducted by Statistics Canada, Hoey had a population of 53 living in 24 of its 26 total private dwellings, a change of 17.8% from its 2016 population of 45. With a land area of 0.33 km^{2} (0.13 sq mi), it had a population density of 160.6/km^{2} (416.0/sq mi) in 2021.
