= Yellow Creek, Saskatchewan =

Yellow Creek
- Special service area
- Special Service Area of Yellow Creek
- Location within Saskatchewan Location within Canada
- Coordinates: 52.75°N 105.24°W
- Country: Canada
- Province: Saskatchewan
- Post office founded: N/A
- Incorporated (village): N/A
- Incorporated (town): N/A

Government

Population
  - Total: 45
- Time zone: CST

Yellow Creek is a special service area located in the parkland area of east-central Saskatchewan within the Rural Municipality of Invergordon No. 430. It previously held the status of village until August 15, 2009. The community is located northeast of Wakaw on Highway 41. It is named after the creek that flows through it. The area consists mostly of Ukrainians and Hungarians.

== Demographics ==
In the 2021 Census of Population conducted by Statistics Canada, Yellow Creek had a population of 35 living in 23 of its 29 total private dwellings, a change of −22.2% from its 2016 population of 45. With a land area of 0.52 km^{2} (0.20 sq mi), it had a population density of 67.3/km^{2} (174.3/sq mi) in 2021.

== See also ==
- List of communities in Saskatchewan
