= Lockwood, Saskatchewan =

Hamlet in Saskatchewan, Canada

Coordinates: 51.65006°N 105.01783°W

Lockwood is a former village in the Canadian province of Saskatchewan. It was dissolved in 2002; its population is now counted as part of the Rural Municipality of Usborne No. 310. Lockwood is located on Highway 20 15 kilometres (9.3 mi) north of the town of Nokomis.

== History ==
Prior to January 1, 2002, Lockwood was incorporated as a village, and was restructured as a hamlet under the jurisdiction of the RM of Usborne on that date.

== Demographics ==
In the 2021 Census of Population conducted by Statistics Canada, Lockwood had a population of 5 living in 7 of its 8 total private dwellings, a change of -66.7% from its 2016 population of 15. With a land area of 0.73 km^{2} (0.28 sq mi), it had a population density of 6.8/km^{2} (17.7/sq mi) in 2021.

== See also ==
- List of communities in Saskatchewan
- List of hamlets in Saskatchewan
