= Jumping Lake =

Lake in Saskatchewan, Canada

- Location in Saskatchewan Jumping Lake (Canada)
- Location: RM of Invergordon No. 430, Saskatchewan
- Coordinates: 52°51′N 105°27′W
- Type: Endorheic lake
- Part of: Saskatchewan River drainage basin
- Primary outflows: None
- Basin countries: Canada
- Surface area: 1,057.6 ha (2,613 acres)
- Max. depth: 7.4 m (24 ft)
- Shore length^{1}: 12.9 km (8.0 mi)
- Surface elevation: 495 m (1,624 ft)
- Settlements: Waitville
- ^{1} Shore length is not a well-defined measure.

Jumping Lake is a shallow endorheic lake in the Canadian province of Saskatchewan. The lake is about 14 kilometres (8.7 mi) south of the town of Birch Hills in the RM of Invergordon No. 430. It is a fresh water lake that is a stopping point for migrating geese and ducks and is used locally for migratory bird hunting and fishing.

In the mid decades of the twentieth century, a beach and recreational facilities existed at the lake frequented by area locals, but these have since been abandoned. The village of Waitville was also once found at the eastern edge of the lake which has disappeared for the most part. The countryside surrounding Jumping Lake is typical of the aspen parkland biome of which it is a part.

== Fish species ==
Fish commonly found in Jumping Lake include northern pike and walleye. It is periodically stocked with walleye fry. Due to the shallowness of the lake, the fish occasionally suffer from winterkill.

== See also ==
- List of lakes of Saskatchewan
