= Last Mountain Lake National Wildlife Area =

NWA site in Saskatchewan, Canada

- IUCN category IV (habitat/species management area)
- Location within Saskatchewan Location within Canada
- Location: RM of Wreford No. 280, Saskatchewan, Canada
- Coordinates: 51°22′00″N 105°14′02″W
- Area: 15,602 ha (60.24 sq mi)
- Designation: National Wildlife Area
- Established: 1987
- Governing body: Canadian Wildlife Service
- Owner: Environment and Climate Change Canada

Last Mountain Lake National Wildlife Area is a National Wildlife Area (NWA) in the Canadian province of Saskatchewan. The protected area is in the Prairie Pothole Region of North America, which extends throughout three Canadian provinces and five U.S. states. It is also within Palliser's Triangle and the Great Plains ecoregion. The site is an Important Bird Area (IBA) of Canada, designated as Last Mountain Lake NWA (SK 001). Last Mountain Lake National Wildlife Area is located at the north end of Last Mountain Lake, 15 kilometres (9.3 mi) west of Govan. The majority of the park is in the RM of Wreford No. 280. The area has been designated as a National Wildlife Area which is protected under the Canada Wildlife Act.

== History ==
Last Mountain Lake, also known as Long Lake, was named after a Cree oral history which recounts the Great Spirit digging out the soil and forming a valley (now known as Last Mountain Lake), and with that soil creating the hills found in the nearby area. Historically, Indigenous peoples would visit the area during the fall months to fish for northern pike and whitefish in Long Lake and hunt bison, which was key to their livelihoods.

In 1869, the Hudson's Bay Company built a trading post on the south end of the lake, known as Last Mountain House, with settlers following by 1885. Known today for its rich biodiversity and ecological productivity, the Last Mountain Lake region was once home to great buffalo herds and was located within the great bison belt.

Recognized for its importance as a remote breeding habitat for birds, Last Mountain Lake Wildlife Area became federally protected in 1887. The protected area originally consisted of just 1,025 hectares (2,530 acres) located on the northern end of Last Mountain Lake. It was designated Ramsar site No. 239 on May 24, 1982. In 1987, 100 years after first being protected as a bird sanctuary, the Last Mountain Lake National Wildlife Area was officially established and encompassed 15,602 hectares (38,550 acres) of marsh, grasslands, and uplands.

This area was North America's first federally protected bird sanctuary and today consists of 10,906 hectares (26,950 acres), remaining the oldest bird sanctuary in North America. The area is a National Historic site and overlaps with Last Mountain Lake Migratory Bird Sanctuary, Last Mountain Lake NWA Western Hemisphere Shorebird Reserve Network (WHSRN), and Last Mountain Lake NWA – Important Bird Area (IBA).

== Land composition ==
The protected area includes several small islands, including Bird, Royal, and Coney. The northernmost inlet for Last Mountain Lake, Lanigan Creek and its tributary Saline Creek, runs through the heart of the park. Several dykes were built to help control water flow and levels. Natural grasslands make up about 54% of the total protected area. The marshes and grasslands provide habitat and breeding grounds for about 280 species of migratory birds. 1,200 hectares (3,000 acres) of the park is dominated by native species. Within the park, there are trails, a picnic area, a Nature Centre, and Last Mountain Bird Observatory, Saskatchewan's only bird monitoring station.

The area has a mix of different habitats which are separated into three designations.

=== Upland ecosites ===
The upland ecosites are mainly composed of loamy to sandy grasslands and make up about 67% of the protected area. These areas have a variety of different grasses that can grow, including wheatgrass and western porcupine grass. While these areas mainly have grasses and non-native weeds growing in the present day, they were used as agricultural land in the past because of the soil composition. Several different trees and shrubs including trembling aspen, willow, and thorny buffaloberry also find the soil composition easy to grow in and have been able to thrive in these areas.

=== Lowland ecosites ===
In the lowland ecosites, which make up 33% of the protected area, saline soils and clays can be found. The composition of the soil is dependent on environmental factors such as wind, beaches, surrounding springs, and basins. Lowland ecosites can have three different compositions, dry saline soils, saline wetlands, and freshwater wetlands. Each of these composition types will have different varieties of plants found within them.

=== Aquatic habitats ===
Aquatic habitats (approximately 4,300 hectares (11,000 acres)) include streams, dugouts, deep marshes, and artificial reservoirs. Snow runoff and evaporation rates will affect the flow rates of these areas. Sufficient water flow and quality can provide spawning areas for fish in creeks and streams.

=== Land use ===
This Wildlife Area is now being protected but it used to be dominated by cultivated ground for crop production. Migratory birds and wildlife use the lake's shallow bays for migration routes, nesting, and roosting cover. The Canadian management plan in place has allowed the use of prescribed fire and water management programs to be tested and is now being used to benefit the area. The boundaries of the national wildlife area were originally put in place to protect wild fowl breeding grounds.

== Climate ==
Climate in this region of Saskatchewan involves long, warm summers and frigid, snowy, and dry winters. Temperatures habitually vary between -19 °C to 26 °C and very rarely dip below -32 °C or above 32 °C. Low humidity levels are experienced throughout the entire year; its levels do not vary significantly.

Rainfall and snowfall rates vary throughout the year; the rainy portion of the year lasts just over six months, from April to October, with June being the rainiest month at an average of 56 millimetres of rainfall. The snowy portion of the year lasts for around six months as well, from April to October, with December being the snowiest month at an average of 60 millimetres of snowfall.

Scenarios of how climate change will affect the Saskatchewan area were established following the most recent assessment on global climate change by the Intergovernmental Panel on Climate Change (IPCC), using the most recent global climate model results available. This analysis includes the grassland regions of Saskatchewan and indicated decreases in annual mean precipitation within these regions going forward. For the 2020s (2020-2039) and 2050s (2040-2069), changes in the range of annual mean precipitation are predicted to be between -10% and +25%, and between -5% and +35% for the 2080s (2070-2099) Temperatures are predicted to rise between 0.5 and 3 °C for the 2020s, between 1 and 5 °C for the 2050s, and between 2 and 6.5 °C for the 2080s. Winter and spring are predicted to see the largest range of temperature increase at between 1 and 6 °C, compared to summer and fall at 1 to 4 °C. The province of Saskatchewan is expected to experience increased severity and frequency of extreme weather events such as droughts, flooding, and forest fires.

== Flora and fauna ==
=== Plant life ===
Last Mountain Lake National Wildlife Area contains approximately 318 plant species in 58 families. Seven of these plant species are identified as rare for the Saskatchewan area. Aspen trees and willow trees are the only endemic trees in the area and are quite scarce. Shrubs are present in sufficiently moist hollows within the area.

One native grassland complex that encompasses about a tenth of the area is mainly composed of northern rough fescue and spear grass, with herbaceous species also present including holden bean, northern bedstraw, crocus Anemone, low goldenrod, yellow toadflax, and western snowberry. Degrees of alkalinity and slope determine what dominant plants are present.

Moisture-tolerant species encompass a lowland complex that covers just over 12% of the area. Mid-slope sites are composed of smooth blue beardtongue, bastard toadflax, early blue violet, and northern bedstraw as dominants. Mid-lower slopes contain northern rough fescue, Kentucky blue grass, and green needle grass as dominants. Lower slopes see Kentucky blue grass, northern reed grass, graceful sedge, and northern wheatgrass as dominants. Soil salinity is associated with the following dominant grasses: Salt grass, wild barley, and slender wheatgrass. Salt grass and Nuttals' salt-meadow grass are best supported by highly saline areas.

A third complex that covers 2% of the area and that is found in wet meadows is composed of wild barley, beaked sedge, awned sedge, and spangletop.

Alkaline wetlands make up a fourth complex that covers approximately 1% of the area. When these areas dry out, which occurs frequently, a white alkali flat ringed with red samphire, wild barley, Nuttals' salt-meadow grass, salt grass, and sea-milkwort is left behind. Sedges and reed grass make up the wetland edge vegetation, with the principal emergents being bulrush and cattail.

The springs in the northern portion of the area are surrounded by raised bogs that best support cattails, sedges, and northern grass of Parnassus. The blue-green algae species Anabaena, Anacystis, and Aphanizomenon are crucial to the area.

=== Birds ===
Last Mountain Lake National Wildlife Area experiences a wealth of birdlife. The wide array of birdlife in the Last Mountain Lake National Wildlife Area can be attributed to it being one of the most productive lakes in southern Saskatchewan and to it being located in the heart of the Central Flyway of North America. Large populations of birds use the region’s habitats as they cross the Great Plains. During migration, more than 300 bird species have been documented in the Last Mountain Lake National Wildlife Area. Throughout peak migration, up to 50,000 cranes, 450,000 geese, and several hundred thousand ducks can be visible. It is a vital breeding ground for approximately 100 bird species that are unique to the prairie region, as well as a nesting ground for nine species of shorebirds, 43 species of songbirds, and 13 species of ducks. Some of these include western grebe, American white pelican, American avocet, and Wilson's phalarope.

At the north end of the lake, Ducks Unlimited Canada has constructed water control structures that provide supplementary marsh habitat for waterfowl and mud flats for shorebirds.

When it comes to threatened, endangered, and vulnerable bird species, many of them rely on the National Wildlife Area’s legal protection. These birds occupy several islands on the lake as well as floating platforms in the marsh. Nine of Canada's 36 classified species by the Committee on the Status of Endangered Wildlife in Canada (COSEWIC) have satisfactory habitat within the Last Mountain Lake National Wildlife Area. These species include peregrine falcon, piping plover, whooping crane, Sprague’s pipit, ferruginous hawk, loggerhead shrike, Baird’s sparrow, Caspian tern, and Cooper’s hawk.

=== Other wildlife ===
In addition to migratory birds, the Last Mountain Lake National Wildlife Area is also utilized by other wildlife including sharp-tailed grouse, Hungarian partridge, red fox, badgers, coyotes, white-tailed jackrabbits, and white-tailed deer. Important fish spawning areas are found within the marshes, streams, and shallow waters of the lake. These aquatic areas support approximately 18 fish species including bigmouth buffalo, which is considered a vulnerable species. Plankton are crucial in the area’s aquatic food chain.

=== Threats ===
There are numerous invasive species present, which are considered one of the main threats to the area. These species include smooth brome grass, Kentucky blue grass, quack grass, toadflax, nodding thistle, and sweet clover. Other main threats to the area include gravel extraction, habitat fragmentation, and other human influences.

== Regulations ==
To protect the flora and fauna of the area, there are rules and regulations put in place restricting access to certain activities. Authorized activities include:

- Driving and cycling on gravel roads, designated interpretive trails, and boardwalks
- Canoeing, kayaking, and other non-motorized boating on the internal basins except during the waterbird breeding seasons (May–July)
- Sport hunting and fishing with certain restrictions
- Non-commercial berry
- Hiking along designated trails, roads, and boardwalks
- Cross country skiing, snowshoeing, and skating
- Swimming
- Wildlife viewing

Activities that are prohibited include:

- Sport hunting with a commercial guide
- Camping
- Use of motorized boats

These regulations are put in place to protect the wildlife and plant species' habitats as well as the lives of the people who visit. Environment and Climate Change Canada's Wildlife Enforcement Directorate (ECCC-WED) officers are put in place to ensure the compliance with these regulations among all visitors to the park.

The management plan not only restricts activities available to the public, it also implements restorative and conservative strategies that benefit the habitat and species of the area. Beneficial activities in the management plan include:

- Monitoring wildlife
- Maintaining and improving wildlife habitat
  1. Removing invasive plant species
  2. Prepare soil for planting
  3. Prescribed fire
- Periodic inspections
- Enforcement of regulations
  1. Restricted sport hunting
- Maintenance of facilities and infrastructure
- Research

== See also ==
- List of protected areas of Saskatchewan
- Tourism in Saskatchewan
- Valeport Marsh
