= Tarnopol, Saskatchewan =

Community in Saskatchewan, Canada

Tarnopol
- Unincorporated community
- Location of Tarnopol in Saskatchewan
- Coordinates: 52°42′00″N 105°23′02″W
- Country: Canada
- Province: Saskatchewan
- Region: Saskatchewan
- Census division: Division No. 15
- Rural Municipality: Invergordon

Population (2006)
  - Total: 5
- Area code: 306
- Highways: Highway 20

Tarnopol is an unincorporated community in Saskatchewan, Canada, located 50 kilometres (31 mi) southwest of the city of Melfort. It was settled mostly by Ukrainian and Polish immigrants in the early 1900s. Tarnopol gets its name from the city of Ternopil, Ukraine, which was originally named Tarnopol. Tarnopol was founded in 1540 by Jan Amor Tarnowski, a Polish nobleman, with the official permission of King Sigismund I the Old, during the era of Kingdom of Poland. The name Tarnopol originates from a blend of its founder’s surname and the Greek word polis, meaning 'city' — together signifying 'Tarnowski's city.'

== See also ==
- List of communities in Saskatchewan
- List of ghost towns in Saskatchewan
