= Beaked sedge =

Beaked sedge is a common name for multiple species of plant and may refer to:

- Carex abrupta, abrupt-beaked sedge or abruptbeak sedge
- Carex rostrata, glaucous beaked sedge or bottle sedge
- Carex sprengelii, long-beaked sedge or Sprengel's sedge
- Carex utriculata, common beaked sedge or Northwest Territory sedge
- Rhynchospora alba, white beaked sedge
