= Middle Lake, Saskatchewan =

Village in Saskatchewan, Canada

Middle Lake
- Village
- Location within Saskatchewan Location within Canada
- Coordinates: 52°28′58″N 105°18′28″W
- Country: Canada
- Province: Saskatchewan
- Census division: 15
- Rural municipality: Three Lakes No. 400

Government
  - Mayor: Ken Herman
  - Administrator: Colette Hauser
  - Councillor: Trevor Otsig
  - Councillor: Kenton Friesen

Area
  - Total: 1.26 km^{2} (0.49 sq mi)

Population (2011)
  - Total: 242
- Time zone: UTC−6 (Central Standard Time)
  - Summer (DST): UTC−5
- Postal code: S0K 2X0
- Area code: 306
- Highways: Highway 20
- Website: http://www.middlelake.ca/

Middle Lake (2016 population: 241) is a village in the Canadian province of Saskatchewan within the Rural Municipality of Three Lakes No. 400 and Census Division No. 15. The village has a public K-12 school, a nursing home, and a regional park. It is adjacent to Lucien Lake and accessed from Highway 20. The surrounding area is largely agricultural.

Middle Lake has multiple volunteer organizations including Three Lakes First Responders, Three Lakes Fire Department, and Lions. Community amenities include a gym, bowling alley, Lucien Lake Regional Park, community hall, senior's centre, skating rink, 4-H, and a music studio.

== History ==
Middle Lake incorporated as a village on January 1, 1963.

== Demographics ==
Population history (1981–2016)
Year	Pop.	±%
1981	275	—
1986	261	−5.1%
1991	245	−6.1%
1996	268	+9.4%
2001	300	+11.9%
2006	277	−7.7%
2011	242	−12.6%
2016	241	−0.4%
Source: Statistics Canada via Saskatchewan Bureau of Statistics

In the 2021 Census of Population conducted by Statistics Canada, Middle Lake had a population of 188 living in 100 of its 115 total private dwellings, a change of −22% from its 2016 population of 241. With a land area of 1.02 km^{2} (0.39 sq mi), it had a population density of 184.3/km^{2} (477.4/sq mi) in 2021.

In the 2016 Census of Population, the Village of Middle Lake recorded a population of 241 living in 113 of its 125 total private dwellings, a −0.4% change from its 2011 population of 242. With a land area of 1.26 km^{2} (0.49 sq mi), it had a population density of 191.3/km^{2} (495.4/sq mi) in 2016.

== See also ==
- List of communities in Saskatchewan
- List of villages in Saskatchewan
