= Bay Trail, Saskatchewan =

Community in Saskatchewan, Canada

Bay Trail
- Unincorporated community
- Location of Bay Trail in Saskatchewan Bay Trail (Canada)
- Coordinates: 52.117°N 105.157°W
- Country: Canada
- Province: Saskatchewan
- Region: Saskatchewan
- Census division: 11
- Rural Municipality (RM): Wolverine
- Elevation: 552 m (1,811 ft)
- Time zone: CST
- Postal code: S0K 0L0
- Area code: 306
- Highways: Highway 20

Bay Trail was an unincorporated community located at NE Sec.24, Twp.36, R.23, W2 from 1931 to 1974 on Highway 20 about 10 kilometres (6 mi) south of Humboldt and 6 kilometres (4 mi) north of Burr. At its zenith, it had a general store and post office; a Canadian Pacific Railway (CPR) station and housing for repair workers; and Deer Lake School. Nearby were a few farmsteads.

Bay Trail shared a Roman Catholic church, St. Scholastica, with Burr.

== History ==
The name "Bay Trail" was a shortened version of the nearby Carlton Trail which ran between Winnipeg, Manitoba and the Hudson's Bay Company trading post at Fort Carlton in the 1800s. In the late 1870s a telegraph line was strung alongside the trail from Winnipeg to Edmonton. About 1.6 kilometres (1 mi) west of Bay Trail, the Carlton Trail and telegraph line crossed Wolverine Creek. On a farm about 1.6 kilometres (1 mi) west is a site marker for a telegraph station. With the construction of the transcontinental railroad in the mid-1880s, both the trail and telegraph line were abandoned, but not before they had played a significant part during the North-West Rebellion of 1885.

Bay Trail was established at the start of the Great Depression in Canada by first generation Canadian Paul V. Hiebert (known as P.V. to distinguish him from his same-named 1904 pioneer father, Paul Senior). He built his first general store in 1931, a very modest affair with the store at the front and a small living area at the back. P.V. located the Bay Trail store directly west across the highway completed in 1928 and the CPR railway station. The CPR had just built and completed their line between Lanigan and Prince Albert on September 16, 1930. (The original name of the CPR station was Mancroft.)

Between the one-roomed school and general store was a railway station, a "section house" for the railway repair crew supervisor, and a "shack" for his section hand—all the makings of an emerging rural village of the times. The only feature missing from a typical Canadian prairie settlement was the ionic wooden grain elevator. Over the years, local farmers tried to have one built by the Saskatchewan Wheat Pool but they were never successful.

The Bay Trail district was part of St. Peter's Colony, a Benedictine Abbey established in 1903 which encouraged Roman Catholic settlers, mainly of German heritage. Besides the Hiebert family, some other 1904-05 pioneer families who homesteaded in the Bay Trail district were Novecosky, Saretsky, Suchan, Loroff, Grunsky, Poelzer and Schedlosky — German-speaking families that emigrated from southern Russia.

== Zenith of Bay Trail ==
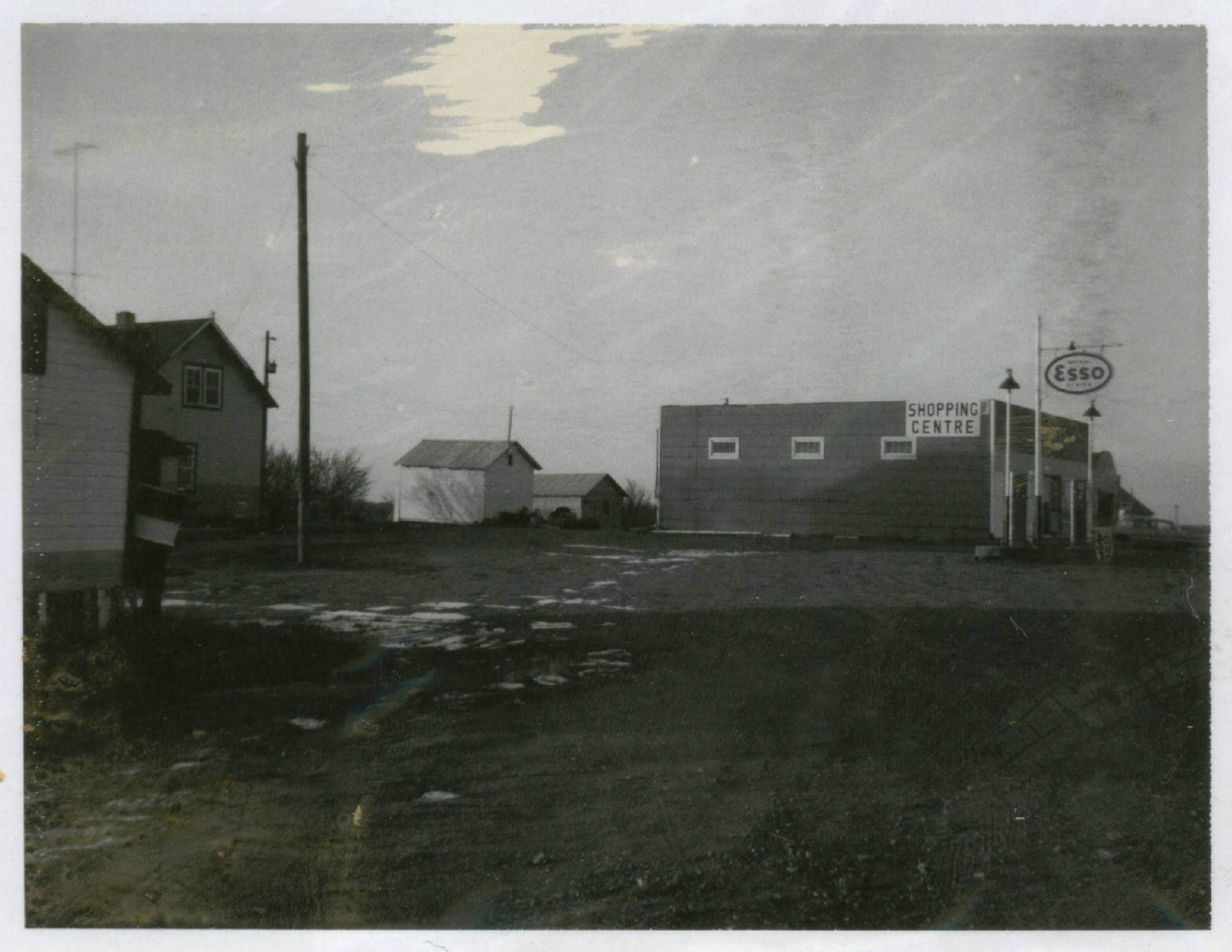
Bay Trail general store 1960

The picture shows the Bay Trail store complex at its zenith about 1960, just after the Saskatchewan rural electrification program. From left to right: A bit of the "oil shed" (note a 45-gallon (200 L) gasoline drum teetering a bit on the platform), the Hiebert house with a tall TV aerial, the telephone pole in the foreground and the power pole with the transformer in the background, the white "flour shed" for large bags of flour, sugar and other non-perishables, another storage shed (hiding the "outhouse" behind), the new store built in 1952, a bit of the rounded front of the original store repurposed as a garage, and the new electric gasoline pumps.

== Demise of Bay Trail ==
Deer Lake School was closed in 1965. Shortly after Highway 20 was reconstructed, straightened and paved to make it easier to "get to town"; the railway station was closed and the railway tracks removed. Grain elevators no longer needed to be placed every few miles for horse-drawn wagons. Not only that, farming changed dramatically with little room for the small, uneconomic farms and villages of the first Canadian-born generation. In 1974, P.V. and spouse Helen sold the store (later demolished) and became part of the rural exodus to the city. Of the 40-some nieces and nephews of Helen and P.V. less than a half dozen stayed in the area engaged in large scale agricultural activities.

== See also ==
- List of communities in Saskatchewan
