= Rural Municipality of Wolverine No. 340 =

Rural municipality in Saskatchewan, Canada

Wolverine No. 340 Plasterfield No. 340 (1909–1910)
- Rural municipality
- Rural Municipality of Wolverine No. 340
- Location of the RM of Wolverine No. 340 in Saskatchewan
- Coordinates: 52.013°N 105.210°W
- Country: Canada
- Province: Saskatchewan
- Census division: 11
- SARM division: 5
- Formed: December 13, 1909
- Name change: March 31, 1910 (from RM of Plasterfield No. 340)

Government
  - Reeve: Bryan Gibney
  - Governing body: RM of Wolverine No. 340 Council
  - Administrator: Sandi Dunne
  - Office location: Burr

Area (2016)
  - Land: 834.78 km^{2} (322.31 sq mi)

Population (2016)
  - Total: 480
  - Density: 0.6/km^{2} (1.6/sq mi)
- Time zone: CST
  - Summer (DST): CST
- Area codes: 306 and 639

The Rural Municipality of Wolverine No. 340 (2016 population: 480) is a rural municipality (RM) in the Canadian province of Saskatchewan within Census Division No. 11 and SARM Division No. 5. It is located in the central portion of the province east of Saskatoon.

== History ==
The RM of Plasterfield No. 340 was originally incorporated as a rural municipality on December 13, 1909. Its name was changed to the RM of Wolverine No. 340 on March 31, 1910. The RM's name is derived from Wolverine Lake, which lies near the centre of the RM.

== Geography ==
=== Communities and localities ===
The following unincorporated communities are within the RM.

Localities

- Attica
- Bay Trail
- Burr
- Wolverine

== Demographics ==
Population history (1981–2016)
Year	Pop.	±%
1981	848	—
1986	767	−9.6%
1991	641	−16.4%
1996	541	−15.6%
2001	526	−2.8%
2006	480	−8.7%
2011	464	−3.3%
2016	480	+3.4%
Source: Statistics Canada via Saskatchewan Bureau of Statistics

In the 2021 Census of Population conducted by Statistics Canada, the RM of Wolverine No. 340 had a population of 511 living in 195 of its 222 total private dwellings, a change of 6.5% from its 2016 population of 480. With a land area of 828.06 km^{2} (319.72 sq mi), it had a population density of 0.6/km^{2} (1.6/sq mi) in 2021.

In the 2016 Census of Population, the RM of Wolverine No. 340 recorded a population of 480 living in 177 of its 187 total private dwellings, a 3.4% change from its 2011 population of 464. With a land area of 834.78 km^{2} (322.31 sq mi), it had a population density of 0.6/km^{2} (1.5/sq mi) in 2016.

== Government ==
The RM of Wolverine No. 340 is governed by an elected municipal council and an appointed administrator. The reeve of the RM is Bryan Gibney while its administrator is Sandi Dunne. The RM's office is located in Burr.

== Transportation ==
Rail

- Minnedosa - Saskatoon - Edmonton C.P.R—serves Kandahar, Dafoe, Jansen, Esk, Lanigan, Guernsey, Wolverine, Plunkett, Viscount

Roads

- Highway 20—North south section from Burr to Lanigan
- Highway 667—serves Jansen, Saskatchewan and St. Gregor, Saskatchewan North South through RM

== See also ==
- List of rural municipalities in Saskatchewan
