= Crystal Springs, Saskatchewan =

Community in Saskatchewan, Canada

Coordinates: 52°48′25″N 105°21′50″W

Crystal Springs is a hamlet in east central Saskatchewan, Canada, located between Waitville and Tway. It was originally known as Bon Eau, which is French for "good water". When English settlers arrived they changed the name to Crystal Springs. This hamlet is about 48 kilometres (30 mi) south-east of Prince Albert.

Crystal Springs is situated on the banks of the Carrot River and lies at the intersection of Highway 20 and Highway 778.

== Demographics ==
In the 2021 Census of Population conducted by Statistics Canada, Crystal Springs had a population of 20 living in 11 of its 15 total private dwellings, a change of 33.3% from its 2016 population of 15. With a land area of 0.3 km^{2} (0.12 sq mi), it had a population density of 66.7/km^{2} (172.7/sq mi) in 2021.

== See also ==
- List of communities in Saskatchewan
