= Domremy, Saskatchewan =

Community in Saskatchewan, Canada

Domremy
- Special service area
- Special Service Area of Domremy
- Location within Saskatchewan Location within Canada
- Coordinates: 52°47′00″N 105°44′00″W
- Country: Canada
- Province: Saskatchewan
- Rural municipality: St. Louis No. 431
- Post office founded (NWT): 1896-05-01

Area
  - Total: 0.75 km^{2} (0.29 sq mi)

Population (2006)
  - Total: 124
  - Density: 166.3/km^{2} (431/sq mi)
  - Summer (DST): CST

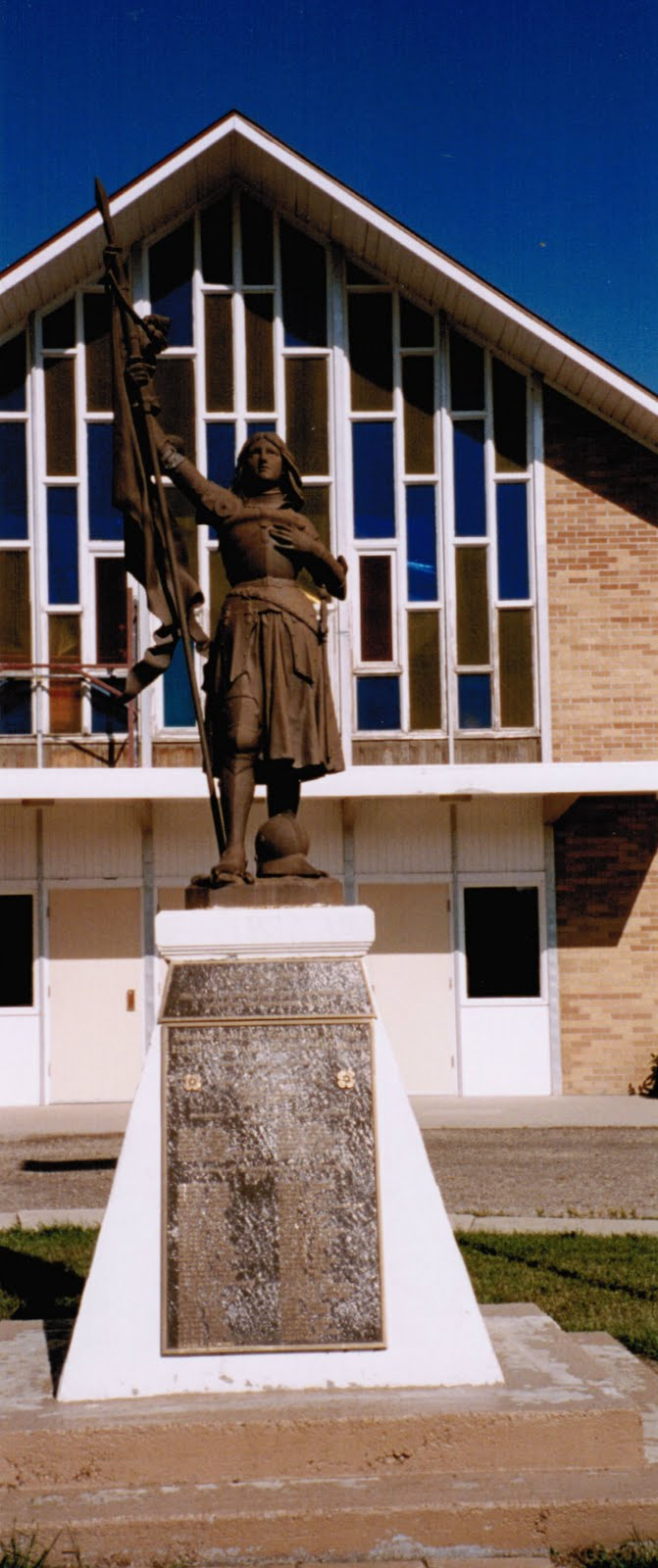
St. Jeanne d'Arc Roman Catholic Church in Domremy

Domremy (/ˈdɔːrəmi/ DOR-ə-mee) is a special service area in the Rural Municipality of St. Louis No. 431, in the Canadian province of Saskatchewan. It held village status prior to December 31, 2006. The population was 124 people in 2006. Domremy is located on Highway 320 near Highway 2 and Highway 225 in central Saskatchewan. Domremy had a post office established as early as May 1, 1896 in the District of Saskatchewan, NWT.

Domremy is named after the French village of Domrémy, which was the birthplace of Joan of Arc.

== Demographics ==
In the 2021 Census of Population conducted by Statistics Canada, Domremy had a population of 113 living in 47 of its 69 total private dwellings, a change of 11.9% from its 2016 population of 101. With a land area of 0.66 km^{2} (0.25 sq mi), it had a population density of 171.2/km^{2} (443.4/sq mi) in 2021.

Canada census – Domremy, Saskatchewan community profile

	2011
Population	125 (+.08% from 2006)
Land area	0.75 km^{2} (0.29 sq mi)
Population density	167.7/km^{2} (434/sq mi)
Median age	40.2 (M: 42.5, F: 35.5)
Private dwellings	67 (total)
Median household income

References: 2011

== Notable residents ==
- Stan Hovdebo (1979–1993)

== See also ==
- List of communities in Saskatchewan
- List of hamlets in Saskatchewan
