= Rural Municipality of St. Louis No. 431 =

Rural municipality in Saskatchewan, Canada

St. Louis No. 431
- Rural municipality
- Rural Municipality of St. Louis No. 431

- Location of the RM of St. Louis No. 431 in Saskatchewan
- Coordinates: 52.809°N 105.996°W
- Country: Canada
- Province: Saskatchewan
- Census division: 15
- SARM division: 5
- Formed: January 1, 1913

Government
  - Reeve: Emile Boutin
  - Governing body: RM of St. Louis No. 431 Council
  - Administrator: Sindy Tait
  - Office location: Hoey

Area (2016)
  - Land: 790.93 km^{2} (305.38 sq mi)

Population (2016)
  - Total: 1,086
  - Density: 1.4/km^{2} (3.6/sq mi)
- Time zone: CST
  - Summer (DST): CST
- Area codes: 306 and 639

The Rural Municipality of St. Louis No. 431 (2016 population: 1,086) is a rural municipality (RM) in the Canadian province of Saskatchewan within Census Division No. 15 and SARM Division No. 5.

== History ==
The RM of St. Louis No. 431 incorporated as a rural municipality on January 1, 1913.

== Geography ==
=== Communities and localities ===
The following urban municipalities are surrounded by the RM.

Villages

- Batoche
- Domremy
- St. Louis
- St. Laurent de Grandin

The following unincorporated communities are within the RM.

Organized hamlets

- Hoey
- St. Isidore de Bellevue

== Demographics ==
Population history (1981–2016)
Year	Pop.	±%
1981	1,426	—
1986	1,393	−2.3%
1991	1,307	−6.2%
1996	1,227	−6.1%
2001	1,154	−5.9%
2006	1,006	−12.8%
2011	969	−3.7%
2016	1,086	+12.1%
Source: Statistics Canada via Saskatchewan Bureau of Statistics

In the 2021 Census of Population conducted by Statistics Canada, the RM of St. Louis No. 431 had a population of 1,029 living in 402 of its 472 total private dwellings, a change of −5.2% from its 2016 population of 1,086. With a land area of 777.51 km^{2} (300.20 sq mi), it had a population density of 1.3/km^{2} (3.4/sq mi) in 2021.

In the 2016 Census of Population, the RM of St. Louis No. 431 recorded a population of 1,086 living in 424 of its 452 total private dwellings, a 12.1% change from its 2011 population of 969. With a land area of 790.93 km^{2} (305.38 sq mi), it had a population density of 1.4/km^{2} (3.6/sq mi) in 2016.

== Government ==
The RM of St. Louis No. 431 is governed by an elected municipal council and an appointed administrator that meets on the first Wednesday of every month. The reeve of the RM is Emile Boutin while its administrator is Sindy Tait. The RM's office is located in Hoey.

== See also ==
- List of rural municipalities in Saskatchewan
