= Rural Municipality of Invergordon No. 430 =

Rural municipality in Saskatchewan, Canada

Invergordon No. 430
- Rural municipality
- Rural Municipality of Invergordon No. 430
- Location of the RM of Invergordon No. 430 in Saskatchewan
- Coordinates: 52.811°N 105.245°W
- Country: Canada
- Province: Saskatchewan
- Census division: 15
- SARM division: 5
- Formed: December 11, 1911

Government
  - Reeve: Kevin Hawreschuk
  - Governing body: RM of Invergordon No. 430 Council
  - Administrator: Courtney Beaulieu
  - Office location: Crystal Springs

Area (2016)
  - Land: 854.19 km^{2} (329.80 sq mi)

Population (2016)
  - Total: 565
  - Density: 0.7/km^{2} (1.8/sq mi)
- Time zone: CST
  - Summer (DST): CST
- Area codes: 306 and 639

The Rural Municipality of Invergordon No. 430 (2016 population: 565) is a rural municipality (RM) in the Canadian province of Saskatchewan within Census Division No. 15 and SARM Division No. 5. It is located west of the city of Melfort.

== History ==
The RM of Invergordon No. 430 incorporated as a rural municipality on December 11, 1911.

== Geography ==
=== Communities and localities ===
The following urban municipalities are surrounded by the RM.

Organized hamlets

- Crystal Springs
- Meskanaw
- Tway

Special service areas

- Yellow Creek

Localities

- Tarnopol
- Tiger Hills
- Waitville

== Demographics ==
Population history (1981–2016)
Year	Pop.	±%
1981	991	—
1986	899	−9.3%
1991	811	−9.8%
1996	724	−10.7%
2001	664	−8.3%
2006	570	−14.2%
2011	651	+14.2%
2016	565	−13.2%
Source: Statistics Canada via Saskatchewan Bureau of Statistics

In the 2021 Census of Population conducted by Statistics Canada, the RM of Invergordon No. 430 had a population of 563 living in 266 of its 385 total private dwellings, a change of −0.4% from its 2016 population of 565. With a land area of 844.71 km^{2} (326.14 sq mi), it had a population density of 0.7/km^{2} (1.7/sq mi) in 2021.

In the 2016 Census of Population, the RM of Invergordon No. 430 recorded a population of 565 living in 272 of its 395 total private dwellings, a −13.2% change from its 2011 population of 651. With a land area of 854.19 km^{2} (329.80 sq mi), it had a population density of 0.7/km^{2} (1.7/sq mi) in 2016.

== Government ==
The RM of Invergordon No. 430 is governed by an elected municipal council and an appointed administrator that meets on the second Wednesday of every month. The reeve of the RM is Bruce Hunter while its administrator is Courtney Beaulieu. The RM's office is located in Crystal Springs.

== Transportation ==
- Highway 41—serves Meskanaw
- Highway 20—intersects Highway 41
- Highway 320—intersects Highway 20
