= Guernsey, Saskatchewan =

Community in Saskatchewan, Canada

Guernsey
- Organized hamlet
- Location of Guernsey in Saskatchewan Guernsey (Canada)
- Coordinates: 51°52′17″N 105°11′15″W
- Country: Canada
- Province: Saskatchewan
- Region: Saskatchewan
- Census division: 11
- Rural municipality (RM): Usborne No. 310
- Dissolved: December 31, 2005

Government
  - Governing body: RM of Usborne No. 318

Area (2021)
  - Land: 0.66 km^{2} (0.25 sq mi)

Population (2021)
  - Total: 95
  - Density: 143.9/km^{2} (373/sq mi)
- Time zone: UTC−05:00 (CST)
- Area code: 306
- Highways: 16, 668

Guernsey is an organized hamlet within the Rural Municipality of Usborne No. 310 in the Canadian province of Saskatchewan. It previously held village status until it was dissolved in 2005.

== History ==
Prior to December 31, 2005, Guernsey was incorporated as a village, and dissolved becoming under the jurisdiction of the Rural Municipality of Usborne No. 310.

== Demographics ==
In the 2021 Canadian census conducted by Statistics Canada, Guernsey had a population of 95 living in 40 of its 51 total private dwellings, a change of −2.1% from its 2016 population of 97. With a land area of 0.66 km^{2} (0.25 sq mi), it had a population density of 143.9/km^{2} (372.8/sq mi) in 2021.

== Climate ==
Climate data for Guernsey Climate ID: 4013038; coordinates 51°47′N 105°17′W; elevation: 526.1 m (1,726 ft); 1971–2000 normals
Month	Jan	Feb	Mar	Apr	May	Jun	Jul	Aug	Sep	Oct	Nov	Dec	Year
Record high °C (°F)	7.0 (44.6)	8.0 (46.4)	15.0 (59.0)	30.0 (86.0)	37.8 (100.0)	40.0 (104.0)	37.5 (99.5)	36.5 (97.7)	33.0 (91.4)	29.5 (85.1)	21.1 (70.0)	8.5 (47.3)	40.0 (104.0)
Mean daily maximum °C (°F)	−11.0 (12.2)	−8.0 (17.6)	−1.5 (29.3)	10.7 (51.3)	18.5 (65.3)	22.8 (73.0)	25.3 (77.5)	24.0 (75.2)	17.4 (63.3)	10.5 (50.9)	−1.7 (28.9)	−9.5 (14.9)	8.1 (46.6)
Daily mean °C (°F)	−16.5 (2.3)	−13.3 (8.1)	−6.7 (19.9)	4.3 (39.7)	11.6 (52.9)	16.0 (60.8)	18.5 (65.3)	16.9 (62.4)	10.9 (51.6)	4.3 (39.7)	−6.4 (20.5)	−14.4 (6.1)	2.1 (35.8)
Mean daily minimum °C (°F)	−21.9 (−7.4)	−18.5 (−1.3)	−11.9 (10.6)	−2.1 (28.2)	4.6 (40.3)	9.1 (48.4)	11.6 (52.9)	9.7 (49.5)	4.3 (39.7)	−1.9 (28.6)	−11.0 (12.2)	−19.3 (−2.7)	−3.9 (25.0)
Record low °C (°F)	−42.8 (−45.0)	−42.0 (−43.6)	−36.1 (−33.0)	−28.3 (−18.9)	−8.0 (17.6)	−1.5 (29.3)	4.0 (39.2)	−2.5 (27.5)	−7.5 (18.5)	−22.5 (−8.5)	−35.5 (−31.9)	−43.0 (−45.4)	−43.0 (−45.4)
Average precipitation mm (inches)	14.9 (0.59)	12.4 (0.49)	18.1 (0.71)	20.4 (0.80)	49.0 (1.93)	62.8 (2.47)	66.8 (2.63)	47.8 (1.88)	41.2 (1.62)	19.3 (0.76)	13.2 (0.52)	16.5 (0.65)	382.1 (15.04)
Average rainfall mm (inches)	0.3 (0.01)	0.1 (0.00)	2.0 (0.08)	15.0 (0.59)	48.1 (1.89)	62.8 (2.47)	66.8 (2.63)	47.8 (1.88)	39.5 (1.56)	12.7 (0.50)	3.4 (0.13)	1.4 (0.06)	299.7 (11.80)
Average snowfall cm (inches)	14.6 (5.7)	12.3 (4.8)	16.1 (6.3)	5.4 (2.1)	0.9 (0.4)	0.0 (0.0)	0.0 (0.0)	0.0 (0.0)	1.7 (0.7)	6.6 (2.6)	9.8 (3.9)	15.2 (6.0)	82.5 (32.5)
Average precipitation days (≥ 0.2 mm)	0.4	3.9	5.4	5.7	9.1	10.4	10.1	9.3	8.8	6.3	5.2	5.8	85.2
Average rainy days (≥ 0.2 mm)	0.21	0.05	1.1	4.1	8.7	10.4	10.1	9.3	8.6	4.9	1.3	0.68	59.3
Average snowy days (≥ 0.2 cm)	5.2	3.8	4.7	1.8	0.42	0.0	0.0	0.0	0.45	1.7	4.2	5.5	27.7
Source: Environment and Climate Change Canada

== See also ==
- List of communities in Saskatchewan
