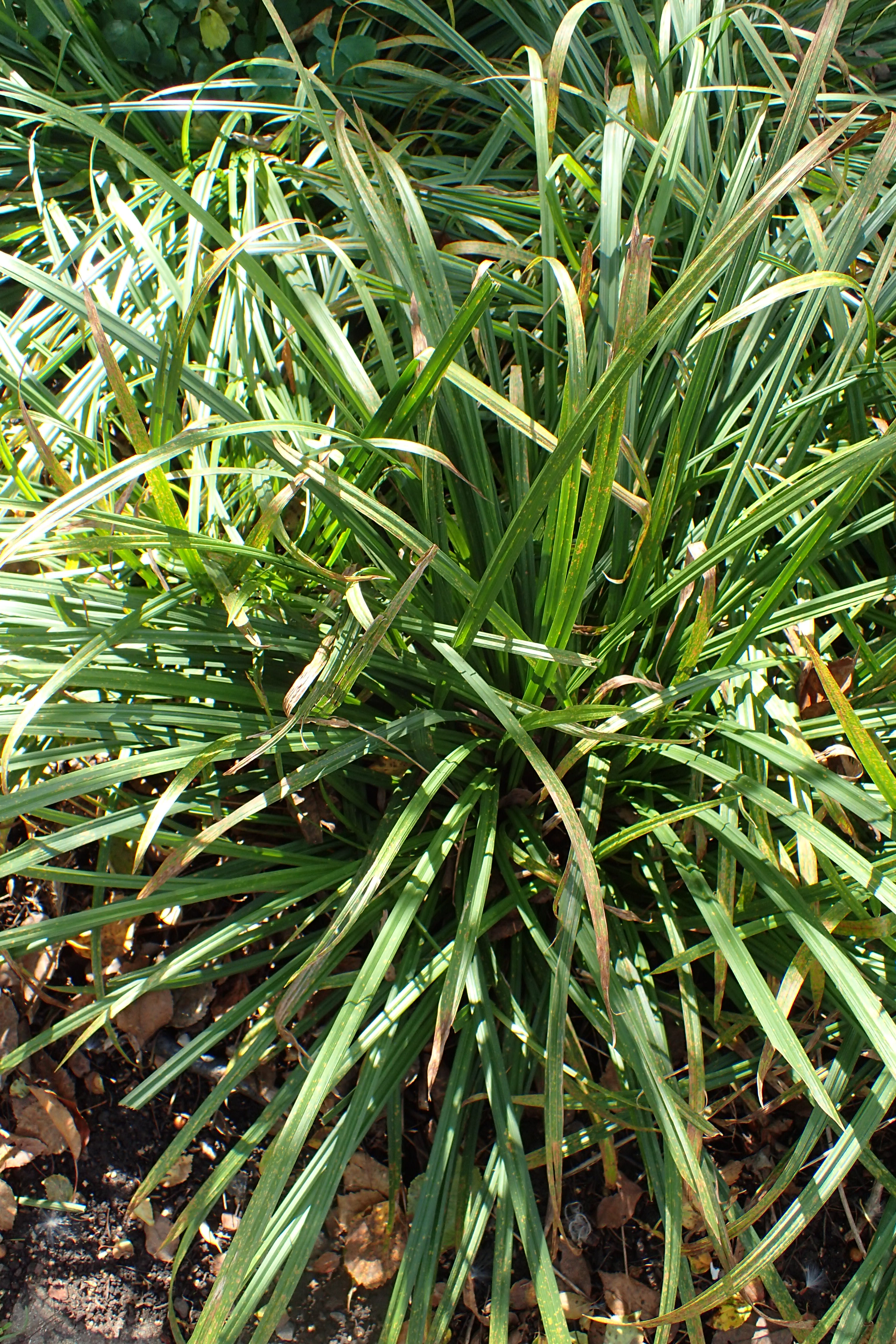
- Habit

Scientific classification
- Kingdom: Plantae
- Clade: Tracheophytes
- Clade: Angiosperms
- Clade: Monocots
- Clade: Commelinids
- Order: Poales
- Family: Cyperaceae
- Genus: Carex
- Species: C. gracillima

Binomial name
- Carex gracillima Schwein.

Synonyms
- List: Carex digitalis Schwein. & Torr.; Carex gracillima var. macerrima Fernald & Wiegand; Loxanisa gracillima (Schwein.) Raf.

= Carex gracillima =

Species of grass-like plant

Carex gracillima, called the graceful sedge or purple-sheathed graceful sedge, is a species of flowering plant in the genus Carex, native to central and eastern Canada and the central and eastern United States. It prefers to grow in shady, wet woodlands and similar habitats.
