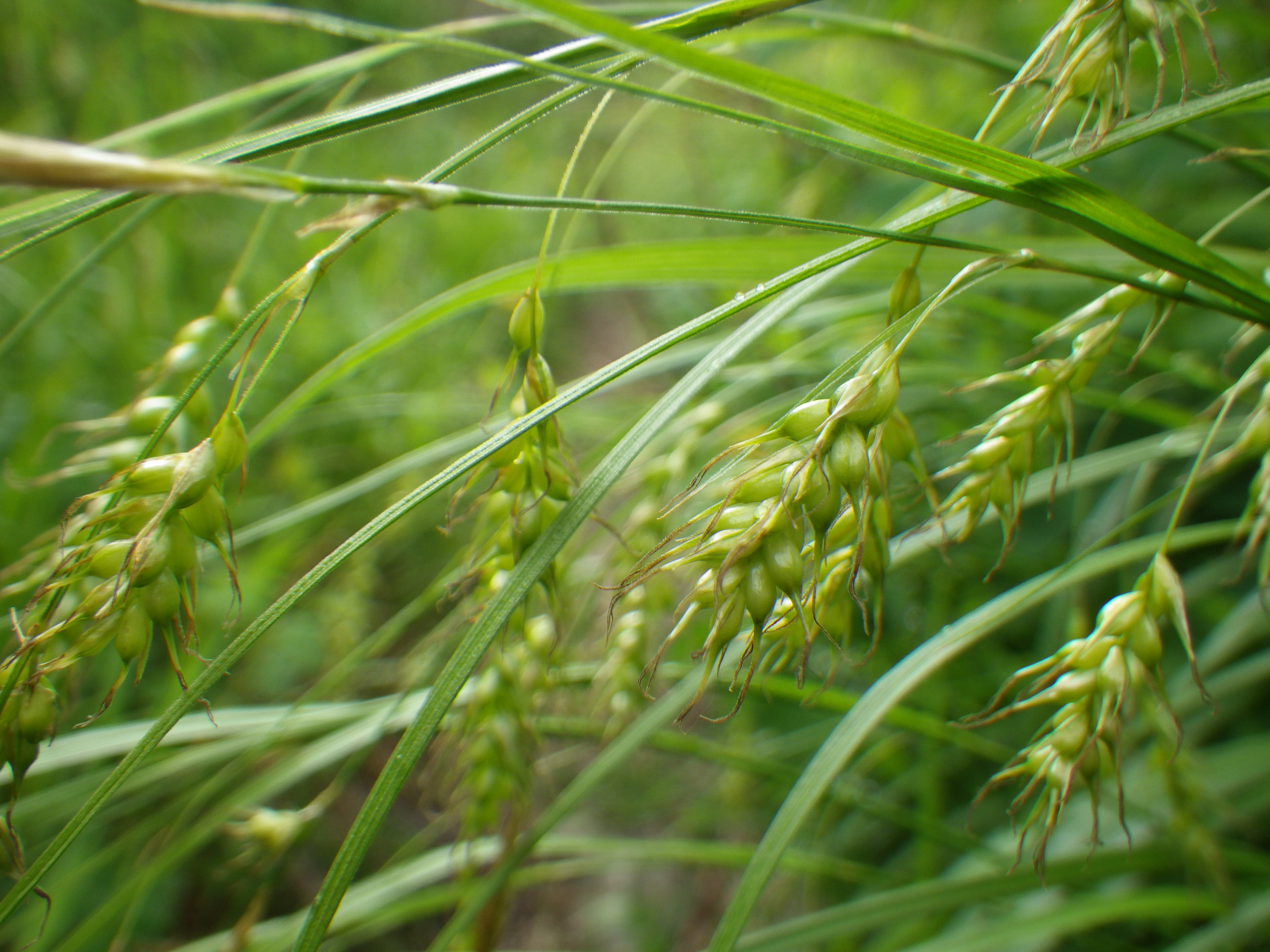
- Hanging spikes of seeds nearing maturity

Conservation status
- Secure (NatureServe)

Scientific classification
- Kingdom: Plantae
- Clade: Tracheophytes
- Clade: Angiosperms
- Clade: Monocots
- Clade: Commelinids
- Order: Poales
- Family: Cyperaceae
- Genus: Carex
- Subgenus: Carex subg. Carex
- Section: Carex sect. Hymenochlaenae
- Species: C. sprengelii

Binomial name
- Carex sprengelii Dewey ex Spreng.

= Carex sprengelii =

Species of grass-like plant

Carex sprengelii, known as Sprengel's sedge and long-beaked sedge, is a sedge with hanging seed heads, native to North America.

== Description ==
Long-beaked sedge has flowering stems (culms) 30 to 90 cm (1 to 3 ft) long. The leaves are 2.5 to 4 mm (0.10 to 0.16 in) wide and shorter than the flowering stems.

Each flowering stem has 1 to 4 spikes of flowers. While flowering, they are crowded at the tip of the stem. The terminal spike is either all male or male with a few female flowers at the bottom. Each female spike has 10 to 40 female flowers, each about 1 mm (0.04 in) apart. Each spike is on its stalk (pedicel), and each succeeding spike is shorter than the previous one. As the female flowers develop into seeds (achenes), the stalk droops or nods downwards. The bract enclosing the seed has a long tapered tip (beak), which gives the plant its common name.
