= Rural Municipality of Usborne No. 310 =

Rural municipality in Saskatchewan, Canada

Usborne No. 310
- Rural municipality
- Rural Municipality of Usborne No. 310
- Location of the RM of Usborne No. 310 in Saskatchewan
- Coordinates: 51.762°N 105.148°W
- Country: Canada
- Province: Saskatchewan
- Census division: 11
- SARM division: 5
- Formed: December 13, 1909

Government
  - Reeve: Jack Gibney
  - Governing body: RM of Usborne No. 310 Council
  - Acting Administrator: Lanette Morrow
  - Office location: Guernsey

Area (2016)
  - Land: 810.38 km^{2} (312.89 sq mi)

Population (2016)
  - Total: 529
  - Density: 0.7/km^{2} (1.8/sq mi)
- Time zone: CST
  - Summer (DST): CST
- Area codes: 306 and 639

The Rural Municipality of Usborne No. 310 (2016 population: 529) is a rural municipality (RM) in the Canadian province of Saskatchewan within Census Division No. 11 and SARM Division No. 5. It is located in the central portion of the province.

== History ==
The RM of Usborne No. 310 incorporated as a rural municipality on December 13, 1909.

== Geography ==
=== Communities and localities ===
The following urban municipalities are surrounded by the RM.

Towns

- Lanigan

Villages

- Drake

The following unincorporated communities are within the RM.

Organized hamlets

- Guernsey (dissolved as a village, December 31, 2005)

Localities

- Lockwood (dissolved as a village, January 1, 2002)

== Demographics ==
Population history (1981–2016)
Year	Pop.	±%
1981	628	—
1986	620	−1.3%
1991	618	−0.3%
1996	598	−3.2%
2001	534	−10.7%
2006	566	+6.0%
2011	547	−3.4%
2016	529	−3.3%
Source: Statistics Canada via Saskatchewan Bureau of Statistics

In the 2021 Census of Population conducted by Statistics Canada, the RM of Usborne No. 310 had a population of 511 living in 205 of its 236 total private dwellings, a change of −3.4% from its 2016 population of 529. With a land area of 806.11 km^{2} (311.24 sq mi), it had a population density of 0.6/km^{2} (1.6/sq mi) in 2021.

In the 2016 Census of Population, the RM of Usborne No. 310 recorded a population of 529 living in 201 of its 216 total private dwellings, a −3.3% change from its 2011 population of 547. With a land area of 810.38 km^{2} (312.89 sq mi), it had a population density of 0.7/km^{2} (1.7/sq mi) in 2016.

== Attractions ==
- Lanigan & District Heritage Centre

== Government ==
The RM of Usborne No. 310 is governed by an elected municipal council and an appointed administrator that meets on the second Wednesday of every month. The reeve of the RM is Jack Gibney while its administrator is Lannette Morrow. The RM's office is located in Guernsey.

== See also ==
- List of rural municipalities in Saskatchewan
