= Basin Lake (Saskatchewan) =

Lake in Saskatchewan, Canada

- Location in Saskatchewan Basin Lake (Canada)
- Location: RM of Three Lakes No. 400, Saskatchewan
- Coordinates: 52.6334°N 105.2839°W
- Type: Salt lake
- Part of: Saskatchewan River drainage basin
- Primary outflows: None
- Basin countries: Canada
- Surface area: 3,782.5 ha (9,347 acres)
- Average depth: 9 m (30 ft)
- Max. depth: 16.5 m (54 ft)
- Shore length^{1}: 42 km (26 mi)
- Surface elevation: 509 m (1,670 ft)
- Settlements: None
- ^{1} Shore length is not a well-defined measure.

Basin Lake is an endorheic salt lake in the Canadian province of Saskatchewan. The lake is in the RM of Three Lakes No. 400 in the Boreal Transition ecoregion and is within an Important Bird Area (IBA) of Canada and part of the Basin and Middle Lakes Bird Sanctuary. There are no communities along the lake's shore and the closest highway is Highway 20. At 40 kilometres (25 mi) to the south, Humbolt is the closest city.

== Description ==
Basin Lake is a salt lake within the Carrot River watershed. It has no overland outflow and water levels are dependent upon spring run-off, intermittent creeks, the water table, and rainfall. As a result, water levels fluctuate greatly and extensive mudflats form near the lake's shoreline. Basin Lake is the end point in the terminal Lenore Lake basin, with lakes such as Lenore Lake, Frog Lake, and Middle Lake upstream. The lake is surrounded by farms and groves of aspen, willow, and white spruce. Until the 1970s, the lake supported a population of whitefish but as the lake's salinity increased, the population could not be supported.

The lake was formed in the 1890s after significant summer rains in 1896 soften the ground allowing a spring to rise up from an aquifer in the nearby hills. Prior to the flooding, the area was a depression with a "mixture of bushes, sloughs and hay meadows." Eventually the lake's water level rose to match the aquifer's. The aquifer has a natural underground spring that flows into the Carrot River Valley.

== Basin and Middle Lakes Migratory Bird Sanctuary ==
Basin Lake, and neighbouring Middle Lake, are part of the Basin and Middle Lakes Migratory Bird Sanctuary (MBS) and Basin and Middle Lakes (075) Important Bird Area (IBA) of Canada. The MBS was established on 9 March 1925 and "is a major resting and feeding area for migratory waterfowl and swans." The lakes, at about 1.5 km (0.93 mi) apart, were designated an IBA in 2001. The eastern part of Basin Lake and parts of Middle Lake are designated critical piping plover habitat and is provincially protected under the Wildlife Habitat Protection Act. While Basin Lake averages about 9 m (30 ft) deep, Middle lake averages only about 1 m (3 ft 3 in) deep. Directly to the south-east is another migratory bird sanctuary at Lenore Lake.

Basin and Middle Lakes provide important habitats to several bird species, including the American white pelican, double-crested cormorant, pied-billed grebe, horned grebe, eared grebe, western grebe, red-necked grebe, California gull, black tern, common tern, and the black-crowned night heron.

== See also ==
- List of lakes of Saskatchewan
- List of Migratory Bird Sanctuaries of Canada
- List of protected areas of Saskatchewan
