= Duval, Saskatchewan =

Village in Saskatchewan, Canada

Duval
- Village
- Village of Duval
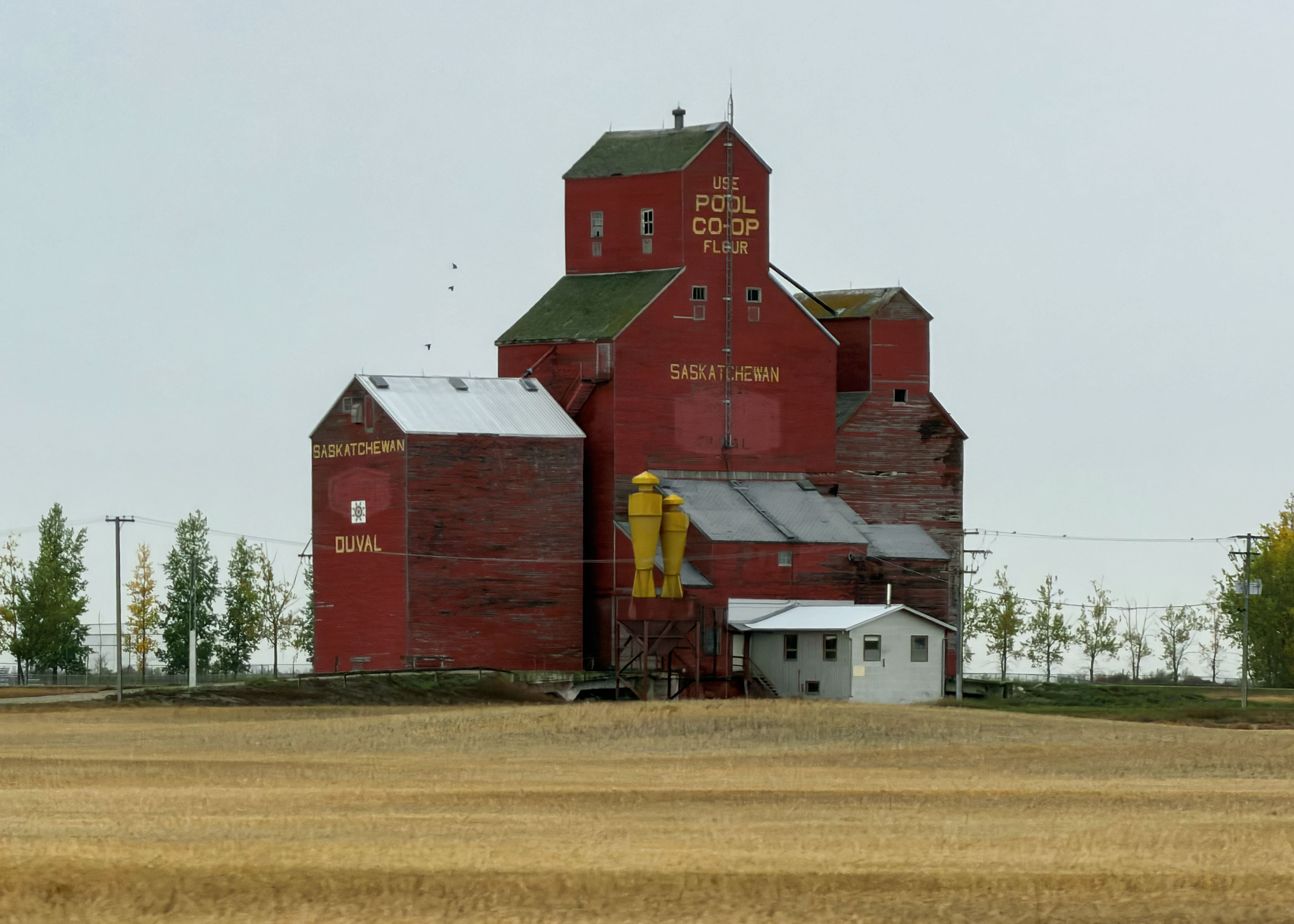
- Former Saskatchewan Wheat Pool grain elevator in Duval

- Location of Duval in Saskatchewan Duval (Canada)
- Coordinates: 51.162°N 104.982°W
- Country: Canada
- Province: Saskatchewan
- Region: Central
- Census division: 11
- Rural Municipality: Last Mountain Valley No. 250

Government
  - Type: Municipal
  - Governing body: Duval Village Council
  - Mayor: Darren Bender
  - Administrator: Jeff Jones

Area
  - Total: 0.75 km^{2} (0.29 sq mi)

Population (2016)
  - Total: 83
  - Density: 110.1/km^{2} (285/sq mi)
- Time zone: UTC-6 (CST)
- Postal code: S0G 1G0
- Area code: 306
- Highways: Highway 20
- Railways: Canadian Pacific Railway

Duval (2016 population: 83) is a village in the Canadian province of Saskatchewan within the Rural Municipality of Last Mountain Valley No. 250 and Census Division No. 11. The village is located on Highway 20, approximately 93 kilometres (58 mi) north of the city of Regina.

== History ==
Duval incorporated as a village on 21 December 1910.

== Demographics ==
Population history (1981–2016)
Year	Pop.	±%
1981	129	—
1986	120	−7.0%
1991	108	−10.0%
1996	98	−9.3%
2001	103	+5.1%
2006	94	−8.7%
2011	97	+3.2%
2016	83	−14.4%
Source: Statistics Canada via Saskatchewan Bureau of Statistics

In the 2021 Census of Population conducted by Statistics Canada, Duval had a population of 95 living in 49 of its 55 total private dwellings, a change of 14.5% from its 2016 population of 83. With a land area of 0.67 km^{2} (0.26 sq mi), it had a population density of 141.8/km^{2} (367.2/sq mi) in 2021.

In the 2016 Census of Population, the Village of Duval recorded a population of 83 living in 44 of its 46 total private dwellings, a −16.9% change from its 2011 population of 97. With a land area of 0.75 km^{2} (0.29 sq mi), it had a population density of 110.7/km^{2} (286.6/sq mi) in 2016.

== Climate ==
Climate data for Duval
Month	Jan	Feb	Mar	Apr	May	Jun	Jul	Aug	Sep	Oct	Nov	Dec	Year
Record high °C (°F)	10.5 (50.9)	9 (48)	20 (68)	31.5 (88.7)	37.5 (99.5)	39 (102)	38 (100)	37.8 (100.0)	36.1 (97.0)	29 (84)	21.7 (71.1)	12 (54)	39 (102)
Mean daily maximum °C (°F)	−11 (12)	−7.2 (19.0)	−0.5 (31.1)	10.1 (50.2)	18.1 (64.6)	22.2 (72.0)	24.6 (76.3)	24.3 (75.7)	17.7 (63.9)	10.5 (50.9)	−1.1 (30.0)	−8.3 (17.1)	8.3 (46.9)
Daily mean °C (°F)	−15.7 (3.7)	−11.6 (11.1)	−4.9 (23.2)	4.6 (40.3)	11.9 (53.4)	16.4 (61.5)	18.6 (65.5)	18 (64)	11.9 (53.4)	5.2 (41.4)	−5.1 (22.8)	−12.8 (9.0)	3 (37)
Mean daily minimum °C (°F)	−20.4 (−4.7)	−16 (3)	−9.3 (15.3)	−1 (30)	5.8 (42.4)	10.5 (50.9)	12.7 (54.9)	11.6 (52.9)	6.1 (43.0)	0 (32)	−9.1 (15.6)	−17.3 (0.9)	−2.2 (28.0)
Record low °C (°F)	−41.7 (−43.1)	−42 (−44)	−35.6 (−32.1)	−23.3 (−9.9)	−9.4 (15.1)	−1.7 (28.9)	3.5 (38.3)	−0.6 (30.9)	−8.3 (17.1)	−20.6 (−5.1)	−32 (−26)	−41.5 (−42.7)	−42 (−44)
Average precipitation mm (inches)	16 (0.6)	11.1 (0.44)	17.4 (0.69)	26 (1.0)	47.5 (1.87)	75.2 (2.96)	69.7 (2.74)	46.8 (1.84)	33 (1.3)	21.3 (0.84)	14.8 (0.58)	18.6 (0.73)	397.4 (15.65)
Source: Environment Canada

== See also ==
- List of communities in Saskatchewan
- List of villages in Saskatchewan
