= Rural Municipality of Three Lakes No. 400 =

Rural municipality in Saskatchewan, Canada

Three Lakes No. 400
- Rural municipality
- Rural Municipality of Three Lakes No. 400
- Location of the RM of Three Lakes No. 400 in Saskatchewan
- Coordinates: 52.520°N 105.27°W
- Country: Canada
- Province: Saskatchewan
- Census division: 15
- SARM division: 5
- Formed: January 1, 1913

Government
  - Reeve: Allen Baumann
  - Governing body: RM of Three Lakes No. 400 Council
  - Administrator: Tim Schmidt
  - Office location: Middle Lake

Area (2016)
  - Land: 772.49 km^{2} (298.26 sq mi)

Population (2016)
  - Total: 598
  - Density: 0.8/km^{2} (2.1/sq mi)
- Time zone: CST
  - Summer (DST): CST
- Area codes: 306 and 639

The Rural Municipality of Three Lakes No. 400 (2016 population: 598) is a rural municipality (RM) in the Canadian province of Saskatchewan within Census Division No. 15 and SARM Division No. 5.

== History ==
The RM of Three Lakes No. 400 incorporated as a rural municipality on January 1, 1913.

== Geography ==
=== Communities and localities ===
The following urban municipalities are surrounded by the RM.

Villages

- Middle Lake
- Pilger
- St. Benedict

The following urban communities are within the RM.

Localities

- Reynaud
- Verndale

== Demographics ==
Population history (1981–2016)
Year	Pop.	±%
1981	992	—
1986	858	−13.5%
1991	736	−14.2%
1996	682	−7.3%
2001	713	+4.5%
2006	659	−7.6%
2011	620	−5.9%
2016	598	−3.5%
Source: Statistics Canada via Saskatchewan Bureau of Statistics

In the 2021 Census of Population conducted by Statistics Canada, the RM of Three Lakes No. 400 had a population of 725 living in 228 of its 376 total private dwellings, a change of 21.2% from its 2016 population of 598. With a land area of 770.76 km^{2} (297.59 sq mi), it had a population density of 0.9/km^{2} (2.4/sq mi) in 2021.

In the 2016 Census of Population, the RM of Three Lakes No. 400 recorded a population of 598 living in 213 of its 340 total private dwellings, a −3.5% change from its 2011 population of 620. With a land area of 772.49 km^{2} (298.26 sq mi), it had a population density of 0.8/km^{2} (2.0/sq mi) in 2016.

== Attractions ==
- Basin and Middle Lakes Migratory Bird Sanctuary
- Lucien Lake Regional Park

== Government ==
The RM of Three Lakes No. 400 is governed by an elected municipal council and an appointed administrator that meets on the second Wednesday of every month. The reeve of the RM is Allen Baumann while its administrator is Tim Schmidt. The RM's office is located in Middle Lake.

== Transportation ==
- Saskatchewan Highway 20
- Saskatchewan Highway 773
- Saskatchewan Highway 777

== See also ==
- List of rural municipalities in Saskatchewan
