= Burr, Saskatchewan =

Community in Saskatchewan, Canada

Burr
- Unincorporated community
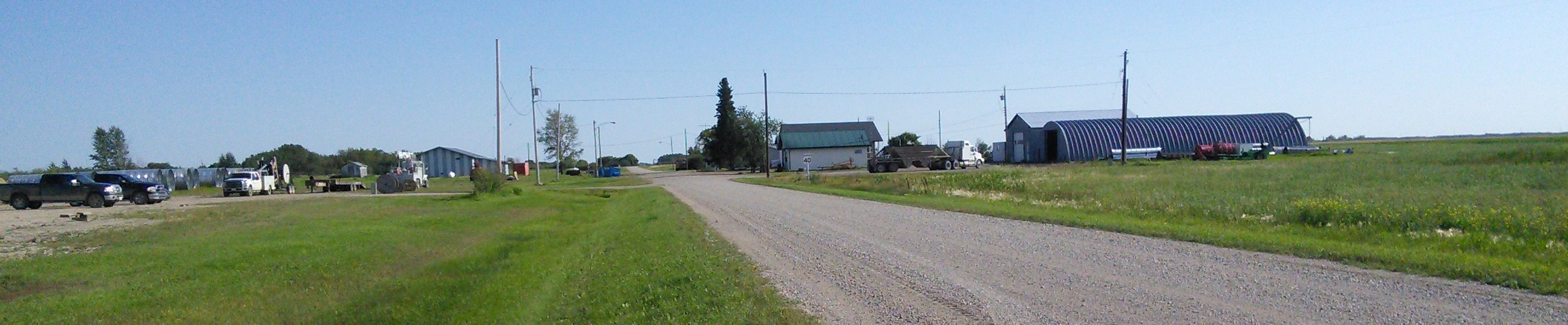
- Burr in August 2014

- Location of Burr in Saskatchewan
- Coordinates: 52.042°N 105.135°W
- Country: Canada
- Province: Saskatchewan
- Region: Saskatchewan
- Census division: 11
- Rural Municipality: Wolverine
- Elevation: 557.78 m (1,830.0 ft)
- Time zone: CST
- Postal code: S0K 0T0
- Area code: 306
- Highways: Highway 20

Burr is an unincorporated community south of Humboldt, Saskatchewan.

It has an office for the Rural Municipality of Wolverine No. 340, a post office. The town also has the Burr Recreational Hall right in town limits (across from the 2 remaining houses) and ball diamonds at the south end of the town. A short distance north is Saint Scholastica Roman Catholic Church (founded 1905).

According to the Encyclopedia of Saskatchewan, Victoria Cross recipient Raphael Louis Zengel lived in Burr from 1906 to 1914.

The "Burr Project" is a plan to extract potash from a large deposit in the area.

== See also ==
- List of communities in Saskatchewan
