= Govan, Saskatchewan =

Town in Saskatchewan, Canada

Govan
- Town
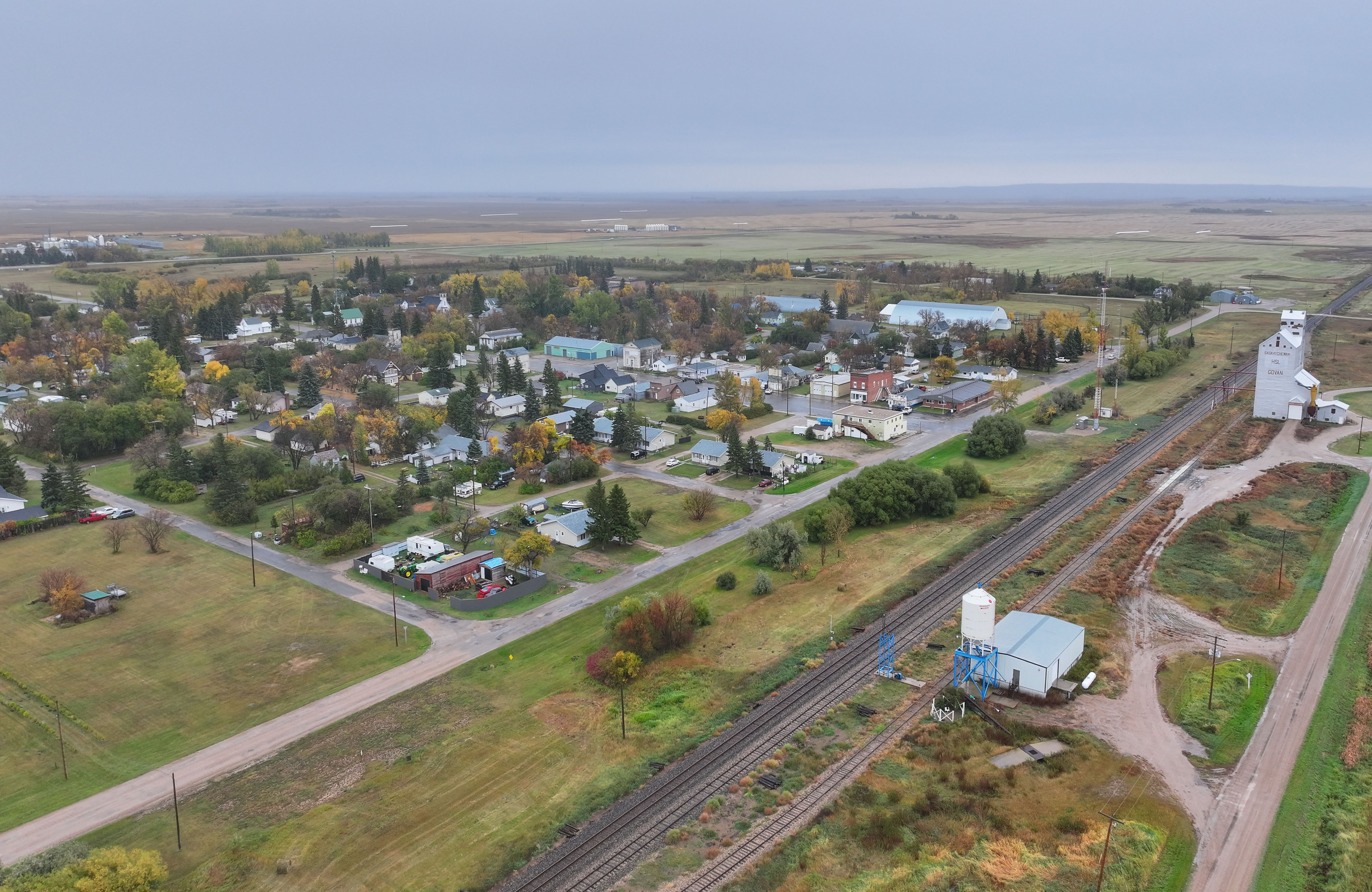

- Location of Govan in Saskatchewan Govan (Canada)
- Coordinates: 51.311°N 104.995°W
- Country: Canada
- Province: Saskatchewan
- Census division: No. 11
- Rural Municipality: Last Mountain Valley
- Post office Founded: 1906-06-01

Government
  - Mayor: Wesley Pearce
  - Administrator: Kelly Holbrook
  - Governing body: Govan Town Council

Area
  - Total: 1.35 km^{2} (0.52 sq mi)

Population (2021)
  - Total: 200
  - Density: 159.7/km^{2} (414/sq mi)
- Time zone: UTC-6 (CST)
- Postal code: S0G 1Z0
- Area code: 306
- Highways: Highway 20
- Website: Official website

Govan /ˈɡɒvən/ is a town in the Canadian province of Saskatchewan about 111 kilometres (69 mi) north of Regina on Highway 20. In 2011, the town had 216 residents.

== History ==
The first settlers made their homes along the shores of Long Lake (now known as Last Mountain Lake), at places close to McKillops's Landing, Arlington Beach, and Taylorboro. The original settlers used the waters of Last Mountain Lake, which is 93 kilometres (58 mi) long, as a means of transportation. Supplies for the farmers were brought north up the lake and grain was taken down the lake in boats, then stored in elevators at the east end. This lake transportation system was abandoned when the early extension of the Canadian Pacific Railway Kirkella branch from Bulyea to Lanigan and on to Saskatoon was built, opening up more of the country to the settlers.

Some of the settlers came north from Craven, through Bulyea and Strasbourg districts. Others came up the waters on Long Lake.

== Demographics ==
In the 2021 Census of Population conducted by Statistics Canada, Govan had a population of 200 living in 102 of its 122 total private dwellings, a change of 3.1% from its 2016 population of 194. With a land area of 1.27 km^{2} (0.49 sq mi), it had a population density of 157.5/km^{2} (407.9/sq mi) in 2021.

== Sports ==
A men's senior ice hockey team from Govan was one of five founding teams in 1965 of the Highway Hockey League in central Saskatchewan.

== See also ==
- List of communities in Saskatchewan
- List of towns in Saskatchewan
