= Tway, Saskatchewan =

Community in Saskatchewan, Canada

Coordinates: 52°44′20″N 105°26′20″W

Tway is a hamlet in the Rural Municipality of Invergordon No. 430 in the Canadian province of Saskatchewan. The Tway National Wildlife Area is north-east of the community.

== Demographics ==
In the 2021 Census of Population conducted by Statistics Canada, Tway had a population of 5 living in 7 of its 11 total private dwellings, a change of 0% from its 2016 population of 5. With a land area of 0.2 km^{2} (0.077 sq mi), it had a population density of 25.0/km^{2} (64.7/sq mi) in 2021.

== See also ==
- List of communities in Saskatchewan
