= Saskatchewan Highway 42 =

Provincial highway in Saskatchewan, Canada

Highway 42
- Highway 42 highlighted in red
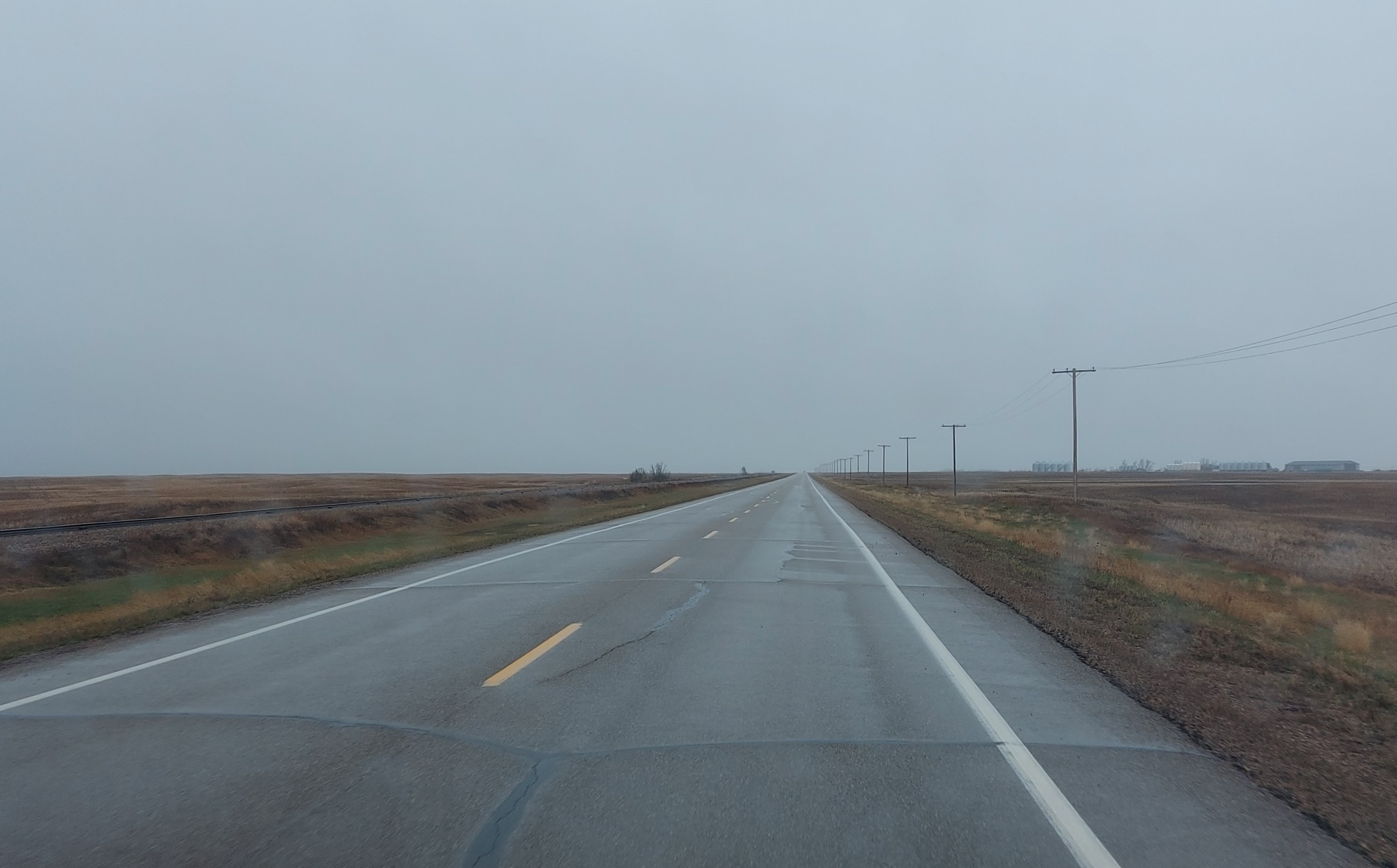
- Highway 42 near Marquis

Route information
- Maintained by Ministry of Highways and Infrastructure
- Length: 205.0 km (127.4 mi)

Major junctions
- East end: Highway 2 in Tuxford
- Highway 19 near Central Butte; Highway 45 in Lucky Lake; Highway 44 in Dinsmore
- West end: Highway 15 near Milden

Location
- Country: Canada
- Province: Saskatchewan
- Rural municipalities: Marquis, Eyebrow, Enfield, Maple Bush, Canaan, Victory, King George, Milden

Highway system
- Provincial highways in Saskatchewan
← Highway 41	→ Highway 43

Highway 42 is a provincial highway in the Canadian province of Saskatchewan. It runs from the intersection of Highway 2 in Tuxford in a north-west direction to Highway 15 near Milden. Even though the section between Lucky Lake and Milden is predominantly north–south, the entirety of Hwy 42 is signed east–west. The highway is about 205 kilometres (127 mi) long.

Highway 42 passes by the communities of Marquis, Keeler, Brownlee, Eyebrow, Central Butte, Lawson, Riverhurst, Lucky Lake, and Dinsmore, Saskatchewan. It crosses Lake Diefenbaker on the 1.5-kilometre (0.93 mi) long Riverhurst Ferry route. That crossing is an ice road in the winter.

== Route description ==
Hwy 42 begins in the Rural Municipality of Marquis No. 191 on the north side of Tuxford, at an intersection with Hwy 2 (Veterans Memorial Highway), near that highway's intersection with Hwy 202. It heads west on the north side of town, having an intersection with Railway Avenue, before leaving Tuxford and curving northwest, running parallel with a railway as it travels through both Marquis and Keeler, where it has an intersection and short concurrency (overlap) with Hwy 643, before crossing into the Rural Municipality of Eyebrow No. 193 at village of Brownlee. The highway travels along Pacific Avenue through the south side of town, where it has an intersection with Lake Valley Road (Range Road 3011, provides access to the hamlet of Lake Valley), before leaving Brownlee heading through farmland for several kilometres to the village of Eyebrow, where it has intersections with Range Road 3020 (provides access to the remains of Eskbank), Hwy 367, and crosses the railway as it passes through town along Prairie Avenue. Leaving Eyebrow, Hwy 42 curve due westward as it travels through rural areas for several kilometres, crossing Hwy 627 and Range Road 3035 (provides access to Mawer) before becoming concurrent with Hwy 19 and immediately entering the Rural Municipality of Enfield No. 194.

The pair travel to the northern side of the town of Central Butte, where they pass by Central Butte Airport and Hwy 19 splits off and heads south into town while Hwy 42 curves northwest, leaving Central Butte and paralleling a now abandoned rail line as it soon enters the Rural Municipality of Maple Bush No. 224 to pass through Lawson and have intersections with Township Road 224 (provides access to Tugaske) and Gilroy Road (Range Road 3062, provides access to Gilroy). After traveling through the village of Riverhurst, the highway has an intersection with Hwy 644 before crossing Lake Diefenbaker (South Saskatchewan River) via the Riverhurst Ferry, and entering the Rural Municipality of Canaan No. 225. After having a junction with Hwy 737 near Greenbrier, the road makes sudden sharp curve to the left at the junction with Hwy 373 on its way to the village of Lucky Lake, where it travels along the southern side of town as it has an intersection with Hwy 45 (Railway Avenue), crosses a railway, and has an extremely short concurrency with Hwy 646. Now entering the Rural Municipality of Victory No. 226, Hwy 42 meets Hwy 342 north of Beechy before making a sharp sudden curve to the north immediately afterward, entering the Rural Municipality of King George No. 256.

Hwy 42 heads north through rural areas of the Coteau Hills region for the next several kilometres, where it has a junction with Hwy 751, to enter the Rural Municipality of Milden No. 286 via a switchback. Entering the village of Dinsmore at an intersection with Hwy 44, the pair travel together along the south side of town, where they cross a railway line, before Hwy 42 splits off and turns back northward through rural farmland for several kilometres, crossing a causeway over the very western portion of Milden Lake before coming to an end just a few kilometres east of the village of Milden at an intersection with Hwy 15. The entire length of Hwy 42 is a paved, two-lane highway.

== Major intersections ==
From east to west:

Rural municipality	Location	km	mi	Destinations	Notes
Marquis No. 191	Tuxford	0.0	0.0	Highway 2 – Chamberlain, Prince Albert, Moose Jaw	
Marquis No. 191		23.0	14.3	Highway 643 north – Craik	East end of Highway 643 concurrency
Marquis No. 191	Keeler	24.9	15.5	Highway 643 south – Caron	West end of Highway 643 concurrency
Eyebrow No. 193	Brownlee	36.9	22.9	Lake Valley Road (Range Road 3011) – Lake Valley	
Eyebrow No. 193	Eyebrow	47.6	29.6	Range Road 3020 – Eskbank	
Eyebrow No. 193	Eyebrow	49.1	30.5	Highway 367 west – Bridgeford	
Eyebrow No. 193		57.4	35.7	Highway 627 – Parkbeg, Tugaske	
Eyebrow No. 193		65.6	40.8	Range Road 3035 – Mawer	
↑ / ↓		67.1	41.7	Highway 19 north – Elbow	East end of Highway 19 concurrency
Enfield No. 194	Central Butte	73.6	45.7	Highway 19 south – Chaplin	West end of Highway 19 concurrency
Maple Bush No. 224		91.9	57.1	Township Road 224 – Tugaske	
Maple Bush No. 224		93.1	57.8	Gilroy Road (Range Road 3062) – Gilroy	
Maple Bush No. 224		104.6	65.0	Highway 644 south – Morse	West of Riverhurst
Lake Diefenbaker		105.6– 107.7	65.6– 66.9	Riverhurst Ferry	
Canaan No. 225		111.1	69.0	Highway 737 west – Demaine, Beechy	
Canaan No. 225		115.9	72.0	Highway 373 north – Birsay	
Canaan No. 225	Lucky Lake	126.8	78.8	Highway 45 north – Birsay, Outlook	
Canaan No. 225	Lucky Lake	126.9	78.9	Highway 646 north	East end of Highway 646 concurrency
Canaan No. 225	Lucky Lake	127.2	79.0	Highway 646 south	West end of Highway 646 concurrency
Victory No. 226		145.1	90.2	Highway 342 south – Beechy	
King George No. 256		166.0	103.1	Highway 751 west – Elrose	
Milden No. 286	Dinsmore	185.7	115.4	Highway 44 east – Macrorie, Gardiner Dam	East end of Highway 44 concurrency
Milden No. 286		188.8	117.3	Highway 44 west – Elrose	West end of Highway 44 concurrency
Milden No. 286		205.0	127.4	Highway 15 – Rosetown, Outlook	East of Milden
1.000 mi = 1.609 km; 1.000 km = 0.621 mi: Concurrency terminus

== See also ==
- Transportation in Saskatchewan
- Roads in Saskatchewan
