= Saskatchewan Highway 373 =

Provincial highway in Saskatchewan, Canada

Highway 373

Route information
- Maintained by Ministry of Highways and Infrastructure
- Length: 14.0 km (8.7 mi)

Major junctions
- South end: Highway 42 near Lucky Lake
- North end: Highway 45 near Birsay

Location
- Country: Canada
- Province: Saskatchewan
- Rural municipalities: Canaan, Coteau

Highway system
- Provincial highways in Saskatchewan
← Highway 371	→ Highway 374

Highway 373 is a provincial highway in the Canadian province of Saskatchewan. It runs from Highway 42 near Lucky Lake to Highway 45 in Birsay. It is about 14 kilometres (8.7 mi) long.

== Route description ==
Hwy 373 begins in the Rural Municipality of Canaan No. 225 at an intersection with Hwy 42 roughly halfway between the village of Lucky Lake and the Riverhurst Ferry. It heads north as a paved, two-lane highway for a couple kilometres to an intersection with Township Road 235, where the asphalt transitions to gravel at the site of the former Whitby School. Continuing north through rural farmland for several kilometres, the highway crosses a small creek and enters the Rural Municipality of Coteau No. 255, continuing on for a few more kilometres to enter the hamlet of Birsay, regaining asphalt and crossing Hwy 646 / Township Road 250, which provides access to Hitchcock Bay. After forming the main thoroughfare through the centre of town, Hwy 373 crosses Big Sky Rail's Conquest subdivision before coming to an end at an intersection with Hwy 45.

== Major intersections ==
From south to north:

Rural municipality	Location	km	mi	Destinations	Notes
Canaan No. 225		0.0	0.0	Highway 42 – Riverhurst, Lucky Lake, Riverhurst Ferry	Southern terminus
Canaan No. 225		1.8	1.1	Township Road 235	Southern end of unpaved section; site of former Whitby Schoolhouse
Coteau No. 255	Birsay	12.8	8.0	Northern end of unpaved section	
Coteau No. 255	Birsay	13.2	8.2	Highway 646 west / Township Road 250 east – Lucky Lake, Hitchcock Bay	Eastern terminus of Hwy 646
Coteau No. 255	Birsay	14.0	8.7	Highway 45 – Lucky Lake, Macrorie	Northern terminus
1.000 mi = 1.609 km; 1.000 km = 0.621 mi

== See also ==
- Transportation in Saskatchewan
- Roads in Saskatchewan
