= Division No. 7, Saskatchewan =

Census division in Canada

Coordinates: 50°23′24″N 105°32′24″W

Division No. 7
- Census division in Saskatchewan
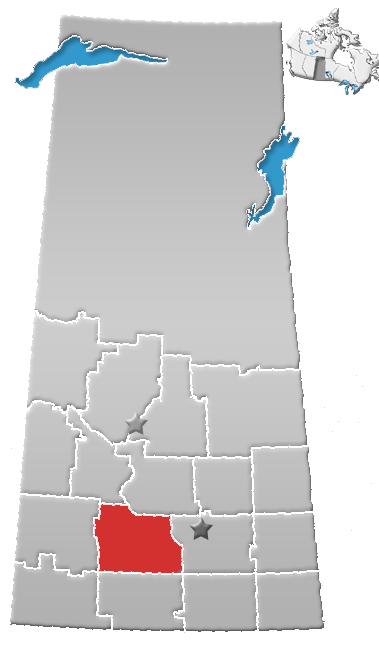
- Country: Canada
- Province: Saskatchewan

Area
  - Total: 18,836.58 km^{2} (7,272.84 sq mi)
- As of 2016

Population (2016)
  - Total: 47,195
  - Density: 2.5055/km^{2} (6.4892/sq mi)

Division No. 7 is one of eighteen census divisions in the province of Saskatchewan, Canada, as defined by Statistics Canada. It is located in the south-central part of the province. The most populous community in this division is Moose Jaw.

== Demographics ==
In the 2021 Census of Population conducted by Statistics Canada, Division No. 7 had a population of 47,413 living in 20,082 of its 23,339 total private dwellings, a change of 0.5% from its 2016 population of 47,195. With a land area of 18,707.37 km^{2} (7,222.96 sq mi), it had a population density of 2.5/km^{2} (6.6/sq mi) in 2021.

Knowledge of languages in Division No. 7 (1991−2021)
Language	2021		2011		2001		1991	
Language	Pop.	%	Pop.	%	Pop.	%	Pop.	%
English	45,415	99.56%	45,460	99.62%	45,780	99.91%	49,510	99.58%
French	2,215	4.86%	2,225	4.88%	2,560	5.59%	2,595	5.22%
Tagalog	880	1.93%	305	0.67%	40	0.09%	20	0.04%
German (Note: Combined responses of the High German languages, including Standard German, Pennsylvania German, Swiss German, and Yiddish.)	550	1.21%	1,090	2.39%	1,885	4.11%	2,675	5.38%
Chinese (Note: Combined responses of the Chinese languages, including Mandarin, Cantonese, Min Nan, Hakka, Wu (Shanghainese), Min Dong, Chinese, n.o.s., and Chinese languages, n.i.e..)	455	1%	245	0.54%	235	0.51%	310	0.62%
Spanish	425	0.93%	260	0.57%	130	0.28%	100	0.2%
Hindustani (Note: Combined responses of Hindi and Urdu as they form mutually intelligible registers of the Hindustani language.)	380	0.83%	135	0.3%	80	0.17%	15	0.03%
Arabic	170	0.37%	0	0%	70	0.15%	0	0%
Ukrainian	155	0.34%	205	0.45%	400	0.87%	645	1.3%
Punjabi	145	0.32%	15	0.03%	10	0.02%	0	0%
Dutch	85	0.19%	75	0.16%	105	0.23%	190	0.38%
Hungarian	85	0.19%	25	0.05%	30	0.07%	50	0.1%
Russian	80	0.18%	70	0.15%	80	0.17%	80	0.16%
Cree (Note: Combined responses of the Cree-Innu languages, previously categorized under "Cree" in past censuses.)	65	0.14%	25	0.05%	70	0.15%	35	0.07%
Polish	60	0.13%	45	0.1%	105	0.23%	175	0.35%
Italian	55	0.12%	30	0.07%	90	0.2%	150	0.3%
Greek	40	0.09%	20	0.04%	20	0.04%	55	0.11%
Portuguese	35	0.08%	0	0%	0	0%	0	0%
Vietnamese	30	0.07%	50	0.11%	40	0.09%	60	0.12%
Persian (Note: Combined responses of Iranian Persian, Dari, and Persian (Farsi), n.o.s., as they form mutually intelligible registers of the Persian language)	0	0%	0	0%	20	0.04%	0	0%
Total responses	45,615	96.21%	45,635	97.83%	45,820	97.53%	49,720	97.52%
Total population	47,413	100%	46,648	100%	46,982	100%	50,984	100%

== Census subdivisions ==
The following census subdivisions (municipalities or municipal equivalents) are located within Saskatchewan's Division No. 7.

=== Cities ===
- Moose Jaw

=== Towns ===
- Central Butte
- Craik
- Herbert
- Morse

=== Villages ===
- Aylesbury
- Beechy
- Brownlee
- Caronport
- Chaplin
- Coderre
- Ernfold
- Eyebrow
- Hodgeville
- Keeler
- Lucky Lake
- Marquis
- Mortlach
- Riverhurst
- Rush Lake
- Shamrock
- Tugaske
- Tuxford
- Waldeck

=== Resort villages ===
- Beaver Flat
- Coteau Beach
- Mistusinne
- South Lake
- Sun Valley

=== Rural municipalities ===
- RM No. 131 Baildon
- RM No. 132 Hillsborough
- RM No. 133 Rodgers
- RM No. 134 Shamrock
- RM No. 135 Lawtonia
- RM No. 136 Coulee
- RM No. 161 Moose Jaw
- RM No. 162 Caron
- RM No. 163 Wheatlands
- RM No. 164 Chaplin
- RM No. 165 Morse
- RM No. 166 Excelsior
- RM No. 191 Marquis
- RM No. 193 Eyebrow
- RM No. 194 Enfield
- RM No. 222 Craik
- RM No. 223 Huron
- RM No. 224 Maple Bush
- RM No. 225 Canaan
- RM No. 226 Victory
- RM No. 255 Coteau
- RM No. 256 King George

=== Other communities ===
Hamlets

- Birsay
- Bushell Park
- Caron
- Courval
- Crestwynd
- Demaine
- Dunblane
- Gouldtown
- Main Centre
- Neidpath
- Parkbeg
- Prairie View
- Riverhurst
- Rush Lake
- Shamrock
- Tugaske
- Tuxford

== See also ==
- List of census divisions of Saskatchewan
- List of communities in Saskatchewan
