= Rural Municipality of Victory No. 226 =

Rural municipality in Saskatchewan, Canada

Victory No. 226
- Rural municipality
- Rural Municipality of Victory No. 226

- Location of the RM of Victory No. 226 in Saskatchewan
- Coordinates: 50.723°N 107.495°W
- Country: Canada
- Province: Saskatchewan
- Census division: 7
- SARM division: 3
- Formed: December 8, 1919

Government
  - Reeve: Lee Galbraith
  - Governing body: RM of Victory No. 226 Council
  - Administrator: Diane Watt
  - Office location: Beechy

Area (2016)
  - Land: 1,375.44 km^{2} (531.06 sq mi)

Population (2016)
  - Total: 380
  - Density: 0.3/km^{2} (0.78/sq mi)
- Time zone: CST
  - Summer (DST): CST
- Area codes: 306 and 639

The Rural Municipality of Victory No. 226 (2016 population: 380) is a rural municipality (RM) in the Canadian province of Saskatchewan within Census Division No. 7 and SARM Division No. 3.

== History ==
The RM of Victory No. 226 incorporated as a rural municipality on December 8, 1919. The first settlers to the area came in the early 1900s. The community of Demaine was established by the summer of 1908 by a band of settlers who hauled supplies from the Riverhurst area to the east, and across the South Saskatchewan River. Originally all supplies had to be moved from other areas as the settlements were being established.

As with current life in rural municipality the first settlers to the area were farmers who began to grow grain. They farmed with teams of oxen and mules prior to the invention of modern-day farming machinery. Eventually two larger settlements were established. These turned into the Village of Beechy and the Organized Hamlet of Demaine.

== Geography ==
Victory No. 226 is bordered by King George No. 256 in the north, Canaan No. 225 in the east, Lake Diefenbaker, which is part of the South Saskatchewan River in the south, and Lacadena No. 228 in the west. With wide open spaces and small rolling hills the land of Victory No. 226 comprises fertile soil perfect for grain farming. Naturally, much of the landscape is covered by grain farming operations.

The Matador Grasslands (50.6911°N 107.7324°W) are a protected area about 35 kilometres (22 mi) south-east of Kyle, near the South Saskatchewan River. The grasslands are situated on Crown land and are the "largest remaining uncultivated area of well drained lacustrine clay soils in the Northern Great Plains".

=== Communities and localities ===
The following urban municipalities are surrounded by the RM.

Villages

- Beechy

The following unincorporated communities are within the RM.

Organized hamlets

- Demaine

=== Climate ===
The rural municipality follows the typical climate and weather patterns of the southern half of Saskatchewan by having harsh, dry cold winters, and warm summers.

== Demographics ==
Population history (1981–2016)
Year	Pop.	±%
1981	575	—
1986	579	+0.7%
1991	573	−1.0%
1996	494	−13.8%
2001	474	−4.0%
2006	428	−9.7%
2011	443	+3.5%
2016	380	−14.2%
Source: Statistics Canada via Saskatchewan Bureau of Statistics

In the 2021 Census of Population conducted by Statistics Canada, the RM of Victory No. 226 had a population of 434 living in 143 of its 233 total private dwellings, a change of 14.2% from its 2016 population of 380. With a land area of 1,360.62 km^{2} (525.34 sq mi), it had a population density of 0.3/km^{2} (0.8/sq mi) in 2021.

In the 2016 Census of Population, the RM of Victory No. 226 recorded a population of 380 living in 121 of its 230 total private dwellings, a −14.2% change from its 2011 population of 443. With a land area of 1,375.44 km^{2} (531.06 sq mi), it had a population density of 0.3/km^{2} (0.7/sq mi) in 2016.

== Economy ==
Its economy is based on agriculture, primarily grain farming with livestock ranching as well.

== Government ==
The RM of Victory No. 226 is governed by an elected municipal council and an appointed administrator that meets on the first Thursday following the first Saturday of every month. The reeve of the RM is Mathew Hanke while the administrator is Diane Watt. The RM's office is located in Beechy.

== Prairie Lake Regional Park ==
Prairie Lake Regional Park (50.7125°N 107.3839°W) is a regional park in the RM of Victory about 21 kilometres (13 mi) south of Beechy. The park was founded in 1984 on Cruikshank Bay on the north shore of Lake Diefenbaker. There is a campground, marina, boat launch, playground, fish cleaning station, and a picnic area. The park has access to the lake for swimming, boating, fishing, and other water sports. The campground has electrified sites, washrooms / showers, and a sewer dump.

== Notable people ==
- Elwin Hermanson - politician
- Herbert Swan - former Speaker of the Legislative Assembly of Saskatchewan (1982–1986)
