= Mawer, Saskatchewan =

Coordinates: 50°45′N 106°24′W

Mawer is a locality in the Rural Municipality of Eyebrow No. 193, Saskatchewan, Canada. It previously held the status of village until December 31, 1967. The community is located about 5 km (3.1 mi) south of Highway 42 on Range Road 35, approximately 10 km (6.2 mi) southeast of Central Butte. It is located on the former Grand Trunk Pacific (now Canadian National Railways) rail line.

== See also ==
- List of communities in Saskatchewan
