= Rural Municipality of Canaan No. 225 =

Rural Municipality in Saskatchewan, Canada

Canaan No. 225
- Rural municipality
- Rural Municipality of Canaan No. 225

- Location of the RM of Canaan No. 225 in Saskatchewan
- Coordinates: 50.858°N 107.057°W
- Country: Canada
- Province: Saskatchewan
- Census division: 7
- SARM division: 3
- Formed: January 1, 1913

Government
  - Reeve: Lars Bjorgan
  - Governing body: RM of Canaan No. 225 Council
  - Administrator: Melanie Dyck
  - Office location: Lucky Lake

Area (2016)
  - Land: 549.09 km^{2} (212.00 sq mi)

Population (2016)
  - Total: 140
  - Density: 0.3/km^{2} (0.78/sq mi)
- Time zone: CST
  - Summer (DST): CST
- Area codes: 306 and 639

The Rural Municipality of Canaan No. 225 (2016 population: 140) is a rural municipality (RM) in the Canadian province of Saskatchewan within Census Division No. 7 and SARM Division No. 3.

== History ==
The RM of Canaan No. 225 incorporated as a rural municipality on January 1, 1913.

== Geography ==
=== Communities and localities ===
The following urban municipalities are surrounded by the RM.

Villages

- Lucky Lake

The following unincorporated communities are within the RM.

Localities

- Bernard
- Greenbrie

== Demographics ==
Population history (1981–2016)
Year	Pop.	±%
1981	292	—
1986	246	−15.8%
1991	204	−17.1%
1996	171	−16.2%
2001	191	+11.7%
2006	165	−13.6%
2011	149	−9.7%
2016	140	−6.0%
Source: Statistics Canada via Saskatchewan Bureau of Statistics

In the 2021 Census of Population conducted by Statistics Canada, the RM of Canaan No. 225 had a population of 145 living in 56 of its 61 total private dwellings, a change of 3.6% from its 2016 population of 140. With a land area of 549.95 km^{2} (212.34 sq mi), it had a population density of 0.3/km^{2} (0.7/sq mi) in 2021.

In the 2016 Census of Population, the RM of Canaan No. 225 recorded a population of 140 living in 56 of its 56 total private dwellings, a −6% change from its 2011 population of 149. With a land area of 549.09 km^{2} (212.00 sq mi), it had a population density of 0.3/km^{2} (0.7/sq mi) in 2016.

== Attractions ==
- Lucky Lake Heritage Museum
- Lucky Lake Heritage Marsh
- Palliser Regional Park
- Riverhurst Ferry

== Government ==
The RM of Canaan No. 225 is governed by an elected municipal council and an appointed administrator that meets on the second Thursday of every month. The reeve of the RM is Lars Bjorgan while its administrator is Melanie Dyck. The RM's office is located in Lucky Lake.

== Transportation ==
- Saskatchewan Highway 42
- Saskatchewan Highway 45
- Saskatchewan Highway 373
- Saskatchewan Highway 646
- Saskatchewan Highway 737
- Lucky Lake Airport
- Riverhurst Ferry

== See also ==
- List of rural municipalities in Saskatchewan
