= Lawson, Saskatchewan =

Community in Saskatchewan, Canada

Coordinates: 50.85003°N 106.65062°W

Lawson is a hamlet in Rural Municipality of Maple Bush No. 224, Saskatchewan, Canada. It previously held the status of village until December 31, 1985. The hamlet is located 12 kilometres (7.5 mi) north-west of the town of Central Butte on Highway 42 along the now defunct Canadian Pacific Railway subdivision.

== History ==
Prior to December 31, 1985, Lawson was incorporated as a village, and was restructured as a hamlet under the jurisdiction of the RM of Grass Lake No. 381 that date.

== Notable residents ==
- Arthur John Lewis, a politician

== See also ==
- List of communities in Saskatchewan
- List of hamlets in Saskatchewan
