= Luck Lake (Saskatchewan) =

Lake in Saskatchewan, Canada

- Location in Saskatchewan Luck Lake (Canada)
- Location: RM of Coteau No. 255, Saskatchewan
- Coordinates: 51.0679°N 107.0960°W
- Type: Endorheic lake
- Part of: Saskatchewan River drainage basin
- Primary outflows: None
- Basin countries: Canada
- Max. length: 8 km (5.0 mi)
- Max. width: 5 km (3.1 mi)
- Surface area: 2,823.5 ha (6,977 acres)
- Shore length^{1}: 26 km (16 mi)
- Surface elevation: 581 m (1,906 ft)
- Settlements: None
- ^{1} Shore length is not a well-defined measure.

Luck Lake is a shallow, marshy lake in the Canadian province of Saskatchewan. It is located in the Rural Municipality of Coteau No. 255 in the south-central part of the province. Luck Lake is a closed-basin lake that is fed by streams from the surrounding prairie and from Archer Ridge and Dougan Ridge to the north. The farmland around the lake is part of Irrigation District #16–Lake Diefenbaker Development Area. There are a total of 16 irrigators covering 5,258 hectares (12,992 acres). Water is drawn from Lake Diefenbaker for the irrigation and to control Luck Lake's water level.

There are no communities on the lake's shore. The village of Lucky Lake is 9.6 kilometres (6.0 mi) to the south and Birsay is 6.5 kilometres (4.0 mi) to the east. Access to Luck Lake is from Highway 45 and Highway 646.

== Luck Lake Heritage Marsh ==
Luck Lake and its surrounding shore and marsh are designated as Luck Lake (SK 003) Important Bird Area (IBA) of Canada and protected as Luck Lake Heritage Marsh. Originally Luck Lake was a large, shallow saline lake prone to fluctuations in water levels and, in some years, the lake would completely dry up. Beginning in 1987, a wetland enhancement project was undertaken that divided the lake into three basins separated by dykes that created 1,800 acres of freshwater marshes. The eastern and western basins always have water while the central basin is often flooded. Lake water levels are maintained by bringing water from Lake Diefenbaker as needed.

Prior to the enhancement project, during the years that Luck Lake had water in it, it was and important staging area for migrating birds. Since the enhancement project, it has "developed into a globally significant site for many water bird species" as the lake is no longer prone to drying up. Over 200 species of birds, 35 butterfly species, and numerous other animals can be found at the marsh. Some notable bird species include the tundra swan, greater white-fronted goose, snow goose, sandhill crane, Franklin's gull, Hudsonian godwit, and the marbled godwit.

The Luck Lake enhancement project was undertaken by Ducks Unlimited Canada in collaboration with the Saskatchewan Water Corporation, Saskatchewan Wildlife Federation, Wildlife Habitat Canada, and the Saskatchewan Natural History Society.

== See also ==
- List of lakes of Saskatchewan
- List of protected areas of Saskatchewan
