= Lake Valley =

Lake Valley may refer to:

- Lake Valley, California
- Lake Valley (Nevada), Lincoln and White Pine Counties, Nevada
- Lake Valley Township, Traverse County, Minnesota
- Lake Valley, San Juan County, New Mexico
- Lake Valley, Sierra County, New Mexico
- Lake Valley, Saskatchewan, Canada
