= Eyebrow, Saskatchewan =

Village in Saskatchewan, Canada

Eyebrow
- Village
- Village of Eyebrow
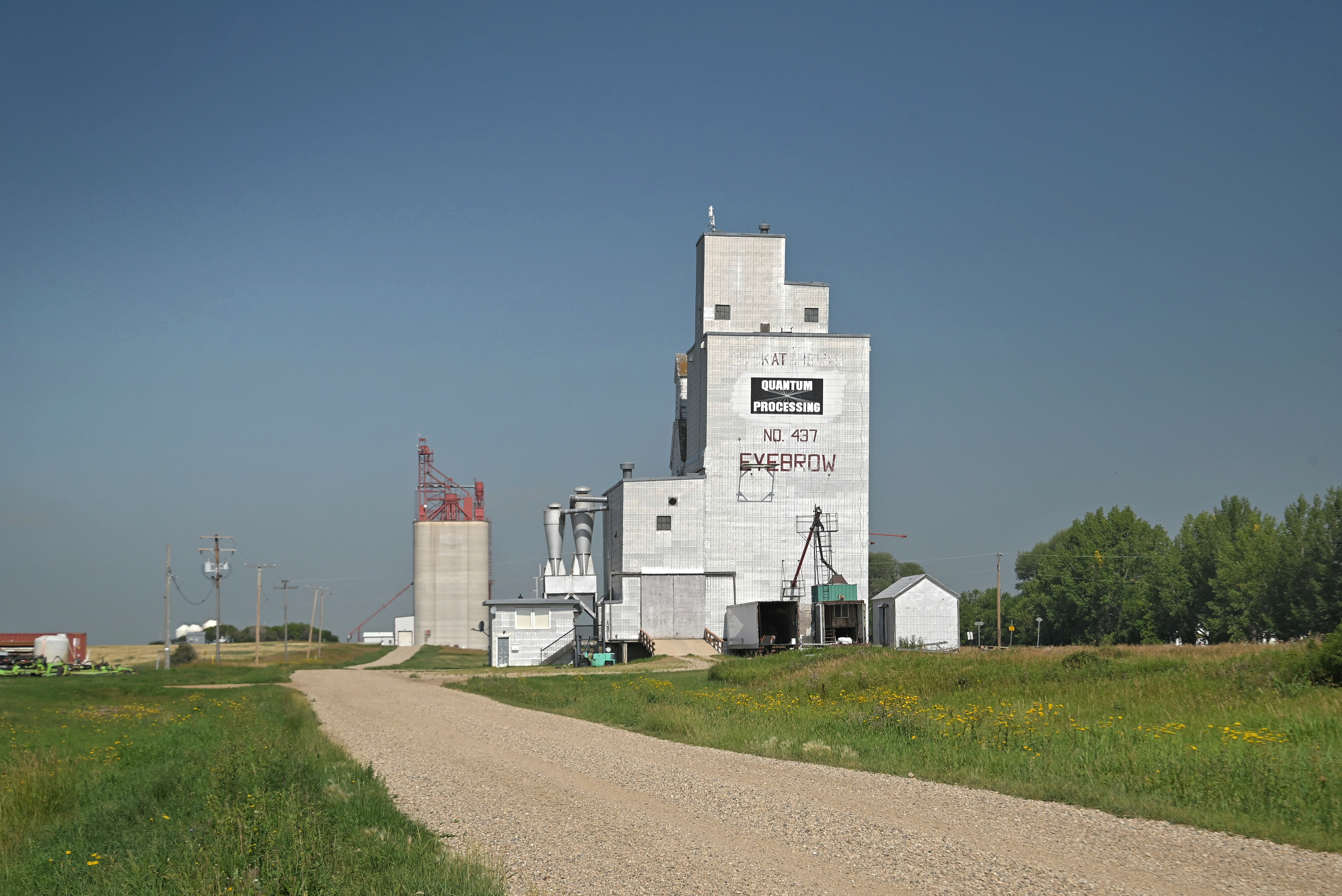
- Former Saskatchewan Wheat Pool grain elevator

- Location of Eyebrow in Saskatchewan Eyebrow (Canada)
- Coordinates: 50.732°N 106.185°W
- Country: Canada
- Province: Saskatchewan
- Region: South-central
- Census division: 7
- Rural Municipality: Eyebrow
- Post office Founded: 1908

Government
  - Type: Municipal
  - Governing body: Eyebrow Village Council
  - Mayor: Orlando Bueckert
  - Administrator: Deanne Hartell

Area
  - Total: 2.70 km^{2} (1.04 sq mi)

Population (2016)
  - Total: 119
  - Density: 50/km^{2} (130/sq mi)
- Time zone: UTC-6 (CST)
- Postal code: S0H 1L0
- Area code: 306
- Highways: Highway 42; Highway 367
- Railways: Canadian Pacific Railway

Eyebrow (2016 population: 119) is a village in the Canadian province of Saskatchewan within the Rural Municipality of Eyebrow No. 193 and Census Division No. 7. The community originated at the location that is now the abandoned community of Eskbank several kilometres to the south. Eyebrow is located at the intersection of Highway 367 and Highway 42; 84 km northwest of Moose Jaw, 154 km northwest of Regina and 196 km south of Saskatoon.

== History ==
A post office was established in 1904 called Eyebrow Hill located just south in Sec.12, Twp.20, R.2, W3 of the Dominion Land Survey. Eyebrow Hill was renamed Eskbank in 1908. The post office of Eyebrow Station (Sec.24, Twp.21, R.2, W3) was established in 1908 then was renamed Eyebrow six months later. Eyebrow incorporated as a village on January 8, 1909.

== Geography ==
The Eyebrow Hills and Eye Lake are located north of the village (not to be confused with Eyebrow Lake located in the Qu'Appelle Valley near the village of Tugaske).

== Demographics ==
Population history (1981–2016)
Year	Pop.	±%
1981	168	—
1986	207	+23.2%
1991	169	−18.4%
1996	175	+3.6%
2001	136	−22.3%
2006	135	−0.7%
2011	139	+3.0%
2016	119	−14.4%
Source: Statistics Canada via Saskatchewan Bureau of Statistics

In the 2021 Census of Population conducted by Statistics Canada, Eyebrow had a population of 130 living in 62 of its 73 total private dwellings, a change of 9.2% from its 2016 population of 119. With a land area of 2.52 km^{2} (0.97 sq mi), it had a population density of 51.6/km^{2} (133.6/sq mi) in 2021.

In the 2016 Census of Population, the Village of Eyebrow recorded a population of 119 living in 60 of its 61 total private dwellings, a −16.8% change from its 2011 population of 139. With a land area of 2.7 km^{2} (1.0 sq mi), it had a population density of 44.1/km^{2} (114.2/sq mi) in 2016.

== See also ==
- List of communities in Saskatchewan
- List of francophone communities in Saskatchewan
- List of villages in Saskatchewan
