= Marquis, Saskatchewan =

Village in Saskatchewan, Canada

Marquis
- Village
- Location within Saskatchewan Location within Canada
- Coordinates: 50.618°N 105.719°W
- Country: Canada
- Province: Saskatchewan
- Census division: 7
- Rural municipality: Marquis No. 191
- Incorporated (Village): 1910

Government
  - Councillor: Lorne Froehlich
  - Councillor: Shane Clark

Area
  - Total: 0.63 km^{2} (0.24 sq mi)

Population (2011)
  - Total: 92
  - Density: 145.1/km^{2} (376/sq mi)
- Time zone: CST
- Postal code: S0H 2X0
- Area code: 306
- Highways: Highway 42

Marquis (/ˈmɑːrkwɪs/; 2016 population: 97) is a village in the Canadian province of Saskatchewan within the Rural Municipality of Marquis No. 191 and Census Division No. 7. It is on Highway 42 about 32 km northwest of Moose Jaw.

== History ==
Marquis incorporated as a village on March 21, 1910.

== Demographics ==
Population history (1981–2016)
Year	Pop.	±%
1981	121	—
1986	97	−19.8%
1991	105	+8.2%
1996	98	−6.7%
2001	94	−4.1%
2006	71	−24.5%
2011	92	+29.6%
2016	97	+5.4%
Source: Statistics Canada via Saskatchewan Bureau of Statistics

In the 2021 Census of Population conducted by Statistics Canada, Marquis had a population of 90 living in 39 of its 45 total private dwellings, a change of −7.2% from its 2016 population of 97. With a land area of 0.63 km^{2} (0.24 sq mi), it had a population density of 142.9/km^{2} (370.0/sq mi) in 2021.

In the 2016 Census of Population, the Village of Marquis recorded a population of 97 living in 37 of its 40 total private dwellings, a 5.2% change from its 2011 population of 92. With a land area of 0.63 km^{2} (0.24 sq mi), it had a population density of 154.0/km^{2} (398.8/sq mi) in 2016.

== Economy ==
Businesses and services in the village include a general store/liquor store franchise, a post office, a municipal office, a sand blasting and painting facility, and a service station. The primary economic base is agriculture.

Marquis is located on the Canadian Pacific Railway line. As in many Saskatchewan communities, Marquis's grain elevators were torn down during the 1990s.

== See also ==
- List of communities in Saskatchewan
- List of villages in Saskatchewan
