= Mistusinne =

Village in Saskatchewan, Canada

- Resort village
- Resort Village of Mistusinne
- Location within Saskatchewan Location within Canada
- Coordinates: 51.065°N 106.526°W
- Country: Canada
- Province: Saskatchewan
- Census division: 7
- Rural municipality: RM of Maple Bush No. 224
- Incorporated: August 1, 1980

Government
  - Mayor: Lloyd Montgomery
  - Governing body: Resort Village Council

Area (2016)
  - Land: 1.49 km^{2} (0.58 sq mi)

Population (2016)
  - Total: 77
  - Density: 51.7/km^{2} (134/sq mi)
- Time zone: CST
  - Summer (DST): CST
- Area codes: 306 and 639
- Highway(s): Highway 19
- Railway(s): Canadian Pacific Railway (abandoned)
- Waterway(s): Gordon McKenzie Arm of Lake Diefenbaker
- Website: Official website

Mistusinne (2016 population: 77) is a resort village in the Canadian province of Saskatchewan within Census Division No. 7. It is on the eastern shore of Gordon McKenzie Arm of Lake Diefenbaker in the Rural Municipality of Maple Bush No. 224.

== History ==
The resort village's name is derived from the Plains Cree word mistasiniy or mistaseni (meaning "big stone"), which refers to a 400-ton glacial erratic that resembled a sleeping bison. It once rested in the Qu'Appelle Valley and served as a sacred gathering place for the Cree and Assiniboine peoples before Lake Diefenbaker was built. During the South Saskatchewan River dam project, the erratic was in the flood path of the new reservoir that would become Lake Diefenbaker. In 1966, the Prairie Farm Rehabilitation Administration had the rock blasted apart with explosives, despite efforts by groups to save it. Pieces of the rock were used in monuments to Chief Poundmaker and a memorial to the boulder itself in Elbow. Large fragments were located under the waters of the lake in 2014.

Mistusinne incorporated as a resort village on August 1, 1980.

== Demographics ==
Population history (1981–2016)
Year	Pop.	±%
1981	3	—
1986	16	+433.3%
1991	23	+43.8%
1996	18	−21.7%
2001	31	+72.2%
2006	56	+80.6%
2011	66	+17.9%
2016	77	+16.7%
Source: Statistics Canada via Saskatchewan Bureau of Statistics

In the 2021 Census of Population conducted by Statistics Canada, Mistusinne had a population of 118 living in 56 of its 244 total private dwellings, a change of 53.2% from its 2016 population of 77. With a land area of 1.92 km^{2} (0.74 sq mi), it had a population density of 61.5/km^{2} (159.2/sq mi) in 2021.

In the 2016 Census of Population conducted by Statistics Canada, the Resort Village of Mistusinne recorded a population of 77 living in 38 of its 244 total private dwellings, a 16.7% change from its 2011 population of 66. With a land area of 1.49 km^{2} (0.58 sq mi), it had a population density of 51.7/km^{2} (133.8/sq mi) in 2016.

== Attractions ==
Douglas Provincial Park extends from the community to the Qu'Appelle River Dam. It is about 8 kilometres (5.0 mi) south of the village of Elbow on Highway 19. The community serves as a summer retreat that contains many cabins and a golf course, with a view of Lake Diefenbaker. Part of the golf course along the shore had to be rebuilt when Lake Diefenbaker's water rose in 1998 and collapsed the shoreline.

== Government ==
The resort village of Mistusinne is governed by an elected municipal council and an appointed clerk that meets on the third Saturday of every month. The mayor is Lloyd Montgomery and its clerk is .

== See also ==
- List of communities in Saskatchewan
- List of municipalities in Saskatchewan
- List of resort villages in Saskatchewan
- List of villages in Saskatchewan
- List of summer villages in Alberta
- List of place names in Canada of Indigenous origin
