= Blair Jones =

Canadian ice hockey player

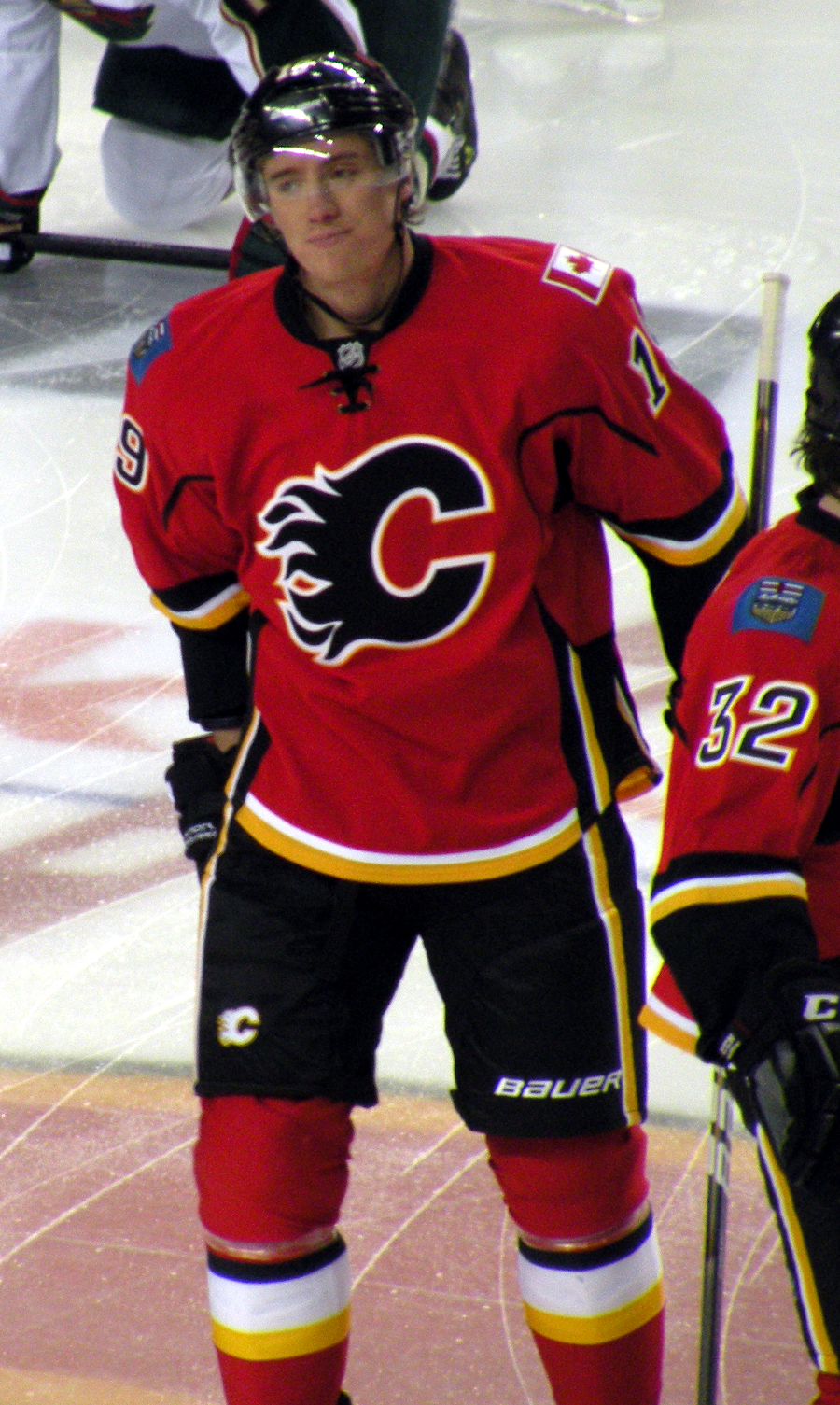
- Blair Jones
- Born: September 27, 1986 (age 39) Central Butte, Saskatchewan, Canada
- Height: 6 ft 3 in (191 cm)
- Weight: 210 lb (95 kg; 15 st 0 lb)
- Position: Centre
- Shot: Right
- Played for: Tampa Bay Lightning; Calgary Flames; Philadelphia Flyers; Iserlohn Roosters; Kölner Haie; HC Sparta Praha
- NHL draft: 102nd overall, 2005; Tampa Bay Lightning
- Playing career: 2006–2019

Blair Jones (born September 27, 1986) is a Canadian former professional ice hockey player. He was a selection of the Tampa Bay Lightning, taken 102nd overall at the 2005 NHL entry draft, and played five seasons within the Lightning organization before joining the Calgary Flames in 2012. Jones was born in Central Butte, Saskatchewan, but grew up in Craik, Saskatchewan.

== Playing career ==
Jones played four years of junior hockey, in the Western Hockey League (WHL) for the Red Deer Rebels and Moose Jaw Warriors between 2002 and 2006. In his final junior season, 2005–06, Jones finished sixth in WHL scoring with 85 points and helped the Warriors reach the league final. The Warriors lost the championship to the Vancouver Giants, but Jones was named to the East Division second all-star team.

The Tampa Bay Lightning selected him with their fourth round selection, 102nd overall, at the 2005 NHL entry draft. He turned professional in 2006–07, spending the majority of the season with Tampa Bay's American Hockey League (AHL) affiliate, the Springfield Falcons. He was recalled to Tampa early in the season and made his NHL debut on November 20, 2006, against the Buffalo Sabres. Two nights later he scored his first point, an assist, against the Florida Panthers. He scored his first NHL goal on January 30, 2007, against goaltender Sean Burke of the Los Angeles Kings. Jones finished the season with one goal and three points in 20 NHL games.

The following two seasons were spent with Tampa Bay's new top affiliate, the AHL's Norfolk Admirals. In the 2009–10 AHL season, Jones represented the Admirals at the 2010 AHL All-Star game and won the hardest shot competition at the game, registering a winning total of 100.3 miles per hour (161.4 km/h). He appeared in 14 NHL games that season, and another 18 in 2010–11. His 55 points with Norfolk in 2010–11 ranked second on the team.

Jones appeared in 22 games with the Lightning in 2011–12 before he was sent to the Calgary Flames in a trade for Brendan Mikkelson on January 6, 2012. Jones was expected to contribute to the Flames as a defensive specialist, used on the forecheck and in penalty killing situations. However, he suffered a broken ankle in early February after blocking a shot that was expected keep him out of the lineup for up to six weeks. On June 29, 2012, Jones re-signed with the Flames on a two-year contract.

On July 1, 2014, Jones left the Flames organization as a free agent and signed a one-year two-way contract with the Philadelphia Flyers.

On July 3, 2015, Jones again signed a one-year, two-way contract as a free agent with the Vancouver Canucks. After training camp and pre-season with the Canucks, Jones was assigned to begin the 2015–16 season with the Utica Comets of the AHL. Jones appeared in 36 games with the Comets before he was loaned to the Charlotte Checkers, affiliate of the Carolina Hurricanes, in an exchange for T.J. Hensick on March 7, 2016.

On August 29, 2016, Jones landed his first contract overseas, signing with the Iserlohn Roosters of the German top-flight Deutsche Eishockey Liga (DEL). He parted ways with the club on January 27, 2017, after being suspended for ten days.

== Career statistics ==
| | | | Regular season | | | | | Playoffs |
| Season | Team | League | GP | G | A | Pts | PIM | GP | G | A | Pts | PIM |
|---|---|---|---|---|---|---|---|---|---|---|---|---|
| 2002–03 | Red Deer Rebels | WHL | 37 | 3 | 4 | 7 | 17 | 10 | 1 | 0 | 1 | 0 |
| 2003–04 | Red Deer Rebels | WHL | 72 | 9 | 22 | 31 | 55 | 19 | 1 | 5 | 6 | 25 |
| 2004–05 | Red Deer Rebels | WHL | 39 | 7 | 18 | 25 | 48 | — | — | — | — | — |
| 2004–05 | Moose Jaw Warriors | WHL | 29 | 7 | 18 | 25 | 30 | 5 | 2 | 5 | 7 | 8 |
| 2005–06 | Moose Jaw Warriors | WHL | 72 | 35 | 50 | 85 | 85 | 22 | 9 | 12 | 21 | 45 |
| 2006–07 | Tampa Bay Lightning | NHL | 20 | 1 | 2 | 3 | 2 | — | — | — | — | — |
| 2006–07 | Springfield Falcons | AHL | 45 | 5 | 16 | 21 | 36 | — | — | — | — | — |
| 2007–08 | Tampa Bay Lightning | NHL | 4 | 0 | 0 | 0 | 0 | — | — | — | — | — |
| 2007–08 | Norfolk Admirals | AHL | 75 | 14 | 28 | 42 | 50 | — | — | — | — | — |
| 2008–09 | Norfolk Admirals | AHL | 80 | 20 | 34 | 54 | 61 | — | — | — | — | — |
| 2009–10 | Tampa Bay Lightning | NHL | 14 | 0 | 0 | 0 | 10 | — | — | — | — | — |
| 2009–10 | Norfolk Admirals | AHL | 63 | 9 | 21 | 30 | 27 | — | — | — | — | — |
| 2010–11 | Tampa Bay Lightning | NHL | 18 | 1 | 2 | 3 | 2 | 7 | 0 | 0 | 0 | 2 |
| 2010–11 | Norfolk Admirals | AHL | 56 | 24 | 31 | 55 | 75 | 4 | 1 | 0 | 1 | 8 |
| 2011–12 | Tampa Bay Lightning | NHL | 22 | 2 | 2 | 4 | 10 | — | — | — | — | — |
| 2011–12 | Calgary Flames | NHL | 21 | 1 | 3 | 4 | 8 | — | — | — | — | — |
| 2012–13 | Calgary Flames | NHL | 15 | 0 | 1 | 1 | 10 | — | — | — | — | — |
| 2012–13 | Abbotsford Heat | AHL | 21 | 3 | 4 | 7 | 23 | — | — | — | — | — |
| 2013–14 | Abbotsford Heat | AHL | 38 | 17 | 21 | 38 | 47 | 4 | 0 | 1 | 1 | 6 |
| 2013–14 | Calgary Flames | NHL | 14 | 2 | 0 | 2 | 21 | — | — | — | — | — |
| 2014–15 | Philadelphia Flyers | NHL | 4 | 0 | 0 | 0 | 2 | — | — | — | — | — |
| 2014–15 | Lehigh Valley Phantoms | AHL | 33 | 9 | 12 | 21 | 46 | — | — | — | — | — |
| 2015–16 | Utica Comets | AHL | 36 | 9 | 6 | 15 | 35 | — | — | — | — | — |
| 2015–16 | Charlotte Checkers | AHL | 13 | 4 | 3 | 7 | 20 | — | — | — | — | — |
| 2016–17 | Iserlohn Roosters | DEL | 30 | 7 | 12 | 19 | 129 | — | — | — | — | — |
| 2017–18 | Kölner Haie | DEL | 32 | 8 | 10 | 18 | 80 | 6 | 3 | 0 | 3 | 6 |
| 2018–19 | HC Sparta Praha | ELH | 6 | 1 | 0 | 1 | 36 | — | — | — | — | — |
| 2018–19 | Craik Warriors | WSHL | 4 | 6 | 11 | 17 | 2 | — | — | — | — | — |
| 2019–20 | Craik Warriors | WSHL | 9 | 11 | 20 | 31 | 8 | 6 | 7 | 12 | 19 | 4 |
| 2020–21 | Craik Warriors | WSHL | 4 | 3 | 10 | 13 | 2 | — | — | — | — | — |
| AHL totals | | | 466 | 116 | 178 | 294 | 436 | 8 | 1 | 1 | 2 | 14 |
| NHL totals | | | 132 | 7 | 10 | 17 | 65 | 7 | 0 | 0 | 0 | 2 |

== Awards and honours ==
| Award | Year |
WHL
| East Second All-Star Team | 2006 |
