= Rural Municipality of Eyebrow No. 193 =

Rural municipality in Saskatchewan, Canada

Eyebrow No. 193
- Rural municipality
- Rural Municipality of Eyebrow No. 193
- Location of the RM of Eyebrow No. 193 in Saskatchewan
- Coordinates: 50.691°N 106.195°W
- Country: Canada
- Province: Saskatchewan
- Census division: 7
- SARM division: 2
- Formed: December 13, 1909

Government
  - Reeve: Michael Cavan
  - Governing body: RM of Eyebrow No. 193 Council
  - Administrator: Chris Bueckert
  - Office location: Eyebrow

Area (2016)
  - Land: 835.04 km^{2} (322.41 sq mi)

Population (2016)
  - Total: 195
  - Density: 0.2/km^{2} (0.52/sq mi)
- Time zone: CST
  - Summer (DST): CST
- Area codes: 306 and 639
- Website: Official website

The Rural Municipality of Eyebrow No. 193 (2016 population: 195) is a rural municipality (RM) in the Canadian province of Saskatchewan within Census Division No. 7 and SARM Division No. 2. It is located in the south-central portion of the province.

== History ==
The RM of Eyebrow No. 193 incorporated as a rural municipality on December 13, 1909.

== Geography ==
=== Communities and localities ===
The following urban municipalities are surrounded by the RM.

Villages

- Brownlee
- Eyebrow

The following unincorporated communities are within the RM.

Localities

- Darmody (dissolved as a village, December 31, 1967)
- Eskbank
- Lake Valley
- Mawer (dissolved as a village, December 31, 1967)

== Demographics ==
Population history (1981–2016)
Year	Pop.	±%
1981	401	—
1986	388	−3.2%
1991	379	−2.3%
1996	318	−16.1%
2001	305	−4.1%
2006	245	−19.7%
2011	230	−6.1%
2016	195	−15.2%
Source: Statistics Canada via Saskatchewan Bureau of Statistics

In the 2021 Census of Population conducted by Statistics Canada, the RM of Eyebrow No. 193 had a population of 220 living in 86 of its 102 total private dwellings, a change of 12.8% from its 2016 population of 195. With a land area of 830.73 km^{2} (320.75 sq mi), it had a population density of 0.3/km^{2} (0.7/sq mi) in 2021.

In the 2016 Census of Population, the RM of Eyebrow No. 193 recorded a population of 195 living in 82 of its 89 total private dwellings, a −15.2% change from its 2011 population of 230. With a land area of 835.04 km^{2} (322.41 sq mi), it had a population density of 0.2/km^{2} (0.6/sq mi) in 2016.

== Government ==
The RM of Eyebrow No. 193 is governed by an elected municipal council and an appointed administrator that meets on the second Wednesday of every month. The reeve of the RM is Michael Cavan while its administrator is Chris Bueckert. The RM's office is located in Eyebrow.

== Transportation ==
- Saskatchewan Highway 19
- Saskatchewan Highway 42
- Saskatchewan Highway 367
- Saskatchewan Highway 627
- Canadian Pacific Railway
