= Beaver Flat =

Resort village in Saskatchewan, Canada

- Resort village
- Resort Village of Beaver Flat
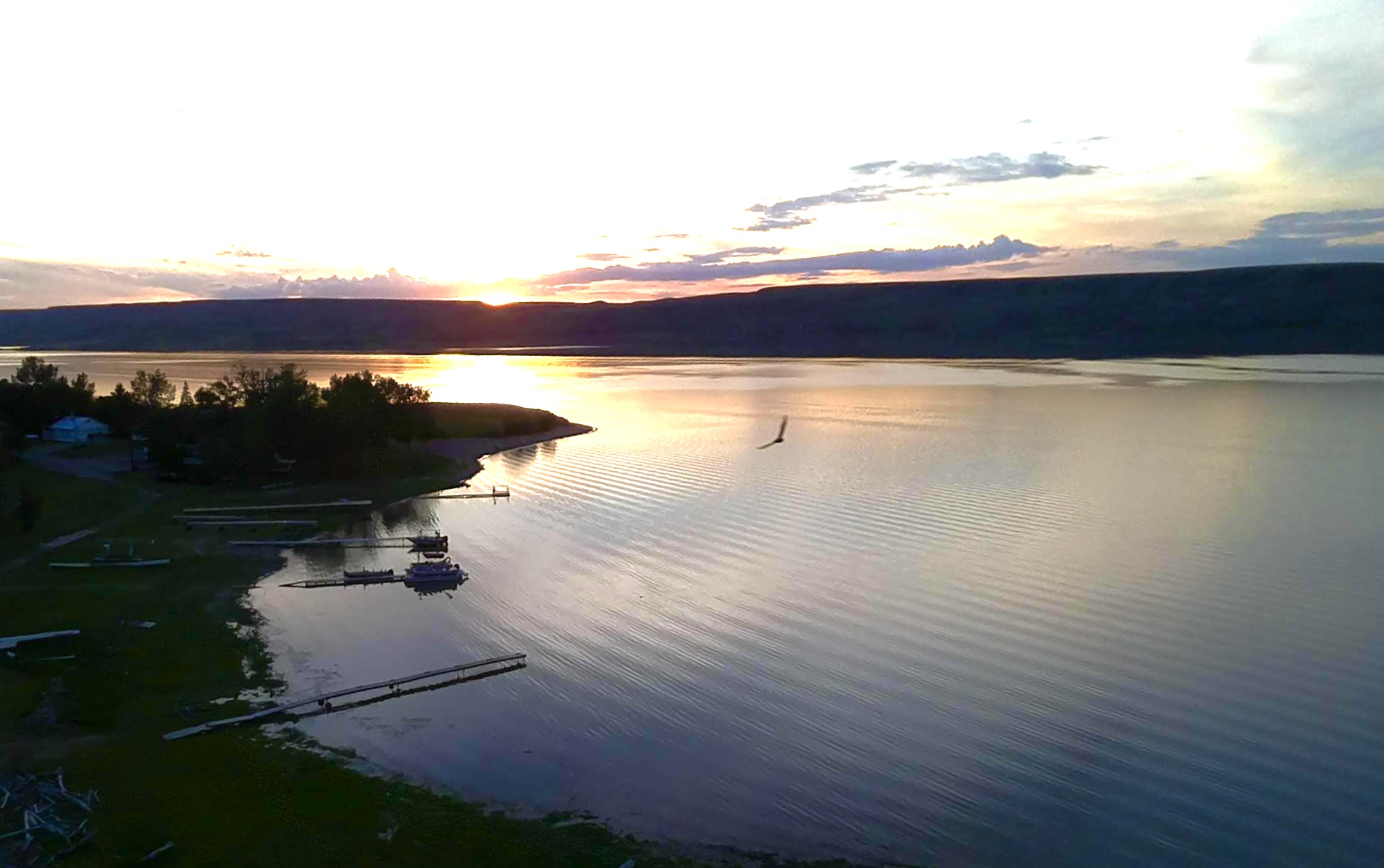
- Aerial photograph of Lake Diefenbaker, Beaver Flat

- Location within Saskatchewan Location within Canada
- Coordinates: 50.662°N 107.663°W
- Country: Canada
- Province: Saskatchewan
- Census division: 7
- Rural municipality: RM of Excelsior No. 166
- Incorporated: April 1, 1981

Government
  - Mayor: Bill Bresett
  - Governing body: Resort Village Council
  - Administrator: Betty Moller

Area (2021)
  - Land: 0.89 km^{2} (0.34 sq mi)

Population (2021)
  - Total: 82
  - Density: 92.1/km^{2} (239/sq mi)
- Time zone: CST
  - Summer (DST): CST
- Postal code: S9H 3X1
- Area codes: 306 and 639
- Highway(s): Highway 628
- Waterway(s): South Saskatchewan River
- Website: Official website

Beaver Flat (2021 population: 82) is a resort village in the Canadian province of Saskatchewan within Census Division No. 7. It is on the southern shore of Lake Diefenbaker in the Rural Municipality of Excelsior No. 166. It is at the end of Highway 628, approximately 57 kilometres (35 mi) north of Swift Current.

== History ==
Beaver Flat incorporated as a resort village on April 1, 1981.]

== Demographics ==
Population history (1986–2021)
Year	Pop.	±%
1986	15	—
1991	23	+53.3%
1996	27	+17.4%
2001	21	−22.2%
2006	58	+176.2%
2011	40	−31.0%
2016	72	+80.0%
2021	82	+13.9%
Source: Statistics Canada via Saskatchewan Bureau of Statistics

In the 2021 Census of Population conducted by Statistics Canada, Beaver Flat had a population of 82 living in 41 of its 128 total private dwellings, a change of 13.9% from its 2016 population of 72. With a land area of 0.89 km^{2} (0.34 sq mi), it had a population density of 92.1/km^{2} (238.6/sq mi) in 2021.

In the 2016 Census of Population conducted by Statistics Canada, the Resort Village of Beaver Flat recorded a population of 72 living in 36 of its 127 total private dwellings, an 80% change from its 2011 population of 40. With a land area of 0.92 km^{2} (0.36 sq mi), it had a population density of 78.3/km^{2} (202.7/sq mi) in 2016.

== Government ==
The Resort Village of Beaver Flat is governed by an elected municipal council and an appointed administrator. The mayor is Bill Bresett and its administrator is Betty Moller.

== See also ==
- List of communities in Saskatchewan
- List of municipalities in Saskatchewan
- List of resort villages in Saskatchewan
- List of villages in Saskatchewan
- List of summer villages in Alberta
