= Lake Diefenbaker =

Lake in Saskatchewan, Canada

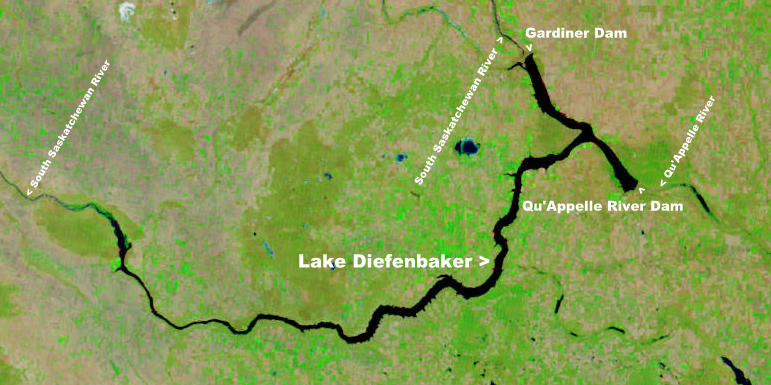
- NASA satellite image of Lake Diefenbaker

- Location in Saskatchewan Lake Diefenbaker (Canada)
- Location: Saskatchewan
- Coordinates: 51°01′53″N 106°50′09″W
- Type: Reservoir
- Part of: Saskatchewan River drainage basin
- Primary inflows: South Saskatchewan River
- River sources: Rocky Mountains
- Primary outflows: South Saskatchewan River; Qu'Appelle River
- Catchment area: 135,500 km^{2} (52,300 sq mi)
- Basin countries: Canada
- Max. length: 225 km (140 mi)
- Max. width: 6 km (3.7 mi)
- Surface area: 430 km^{2} (170 sq mi)
- Average depth: 21.6 m (71 ft)
- Max. depth: 66 m (217 ft)
- Water volume: 9.4 km^{3} (7,600,000 acre⋅ft)
- Residence time: 2.5 years
- Shore length^{1}: 800 km (500 mi)
- Surface elevation: 556.8 m (1,827 ft) above sea level (full supply level)
- Settlements: Elbow; Mistusinne
- ^{1} Shore length is not a well-defined measure.

Lake Diefenbaker is a reservoir and bifurcation lake in the southern part of the Canadian province of Saskatchewan. It was formed by the construction of the Gardiner Dam and the Qu'Appelle River Dam across the South Saskatchewan and Qu'Appelle Rivers respectively. Construction began in 1959 and the lake was filled in 1967. Lake Diefenbaker is the largest body of water in southern Saskatchewan, although Last Mountain Lake is the largest naturally occurring one. The lake was named after John G. Diefenbaker, a former Prime Minister of Canada.

Lake Diefenbaker provides water for domestic irrigation, drinking, and industrial uses. An extensive aqueduct (canal) system was built from the Gardiner Dam called the South Saskatchewan River Project. From the east-side of Gardiner Dam, the aqueduct system heads in a generally north-easterly direction ending at Dellwood Reservoir north-east of Little Manitou Lake in the RM of Usborne No. 310. Reservoirs along the course of the canal include Broderick Reservoir, Brightwater Reservoir, Indi Lake, Blackstrap Lake, Bradwell Reservoir, and Zelma Reservoir.

Along the lake's shores, there are several parks, protected areas, and communities.

== Description ==
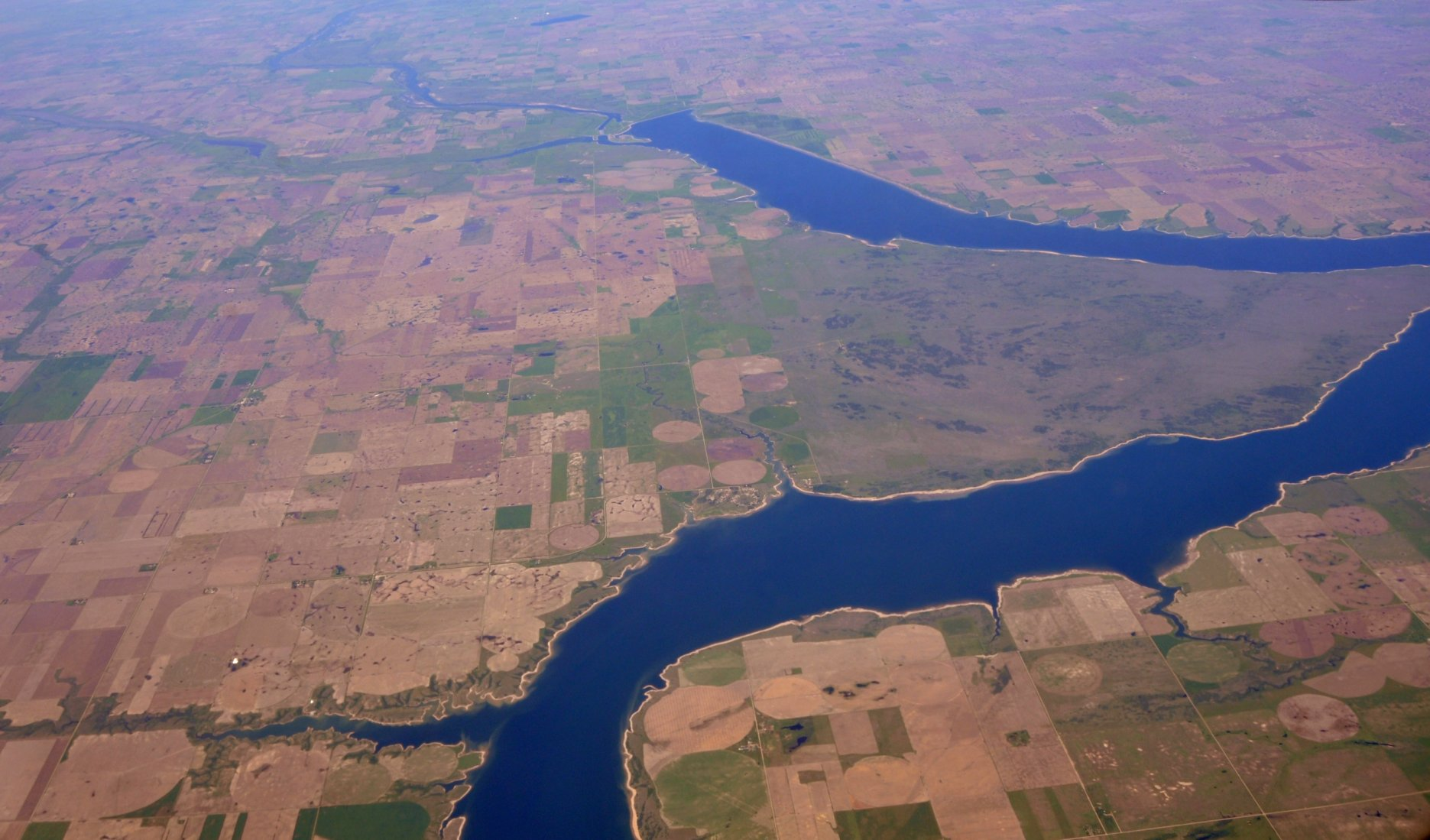
Aerial view of Lake Diefenbaker

Lake Diefenbaker was created with the construction of the Gardiner Dam along the South Saskatchewan River and the Qu'Appelle Dam along the Qu'Appelle River. The lake filled the South Saskatchewan River Valley with the two dams hemming it in. The South Saskatchewan River is the primary inflow and it enters at the west end. Most of the length of the lake runs east–west following the valley. At the lake's east end, near Elbow, it branches off into two arms — the northward Thomson Arm and the southward Gordon McKenzie Arm. Gardiner Dam is at the end of the Thomson Arm and the Qu'Appelle Dam is at the end of the Gordon McKenzie Arm. The outward flow of the two rivers is now regulated with a considerable portion of the South Saskatchewan diverted into the Qu'Appelle. Prior to the dams' construction, high water levels in the South Saskatchewan would frequently cause dangerous ice conditions downstream in Saskatoon while the Qu'Appelle would frequently dry up in the summer months.

Lake Diefenbaker is 225 kilometres (140 mi) long with approximately 800 kilometres (500 mi) of shoreline. It has a maximum depth of 66 metres (217 ft), while the water levels regularly fluctuate 3–9 metres (9–27 feet) each year.

== Mistaseni ==
Before the creation of Lake Diefenbaker, a glacial erratic weighing 400 tons located in the Qu'Appelle Valley had been a historic gathering place for Plains Cree and other Indigenous peoples for millennia. The rock, called mistasiniy in Cree and also anglicized as Mistaseni, would have been submerged under the new reservoir, and an effort began to save the rock by moving it to higher ground. Advocates included elder Wilfred Tootoosis from the Poundmaker Cree First Nation and archaeology professor Zenon S. Pohorecky of the University of Saskatchewan, who sought to increase awareness of the historical and cultural value of Mistasiniy. This campaign was unsuccessful, and according to David McLennan, "many believe a "quiet" decision was made to quell the lobby" when the Prairie Farm Rehabilitation Administration used dynamite to destroy the rock on December 1, 1966. Much of the rubble remains submerged under the lake, and some fragments were used in a cairn at Elbow Harbour or placed as a monument at the grave of Chief Poundmaker. In 2014, a diver from Saskatoon sought to make a documentary about Mistasiniy and locate the site within the lake, and expressed his confidence that he had found the remnants of the rock.

== Communities and access ==
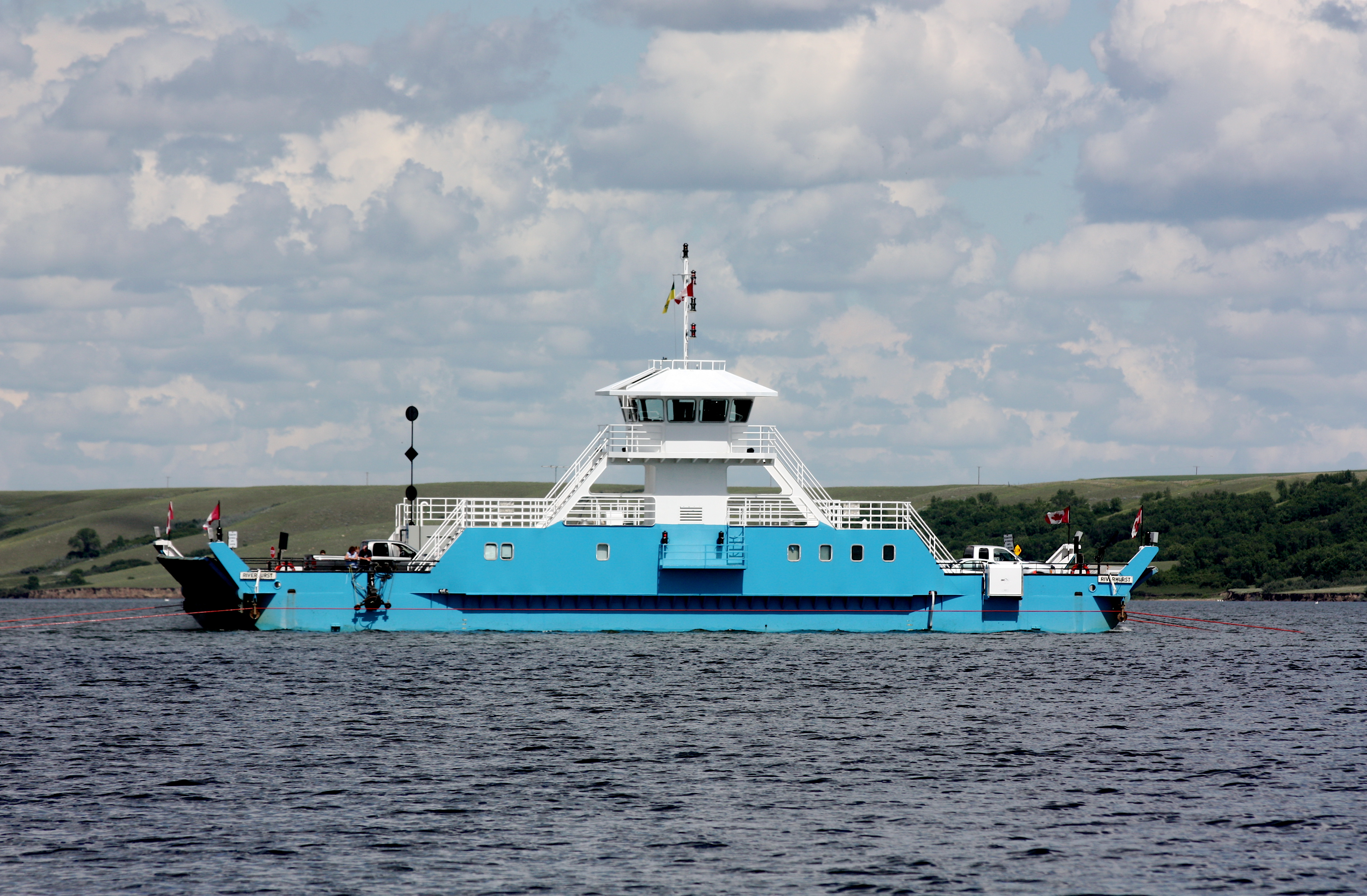
The Riverhurst Ferry

There are many communities found around the lake with several provincial highways providing access. Two of the highways, 4 and 42, cross the lake. The Riverhurst Ferry, which is part of Highway 42 and a cable ferry, crosses Lake Diefenbaker connecting Riverhurst on the south bank to Lucky Lake on the north bank. Highway 4 crosses via a causeway and a bridge at the western end of the lake. Other highways include 19, 44 (which crosses the Gardiner Dam), and 628.

Communities found at the lake include Elbow, Mistusinne, Hitchcock Bay, Cutbank, Coteau Beach, Riverhurst, and Beaver Flat.

== Ecology ==
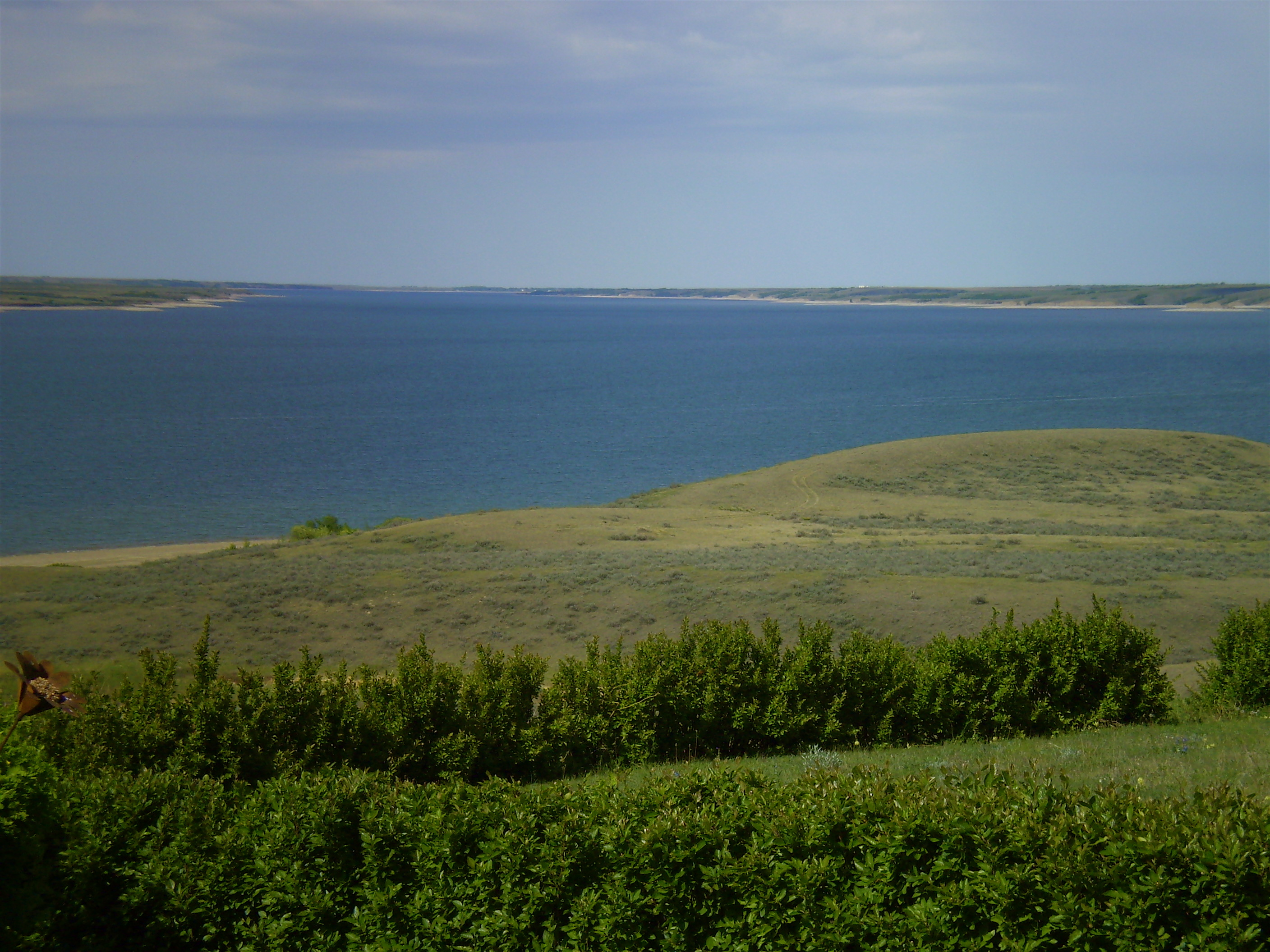
Lake Diefenbaker in autumn, picture taken near Riverhurst

Lake Diefenbaker is home to 26 native and stocked fish species. These include burbot, walleye, northern pike, lake whitefish, lake trout, sauger, goldeye, cisco, yellow perch, rainbow trout, lake sturgeon, longnose sucker, white sucker, sauger, burbot, mooneye, and shorthead redhorse. Both the current world-record rainbow trout and world-record burbot were caught in the lake. The lake itself along with Battle Creek are the only two bodies of water in Saskatchewan that support a reproducing population of rainbow trout.

The lake's sandy beaches provide appropriate habitat for the nationally endangered piping plover.

The long stretches of open water and poorly consolidated shore materials makes the shores vulnerable to erosion. Between 1968 and 1992 bank recession rates have commonly ranged up to 3 metres (9.8 ft) a year with higher rates in exposed areas.

== Parks and recreation ==
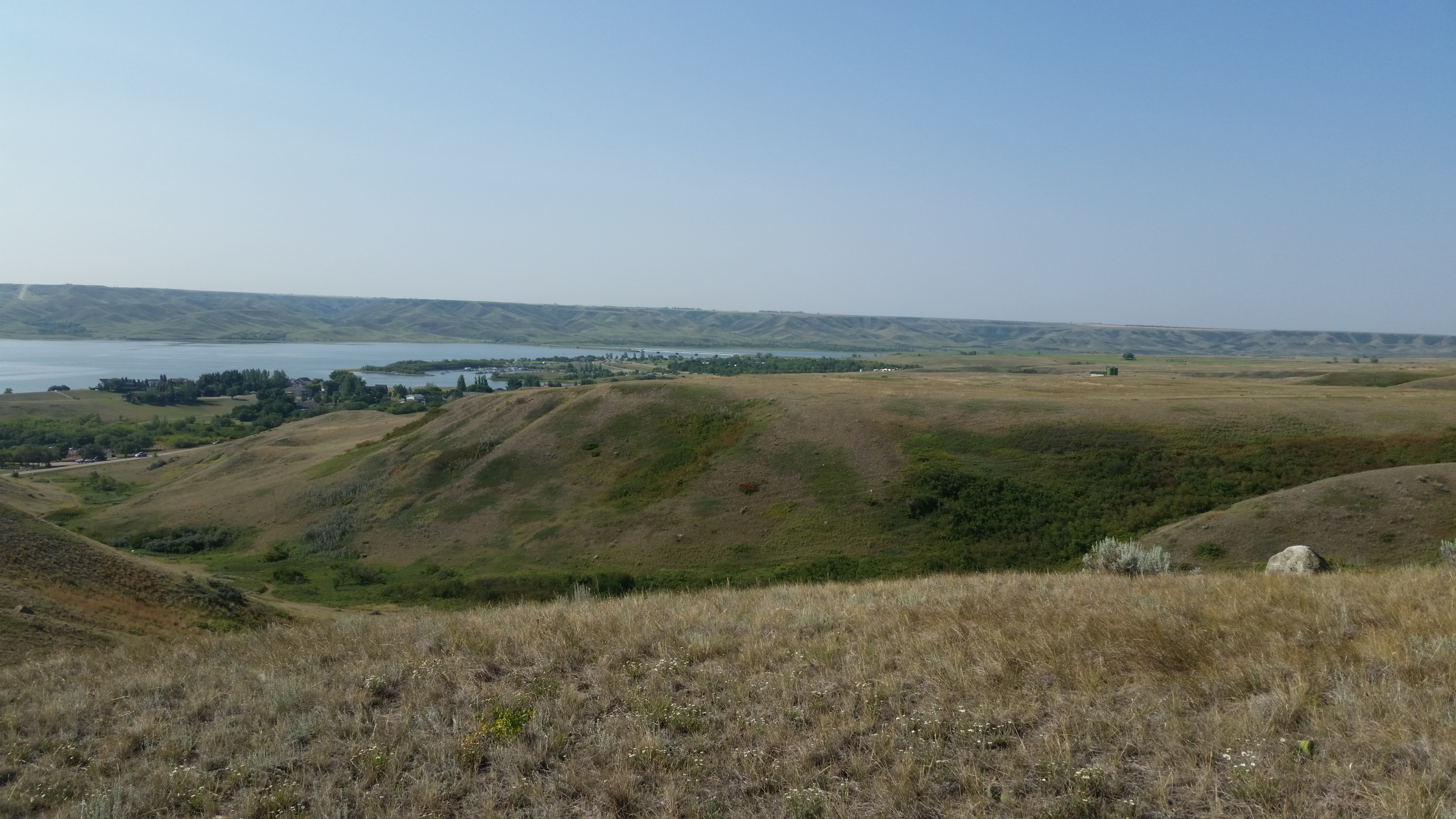
Saskatchewan Landing Provincial Park

There are several parks and recreational amenities at Lake Diefenbaker. Some of the activities and facilities include fishing, swimming, boating, picnicking, hiking, and camping.

- Danielson Provincial Park is at the northern end of Thomson Arm. It encompasses Gardiner Dam and has a campground, beach, boat launch, and picnic area.
- Douglas Provincial Park is at the southern end of the Gordon McKenzie Arm. It encompasses the Qu'Appelle River Dam and has a campground, picnic area, access to the lake, and sand dunes.
- Saskatchewan Landing Provincial Park is at the western end of the lake. It has the historic Goodwin House, a campground, picnic area, beach, and a boat launch.
- Palliser Regional Park is about 8 km (5.0 mi) west of Riverhurst. The park has a campground, golf course, and a marina.
- Cabri Regional Park is on the southern shore and has a campground, beach access, a marina, boat launch, picnic area, and hiking trails.
- Prairie Lake Regional Park has a campground, marina, boat launch, playground, picnic area, and a beach.
- Elbow Harbour Recreation Site is at the town of Elbow. It has a marina with a boat launch, mooring, and fuel.

== Important Bird Areas ==
There are two Important Bird Areas (IBA) of Canada on Lake Diefenbaker, with one at each end.

Galloway and Miry Bay (SK006) is located at the western end of the lake about 20 kilometres (12 mi) north of Cabri. The IBA site includes the shoreline and spans the width of the lake covering an area of 59.48 km^{2} (22.97 sq mi). Miry Bay is located on the western shore and Galloway is on the eastern shore about 5 kilometres (3.1 mi) to the north. Geese found in Miry and Galloway Bays include the greater white-fronted, snow, and Ross's. Sandhill cranes are also found at the site.

East Lake Diefenbaker (SK055) is located at the eastern end of the lake. It totals 361.69 km^{2} (139.65 sq mi) and encompasses most of both the Gordon McKenzie and Thomson Arms of the lake. This IBA is designated as critical piping plover habitat.

== See also ==
- List of lakes of Saskatchewan
- List of dams and reservoirs in Canada
- List of generating stations in Saskatchewan
