= Eskbank, Saskatchewan =

Community in Saskatchewan, Canada

Coordinates: 50.670°N 106.143°W

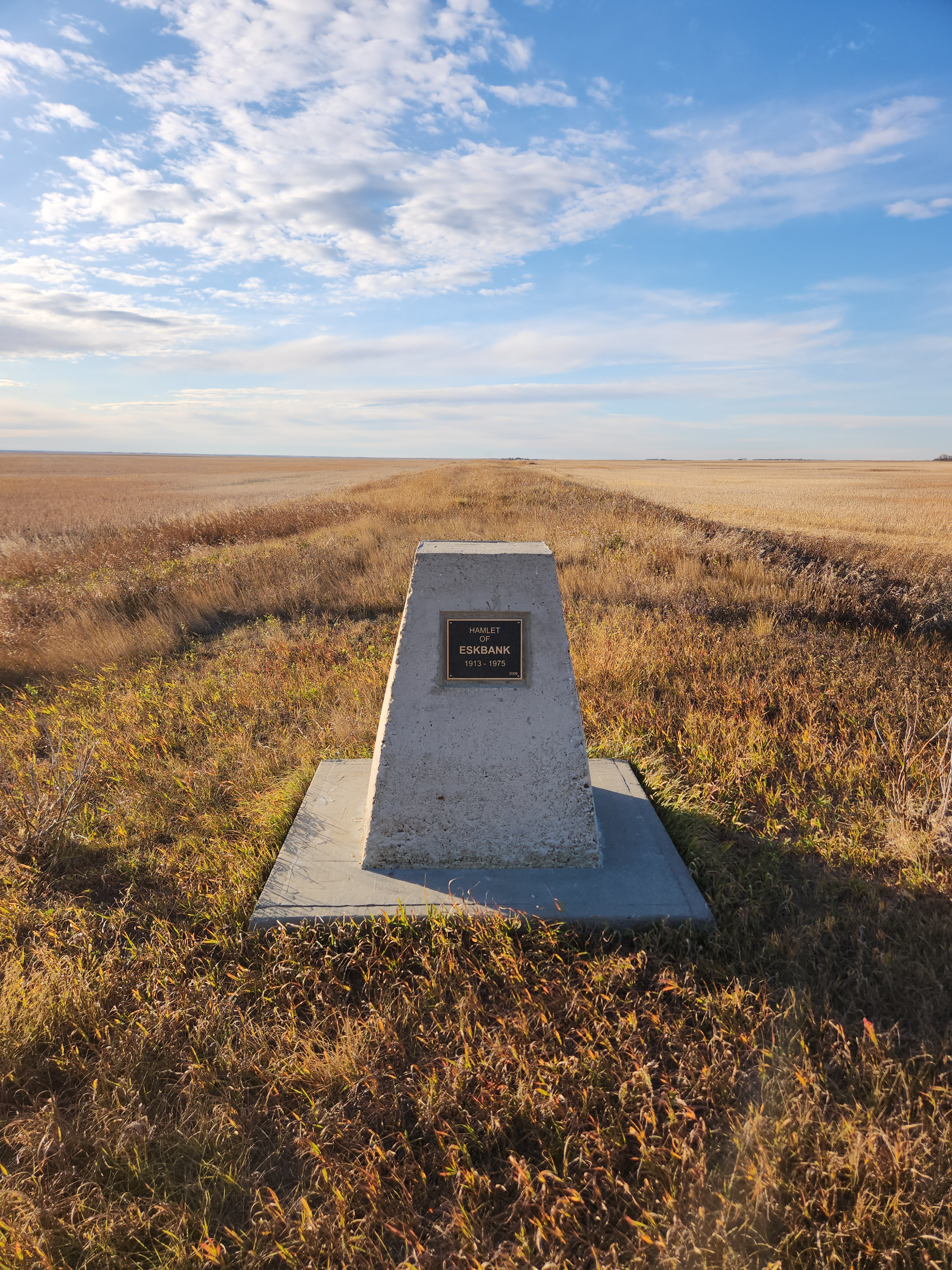
Marker with plaque at the location where Eskbank was located. The marker is on the CNR right of way.

Eskbank is an unincorporated community in the Rural Municipality of Eyebrow No. 193, Saskatchewan, Canada. The community is about 15 kilometres (9.3 mi) south of Highway 42 on Range Road 20, approximately 50 kilometres (31 mi) northwest of the city of Moose Jaw. It is located on the former Grand Trunk Pacific (Canadian National Railway) Central Butte Subdivision from Moose Jaw to Riverhurst.

== History ==
Today, nothing remains of Eskbank. A historical plaque, placed in 2009, denotes the town's former location. The post office of Eyebrow Hill was established 1 June 1904 in the home of John William Hudson and was renamed "Eskbank" on 1 June 1908 after Eskbank, Scotland. The post office closed on 30 June 1964 (its last Postmaster resigned effective 28 March that year). The last remaining buildings were burned by the rural municipality in 1975. The derelict Saskatchewan Wheat Pool grain elevator built in 1924 by McCabe and closed in 1984 was deliberately burned on 9 November 2009.

== See also ==
- List of communities in Saskatchewan
- Eskbank Grain Elevator
