= Darmody, Saskatchewan =

Community in Saskatchewan, Canada

Coordinates: 50.715°N 106.290°W

Darmody is an unincorporated community in the Rural Municipality of Eyebrow No. 193, Saskatchewan, Canada. It previously held the status of a village until December 31, 1967. Darmody is about 87 kilometres (54 mi) northwest of the city of Moose Jaw on Highway 627.

== See also ==
- List of communities in Saskatchewan
