= Keeler, Saskatchewan =

Keeler
- Special service area
- Location of Keeler in Saskatchewan Keeler (Canada)
- Coordinates: 50.6787°N 105.878°W
- Country: Canada
- Province: Saskatchewan
- Region: Central
- Census division: 7
- Rural Municipality: Marquis No. 191
- Dissolved: December 31, 2020

Area
  - Total: 1.02 km^{2} (0.39 sq mi)

Population (2016)
  - Total: 15
  - Density: 14.7/km^{2} (38/sq mi)
- Time zone: UTC-6 (CST)
- Postal code: S0H 2E0
- Area code: 306
- Highways: Highway 42 Highway 643
- Railways: Canadian Pacific Railway

Keeler (2016 population: 15) is a special service area in the Canadian province of Saskatchewan within the Rural Municipality of Marquis No. 191 and Census Division No. 7. It held village status prior to 2021.

== History ==
Keeler incorporated as a village on July 5, 1910. It relinquished its village status on December 31, 2020, becoming a special service area under the jurisdiction of the Rural Municipality of Marquis No. 191.

== Demographics ==
Population history (1981–2016)
Year	Pop.	±%
1981	50	—
1986	43	−14.0%
1991	27	−37.2%
1996	21	−22.2%
2001	15	−28.6%
2006	5	−66.7%
2011	15	+200.0%
2016	15	+0.0%
Source: Statistics Canada via Saskatchewan Bureau of Statistics

In the 2016 Census of Population conducted by Statistics Canada, Keeler recorded a population of 15 living in 9 of its 10 total private dwellings, a 0% change from its 2011 population of 15. With a land area of 1.02 km^{2} (0.39 sq mi), it had a population density of 14.7/km^{2} (38.1/sq mi) in 2016.

In the 2011 Census of Population, Keeler recorded a population of 15, a 200% change from its 2006 population of 5. With a land area of 1.02 km^{2} (0.39 sq mi), it had a population density of 14.7/km^{2} (38.1/sq mi) in 2011.

== Notable people ==
- Maurine Stuart, one of the first female Zen masters to teach in the United States, was born and raised in Keeler.

== See also ==
- List of communities in Saskatchewan
- List of special service areas in Saskatchewan
