= Lake Valley, Saskatchewan =

Community in Saskatchewan, Canada

Lake Valley
- Hamlet
- Interactive map of Lake Valley
- Coordinates: 50°38′2″N 106°1′53″W
- Country: Canada
- Province: Saskatchewan
- Rural municipality: Eyebrow No. 193
- Time zone: UTC−6 (CST)
- Area code(s): 306, 639, 474

Lake Valley is an unincorporated community in the Rural Municipality of Eyebrow No. 193, Saskatchewan, Canada. The community is about 10 kilometres (6.2 mi) south of Highway 42 on Lake Valley Road (Range Road 3011), approximately 40 kilometres (25 mi) northwest of the city of Moose Jaw. It is located on a former Canadian Pacific Railway line from Moose Jaw to Riverhurst.

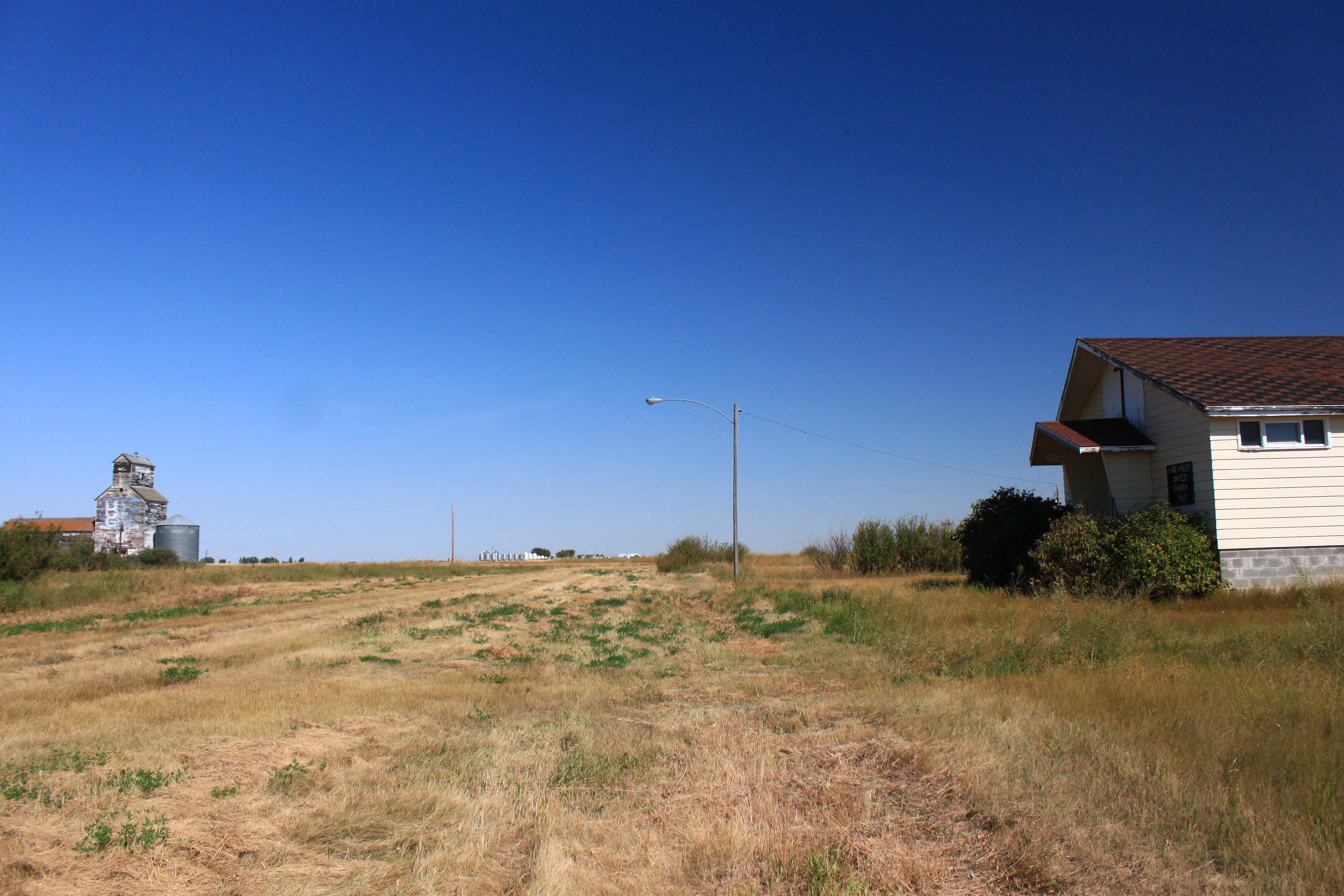
Looking down Main Street

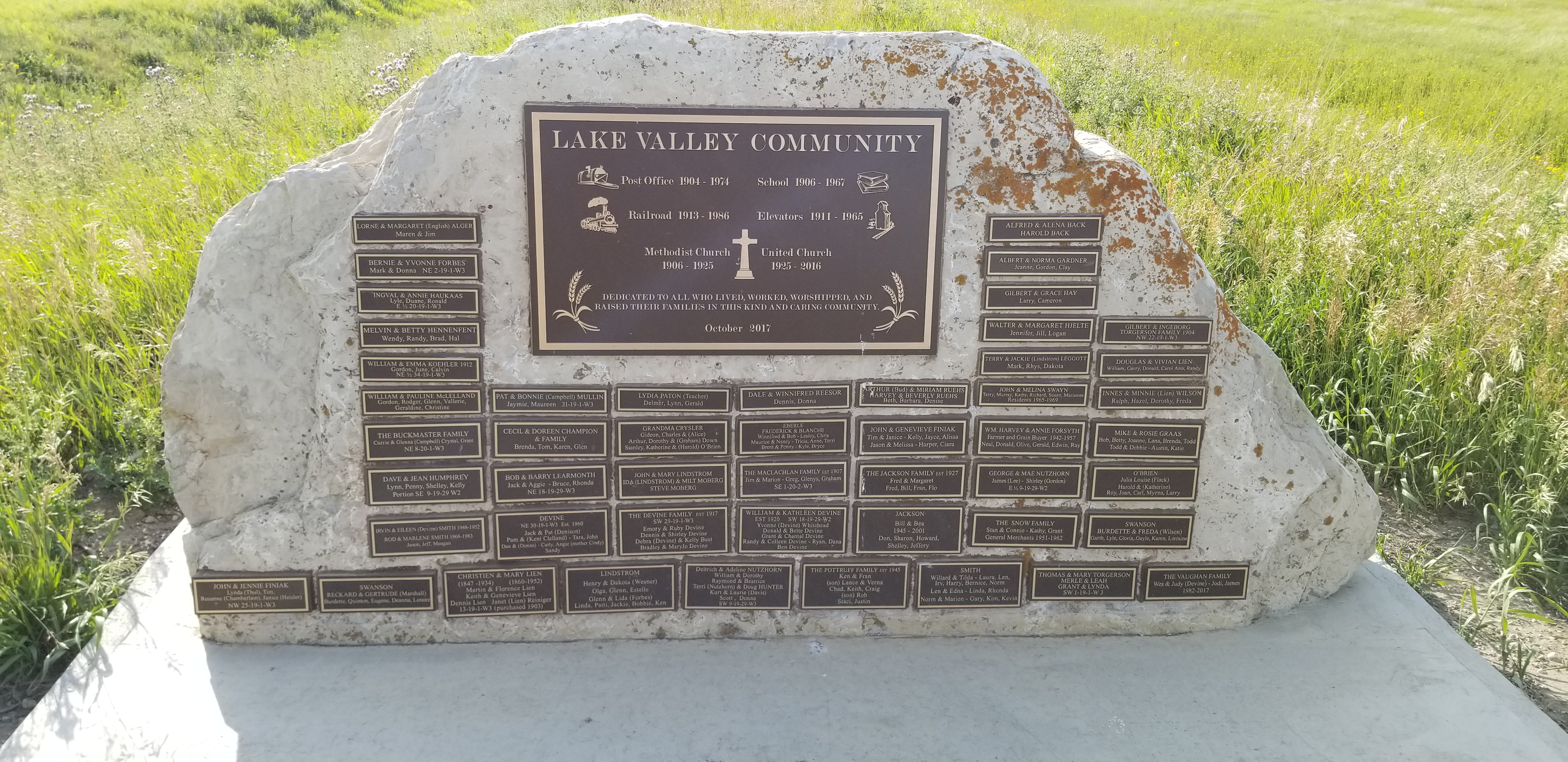
Lake Valley Plaque

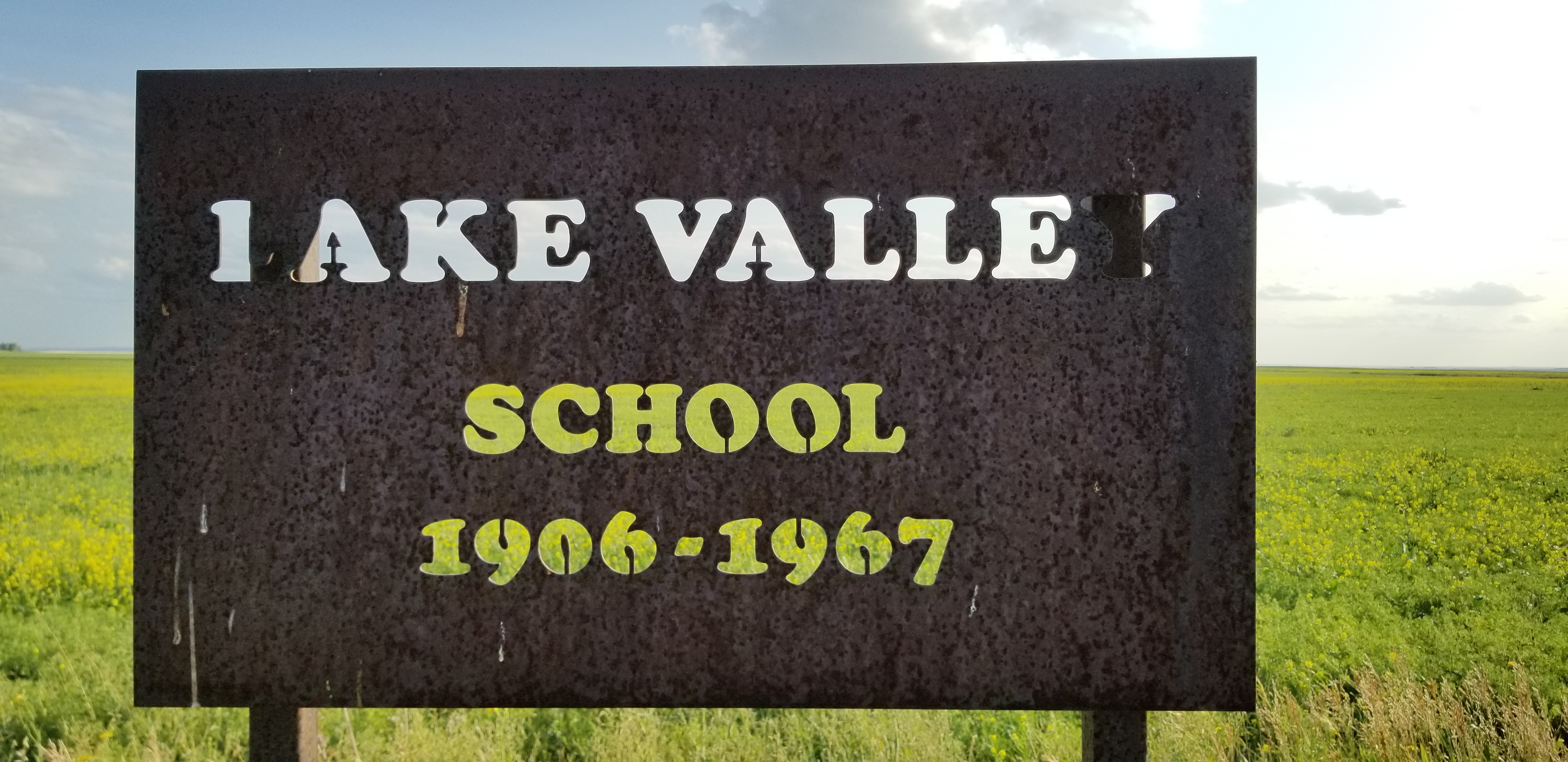
Sign at the old Lake Valley School site

== See also ==
- List of communities in Saskatchewan
