= Brownlee, Saskatchewan =

Village in Saskatchewan, Canada

Brownlee
- Village
- Village of Brownlee
- Location of Brownlee in Saskatchewan Brownlee (Canada)
- Coordinates: 50.739°N 106.015°W
- Country: Canada
- Province: Saskatchewan
- Region: South-central
- Census division: 7
- Rural municipality: Eyebrow No. 193
- Incorporated (Village): August 11, 1908

Government
  - Type: Municipal
  - Governing body: Brownlee Village Council
  - Mayor: Lyle Swanson
  - Administrator: Jackie Leggott

Area
  - Total: 2.42 km^{2} (0.93 sq mi)

Population (2016)
  - Total: 55
  - Density: 20.7/km^{2} (54/sq mi)
- Time zone: UTC-6 (CST)
- Postal code: S0H 0M0
- Area code: 306
- Highways: Highway 42
- Railways: Canadian Pacific Railway (Abandoned)

Brownlee (2016 population: 55) is a village in the Canadian province of Saskatchewan within the Rural Municipality of Eyebrow No. 193 and Census Division No. 7. The village is located approximately 58 kilometres (36 mi) northwest of the city of Moose Jaw on Highway 42.

== History ==
Brownlee incorporated as a village on December 29, 1908.

== Demographics ==
Population history (1981–2016)
| Year | Pop. | ±% |
|---|---|---|
| 1981 | 99 | — |
| 1986 | 89 | −10.1% |
| 1991 | 100 | +12.4% |
| 1996 | 72 | −28.0% |
| 2001 | 55 | −23.6% |
| 2006 | 50 | −9.1% |
| 2011 | 50 | +0.0% |
| 2016 | 55 | +10.0% |
Source: Statistics Canada via Saskatchewan Bureau of Statistics

In the 2021 Census of Population conducted by Statistics Canada, Brownlee had a population of 55 living in 27 of its 29 total private dwellings, a change of 0% from its 2016 population of 55. With a land area of 2.57 km^{2} (0.99 sq mi), it had a population density of 21.4/km^{2} (55.4/sq mi) in 2021.

In the 2016 Census of Population, the Village of Brownlee recorded a population of 55 living in 26 of its 29 total private dwellings, a 9.1% change from its 2011 population of 50. With a land area of 2.42 km^{2} (0.93 sq mi), it had a population density of 22.7/km^{2} (58.9/sq mi) in 2016.

== See also ==
- List of communities in Saskatchewan
- List of villages in Saskatchewan
