= Clarke Wilm =

Canadian ice hockey player

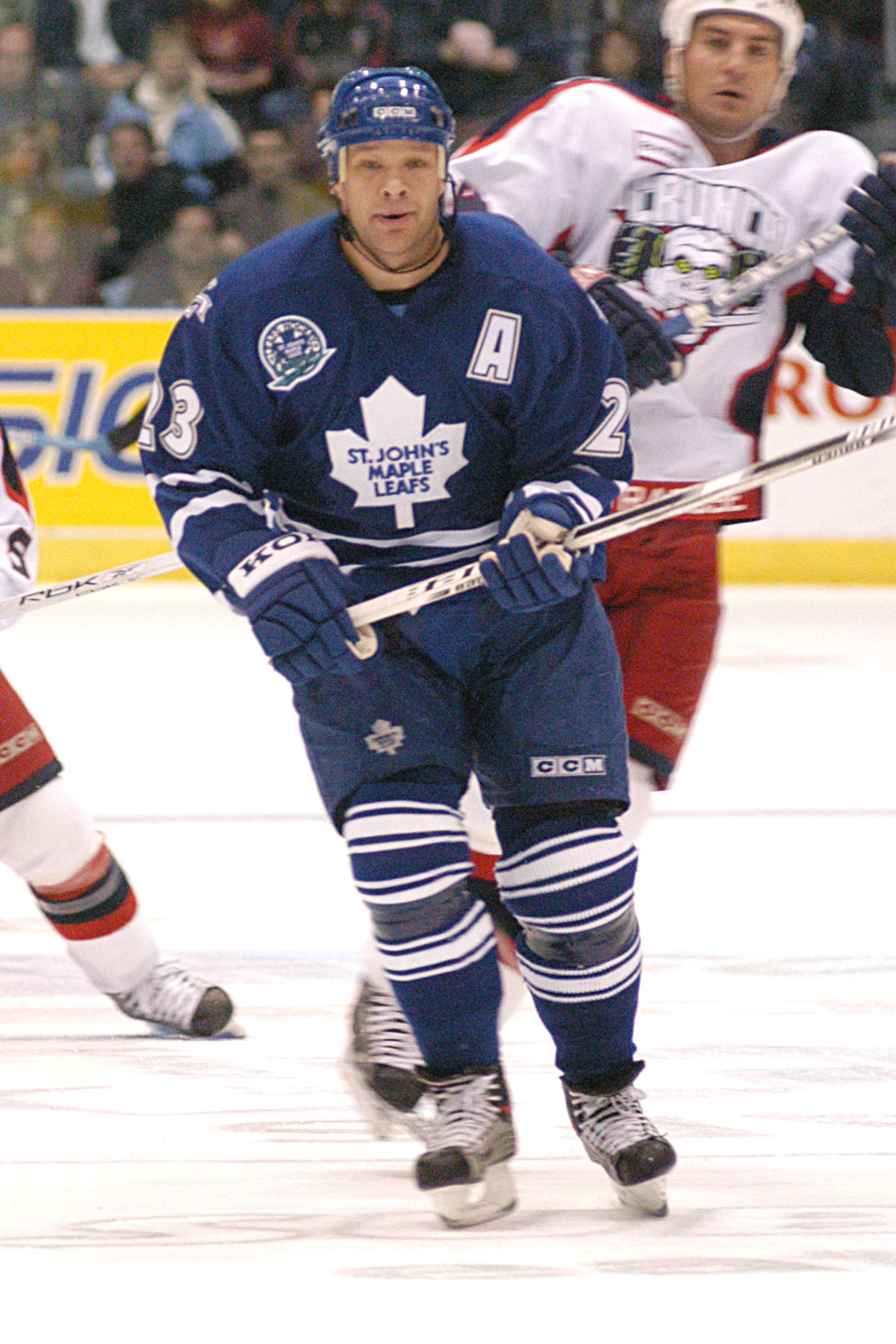
- Wilm with the St. John's Maple Leafs in 2004
- Born: October 24, 1976 (age 49) Central Butte, Saskatchewan, Canada
- Height: 6 ft 0 in (183 cm)
- Weight: 202 lb (92 kg; 14 st 6 lb)
- Position: Centre
- Shot: Left
- Played for: Calgary Flames; Nashville Predators; Toronto Maple Leafs; Jokerit; Hamburg Freezers; Thomas Sabo Ice Tigers
- NHL draft: 150th overall, 1995; Calgary Flames
- Playing career: 1996–2011

Clarke Wilm (born October 24, 1976) is a Canadian former professional ice hockey centre. He played in the National Hockey League (NHL) with the Calgary Flames, Nashville Predators, and Toronto Maple Leafs between 1998 and 2006.

== Playing career ==
Wilm was drafted 150th overall by the Calgary Flames in the 1995 NHL entry draft. He established himself in the NHL in the 1997–98 season after two seasons spent in Calgary's AHL affiliate.

Wilm was known as a checking line centre and penalty killer. He can play all three forward positions.

After missing out on an NHL contract for the 2006–07 season, Wilm joined his former St. John's Maple Leafs coach Doug Shedden to play for Jokerit in Finland.

Wilm's tenure with Jokerit lasted for two seasons, during which Wilm made himself useful as a checking and penalty killing forward.

Wilm was contracted to Germany by the Hamburg Freezers for the 2008–09 season. After two seasons with Hamburg and one season with the Thomas Sabo Ice Tigers, Wilm retired from professional hockey after the 2010–11 season.

== Personal life ==
Wilm was an avid deer hunter as a teenager. His name is spelled Clarke after Hockey Hall of Famer Bobby Clarke.

== Career statistics ==
=== Regular season and playoffs ===
			Regular season					Playoffs
Season	Team	League	GP	G	A	Pts	PIM	GP	G	A	Pts	PIM
1991–92	Saskatoon Blazers AAA	SMHL	36	18	28	46	16	—	—	—	—	—
1991–92	Saskatoon Blades	WHL	—	—	—	—	—	1	0	0	0	0
1992–93	Saskatoon Blades	WHL	69	14	19	33	71	9	4	2	6	13
1993–94	Saskatoon Blades	WHL	70	18	32	50	181	16	0	9	9	19
1994–95	Saskatoon Blades	WHL	71	20	39	59	179	10	6	1	7	21
1995–96	Saskatoon Blades	WHL	72	49	61	110	83	4	1	1	2	4
1996–97	Saint John Flames	AHL	62	9	19	28	107	5	2	0	2	15
1997–98	Saint John Flames	AHL	68	13	26	39	112	21	5	9	14	8
1998–99	Calgary Flames	NHL	78	10	8	18	53	—	—	—	—	—
1999–2000	Calgary Flames	NHL	78	10	12	22	67	—	—	—	—	—
2000–01	Calgary Flames	NHL	81	7	8	15	69	—	—	—	—	—
2001–02	Calgary Flames	NHL	66	4	14	18	61	—	—	—	—	—
2002–03	Nashville Predators	NHL	82	5	11	16	36	—	—	—	—	—
2003–04	St. John's Maple Leafs	AHL	47	16	17	33	97	—	—	—	—	—
2003–04	Toronto Maple Leafs	NHL	10	0	0	0	7	5	0	1	1	2
2004–05	St. John's Maple Leafs	AHL	69	11	16	27	145	5	2	2	4	8
2005–06	Toronto Maple Leafs	NHL	60	1	7	8	43	—	—	—	—	—
2006–07	Jokerit	FIN	40	13	14	27	38	10	2	8	10	14
2007–08	Jokerit	FIN	55	9	24	33	102	14	5	6	11	10
2008–09	Hamburg Freezers	DEL	52	16	25	41	88	9	1	5	6	8
2009–10	Hamburg Freezers	DEL	54	16	32	48	70	—	—	—	—	—
2010–11	Thomas Sabo Ice Tigers	DEL	48	11	22	33	50	2	0	0	0	2
2011–12	Central Butte Flyers	SVHL	2	0	1	1	0	—	—	—	—	—
AHL totals			246	49	78	127	461	31	9	11	20	31
NHL totals			455	37	60	97	336	5	0	1	1	2
