= Rural Municipality of Enfield No. 194 =

Rural municipality in Saskatchewan, Canada

Enfield No. 194
- Rural municipality
- Rural Municipality of Enfield No. 194

- Location of the RM of Enfield No. 194 in Saskatchewan
- Coordinates: 50.717°N 106.666°W
- Country: Canada
- Province: Saskatchewan
- Census division: 7
- SARM division: 2
- Formed: December 13, 1909

Government
  - Reeve: none
  - Governing body: RM of Enfield No. 194 Council
  - Administrator: Joe Van Leuken
  - Office location: Central Butte

Area (2016)
  - Land: 1,014.1 km^{2} (391.5 sq mi)

Population (2016)
  - Total: 226
  - Density: 0.2/km^{2} (0.52/sq mi)
- Time zone: CST
  - Summer (DST): CST
- Area codes: 306 and 639

The Rural Municipality of Enfield No. 194 (2016 population: 226) is a rural municipality (RM) in the Canadian province of Saskatchewan within Census Division No. 7 and SARM Division No. 2.

== History ==
The RM of Enfield No. 194 incorporated as a rural municipality on December 13, 1909.

== Demographics ==
Population history (1981–2016)
Year	Pop.	±%
1981	515	—
1986	494	−4.1%
1991	438	−11.3%
1996	414	−5.5%
2001	356	−14.0%
2006	301	−15.4%
2011	270	−10.3%
2016	226	−16.3%
Source: Statistics Canada via Saskatchewan Bureau of Statistics

In the 2021 Census of Population conducted by Statistics Canada, the RM of Enfield No. 194 had a population of 268 living in 106 of its 116 total private dwellings, a change of 18.6% from its 2016 population of 226. With a land area of 1,003.93 km^{2} (387.62 sq mi), it had a population density of 0.3/km^{2} (0.7/sq mi) in 2021.

In the 2016 Census of Population, the RM of Enfield No. 194 recorded a population of 226 living in 85 of its 97 total private dwellings, a −16.3% change from its 2011 population of 270. With a land area of 1,014.1 km^{2} (391.5 sq mi), it had a population density of 0.2/km^{2} (0.6/sq mi) in 2016.

== Government ==
The RM of Enfield No. 194 is governed by an elected municipal council and an appointed administrator that meets on the second Tuesday of every month. The council comprises six councillors while the RM's administrator is Joe Van Leuken. The RM's office is located in Central Butte.
