= Rural Municipality of King George No. 256 =

Rural municipality in Saskatchewan, Canada

King George No. 256
- Rural municipality
- Rural Municipality of King George No. 256

- Location of the RM of King George No. 256 in Saskatchewan
- Coordinates: 51.140°N 107.470°W
- Country: Canada
- Province: Saskatchewan
- Census division: 7
- SARM division: 3
- Formed: December 11, 1911

Government
  - Reeve: Bonnie Simonson
  - Governing body: RM of King George No. 256 Council
  - Administrator: Krista James
  - Office location: Dinsmore

Area (2016)
  - Land: 831.97 km^{2} (321.23 sq mi)

Population (2016)
  - Total: 226
  - Density: 0.3/km^{2} (0.78/sq mi)
- Time zone: CST
  - Summer (DST): CST
- Area codes: 306 and 639

The Rural Municipality of King George No. 256 (2016 population: 226) is a rural municipality (RM) in the Canadian province of Saskatchewan within Census Division No. 7 and SARM Division No. 3.

== History ==
The RM of King George No. 256 incorporated as a rural municipality on December 11, 1911.

== Demographics ==
Population history (1981–2016)
Year	Pop.	±%
1981	365	—
1986	330	−9.6%
1991	309	−6.4%
1996	271	−12.3%
2001	244	−10.0%
2006	234	−4.1%
2011	217	−7.3%
2016	226	+4.1%
Source: Statistics Canada via Saskatchewan Bureau of Statistics

In the 2021 Census of Population conducted by Statistics Canada, the RM of King George No. 256 had a population of 178 living in 79 of its 94 total private dwellings, a change of −21.2% from its 2016 population of 226. With a land area of 820.32 km^{2} (316.73 sq mi), it had a population density of 0.2/km^{2} (0.6/sq mi) in 2021.

In the 2016 Census of Population, the RM of King George No. 256 recorded a population of 226 living in 85 of its 89 total private dwellings, a 4.1% change from its 2011 population of 217. With a land area of 831.97 km^{2} (321.23 sq mi), it had a population density of 0.3/km^{2} (0.7/sq mi) in 2016.

== Government ==
The RM of King George No. 256 is governed by an elected municipal council and an appointed administrator that meets on the second Tuesday of every month. The reeve of the RM is Bonnie Simonson while its administrator is Krista James. The RM's office is located in Dinsmore.

== Transportation ==
- Saskatchewan Highway 42
- Saskatchewan Highway 646
- Saskatchewan Highway 751

== See also ==
- List of rural municipalities in Saskatchewan
