= Rural Municipality of Maple Bush No. 224 =

Rural municipality in Saskatchewan, Canada

Maple Bush No. 224
- Rural municipality
- Rural Municipality of Maple Bush No. 224

- Location of the RM of Maple Bush No. 224 in Saskatchewan
- Coordinates: 50.981°N 106.772°W
- Country: Canada
- Province: Saskatchewan
- Census division: 7
- SARM division: 2
- Formed: December 13, 1909

Government
  - Reeve: Maurice Bartzen
  - Governing body: RM of Maple Bush No. 224 Council
  - Administrator: JoAnne 'Rene' Wandler
  - Office location: Riverhurst

Area (2016)
  - Land: 811.95 km^{2} (313.50 sq mi)

Population (2016)
  - Total: 192
  - Density: 0.2/km^{2} (0.52/sq mi)
- Time zone: CST
  - Summer (DST): CST
- Area codes: 306 and 639

The Rural Municipality of Maple Bush No. 224 (2016 population: 192) is a rural municipality (RM) in the Canadian province of Saskatchewan within Census Division No. 7 and SARM Division No. 2. It is located in the southwest portion of the province.

== History ==
The RM of Maple Bush No. 224 incorporated as a rural municipality on December 13, 1909.

== Geography ==
The RM is adjacent to Lake Diefenbaker and is home to Douglas Provincial Park.

=== Communities and localities ===
The following urban municipalities are surrounded by the RM.

Villages

- Riverhurst

Resort villages

- Mistusinne

The following unincorporated communities are within the RM.

Localities

- Gilroy
- Grainland
- Lawson, dissolved as a village, December 31, 1985

== Demographics ==
Population history (1981–2016)
Year	Pop.	±%
1981	239	—
1986	269	+12.6%
1991	223	−17.1%
1996	221	−0.9%
2001	208	−5.9%
2006	186	−10.6%
2011	167	−10.2%
2016	192	+15.0%
Source: Statistics Canada via Saskatchewan Bureau of Statistics

In the 2021 Census of Population conducted by Statistics Canada, the RM of Maple Bush No. 224 had a population of 213 living in 105 of its 188 total private dwellings, a change of 10.9% from its 2016 population of 192. With a land area of 818.05 km^{2} (315.85 sq mi), it had a population density of 0.3/km^{2} (0.7/sq mi) in 2021.

In the 2016 Census of Population, the RM of Maple Bush No. 224 recorded a population of 192 living in 82 of its 164 total private dwellings, a 15% change from its 2011 population of 167. With a land area of 811.95 km^{2} (313.50 sq mi), it had a population density of 0.2/km^{2} (0.6/sq mi) in 2016.

== Government ==
The RM of Maple Bush No. 224 is governed by an elected municipal council and an appointed administrator that meets on the second Wednesday of every month. The reeve of the RM is Maurice Bartzen while its administrator is JoAnne 'Rene' Wandler. The RM's office is located in Riverhurst.

== Attractions ==
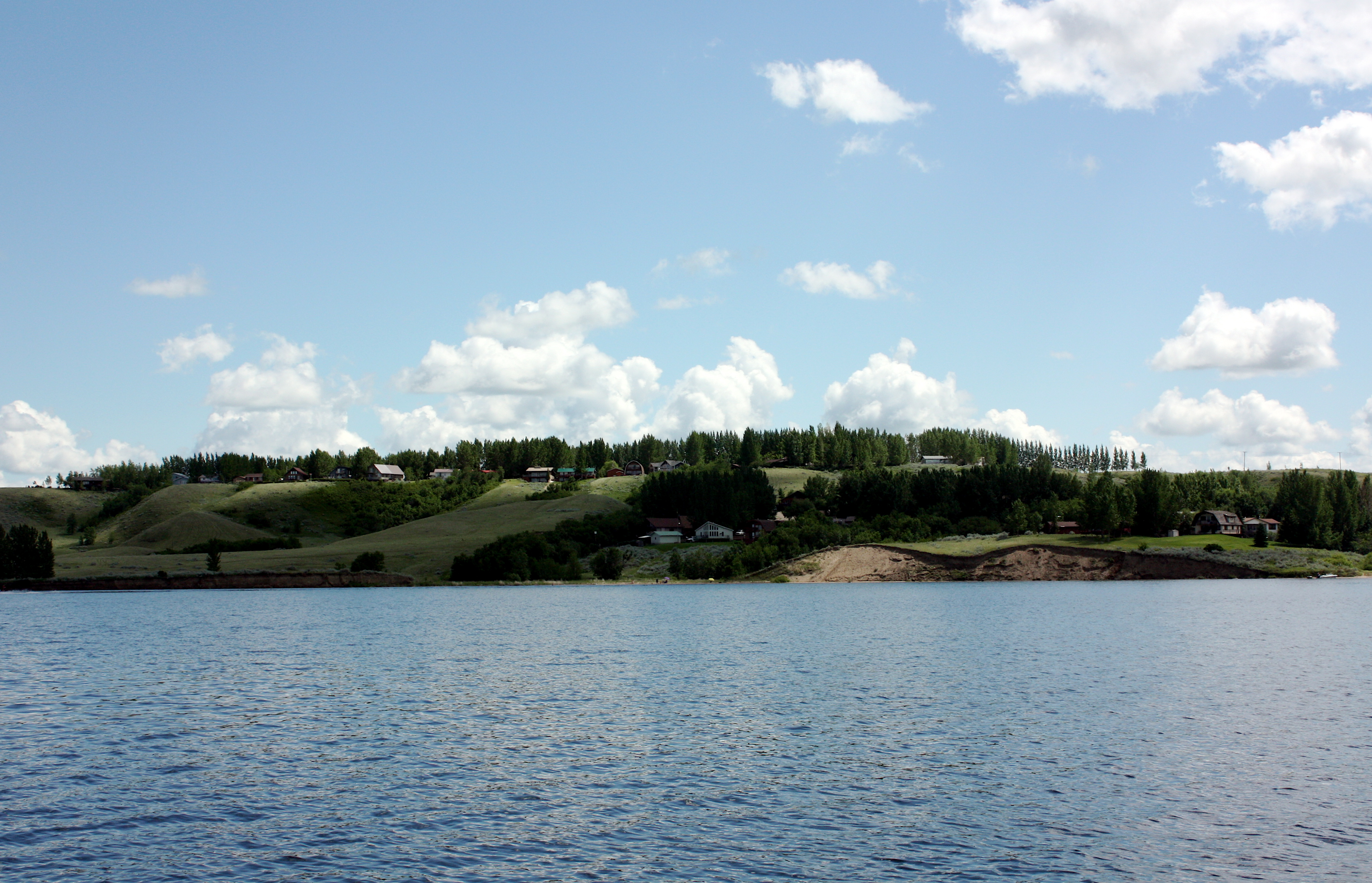
Palliser Regional Park cabins on Lake Diefenbaker

- Palliser Regional Park (50.8903°N 106.9423°W) is a regional park on Lake Diefenbaker, about 8 kilometres (5.0 mi) south-west of Riverhurst. It is named after John Palliser—namesake of the Palliser expedition—who reportedly camped in or near the park site in 1857. Amenities at the park include a campground, Sage View Golf Course, marina, picnic area, beach, pickleball courts, and a heated swimming pool. The park was founded in 1962. In 2024, it won Saskatchewan's Park of the Year Award.
- Sage View Golf Course is a 9-hole, grass greens course at Palliser Regional Park that was constructed in 1992. The golf course is par 36 with 2,998 yards with elevation changes through coulees. The golf course overlooks Lake Diefenbaker and has a licensed restaurant, banquet hall, pro shop, rentals, and a driving range.
- Douglas Provincial Park
- Elbow crater
- F.T. Hill Museum
- Qu'Appelle River Dam
- Riverhurst Ferry
