= Birsay, Saskatchewan =

Community in Saskatchewan, Canada

Coordinates: 51°06′N 106°59′W

Birsay is an unincorporated community in southern Saskatchewan, Canada. It is about 7 kilometres (4.3 mi) east of Luck Lake in the Rural Municipality of Coteau No. 255. Access is from Highway 45 and Highway 373.

== History ==
Prior to January 1, 2004, Birsay was a village, but it was restructured as a hamlet on that date.

== Demographics ==
In the 2021 Census of Population conducted by Statistics Canada, Birsay had a population of 40 living in 20 of its 35 total private dwellings, a change of -13% from its 2016 population of 46. With a land area of 0.78 km^{2} (0.30 sq mi), it had a population density of 51.3/km^{2} (132.8/sq mi) in 2021.
