= Central Butte =

Town in Saskatchewan, Canada

- Town
- Location of Central Butte in Saskatchewan Central Butte (Canada)
- Coordinates: 50.792°N 106.508°W
- Country: Canada
- Province: Saskatchewan
- Census division: No. 7
- Rural Municipality: No. 194
- Post office Founded: 1907

Government
  - Mayor: Grant Berger
  - Administrator: Kyle Van Den Bosch
  - Governing body: Central Butte Town Council

Area
  - Total: 2.24 km^{2} (0.86 sq mi)

Population (2021)
  - Total: 416
  - Density: 166.3/km^{2} (431/sq mi)
- Time zone: CST
- Postal code: S0H 0T0
- Area code: 306
- Highways: Highway 19; Highway 42
- Website: Central Butte, Saskatchewan

Central Butte is a town in Saskatchewan, Canada, approximately 200 kilometres (120 mi) from Saskatoon, Regina and Swift Current and 100 kilometres (62 mi) from Moose Jaw. Thunder Creek, a major tributary of the Moose Jaw River, begins west of the community. The town is served by the Central Butte Airport (TC LID: CJC4).

== History ==
The first settlers arrived to farm in the Central Butte area in 1905, the same year Saskatchewan became a province. In 1906 a store and post office were established. A railway from Moose Jaw made it to the Central Butte area at the end of 1914, meaning the 48-mile-long (77 km) trips to Craik for supplies were no longer necessary. After the railway arrived, a permanent township was chosen and businesses moved in to the area.

== Demographics ==
In the 2021 Census of Population conducted by Statistics Canada, Central Butte had a population of 416 living in 190 of its 216 total private dwellings, a change of 11.8% from its 2016 population of 372. With a land area of 2.1 km^{2} (0.81 sq mi), it had a population density of 198.1/km^{2} (513.1/sq mi) in 2021.

== Recreation and clubs ==
- 4-H
- Kin Canada
- Lions Club
- Royal Canadian Legion
- Butte Junction Dance
- Curling
- Figure skating
- Karate
- Minor ball
- Minor hockey
- Seniors activities
- Senior hockey
- Volleyball

== Notable people ==
- James Alcock - professor of psychology, author
- Ron Atchison - Saskatchewan Roughriders defensive lineman
- Blair Jones - professional hockey player
- R. Harlan Smith - country singer
- Clarke Wilm - professional hockey player

== See also ==
- List of communities in Saskatchewan
- List of towns in Saskatchewan
