= Demaine, Saskatchewan =

Community in Saskatchewan, Canada

Demaine
- Hamlet
- Location in Saskatchewan Demaine (Canada)
- Coordinates: 50°53′29″N 107°15′37″W
- Country: Canada
- Province: Saskatchewan
- Rural municipality: Victory No. 226
- Settled: July 1908

Government
  - Mayor: Wyatt Rogness

Population (2006)
  - Total: ~23
- Estimated as exact census data is not taken.
- Time zone: UTC-6 (CST)
- Postal Code: S0L 0R0
- Area code: 306

Demaine is a hamlet in the southwest Coteau Hills region of Saskatchewan, Canada.

== History ==
Demaine was named after Frank Demaine who settled in the region in the early 1900s with several other families.

== Geography ==
Demaine is in the Rural Municipality of Victory No. 226. It is located along Highway 737.

== Demographics ==
In the 2021 Census of Population conducted by Statistics Canada, Demaine had a population of 20 living in 13 of its 17 total private dwellings, a change of −20% from its 2016 population of 25. With a land area of 0.29 km^{2} (0.11 sq mi), it had a population density of 69.0/km^{2} (178.6/sq mi) in 2021.

== See also ==
- List of communities in Saskatchewan
