= Lucky Lake =

Village in Saskatchewan, Canada

- Village
- Village of Lucky Lake
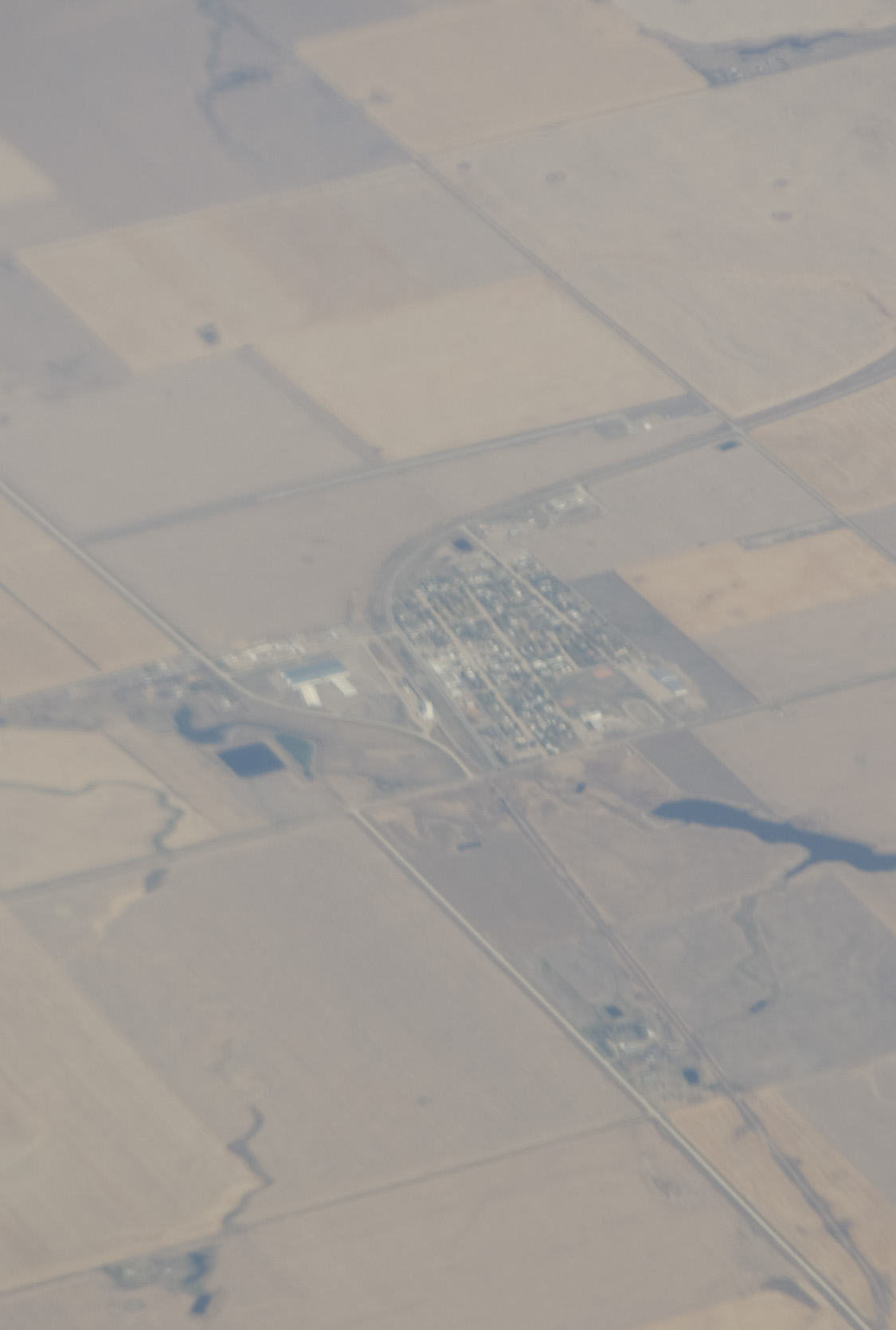
- Aerial view of Lucky Lake

- Location of Lucky Lake in Saskatchewan Lucky Lake (Canada)
- Coordinates: 50.998°N 107.150°W
- Country: Canada
- Province: Saskatchewan
- Region: Southwest
- Census division: 7
- Rural municipality: Canaan No. 225
- Post office Founded: March 28, 1908
- Incorporated (Village): November 23, 1920

Government
  - Type: Municipal
  - Governing body: Lucky Lake Village Council
  - Administrator: Melanie Dyck

Area
  - Land: 0.66 km^{2} (0.25 sq mi)

Population (2016)
  - Total: 289
  - Density: 438.7/km^{2} (1,136/sq mi)
- Time zone: UTC-6 (CST)
- Postal code: S0L 1Z0
- Area code: 306
- Highways: Highway 42; Highway 45 Highway 646
- Railway: Canadian National Railway

Lucky Lake (2016 population: 289) is a village in the Canadian province of Saskatchewan within the Rural Municipality of Canaan No. 225 and Census Division No. 7. The village is at the junction of Highway 42, Highway 45, and Highway 646 approximately 90 kilometres (56 mi) northeast of Swift Current.

== History ==
Lucky Lake incorporated as a village on November 23, 1920.

== Demographics ==
Population history (1981–2016)
Year	Pop.	±%
1981	333	—
1986	382	+14.7%
1991	341	−10.7%
1996	353	+3.5%
2001	354	+0.3%
2006	295	−16.7%
2011	287	−2.7%
2016	289	+0.7%
Source: Statistics Canada via Saskatchewan Bureau of Statistics

In the 2021 Census of Population conducted by Statistics Canada, Lucky Lake had a population of 270 living in 127 of its 145 total private dwellings, a change of −6.6% from its 2016 population of 289. With a land area of 0.82 km^{2} (0.32 sq mi), it had a population density of 329.3/km^{2} (852.8/sq mi) in 2021.

In the 2016 Census of Population, the Village of Lucky Lake recorded a population of 289 living in 134 of its 154 total private dwellings, a 0.7% change from its 2011 population of 287. With a land area of 0.66 km^{2} (0.25 sq mi), it had a population density of 437.9/km^{2} (1,134.1/sq mi) in 2016.

== Economy ==
Agriculture and agriculture services constitute the largest component of the town's economy. Typical crops grown in the area include durum wheat, spring wheat, peas, lentils, and canola. Flax, beans and mustard are also grown to a lesser extent. Nearby Lake Diefenbaker provides water for irrigation so that additional crops such as potatoes can be grown. Wild West Steelhead, is an aquaculture farm that raises Steelhead Trout in the lake. The company employs many people in its operations that comprise the steps of egg incubation to the production of finished fillets.

In the past, the provincial government's efforts (via a partnership known as SPUDCO) to create a potato growing industry in the province led to local jobs being created to grow and package potatoes. SPUDCO eventually failed and the local potato growing industry has been slow to recover.

== Attractions ==
- Palliser Regional Park
- Riverhurst Ferry
- Luck Lake

== See also ==
- List of communities in Saskatchewan
- List of francophone communities in Saskatchewan
- List of villages in Saskatchewan
- Lucky Lake Airport
