= Riverhurst =

Village in Saskatchewan, Canada

- Village
- Location within Saskatchewan Location within Canada
- Coordinates: 50.5500°N 106.5100°W
- Country: Canada
- Province: Saskatchewan
- Region: Southwest
- Census division: 7
- Rural Municipality: Maple Bush

Government
  - Governing body: Riverhurst Village Council

Area
  - Total: 124.8 km^{2} (48.2 sq mi)

Population (2016)
  - Total: 130
  - Density: 0.91/km^{2} (2.4/sq mi)
- Time zone: CST
- Area code: 306
- Highways: Highway 42
- Website: Village of Riverhurst

Riverhurst (2021 population: 152) is a village in the Canadian province of Saskatchewan within the Rural Municipality of Maple Bush No. 224 and Census Division No. 7. It is in the southwest Coteau Hills area of the province, north of the Vermillion Hills. The community is located on Highway 42 east of Riverhurst Ferry. The village is primarily a farming community.

The name is a portmanteau of Riverside and Boldenhurst, two nearby post offices.

== History ==
Riverhurst incorporated as a village on June 22, 1916.

== Demographics ==
Population history (1981–2016)
Year	Pop.	±%
1981	193	—
1986	180	−6.7%
1991	174	−3.3%
1996	158	−9.2%
2001	143	−9.5%
2006	121	−15.4%
2011	114	−5.8%
2016	130	+14.0%
Source: Statistics Canada via Saskatchewan Bureau of Statistics

In the 2021 Census of Population conducted by Statistics Canada, Riverhurst had a population of 152 living in 74 of its 131 total private dwellings, a change of 16.9% from its 2016 population of 130. With a land area of 1.01 km^{2} (0.39 sq mi), it had a population density of 150.5/km^{2} (389.8/sq mi) in 2021.

In the 2016 Census of Population, the Village of Riverhurst recorded a population of 130 living in 69 of its 114 total private dwellings, a 12.3% change from its 2011 population of 114. With a land area of 0.91 km^{2} (0.35 sq mi), it had a population density of 142.9/km^{2} (370.0/sq mi) in 2016.

== Infrastructure ==
Riverhurst is situated close to the east bank of Lake Diefenbaker, and is the location of the Riverhurst Ferry, a cable ferry that crosses to Lucky Lake on the west bank. Highway 42 (which provides access to the community) crosses Lake Diefenbaker by the Riverhurst Ferry. The village is located 8 km south of the Elbow crater.

== Notable residents ==
- Royal Canadian Mounted Police Constable Thomas Brian King (who was shot to death in Saskatoon) lived in Riverhurst.

== See also ==
- List of villages in Saskatchewan
- List of francophone communities in Saskatchewan
- List of communities in Saskatchewan
- List of geographic names derived from portmanteaus
