= Riverhurst Ferry =

Cable ferry in Saskatchewan, Canada

Coordinates: 50.910827°N 106.930618°W

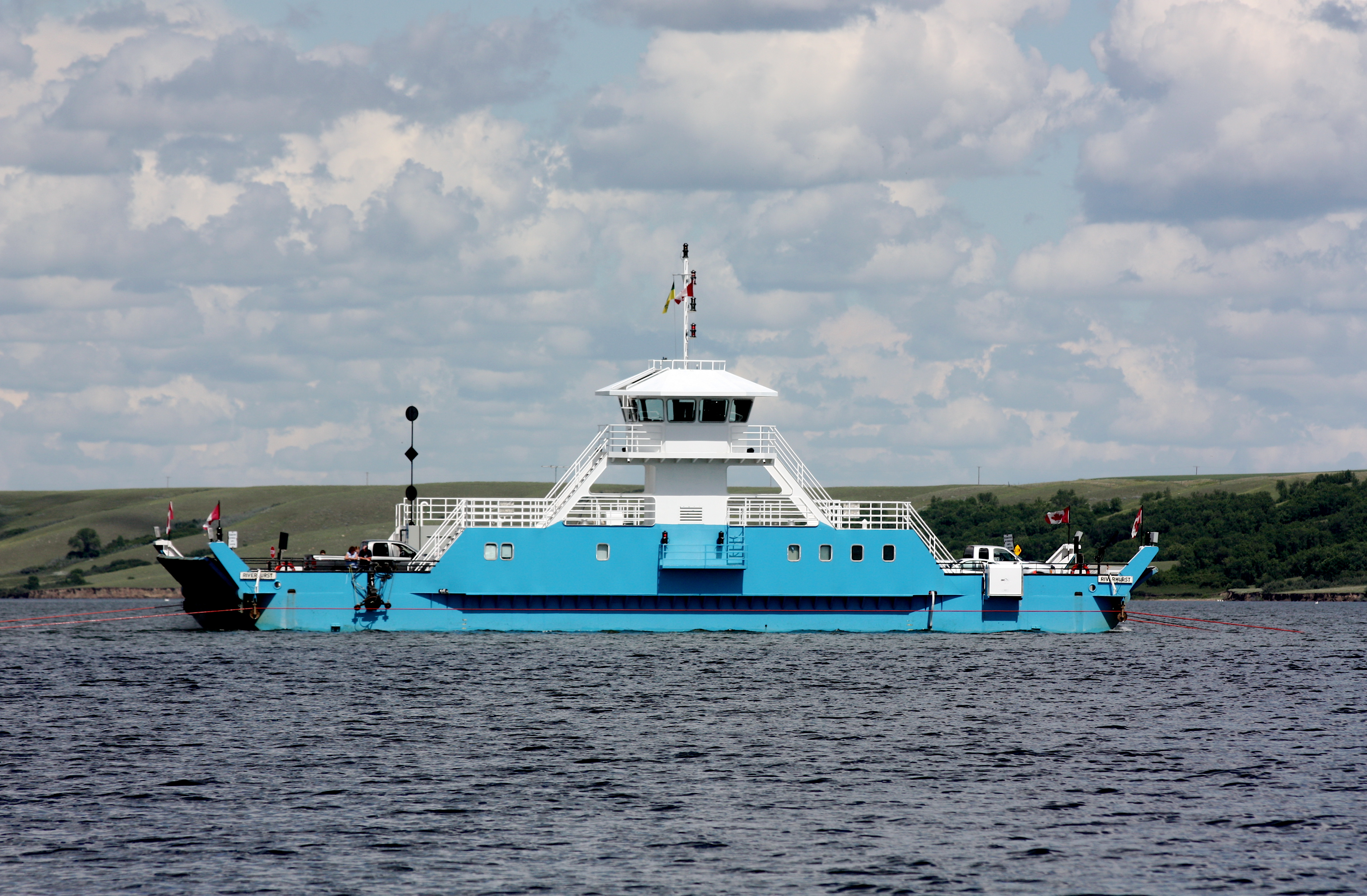
The Riverhurst Ferry

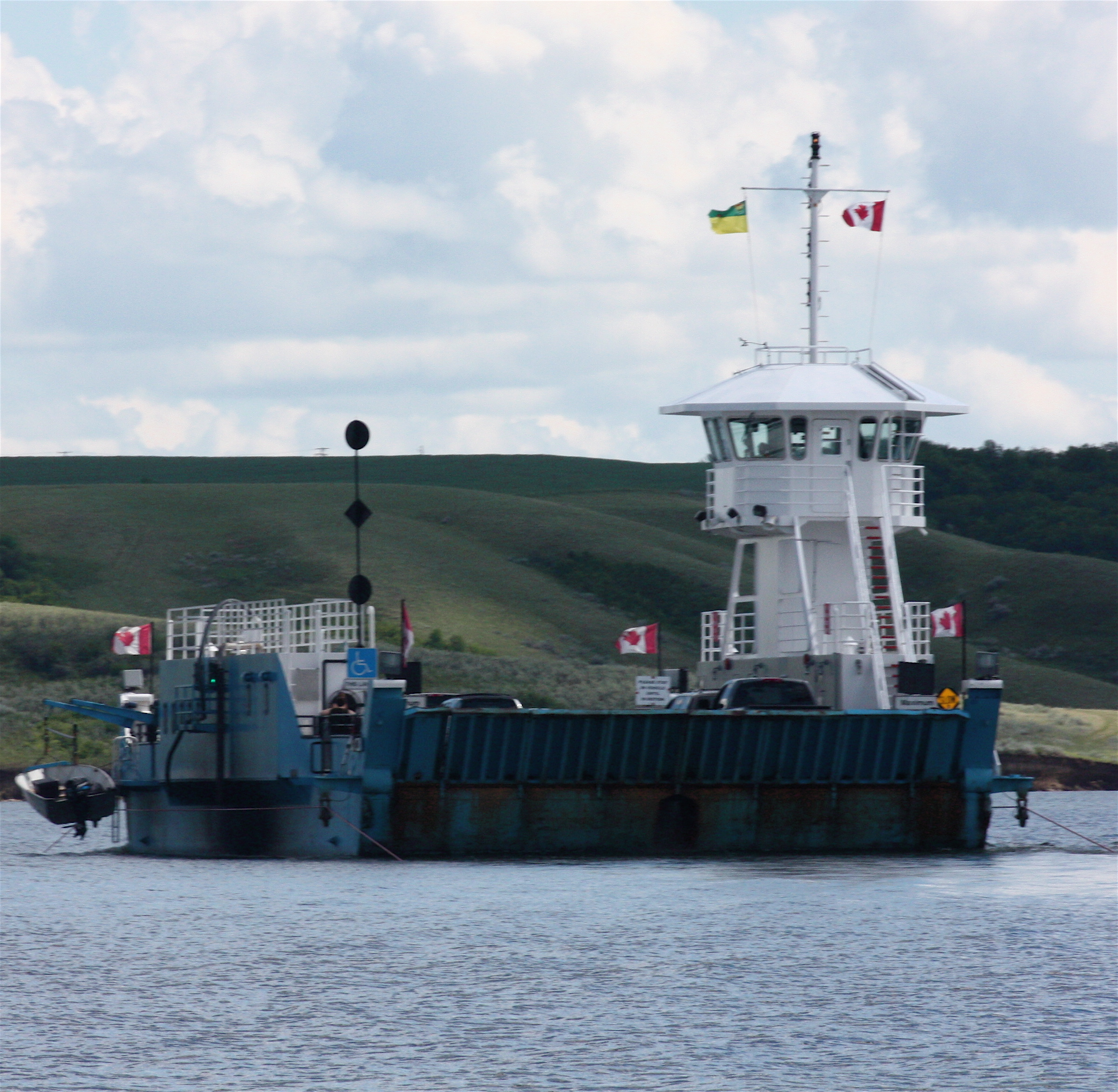
Riverhurst Ferry showing far left and right guide cables and central guide cable

The Riverhurst Ferry is a cable ferry in the Canadian province of Saskatchewan. The ferry carries Highway 42 across Lake Diefenbaker, linking Riverhurst on the east bank to Lucky Lake on the west bank.

The ferry is operated by the Saskatchewan Ministry of Highways and Infrastructure, and travels a distance of some 1.5 kilometres (0.93 mi). The ferry is free of tolls and operates 24 hours a day. During daylight hours, there is an hourly crossing departing from the east bank on the hour and the west bank on the half-hour. At night, the ferry operates on demand.

The ferry operates only during the ice-free season; during the winter months, the provincial government lays out and maintains an ice road across the lake.

The Riverhurst Ferry is Saskatchewan's largest ferry, with a length of 35.6 metres (117 ft), a width of 14 metres (46 ft), and a load limit 90.7 tonnes (89.3 long tons; 100.0 short tons). It carries a maximum off fifteen cars on each crossing. It is powered by a computer-controlled engine and powers a central drive cable. There are three guide cables, two mounted one foot from the left and right sides, and a middle cable running underneath the hull.

In 2003, the Riverhurst Ferry was renovated, with additions of a new drive system, control tower and passenger areas, including restrooms and a small lounge. After the renovations, the ferry was plagued with technical difficulties involving the drive system. The ferry frequently broke down and as a result was unreliable for years after. Presently, the ferry is operating normally.

The ferry carries about 30,000 vehicles a year.

== See also ==
- List of crossings of the South Saskatchewan River
