= Hawarden, Saskatchewan =

Village in Saskatchewan, Canada

Hawarden
- Village
- Village of Hawarden
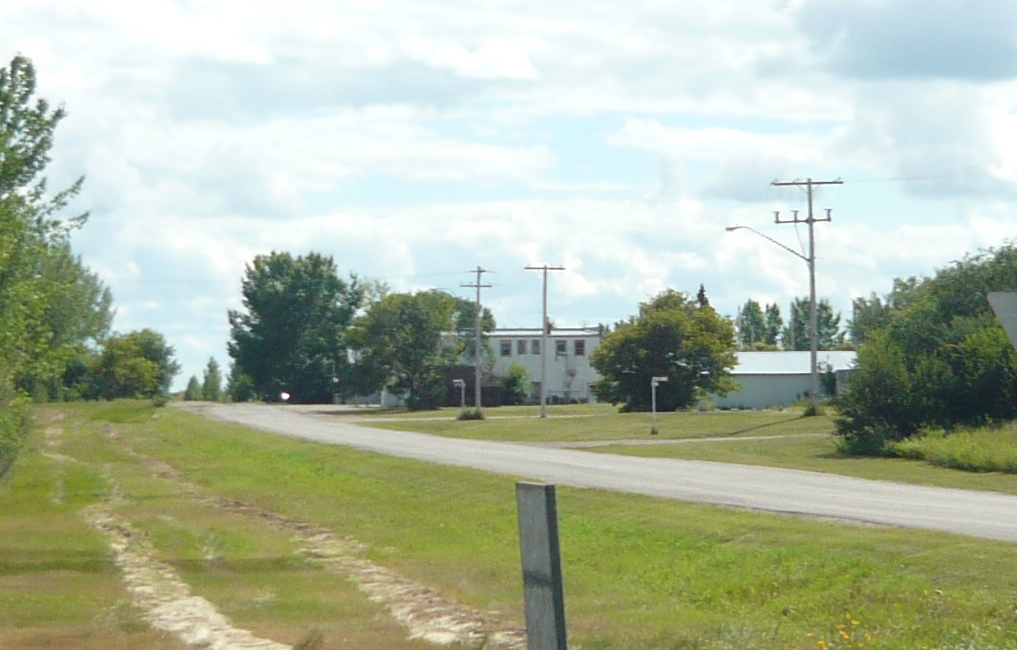
- Railway Avenue in Hawarden

- Location of Hawarden in Saskatchewan Hawarden (Canada)
- Coordinates: 51.407°N 106.581°W
- Country: Canada
- Province: Saskatchewan
- Region: Central
- Census division: 11
- Rural Municipality: Loreburn No. 254
- Incorporated (Village): 1909

Government
  - Type: Municipal
  - Governing body: Hawarden Village Council
  - Mayor: Dale Blenkinsop
  - Administrator: Kelly Dodd

Area
  - Total: 1.24 km^{2} (0.48 sq mi)

Population (2016)
  - Total: 52
  - Density: 41.9/km^{2} (109/sq mi)
- Time zone: UTC-6 (CST)
- Postal code: S0H 1Y0
- Area code: 306
- Highways: Highway 19

Hawarden (2016 population: 52) is a village in the Canadian province of Saskatchewan within the Rural Municipality of Loreburn No. 254 and Census Division No. 11. The village is located on Highway 19 north of Strongfield, Loreburn, and Elbow.

Hawarden was named after Hawarden Castle in Flintshire, Wales, the country home of British politician and four-time prime minister William Gladstone.

The village contains a post office, the Hawarden Hall, a playground and a bar. Throughout the years, it has contained an elementary school, Perry Industries, indoor skating rink, bank, gas pumps, arcade, two churches, two convenience stores, surplus store, four grain elevators, and a café.

== History ==
Hawarden incorporated as a village on July 16, 1909.

Canadian Bank of Commerce was opened 1909 but burned down on December 12, 1911, along with much of Gladstone Street during a fire. A new Canadian Bank of Commerce was built in 1922 and is one of only two known existing buildings with the same architectural type in Saskatchewan.

== Demographics ==
Population history (1981–2016)
Year	Pop.	±%
1981	137	—
1986	112	−18.2%
1991	102	−8.9%
1996	81	−20.6%
2001	57	−29.6%
2006	75	+31.6%
2011	50	−33.3%
2016	52	+4.0%
Source: Statistics Canada via Saskatchewan Bureau of Statistics

In the 2021 Census of Population conducted by Statistics Canada, Hawarden had a population of 50 living in 30 of its 33 total private dwellings, a change of −3.8% from its 2016 population of 52. With a land area of 1.12 km^{2} (0.43 sq mi), it had a population density of 44.6/km^{2} (115.6/sq mi) in 2021.

In the 2016 Census of Population, the Village of Hawarden recorded a population of 52 living in 33 of its 36 total private dwellings, a 3.8% change from its 2011 population of 50. With a land area of 1.24 km^{2} (0.48 sq mi), it had a population density of 41.9/km^{2} (108.6/sq mi) in 2016.

== Events ==
Beginning in 2001, the Hawarden Winter Warriors have hosted the Annual Hawarden Vintage Snowmobile Rally. The rally includes a 97-kilometre (60 mi) long trail for new snowmobiles and a 32-kilometre (20 mi) long trail for vintage snowmobile. The event starts at the Hawarden Hall, and has included many vintage snowmobiles, snow planes, great prizes and raffles.

Also beginning in 2001 was Bert's Boxing Day Classic, a rec hockey tournament in memory of Brendan Ringdal. The annual tournament was held in Hawarden until 2010, when it was moved to Kenaston due to the closure of the Hawarden rink.

Hawarden's 100th Anniversary Celebration was held in 1999, with a parade, performances by local talent and fireworks.

== See also ==
- List of communities in Saskatchewan
- List of villages of Saskatchewan
