= Saskatchewan Highway 19 =

Provincial highway in Saskatchewan, Canada

Highway 19
- Highway 19 highlighted in red
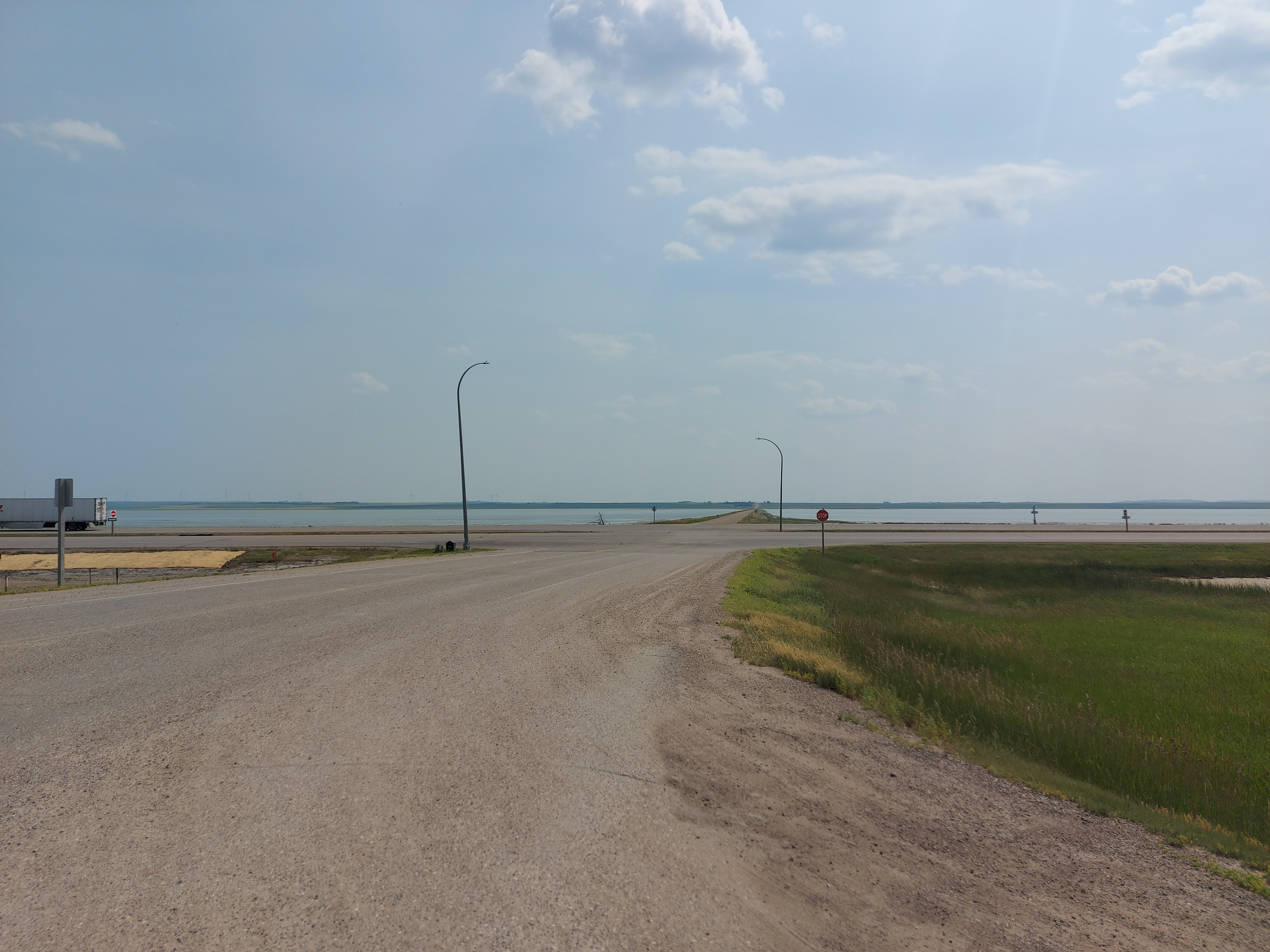
- Highway 19's intersection with Highways 1 and 58. Chaplin Lake is in the background

Route information
- Maintained by Ministry of Highways and Infrastructure
- Length: 269.3 km (167.3 mi)

Major junctions
- South end: Highway 18 near Mankota
- Highway 13 at Kincaid; Highway 43 near Glenbain; Highway 1 (TCH) near Ernfold and Chaplin; Highway 42 at Central Butte; Highway 44 near Loreburn
- North end: Highway 15 near Hawarden

Location
- Country: Canada
- Province: Saskatchewan
- Rural municipalities: Mankota, Pinto Creek, Glen Bain, Lawtonia, Morse, Chaplin, Enfield, Maple Bush, Huron, Loreburn, Rosedale
- Towns: Elbow, Central Butte

Highway system
- Provincial highways in Saskatchewan
← Highway 18	→ Highway 20

Saskatchewan Highway 19 is a provincial highway in the Canadian province of Saskatchewan. The highway runs from Highway 15 near Hawarden south to Highway 18 east of Mankota and provides access to several communities, lakes, beaches, historical sites and buildings, and parks. It is about 269 kilometres (167 mi) long.

Highway 19 was a case study for the Saskatchewan Centre for Excellence in Transportation and Infrastructure (SCETI). SCETI was working on further defining the SHELL curves for the low-lying Sub base sections. Due to the high clay content and the poor application of the culvert systems in the area, this case study will be able to address the issues currently ailing the road. The study concluded in the fall on 2012.

Between 2017 and 2021 numerous repairs have been made between Highway 15 to Elbow. This section sees the most road erosion due to seasonal weather changes. With better maintenance efforts in 2019–2020, safe travel has been greatly improved for motorists.

== History ==
A 9.2-kilometre (5.7 mi) long paving project on Highway 19 north of Chaplin was announced June 8, 1999. A 9.7-kilometre (6.0 mi) long resurfacing project started July 7, 2000 at the junction of Highway 15 and continued south. This area is west of Kenaston and will assist tourism traffic to Lake Diefenbaker resorts. The 19.3-kilometre (12.0 mi) long section south of the Highway 15 junction to Strongfield was used for a test section to develop a framework for highway management. This area has an increase in truck traffic from the potato industry, as well as increase in grain hauling to the Loreburn inland grain terminal. Average annual daily traffic AADT was 500 vehicles, of these 11% is due to commercial ventures. Besides economic interests, recreational sites are in the area. Construction issues on Highway 19 involve a silty to heavy clay soil type in a rural area with a traffic load of full loaded trucks and semi trailers. About 8,000 kilometres (5,000 mi) of road in Saskatchewan experienced rutting and pavement failure prior to 2003. Twenty-seven highway improvement projects include granular spot improvements north of Chaplin for 9.2 kilometres (5.7 mi) on Highway 19. Experimental strengthening techniques were undertaken, which used a rotomix of the existing asphalt oil surface and mulched flax straw. This procedure underwent a series of tests examining whether an increase of the subgrade tensile strength occurred. This experiment was undertaken 100 kilometres (62 mi) south of Saskatoon for three test sections of provincial Highway 19 near Strongfield. Since 1999, Highway 19 has had a thin membrane surface (TMS) which has been subject to test studies of various cost-effective methods

cost-effective methods of road strengthening. Systems include granular soil strengthening and applications of different cement products, lime, various grades of fly ash, geotextiles, geogrids, natural and manufactured fibers, emulsified bitumen, tall oil, lignin, foamed bitumen, and synthetic ionic and cationic chemicals.

== Route description ==
The southern terminus of Highway 19 begins at Highway 18 between the communities of Mankota and Ferland. The highway heads north from there towards Highway 13 and Kincaid. After a short 1.1-kilometre (0.68 mi) eastward concurrency with 13, Highway 19 resumes its northerly travel en route to Highway 1 — the Trans-Canada Highway. Communities along this stretch include Glenbain and Hodgeville. Flowing Well Manor, an historic site of Canada, is along the highway about 16 kilometres (9.9 mi) north of Hodgeville. Highway concurrencies along this section include a 3.2-kilometre (2 mi) long one with 43 and a 500-metre (1,600 ft) long one with 363.

From Highway 1, the two highways begin a 27-kilometre (17 mi) eastward concurrency towards Chaplin and Chaplin Lake. Chaplin Lake, at an area of 52 square kilometres (20 sq mi), is the second largest saline lake in Canada. The Western Hemisphere Shorebird Interpretive Centre or the Chaplin Nature Centre is located on Chaplin Lake. In 1947, the Saskatchewan Minerals, the Sodium Sulfate plant opened at Chaplin to mine the abundant salt at the lake. At Chaplin, Highway 19 resumes its northerly routing and heads towards Thunder Creek where it begins a north-easterly heading for several kilometres. It then returns to its northerly routing and heads to Central Butte and Highway 42.

Highway 19 has a 6.5-kilometre (4.0 mi) eastward concurrency with 42 before turning north towards Lake Diefenbaker. Lake Diefenbaker is a man-made lake along the South Saskatchewan River impounded by two dams — Gardiner Dam and Qu'Appelle River Dam. Highway 19, as it approaches the lake, drops into the Qu'Appelle Valley and runs near the base of the Qu'Appelle River Dam where it crosses the Qu'Appelle River. After crossing the river, the highway climbs out of the valley and enters Douglas Provincial Park. It then travels north-west through the park paralleling the eastern shore of Lake Diefenbaker (Gordon McKenzie Arm) and providing access to the park's amenities. As the highway leaves the park, it provides access to Mistusinne while continuing to parallel the lake en route to Elbow. After Elbow, the highway resumes its northerly routing and continues northward to its northern terminus at Highway 15. Communities along the stretch include Loreburn, Strongfield, and Hawarden.

== Major intersections ==
From south to north:

Rural municipality	Location	km	mi	Destinations	Notes
Mankota No. 45		0.0	0.0	Highway 18 – Mankota, Val Marie, McCord, Wood Mountain	Northwest of Mankota
Pinto Creek No. 75		26.2	16.3	Highway 13 west (Red Coat Trail) – Cadillac, Shaunavon	South end of Highway 13 concurrency
Pinto Creek No. 75	Kincaid	27.4	17.0	Highway 13 east (Red Coat Trail) – Assiniboia	North end of Highway 13 concurrency
Glen Bain No. 105	Glenbain	46.4	28.8	Township Road 104	
Glen Bain No. 105		52.2	32.4	Highway 43 east – Gravelbourg	South end of Highway 43 concurrency
Glen Bain No. 105		55.4	34.4	Highway 43 west – Vanguard	North end of Highway 43 concurrency
Lawtonia No. 135	Hodgeville	78.0	48.5	Highway 363 west – Swift Current	South end of Highway 363 concurrency
Lawtonia No. 135	Hodgeville	78.4	48.7	Highway 363 east – Moose Jaw	North end of Highway 363 concurrency
Lawtonia No. 135		91.0	56.5	Highway 720 west	
Morse No. 165		112.2	69.7	Highway 1 (TCH) west – Swift Current	South end of Highway 1 concurrency
Morse No. 165	Ernfold	118.2	73.4	Range Road 3073	Ernfold is located between eastbound and westbound lanes.
Chaplin No. 164	Uren	127.9	79.5	Range Road 3063	
Chaplin No. 164	Chaplin	136.8	85.0	Highway 58 south – Gravelbourg Highway 1 (TCH) east – Moose Jaw, Regina	North end of Highway 1 concurrency
Enfield No. 194	Central Butte	180.1	111.9	Highway 42 west – Riverhurst, Lucky Lake	South end of Highway 42 concurrency
Enfield No. 194		186.6	115.9	Highway 42 east – Eyebrow, Moose Jaw	North end of Highway 42 concurrency
Maple Bush No. 224 / Huron No. 223 boundary	Bridgeford	201.5	125.2	Highway 367 east – Eyebrow	
Loreburn No. 254	Elbow	227.2	141.2	Highway 749 east – Girvin	
Loreburn No. 254	Loreburn	240.2	149.3	Highway 44 – Gardiner Dam, Davidson	
Loreburn No. 254	Strongfield	249.9	155.3	Township Road 274	
Loreburn No. 254	Hawarden	259.6	161.3	Township Road 284	
Rosedale No. 283		269.3	167.3	Highway 15 – Outlook, Kenaston	
1.000 mi = 1.609 km; 1.000 km = 0.621 mi: Concurrency terminus

== See also ==
- Roads in Saskatchewan
- Transportation in Saskatchewan
