= Loreburn, Saskatchewan =

Village in Saskatchewan, Canada

Loreburn
- Village
- Village of Loreburn
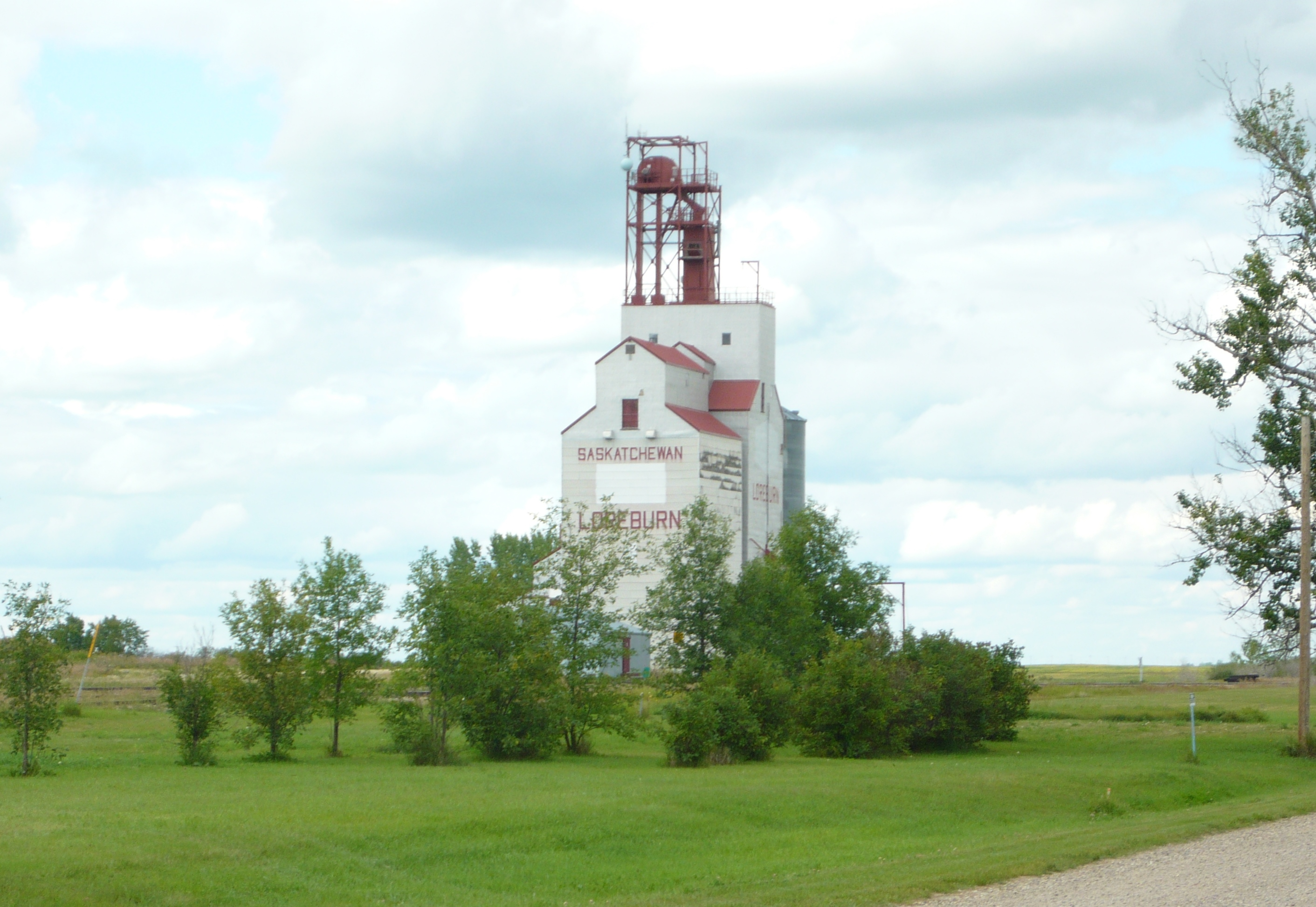
- Grain elevator along the railway in Loreburn

- Location within Saskatchewan Location within Canada
- Coordinates: 51°13′51″N 106°35′59″W
- Country: Canada
- Province: Saskatchewan
- Region: Central
- Census division: 11
- Rural Municipality: Loreburn
- Post office founded: 1908-11-21
- Incorporated (village): 1909

Government
  - Type: Municipal
  - Governing body: Loreburn Village Council
  - Mayor: Lawrence Casey
  - Administrator: Brandy Losie (2013-present)

Area
  - Total: 0.62 km^{2} (0.24 sq mi)

Population (2016)
  - Total: 113
  - Density: 231.4/km^{2} (599/sq mi)
- Time zone: UTC-6 (CST)
- Postal code: S0H 2S0
- Area code: 306
- Highways: Highway 19; Highway 44
- Railways: Canadian Pacific Railway

Loreburn (2016 population: 107) is a village in the Canadian province of Saskatchewan within the Rural Municipality of Loreburn No. 254 and Census Division No. 11. The village is about 16 kilometres (9.9 mi) north of Elbow and 16 kilometres (9.9 mi) south-east of Danielson Provincial Park, which is located near Gardiner Dam, Lake Diefenbaker.

== History ==
Loreburn incorporated as a village on May 20, 1909.

The hardcover book by the title of, "From Mouldboard to Metric" is a history of the Village of Loreburn published in 1978.

== Demographics ==
Population history (1981–2016)
Year	Pop.	±%
1981	201	—
1986	179	−10.9%
1991	170	−5.0%
1996	150	−11.8%
2001	143	−4.7%
2006	113	−21.0%
2011	107	−5.3%
2016	107	+0.0%
Source: Statistics Canada via Saskatchewan Bureau of Statistics

In the 2021 Census of Population conducted by Statistics Canada, Loreburn had a population of 100 living in 52 of its 65 total private dwellings, a change of −6.5% from its 2016 population of 107. With a land area of 0.56 km^{2} (0.22 sq mi), it had a population density of 178.6/km^{2} (462.5/sq mi) in 2021.

In the 2016 Census of Population, the Village of Loreburn recorded a population of 107 living in 53 of its 55 total private dwellings, a 0% change from its 2011 population of 107. With a land area of 0.62 km^{2} (0.24 sq mi), it had a population density of 172.6/km^{2} (447.0/sq mi) in 2016.

== Sports and recreation ==
Loreburn is home of The 19ers Hockey Club, a Senior Hockey team that competes in the Sask Valley Hockey League (SVHL). They won championships in 1998 & 2000 and most recently in 2026. The 19ers play out of the Loreburn Arena.

== Amenities ==
Loreburn has an RV Campground (established 2019) that features 12 sites, is fully serviced (power, water and sewer hookup), and has a new washroom facility with two fully wheelchair accessible bathrooms/showers.

A gas station, credit union, Canada Post office, and an insurance broker are within the village, along with a few other small to mid-size businesses. The RM of Loreburn No.254 office and (new as of 2021) depot is located at the east side entrance of the village.

== See also ==
- List of communities in Saskatchewan
- List of villages in Saskatchewan
