= Rural Municipality of Rosedale No. 283 =

Rural municipality in Saskatchewan, Canada

Rosedale No. 283
- Rural municipality
- Rural Municipality of Rosedale No. 283
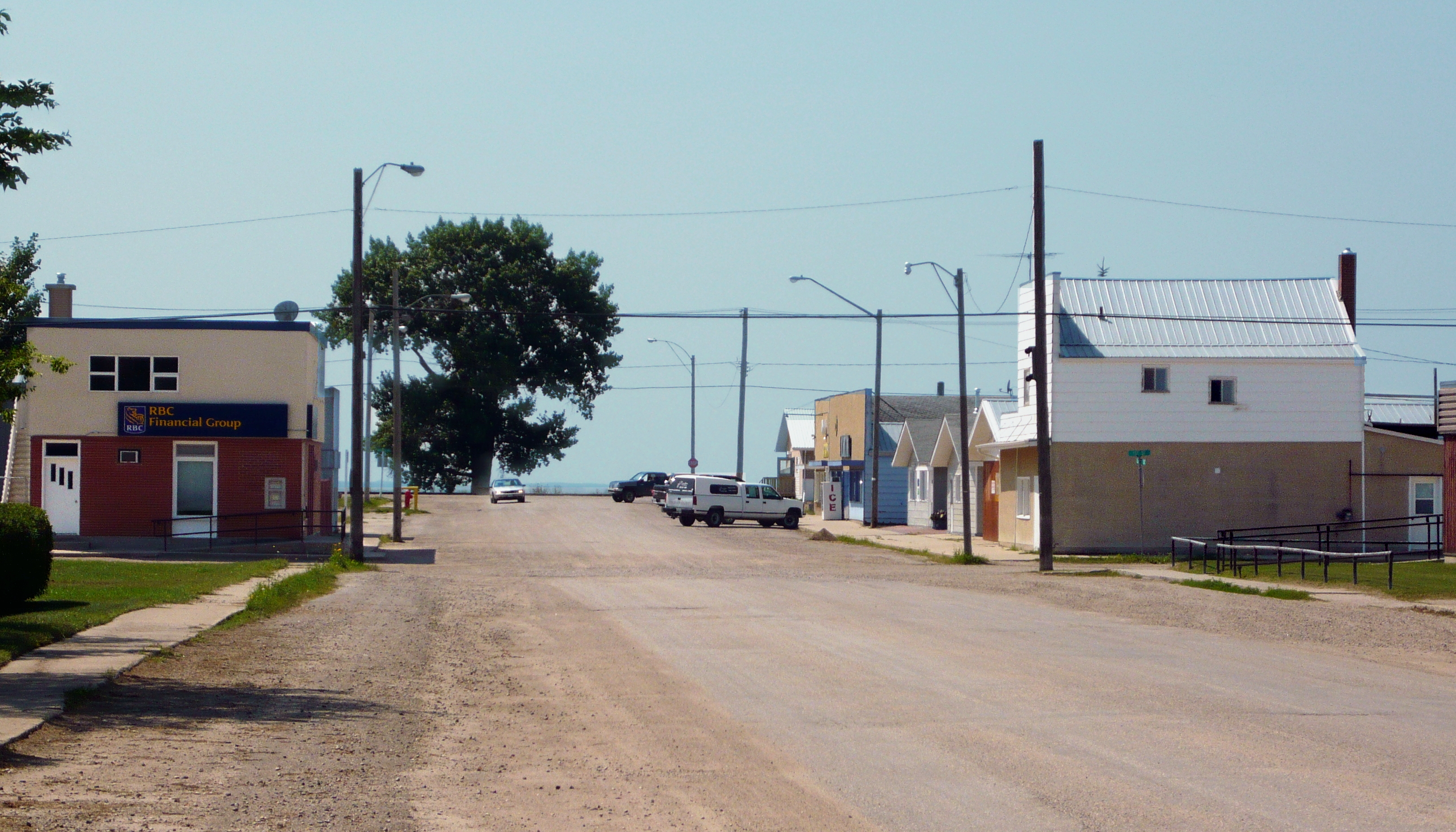
- Downtown Hanley

- Location of the RM of Rosedale No. 283 in Saskatchewan
- Coordinates: 51.572°N 106.471°W
- Country: Canada
- Province: Saskatchewan
- Census division: 11
- SARM division: 5
- Formed: December 13, 1909

Government
  - Reeve: Kevin Ouellette
  - Governing body: RM of Rosedale No. 283 Council
  - Administrator: Danielle Hache
  - Office location: Hanley

Area (2016)
  - Land: 921.51 km^{2} (355.80 sq mi)

Population (2016)
  - Total: 526
  - Density: 0.6/km^{2} (1.6/sq mi)
- Time zone: CST
  - Summer (DST): CST
- Area codes: 306 and 639

The Rural Municipality of Rosedale No. 283 (2016 population: 526) is a rural municipality (RM) in the Canadian province of Saskatchewan within Census Division No. 11 and SARM Division No. 5. It is located in the central portion of the province along Highway 11 between Saskatoon and Regina.

== History ==
The RM of Rosedale No. 283 incorporated as a rural municipality on December 13, 1909. It was formed through the amalgamation of Local Improvement District (LID) 15-B-3 and LID 15-C-3.

== Geography ==
=== Communities and localities ===
The following urban municipalities are surrounded by the RM.

Towns

- Hanley

The following unincorporated communities are within the RM.

Localities

- Jays

== Demographics ==
Population history (1981–2016)
Year	Pop.	±%
1981	528	—
1986	557	+5.5%
1991	524	−5.9%
1996	520	−0.8%
2001	493	−5.2%
2006	455	−7.7%
2011	515	+13.2%
2016	526	+2.1%
Source: Statistics Canada via Saskatchewan Bureau of Statistics

In the 2021 Census of Population conducted by Statistics Canada, the RM of Rosedale No. 283 had a population of 542 living in 146 of its 158 total private dwellings, a change of 3% from its 2016 population of 526. With a land area of 923.87 km^{2} (356.71 sq mi), it had a population density of 0.6/km^{2} (1.5/sq mi) in 2021.

In the 2016 Census of Population, the RM of Rosedale No. 283 recorded a population of 526 living in 147 of its 153 total private dwellings, a 2.1% change from its 2011 population of 515. With a land area of 921.51 km^{2} (355.80 sq mi), it had a population density of 0.6/km^{2} (1.5/sq mi) in 2016.

== Government ==
The RM of Rosedale No. 283 is governed by an elected municipal council and an appointed administrator that meets on the second Tuesday of every month. The reeve of the RM is Nick Patkau while its administrator is Danielle Hache. The RM's office is located in Hanley.

== Transportation ==
Rail

- Regina Branch C.N.R—serves Davidson, Bladworth, Kenaston, Strong, Hanley, Indi, Dundurn, Strehlow, Haultain, Grasswood, Nutana, Saskatoon

Roads

- Highway 11—serves Hanley, Saskatchewan
- Highway 764—serves Hanley, Saskatchewan
- Highway 15—located between Hanley, Saskatchewan and Hawarden, Saskatchewan runs east-west
- Highway 19—serves Hawarden, Saskatchewan

== See also ==
- List of rural municipalities in Saskatchewan
