= Douglas Provincial Park =

Provincial park in Saskatchewan, Canada

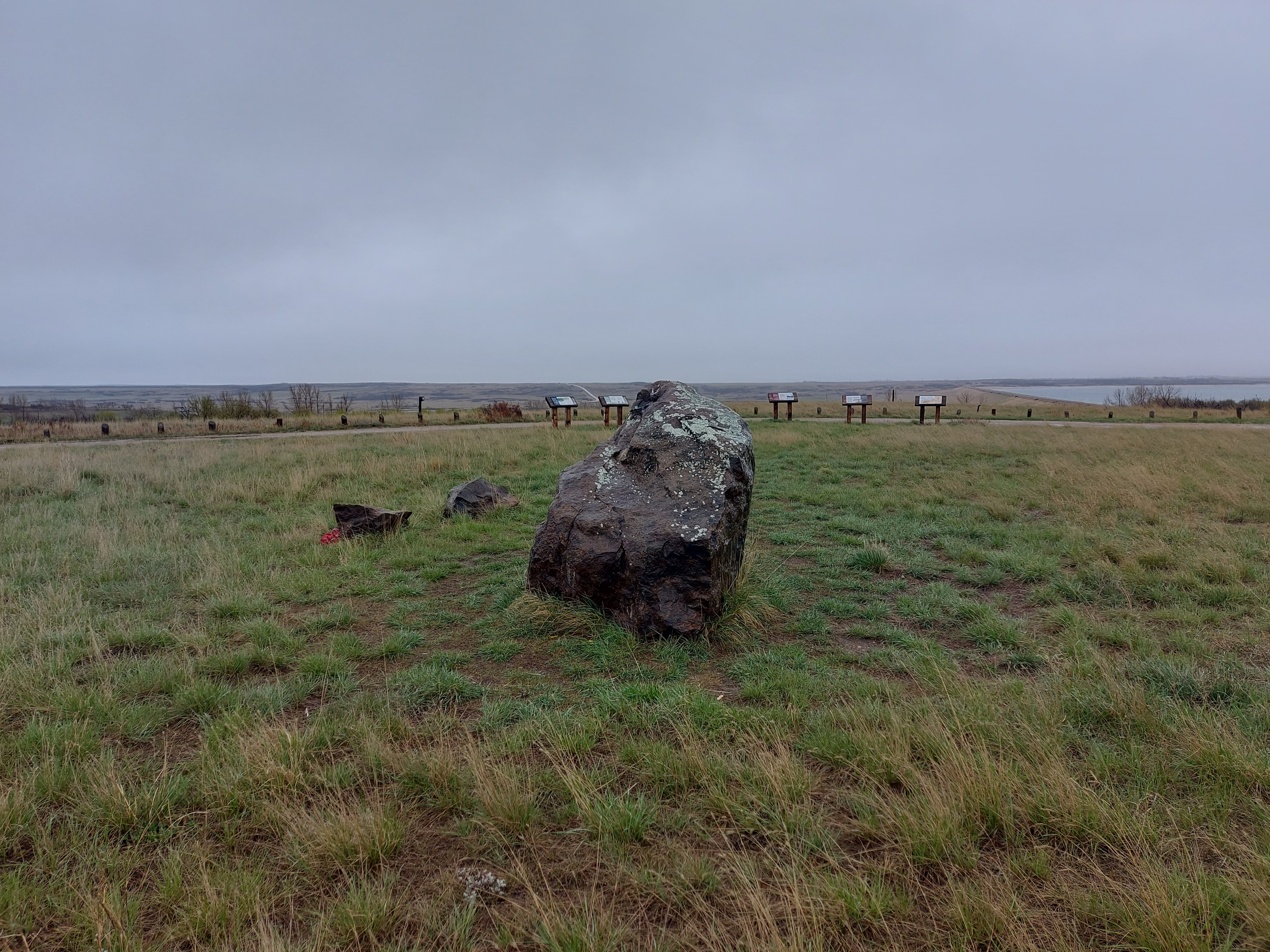
- Sacred stone in Douglas Provincial park (Lake Diefenbaker and Qu'Appelle Dam in background)

- Location within Saskatchewan Location within Canada
- Interactive map of Douglas Provincial Park
- Location: Saskatchewan, Canada
- Nearest city: Elbow
- Coordinates: 51.0491°N 106.4686°W
- Area: 6,300 ha (16,000 acres)
- Established: 1973
- Governing body: Sask Parks

Douglas Provincial Park is a provincial park in the Canadian province of Saskatchewan. Established in 1973, it is named after Tommy Douglas, the seventh premier of Saskatchewan and father of Canada's first single-payer, universal health care programme. The park is located along the Gordon McKenzie Arm of Lake Diefenbaker and at the Qu'Appelle River Dam, which is the source of the Qu'Appelle River. The closest community is Elbow and access to the park is from Highway 19.

Attractions to the park include access to Lake Diefenbaker, camping, hiking, and the Elbow Sand Hills. Less than 10 kilometres (6.2 mi) north of the park and just south of Elbow is Harbor Golf Club & Resort.

== Attractions and amenities ==
Located on the shores of Lake Diefenbaker, the largest body of water in southern Saskatchewan, Douglas Provincial Park has many recreational activities associated with the lake from swimming to boating to fishing. Inside the park, there is a campground, hiking trails, picnic area, and sand dunes.

There are 150 campsites in total, 140 of which are electrified. Campground services include laundry facilities, potable water, washrooms/showers, sani-dump, convenience store, concession stand, and a fish cleaning station.

Douglas Provincial Park has two different trail systems–the Trans Canada Trail and the Dunes Nature Centre Trail. The portion of the Trans Canada Trail in the park is about 12 kilometres (7.5 mi) long and it begins at the beach. It winds its way around the campground through birch forests and flat prairie with views of Lake Diefenbaker. The Trans Canada Trail continues on out of the park and heads north for about 30 kilometres (19 mi) towards Danielson Provincial Park. The Dunes Nature Centre Trails system is made up of different trails that traverse different parts of the sand dunes.

== Elbow Sand Hills ==
Elbow Sand Hills, also known as the Sand Hills and Douglas Sand Dunes, are glacially deposited sand dunes that cover an area of about 13,500 ha (33,000 acres) at the head of the Qu'Appelle River. The tallest dune is almost 30 metres (98 ft) high and more than a kilometre long.

The Elbow Sand Hills, and neighbouring Great Sand Hills, were formed about 12,000 years ago near the end of the last ice age. As the glaciers were retreating, they created proglacial lakes, spillways (South Saskatchewan Valley and Qu'Appelle Valley), and huge piles of sandy debris, glacial till, and moraines. This debris is what makes up the sand dunes.

Flora found in and around the dunes includes prairie grasses, western spiderworts, aspens, prickly pear cacti, and ball cacti.

== Gallery ==
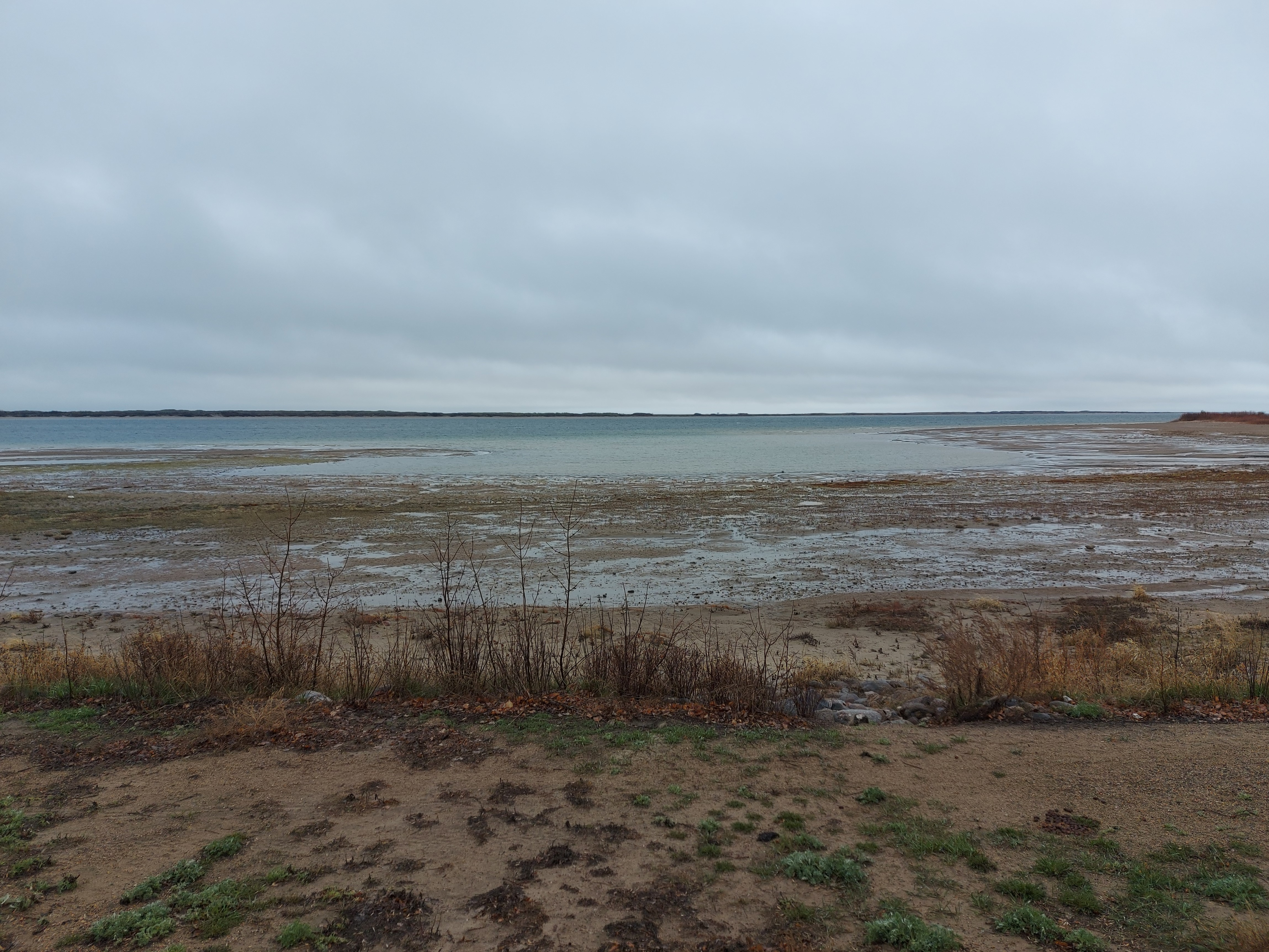
Lake Diefenbaker

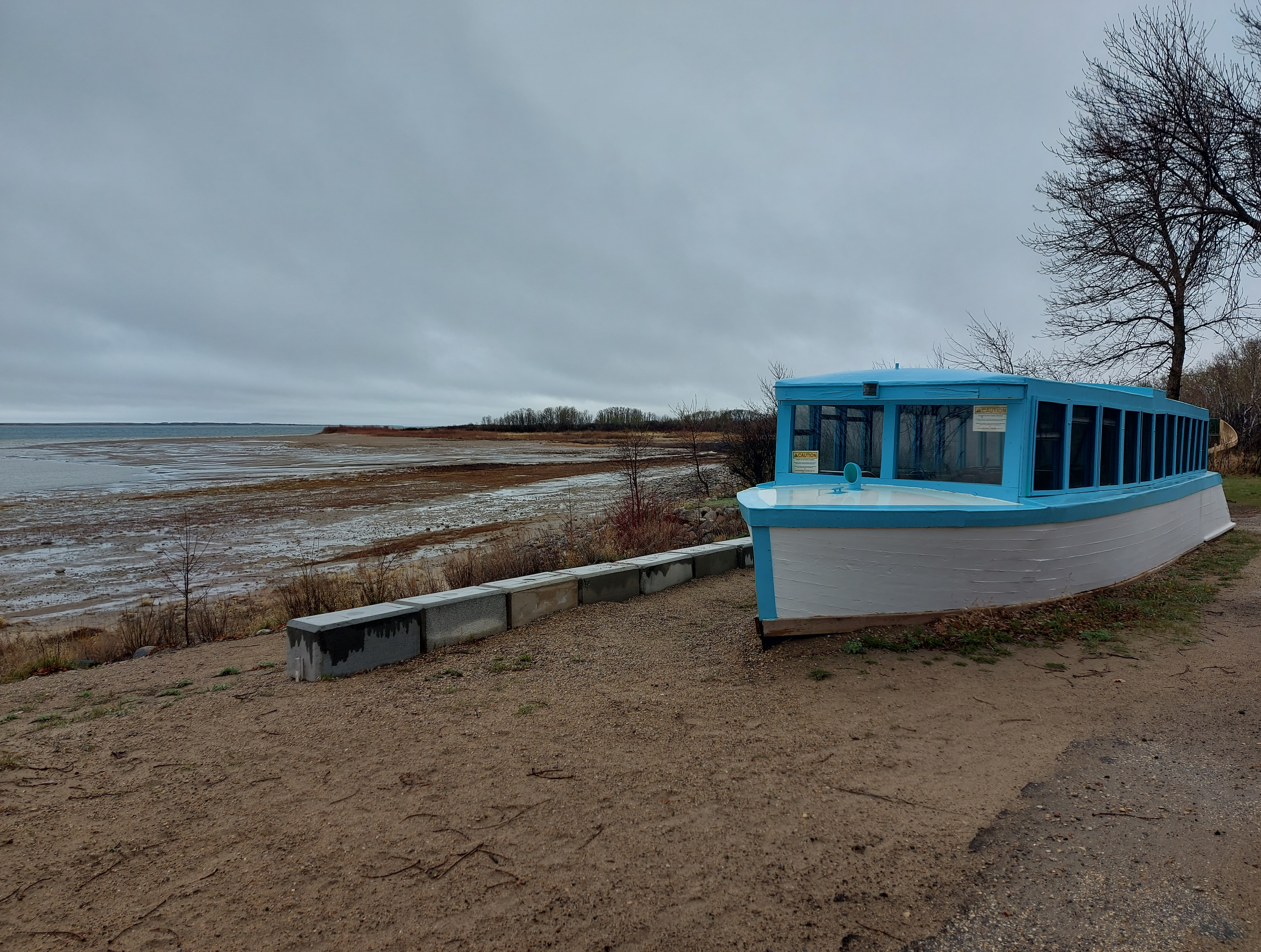
A boat turned into a dining area on the beach

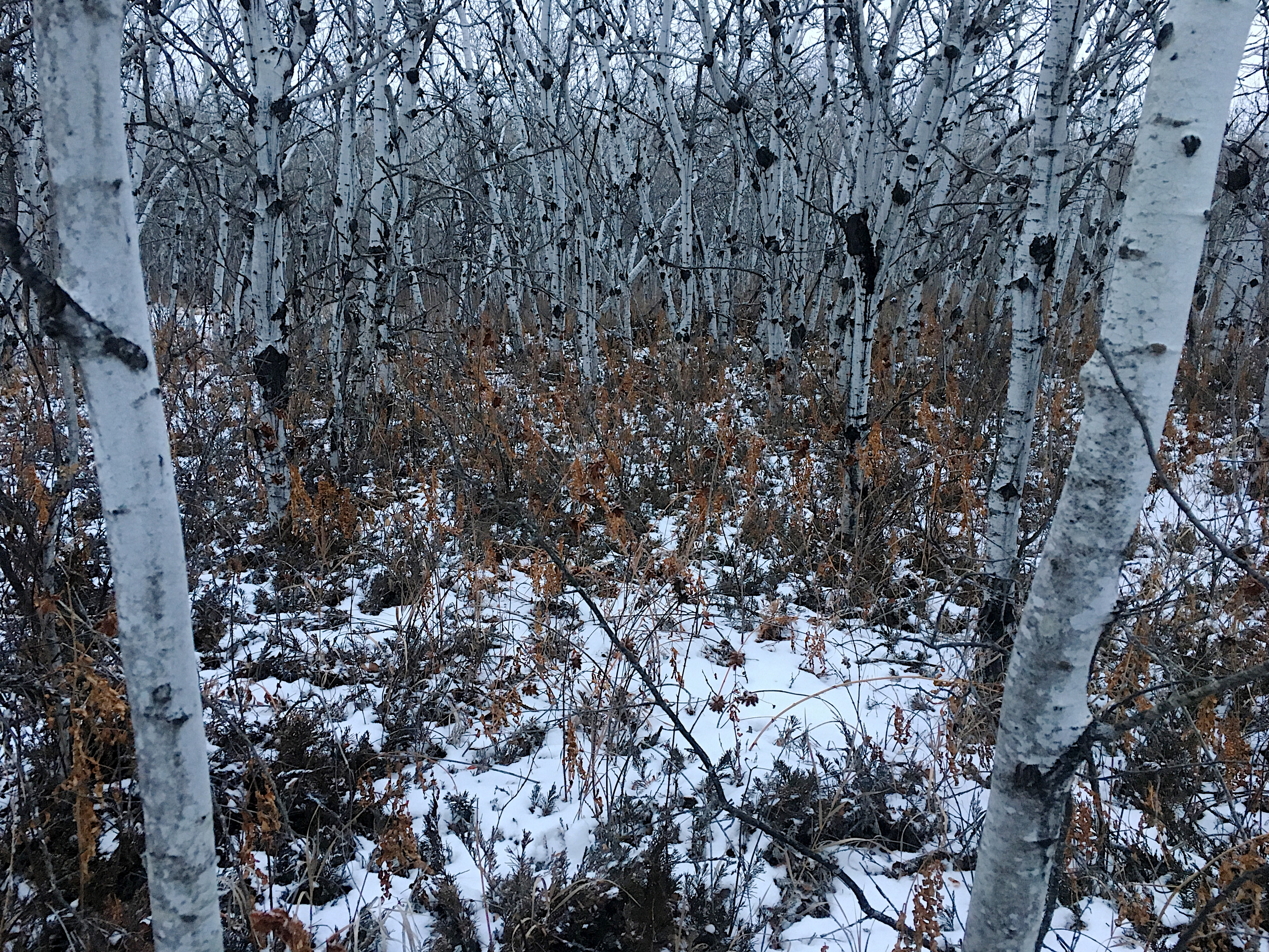

== See also ==
- List of protected areas of Saskatchewan
- Geology of Saskatchewan
- Geography of Saskatchewan
- Tourism in Saskatchewan
