= Coteau Creek Hydroelectric Station =

Hydroelectric station in Saskatchewan, Canada

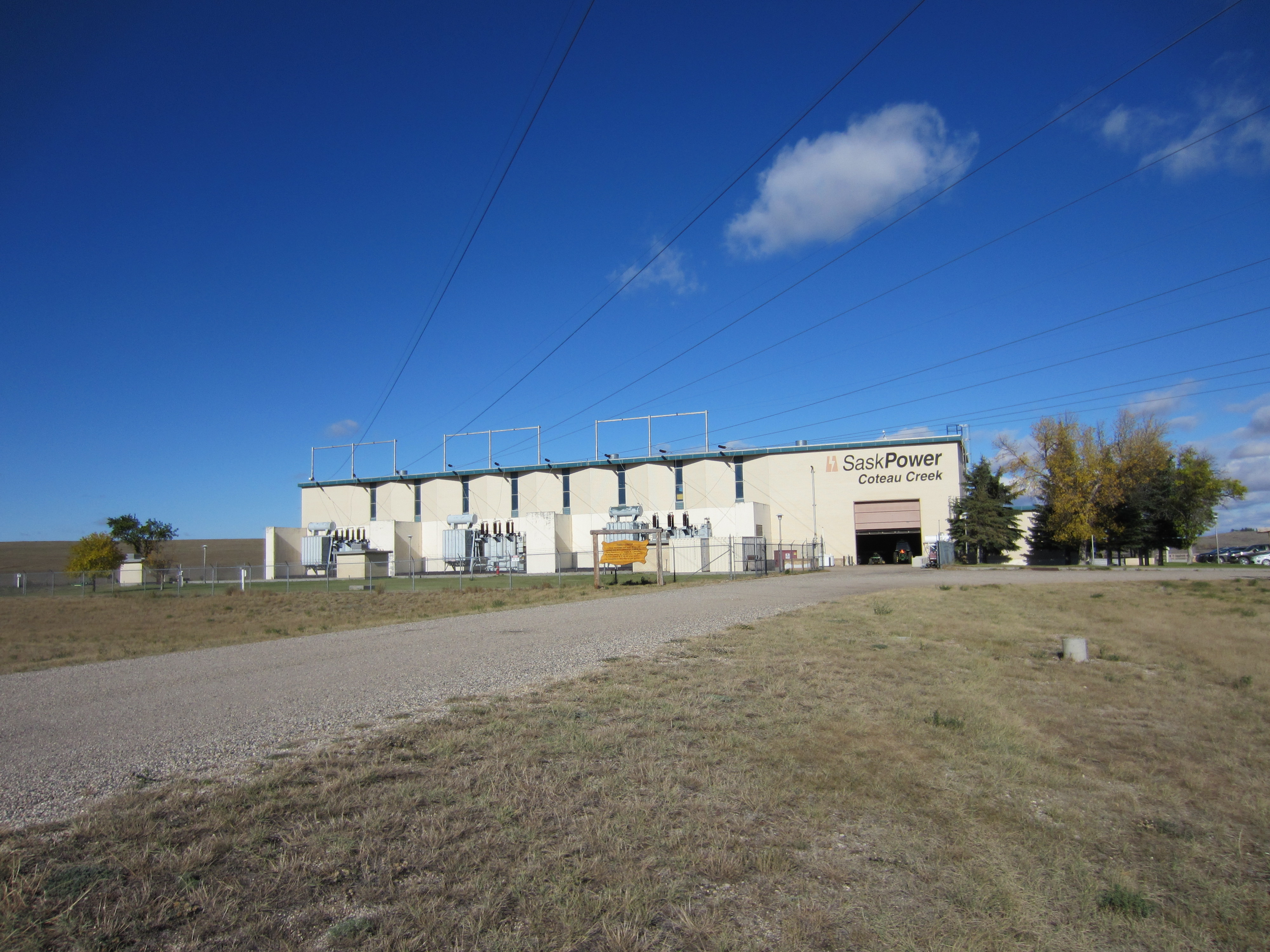
- Couteau Creek powerhouse seen from upstream (south) side

- Location within Saskatchewan
- Interactive map of Coteau Creek Hydroelectric Station
- Country: Canada
- Location: Fertile Valley No. 285, near Gardiner Dam, Saskatchewan
- Coordinates: 51°16′30″N 106°52′23″W
- Status: Operational
- Opening date: June 7, 1969
- Owner: SaskPower

Power Station
- Installed capacity: 186 MW

Coteau Creek Hydroelectric Station is a hydroelectric station owned by SaskPower, located near Danielson Provincial Park about 100 kilometres (62 mi) south-west of Saskatoon, between the towns of Outlook and Elbow. The station is on the South Saskatchewan River and draws water from the Gardiner Dam and is named after a nearby tributary to the South Saskatchewan River.

The Gardiner Dam was constructed between 1959 and 1967. The generating station required nearly three years to construct at a cost of CDN $40 million and became operational in 1969.

== Description ==
The Coteau Creek Hydroelectric Station has three 62 net MW vertical Francis turbine-generator units. The turbines were supplied by English Electric with generators made by the Canadian division of Westinghouse. Each turbine draws water from an intake and control structure on Gardiner Dam, through an underground steel penstock.

The powerhouse building is 87.5 metres long, 20.1 metres wide and 38.4 metres high. In a normal waterflow year, the station can generate 800 million kilowatthours, about 5% of Saskatchewan's annual electric energy (as much as 100,000 Saskpower customers use in a year). A nearby substation contains circuit breakers and other apparatus that connects the power station to the transmission grid.

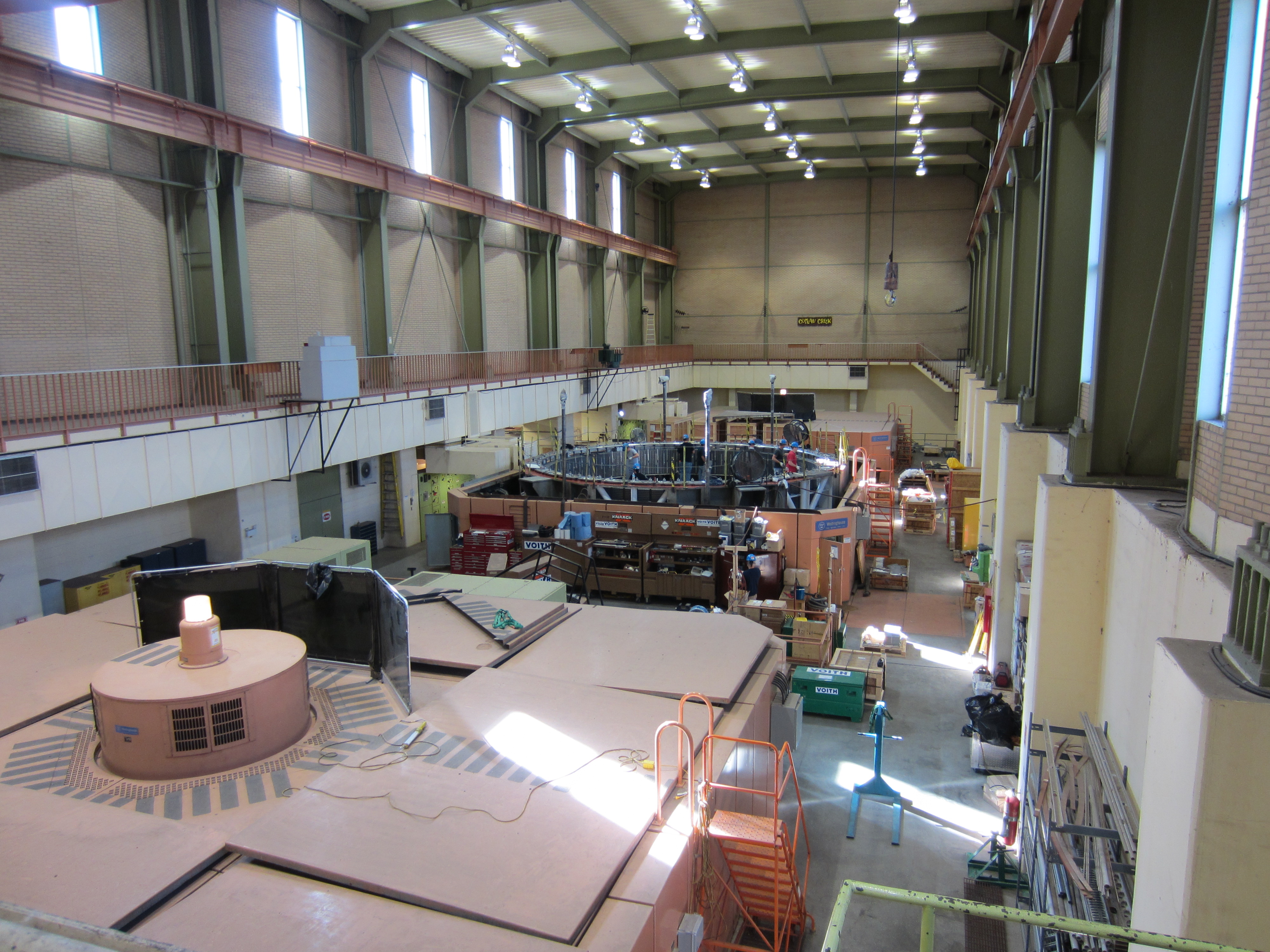
Interior of Coteau Creek powerhouse during 2013 rewind of Unit 2 generator.

== See also ==
- List of generating stations in Saskatchewan
