= Strongfield =

Village in Saskatchewan, Canada

Coordinates: 51.33190°N 106.58978°W

Location of Strongfield in Saskatchewan

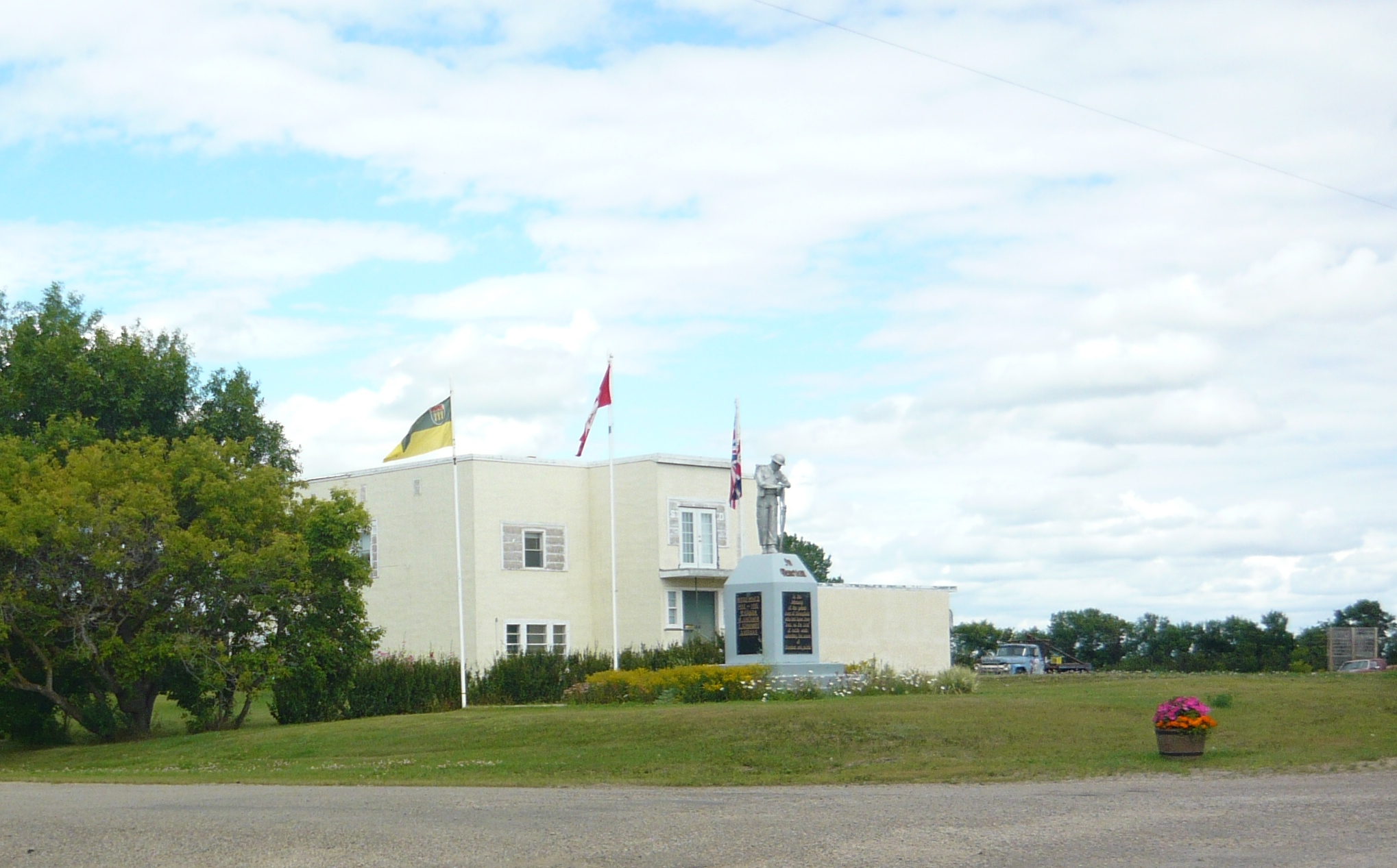
War memorial

Strongfield (2016 population: 40) is a village in the Canadian province of Saskatchewan within the Rural Municipality of Loreburn No. 254 and Census Division No. 11. It lies approximately 100 km south of the city of Saskatoon on Highway 19 between its sister communities of Hawarden and Loreburn.

Strongfield was once a booming village with an elementary school, post office, car and farm equipment dealerships, two Saskatchewan Wheat Pool grain elevators, small restaurants and other shops. Today the school no longer exists and most of the businesses have long been closed down.

The village features hockey and curling rinks, an Elks lodge, the Strongfield café and post office, and a small United Church. The town is near the South Saskatchewan River, and the man-made Lake Diefenbaker created by the Gardiner Dam, one of the world's largest earth-filled dams. In the centre of the village is a cenotaph to Strongfield's fallen soldiers of both World Wars.

== History ==
Strongfield's beginnings lie from 1903 and the great wave of Western settlement and development of the Canadian prairies. Strongfield incorporated as a village on May 3, 1912. From that time on it progressed as the economic and social hub of the expanding population in the area.

The area was first surveyed by government surveyor J.A. Maddock and crew from May to July 1883, shortly after the former Hudson's Bay Company lands became part of Canada to be organized as the Northwest Territories. The surveying system of the Canadian prairies was based on a similar system adopted in the United States. Townships were divided into 36 sections of 640 acres (2.6 km^{2}) each. The 640-acre (2.6 km^{2}) square was further divided into quarter sections of 160 acres (0.65 km^{2}). Strongfield would eventually be situated on township 27, range 5, west of the third meridian.

The Dominion government, seeking to reassure the railway companies that the West was good agricultural land, enlisted the aid of two Canadians, Col. Davidson (for whom the nearby town of Davidson is named) and A.D. McRae. They visited the prairies and went to the United States to seek capital. They formed the Saskatchewan Valley Land Company, bought 500,000 acres (2000 km^{2}) of land between Saskatoon and Regina from the Dominion Government at a dollar an acre and began to promote settlement. The company subsequently bought 1,250,000 acres (5060 km^{2}) from the railway companies at $1.75 an acre. They recruited over two thousand land agents and sold the land at $1.75 an acre in 1901. This price later rose to seven and then to ten dollars an acre.

George Armstrong, a Markdale, Ontario businessman, was one of these agents and it is probably due to his influence and encouragement that over a third of the early settlers were former residents of the Markdale-Meaford area in Ontario.

Another large segment of the early population consisted of Finnish settlers from the Dakotas who came to take homesteads along the banks of the South Saskatchewan River. There are few descendants of these settlers left in the Strongfield area as most sold their land to move to the west side of the river where the majority of the Finnish settlers lived.

The third major segment of the population of the area came from the Central United States and were largely of Norwegian descent. This was in large part due to the efforts of Norwegian Lutheran clergyman and founder of Hanley, Saskatchewan, Knute B. Birkeland who was instrumental through advertising in Norwegian-American newspapers in convincing many Norwegians in the Dakotas, Minnesota, Iowa, and Wisconsin to take up homesteads in Saskatchewan. Later, relatives of these early Norwegian pioneers would come directly from Norway as well.

Unlike most Saskatchewan villages, it experienced a boom in population and economy for a span of about ten years during the late fifties and early sixties due to the construction of the Gardiner Dam on the South Saskatchewan River some 20 km west.

== Demographics ==
Population history (1981–2016)
Year	Pop.	±%
1981	85	—
1986	67	−21.2%
1991	58	−13.4%
1996	49	−15.5%
2001	42	−14.3%
2006	47	+11.9%
2011	40	−14.9%
2016	40	+0.0%
Source: Statistics Canada via Saskatchewan Bureau of Statistics

In the 2021 Census of Population conducted by Statistics Canada, Strongfield had a population of 55 living in 28 of its 29 total private dwellings, a change of 37.5% from its 2016 population of 40. With a land area of 0.65 km^{2} (0.25 sq mi), it had a population density of 84.6/km^{2} (219.2/sq mi) in 2021.

In the 2016 Census of Population, the Village of Strongfield recorded a population of 40 living in 20 of its 20 total private dwellings, a 0% change from its 2011 population of 40. With a land area of 0.8 km^{2} (0.31 sq mi), it had a population density of 50.0/km^{2} (129.5/sq mi) in 2016.
