= Glenbain =

Community in Saskatchewan, Canada

Glenbain Glen Bain
- Hamlet
- Location within Saskatchewan Location within Canada
- Coordinates: 49°50′56″N 107°05′40″W
- Country: Canada
- Province: Saskatchewan
- Region: South-west
- Census division: 3
- Rural municipality: Glen Bain No. 105

Government
  - Reeve: Ross Turnbull
  - Administrator: Marilyn Scheller
  - Governing body: Glen Bain No. 105
- Time zone: UTC-6 (CST)
- Postal code: S0N 0X0
- Area code: 306
- Highways: Highway 19
- Railway: Canadian Pacific Railway

Glenbain is a hamlet and seat of the Rural Municipality of Glen Bain No. 105, Saskatchewan, Canada. It was on mile-53 of the Canadian Pacific Railway right of way, southeast of Swift Current.

== See also ==
- List of communities in Saskatchewan
- List of hamlets in Saskatchewan
