= Arbuthnot, Saskatchewan =

Arbuthnot
- Unincorporated community
- Location within Saskatchewan
- Coordinates: 49°49′N 106°54′W
- Country: Canada
- Province: Saskatchewan
- Region: south-central
- Census division: 3
- Rural Municipality: Glen Bain

Government
  - Type: Glen Bain Rural Municipality
- Time zone: UTC-6 (CST)
- Area code: 306
- Highways: Highway 43
- Railway: Canadian Pacific Railway

Arbuthnot (also known as Westlake, Ville Bouvier) is an unincorporated community located in Glen Bain Rural Municipality No. 105, Saskatchewan, Canada east of Route 19. It was located in census Division No. 2. It was on mile 63 of the Canadian Pacific Railway right of way, southeast of Swift Current and in the NW section 9- township 10- range 7 west of the third meridian.

Residential code 105.10 Regional Health Authority: Five Hills.

== Demographics ==
Arbuthnot was enumerated and administrated by the Glen Bain Rural Municipality. All that remains is one home.

== History ==
Etymology Named, according to E.T.Russell, after Sir Robert Arbuthnot, 4th Bt (1864–1916) or (less probably) after John Arbuthnot. Arbuthnot, Saskatchewan was located about 150 kilometres (93 mi) southwest of the City of Moose Jaw, just off of secondary road #611. While it does still appear on the map, the community was never incorporated as a village or town and is not listed in the municipal directory.

From Bill Barry's People Places: A Historical Gazetteer of Saskatchewan. The Canadian Pacific Railway built a station at this location between Vanguard and Meyronne in 1932. The preferred name of the settlers had been Stapleton after a pioneer settler, but the CPR held firm on its choice for its siding and the post office (which was open 1932-1969) followed suit.

The boom The rural municipality office put out a history book which listed some facts of this community which boomed around the 1940s. Andrew Miller Jr opened the general store in April 1935. In 1936 Andrew Miller Jr built a dance hall which was sold to John Silzer in 1939 and which burned down after a dance in 1942. Joe Schlageter opened a blacksmith's shop from 1936–40. The first school building was moved into Arbuthnot in May 1944 from Jim Thomas Sr's farm and was converted into a classroom. This was used until the Glen Rosa School was moved into Arbuthnot in the summer of 1949. This building was used until 1957. The school was bought by Arbuthnot Ladies Club. They later donated it to the Glen Bain Lions Club who moved it to Glen Bain 24 June 1981. Exy Grad had a motor service garage next to and north of Andrew J Miller's General Store. Peter Harms bought the General Store from Mr Miller around 1940 and operated it until it burned down on 2 December 1946. Mr Harms sold the store business to Peter Donauer and he opened a store on 18 December 1946 in the building which had previously been used as a school. He built a brand new store in 1947. Peter sold the store to F J Bolen on 24 September 1953. Frank and Tema Bolen operated the store until 1958. The store building was sold to John Thomas and he moved it to his farm south of Meyronne.

The decline The post office remained in the Bolen's store building until 1968. The first post office had been in the home of Mrs I P Johnston at the north end of the community and it was later moved into the general store.

The Arbuthnot Co-op was incorporated in 1935 and was managed in turn by Ed Faber, Charles Becker, Edwin Hepper, Bill Schlichting and Henry Schlageter. It was dissolved in 1963.

The Saskatchewan Pool elevator and the Pioneer Grain elevator were built in 1935. They built a house for the pool agent in 1947. The Saskatchewan Wheat Pool sold their elevator to the Pioneer Co. on 31 July 1974 and moved it to Aneroid on 21 August 1974. The Pioneer elevator was used until early 1984. It was demolished and burned on 21 December 1984. The Pioneer Elevator was managed by Dan Kohlenberg from Bateman, a community 25 miles (40 km) to the northeast of Arbuthnot. The Imperial Oil company was located on the west side of the road between Arbuthnot Hall (to the north) and Arbuthnot Co-op (to the south). It was managed by Herman Silzer. The Canadian Oil Co was managed by P Harms.

== Education ==
Arbuthnot no longer has a school, but those who live in or around Arbuthnot are sent to the neighbouring village of Gravelbourg which has a school that covers Kindergarten to Grade 12 serving approximately N/A students, but 2 elevators…

== See also ==
- List of communities in Saskatchewan
