= Rural Municipality of Glen Bain No. 105 =

Rural municipality in Saskatchewan, Canada

Glen Bain No. 105
- Rural municipality
- Rural Municipality of Glen Bain No. 105

- Location of the RM of Glen Bain No. 105 in Saskatchewan
- Coordinates: 49.917°N 107.026°W
- Country: Canada
- Province: Saskatchewan
- Census division: 3
- SARM division: 3
- Federal riding: Cypress Hills—Grasslands
- Provincial riding: Wood River
- Formed: December 11, 1911

Government
  - Reeve: Ted Wornath
  - Governing body: RM of Glen Bain No. 105 Council
  - Administrator: Audrey Rotheisler
  - Office location: Glen Bain

Area (2016)
  - Land: 843.4 km^{2} (325.6 sq mi)

Population (2016)
  - Total: 180
  - Density: 0.2/km^{2} (0.52/sq mi)
- Time zone: CST
  - Summer (DST): CST
- Postal code: S0N 0X0
- Area codes: 306 and 639
- Highway(s): Highway 19; Highway 43

The Rural Municipality of Glen Bain No. 105 (2016 population: 180) is a rural municipality (RM) in the Canadian province of Saskatchewan within Census Division No. 3 and SARM Division No. 3. It is located in the south-central portion of the province.

== History ==
The RM of Glen Bain No. 105 incorporated as a rural municipality on December 11, 1911.

== Geography ==
=== Communities and localities ===
The following unincorporated communities are within the RM.

Localities

- Arbuthnot, dissolved as a village
- Esme
- Glen Bain
- Royer
- St. Boswells

== Demographics ==
Population history (1981–2016)
Year	Pop.	±%
1981	516	—
1986	444	−14.0%
1991	419	−5.6%
1996	388	−7.4%
2001	305	−21.4%
2006	232	−23.9%
2011	205	−11.6%
2016	180	−12.2%
Source: Statistics Canada via Saskatchewan Bureau of Statistics

In the 2021 Census of Population conducted by Statistics Canada, the RM of Glen Bain No. 105 had a population of 195 living in 76 of its 96 total private dwellings, a change of 8.3% from its 2016 population of 180. With a land area of 827.17 km^{2} (319.37 sq mi), it had a population density of 0.2/km^{2} (0.6/sq mi) in 2021.

In the 2016 Census of Population, the RM of Glen Bain No. 105 recorded a population of 180 living in 77 of its 107 total private dwellings, a −12.2% change from its 2011 population of 205. With a land area of 843.4 km^{2} (325.6 sq mi), it had a population density of 0.2/km^{2} (0.6/sq mi) in 2016.

== Government ==
The RM of Glen Bain No. 105 is governed by an elected municipal council and an appointed administrator that meets on the second Tuesday of every month. The reeve of the RM is Ted Wornath while its administrator is Audrey Rotheisler. The RM's office is located in Glen Bain.

== See also ==
- Saskatchewan Association of Rural Municipalities
- List of rural municipalities in Saskatchewan
