= Division No. 11, Saskatchewan =

Census division in Canada

Coordinates: 52°07′N 106°39′W

Division No. 11
- Census division in Saskatchewan
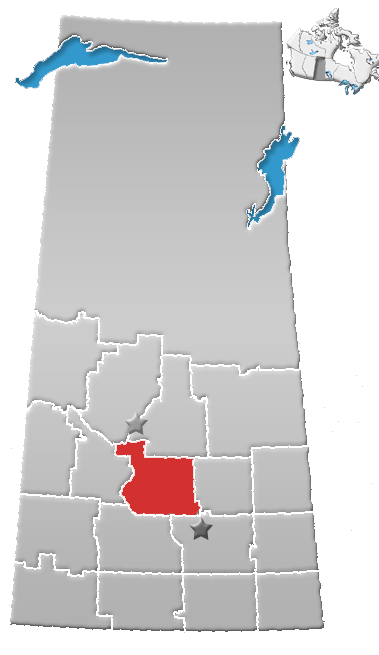
- Country: Canada
- Province: Saskatchewan

Area
  - Total: 16,692.08 km^{2} (6,444.85 sq mi)
- As of 2016

Population (2016)
  - Total: 303,423
  - Density: 18.1777/km^{2} (47.0799/sq mi)

Division No. 11 is one of eighteen census divisions in the province of Saskatchewan, Canada, as defined by Statistics Canada. It is located in the central part of the province and includes the largest city in the province, Saskatoon.

== Demographics ==
In the 2021 Census of Population conducted by Statistics Canada, Division No. 11 had a population of 326,109 living in 129,032 of its 139,667 total private dwellings, a change of 7.5% from its 2016 population of 303,423. With a land area of 16,602.58 km^{2} (6,410.29 sq mi), it had a population density of 19.6/km^{2} (50.9/sq mi) in 2021.

Knowledge of languages in Division No. 11 (1991−2021)
Language	2021		2011		2001		1991	
Language	Pop.	%	Pop.	%	Pop.	%	Pop.	%
English	315,660	98.78%	265,025	99.15%	233,160	99.58%	221,225	99.44%
French	18,925	5.92%	15,565	5.82%	14,295	6.11%	13,615	6.12%
Tagalog	12,730	3.98%	6,380	2.39%	1,195	0.51%	715	0.32%
Hindustani (Note: Combined responses of Hindi and Urdu as they form mutually intelligible registers of the Hindustani language.)	11,570	3.62%	4,145	1.55%	980	0.42%	740	0.33%
Chinese (Note: Combined responses of the Chinese languages, including Mandarin, Cantonese, Min Nan, Hakka, Wu (Shanghainese), Min Dong, Chinese, n.o.s., and Chinese languages, n.i.e..)	8,330	2.61%	4,900	1.83%	3,740	1.6%	3,065	1.38%
Punjabi	5,505	1.72%	1,435	0.54%	350	0.15%	270	0.12%
Spanish	4,955	1.55%	3,420	1.28%	2,135	0.91%	1,525	0.69%
Arabic	3,860	1.21%	1,610	0.6%	775	0.33%	320	0.14%
Ukrainian	3,780	1.18%	4,645	1.74%	6,320	2.7%	7,890	3.55%
German (Note: Combined responses of the High German languages, including Standard German, Pennsylvania German, Swiss German, and Yiddish.)	3,700	1.16%	6,570	2.46%	9,435	4.03%	12,310	5.53%
Russian	2,130	0.67%	1,415	0.53%	860	0.37%	1,015	0.46%
Cree (Note: Combined responses of the Cree-Innu languages, previously categorized under "Cree" in past censuses.)	2,025	0.63%	1,710	0.64%	2,550	1.09%	1,965	0.88%
Vietnamese	1,975	0.62%	1,045	0.39%	825	0.35%	770	0.35%
Persian (Note: Combined responses of Iranian Persian, Dari, and Persian (Farsi), n.o.s., as they form mutually intelligible registers of the Persian language)	1,130	0.35%	765	0.29%	300	0.13%	160	0.07%
Portuguese	755	0.24%	415	0.16%	415	0.18%	410	0.18%
Polish	715	0.22%	630	0.24%	760	0.32%	1,335	0.6%
Italian	590	0.18%	310	0.12%	465	0.2%	480	0.22%
Dutch	410	0.13%	480	0.18%	700	0.3%	930	0.42%
Greek	380	0.12%	385	0.14%	400	0.17%	590	0.27%
Hungarian	295	0.09%	330	0.12%	535	0.23%	685	0.31%
Total responses	319,545	97.99%	267,290	98.57%	234,150	98.54%	222,465	98.95%
Total population	326,109	100%	271,170	100%	237,629	100%	224,832	100%

== Census subdivisions ==
The following census subdivisions (municipalities or municipal equivalents) are located within Saskatchewan's Division No. 11.

=== Cities ===
- Martensville
- Saskatoon
- Warman

=== Towns ===
- Allan
- Colonsay
- Dalmeny
- Davidson
- Dundurn
- Govan
- Hanley
- Imperial
- Langham
- Lanigan
- Nokomis
- Osler
- Outlook
- Watrous

=== Villages ===
- Bladworth
- Bradwell
- Broderick
- Clavet
- Drake
- Duval
- Elbow
- Glenside
- Hawarden
- Kenaston
- Liberty
- Loreburn
- Meacham
- Plunkett
- Simpson
- Strongfield
- Viscount
- Young
- Zelma

=== Resort villages ===
- Etters Beach
- Manitou Beach
- Shields
- Thode

=== Rural municipalities ===
- RM No. 250 Last Mountain Valley
- RM No. 251 Big Arm
- RM No. 252 Arm River
- RM No. 253 Willner
- RM No. 254 Loreburn
- RM No. 280 Wreford
- RM No. 281 Wood Creek
- RM No. 282 McCraney
- RM No. 283 Rosedale
- RM No. 284 Rudy
- RM No. 310 Usborne
- RM No. 312 Morris
- RM No. 313 Lost River
- RM No. 314 Dundurn
- RM No. 340 Wolverine
- RM No. 341 Viscount
- RM No. 342 Colonsay
- RM No. 343 Blucher
- RM No. 344 Corman Park

=== Indian reserves ===
- Whitecap 94

== See also ==
- List of census divisions of Saskatchewan
- List of communities in Saskatchewan
