= Rural Municipality of Loreburn No. 254 =

Rural municipality in Saskatchewan, Canada

Loreburn No. 254
- Rural municipality
- Rural Municipality of Loreburn No. 254
- Location of the RM of Loreburn No. 254 in Saskatchewan
- Coordinates: 51.256°N 106.808°W
- Country: Canada
- Province: Saskatchewan
- Census division: 11
- SARM division: 5
- Formed: December 12, 1910

Government
  - Reeve: Brad Norrish
  - Governing body: RM of Loreburn No. 254 Council
  - Administrator: Vanessa Tastad
  - Office location: Loreburn

Area (2016)
  - Land: 966.78 km^{2} (373.28 sq mi)

Population (2016)
  - Total: 327
  - Density: 0.3/km^{2} (0.78/sq mi)
- Time zone: CST
  - Summer (DST): CST
- Area codes: 306 and 639

The Rural Municipality of Loreburn No. 254 (2016 population: 327) is a rural municipality (RM) in the Canadian province of Saskatchewan within Census Division No. 11 and SARM Division No. 5. It is located in the south-central portion of the province.

== History ==
The RM of Loreburn No. 254 incorporated as a rural municipality on December 12, 1910.

== Geography ==
=== Communities and localities ===
The following urban municipalities are surrounded by the RM.

Villages

- Elbow
- Hawarden
- Loreburn
- Strongfield

The following unincorporated communities are within the RM.

Localities

- Cutbank

== Attractions ==
- Danielson Provincial Park
- Elbow Harbour Recreation Site
- Gardiner Dam

== Demographics ==
Population history (1981–2016)
Year	Pop.	±%
1981	569	—
1986	505	−11.2%
1991	474	−6.1%
1996	422	−11.0%
2001	384	−9.0%
2006	350	−8.9%
2011	346	−1.1%
2016	327	−5.5%
Source: Statistics Canada via Saskatchewan Bureau of Statistics

In the 2021 Census of Population conducted by Statistics Canada, the RM of Loreburn No. 254 had a population of 380 living in 140 of its 151 total private dwellings, a change of 16.2% from its 2016 population of 327. With a land area of 958.42 km^{2} (370.05 sq mi), it had a population density of 0.4/km^{2} (1.0/sq mi) in 2021.

In the 2016 Census of Population, the RM of Loreburn No. 254 recorded a population of 327 living in 122 of its 132 total private dwellings, a −5.5% change from its 2011 population of 346. With a land area of 966.78 km^{2} (373.28 sq mi), it had a population density of 0.3/km^{2} (0.9/sq mi) in 2016.

== Government ==
The RM of Loreburn No. 254 is governed by an elected municipal council and an appointed administrator that meet on the second Wednesday of every month. The reeve of the RM is Brad Norrish while its administrator is Vanessa Tastad. The RM's office is located in Loreburn.

== See also ==
- List of rural municipalities in Saskatchewan
