= Hanley, Saskatchewan =

Town in Saskatchewan, Canada

Town of Hanley
- Town
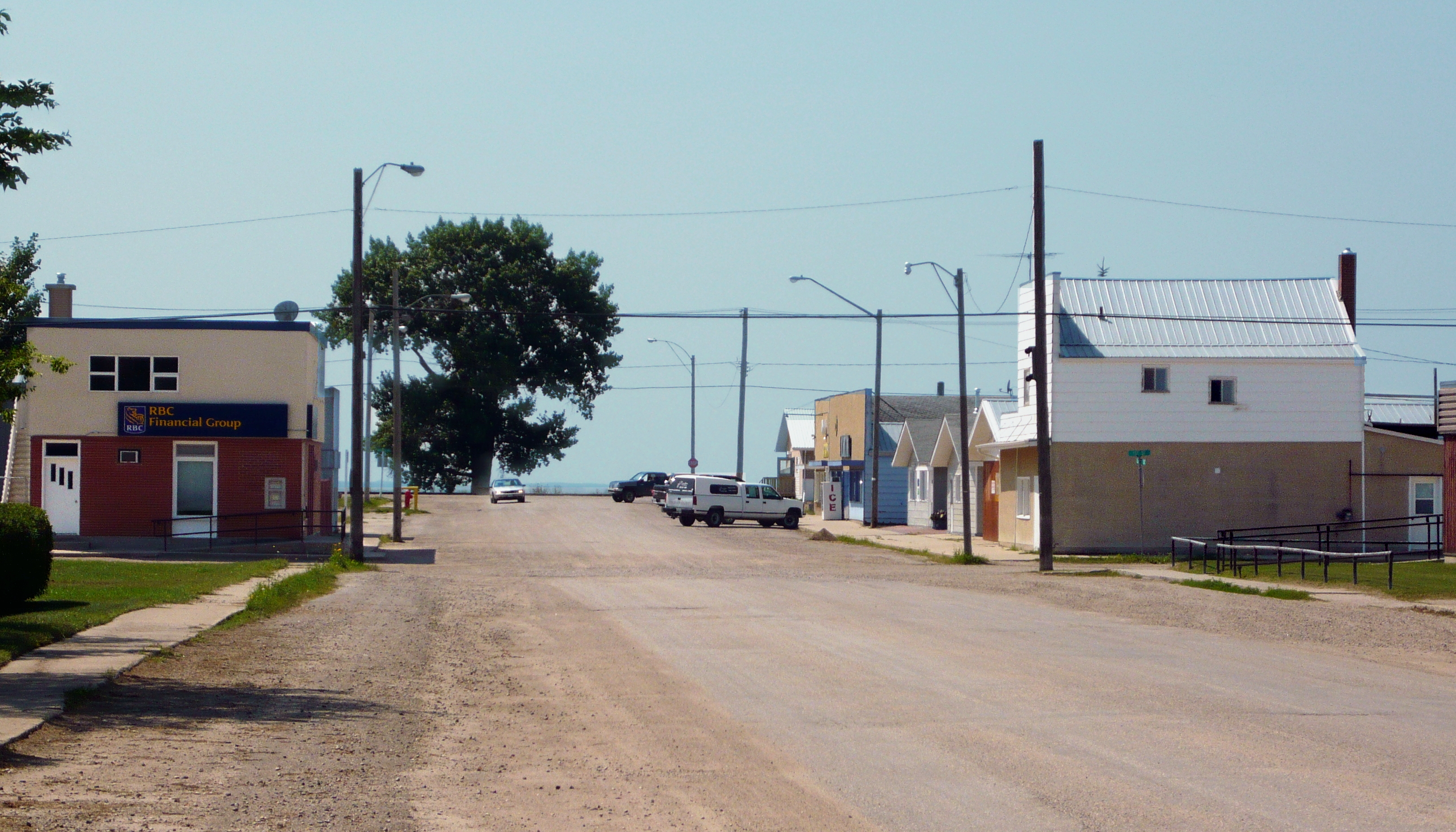
- Hanley's Business District

- Location of Hanley in Saskatchewan Town of Hanley (Canada)
- Coordinates: 51.62°N 106.43°W
- Country: Canada
- Province: Saskatchewan
- Founded: 1902
- Town Incorporated: 1906

Government
  - Mayor: Marvin Gerbrandt
  - Administrator: Darice Carlson
  - Governing body: Hanley Town Council

Area
  - Total: 2.66 km^{2} (1.03 sq mi)

Population (2021)
  - Total: 540
  - Density: 202.8/km^{2} (525/sq mi)
- Time zone: CST
- Postal code: S0G 2E0
- Area code: 306
- Highways: Highway 11
- Website: Official Site

Hanley is a town in Division No. 11 in Saskatchewan, Canada. It is located 65 kilometres (40 mi) south of Saskatoon. The town's population in 2021 was 540. It was named after Hanley, Staffordshire, England, by early founders. It is also the seat for the Rural Municipality of Rosedale No. 283.

== History ==
Hanley was founded in 1902 and incorporated as a town in 1906. It is a typical small agricultural community in the grain-growing region of Southern Saskatchewan. Thousands of settlers came into the area in the early 20th century after land speculators had procured the lands. Early settlers came from the UK, Eastern Canada, America, and Scandinavia. A large community of Norwegian descendants still makes up a significant percentage of the area's residents and there is also a substantial Mennonite-German community.

There are several reservoirs in the region and some limited irrigation projects have utilized them. Wheat, barley, canola, alfalfa, hay, flax, oats, rye, and specialty crops are grown in the area. There is also cattle ranching and other specialty livestock production.

Hanley is typical of small "Dust Belt" towns of the North American Great Plains and there has been a great decrease in the rural population and consolidation of agricultural industries of this region in the last 20 years. Consequently, the tax base is in decline. Hanley has no industries but there is a school, a Royal Canadian Mounted Police depot, churches, post office, and some businesses. Hanley's population is growing with a number of young families relocating in the past few years. Although there are no longer grain elevators, train station or loading platforms, the Canadian National's Saskatoon/Regina railway still passes through the community. Rail cars can be seen sitting waiting to be loaded with grain in the fall and spring. It is also on Provincial Highway 11. Hanley was once noted for being an important community in this region of Saskatchewan and several railroads were to come through this community and for many years up until the 1960s, was an important trading and business centre in the region.

There were some grand buildings and homes in the town including one of the few Opera Houses in Canada, the Lawrence House Mansion and one of the largest and finest brick schools in the region. All are now gone.

== Demographics ==
In the 2021 Census of Population conducted by Statistics Canada, Hanley had a population of 540 living in 228 of its 248 total private dwellings, a change of 5.7% from its 2016 population of 511. With a land area of 2.66 km^{2} (1.03 sq mi), it had a population density of 203.0/km^{2} (525.8/sq mi) in 2021.

== Education ==
Hanley Composite School, under the Prairie Spirit School Division, is a K-12 School with about 270 Students. Students from Dundurn Elementary School finish their schooling at Hanley School. Hanley School is the home of the Sabers; the Hanley Sabers won the 2009 provincial championship for 1A 6-man football.

== See also ==
- List of towns in Saskatchewan
