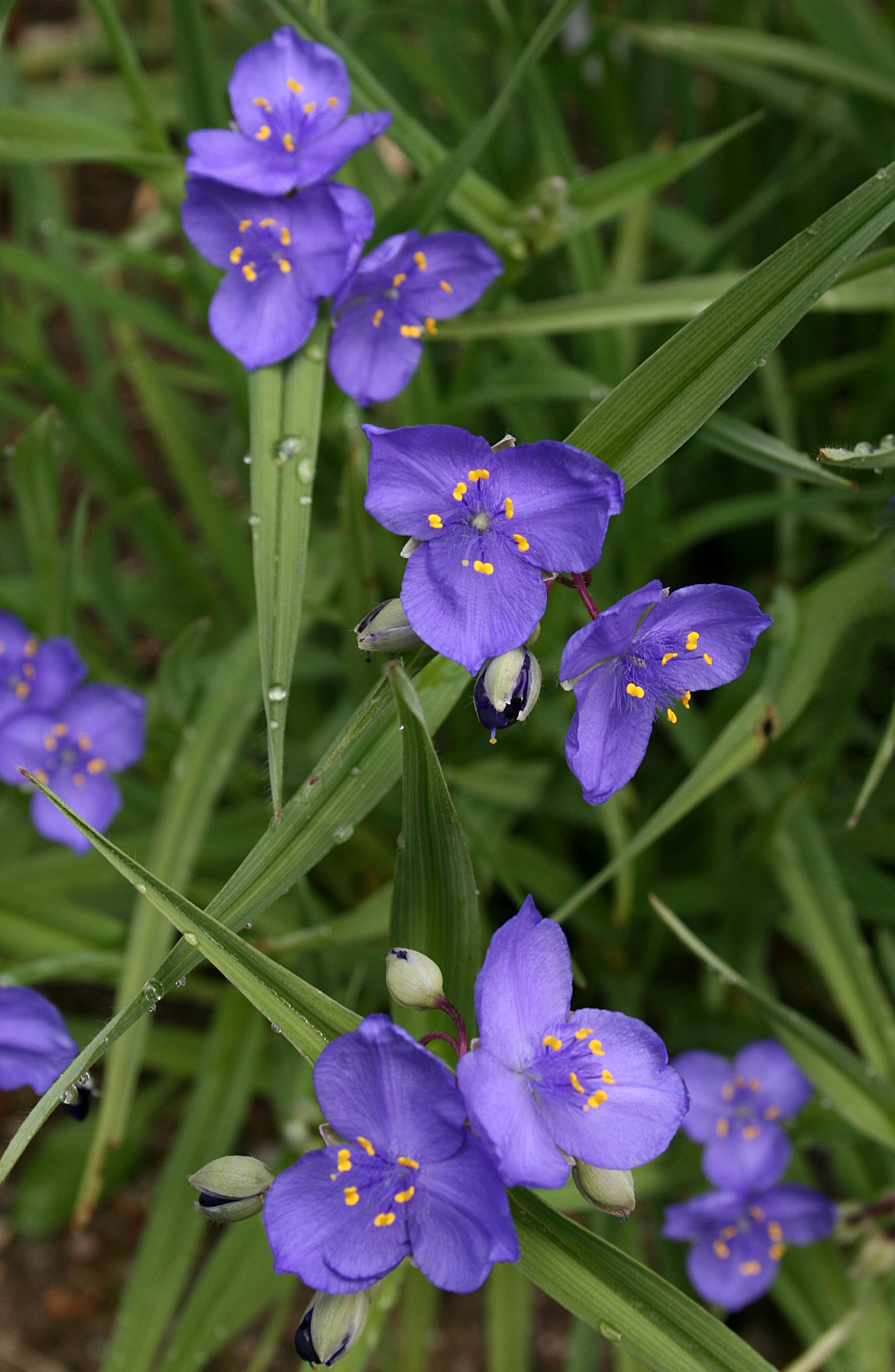

Conservation status
- Least Concern (IUCN 3.1)

- Secure (NatureServe)

Scientific classification
- Kingdom: Plantae
- Clade: Tracheophytes
- Clade: Angiosperms
- Clade: Monocots
- Clade: Commelinids
- Order: Commelinales
- Family: Commelinaceae
- Genus: Tradescantia
- Species: T. occidentalis

Binomial name
- Tradescantia occidentalis (Britton) Smyth

Varieties
- Tradescantia occidentalis var. melanthera; Tradescantia occidentalis var. occidentalis; Tradescantia occidentalis var. scopulorum

= Tradescantia occidentalis =

Western spiderwort

Species of flowering plant

Tradescantia occidentalis, the prairie spiderwort or western spiderwort, is a plant in the dayflower family, Commelinaceae. It is common and widespread across the western Great Plains of the United States, as well as in Arizona, New Mexico, southern Utah, and Sonora, but is listed as a threatened species in Canada.

Like in a few other species of Tradescantia, the cells of the stamen hairs of Western spiderwort are normally colored blue, but when exposed to neutron radiation or other forms of ionizing radiation, the cells mutate and change color to pink. Thus the plant can be used as a bioassay for radiation.

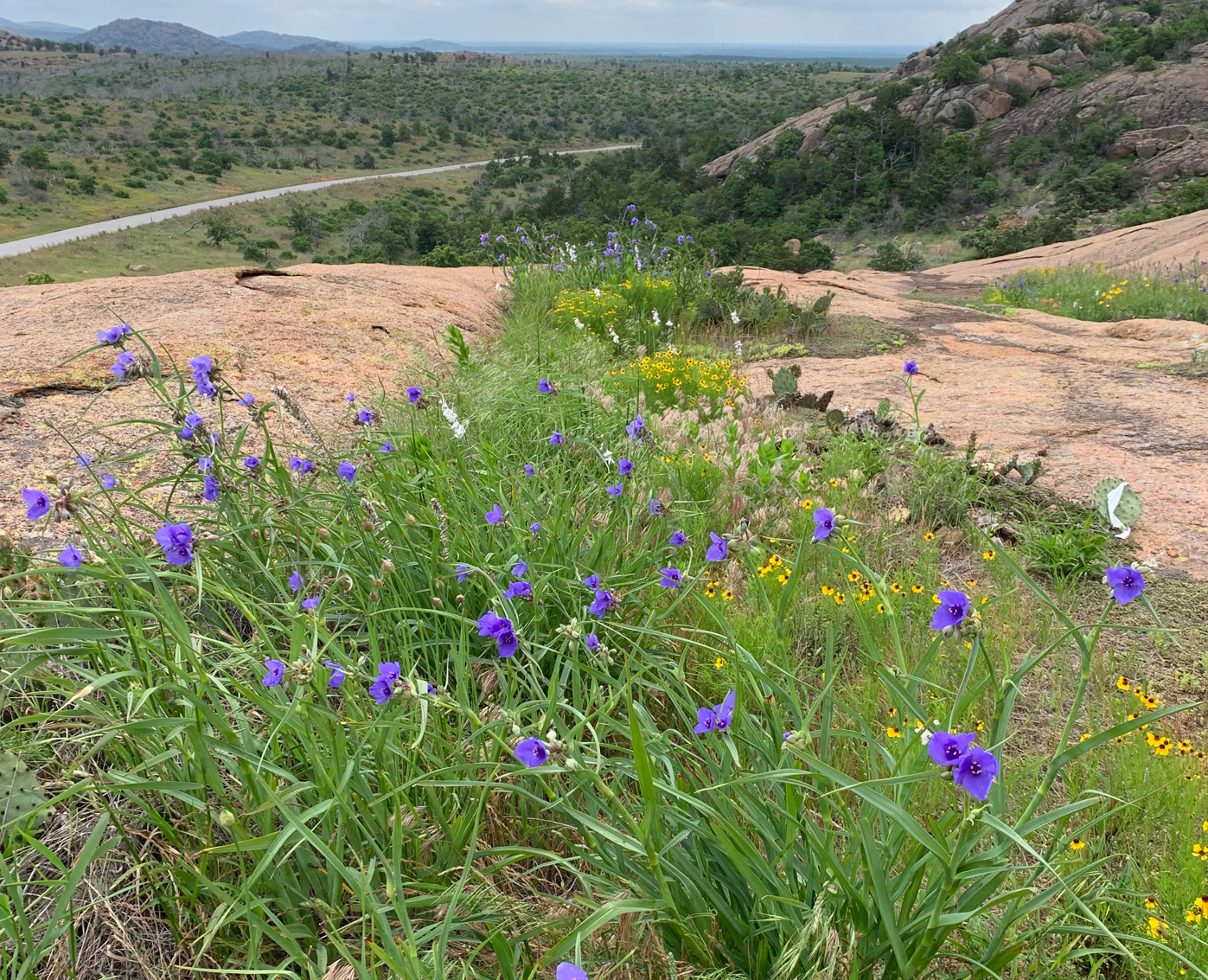
Prairie spiderwort (tradescantia occidentalis) in the Wichita Mountains, southwest Oklahoma.

== Gallery ==
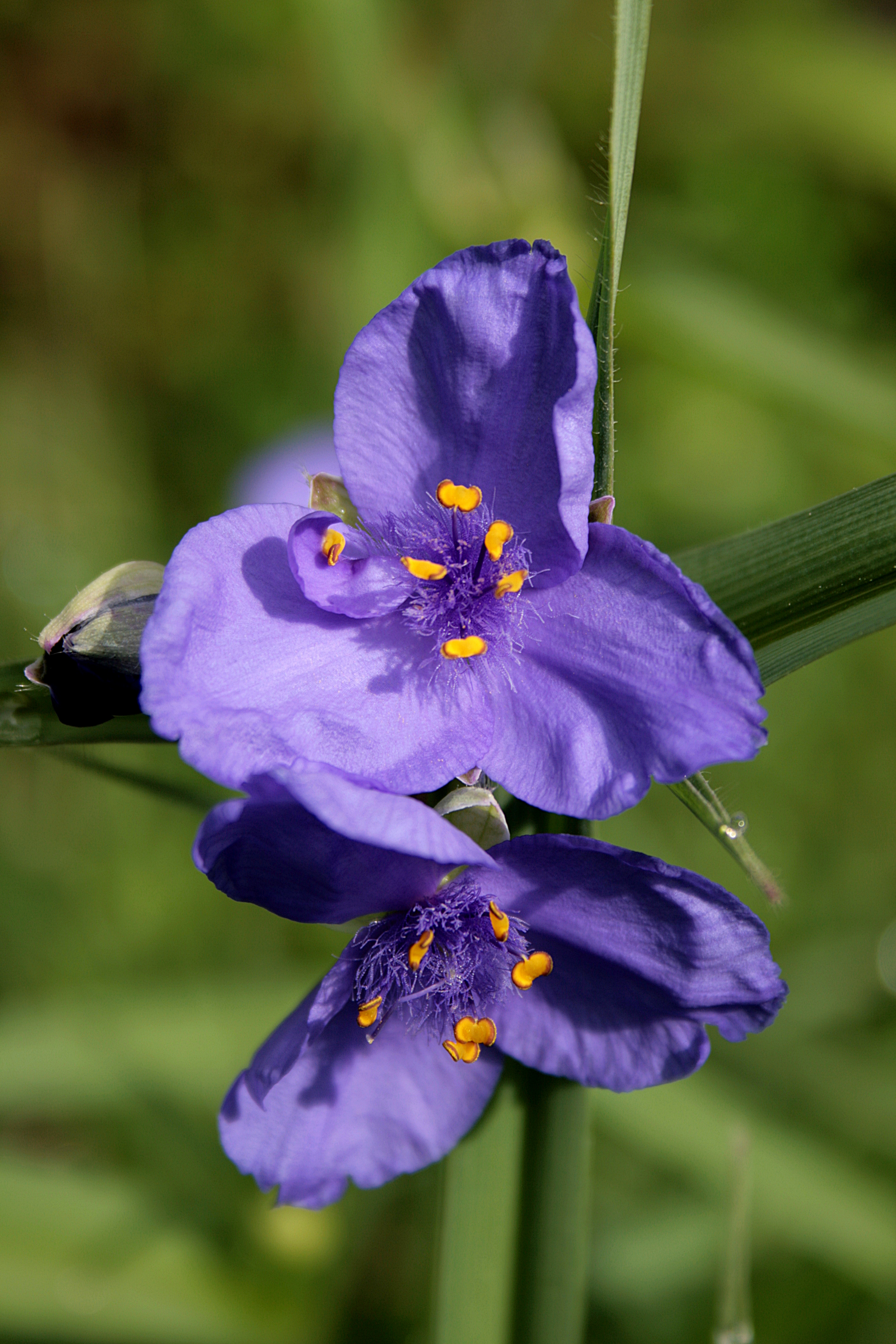

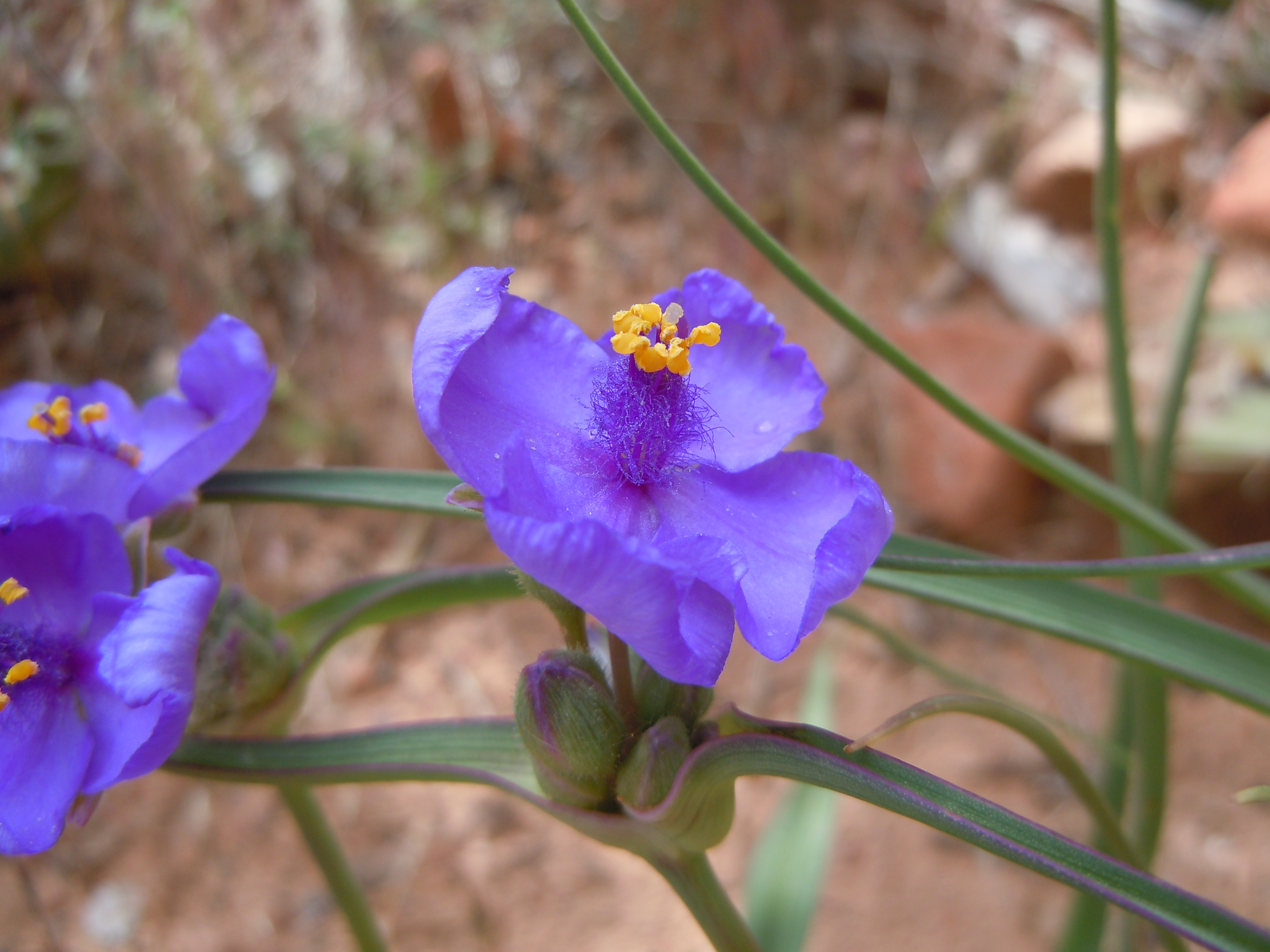

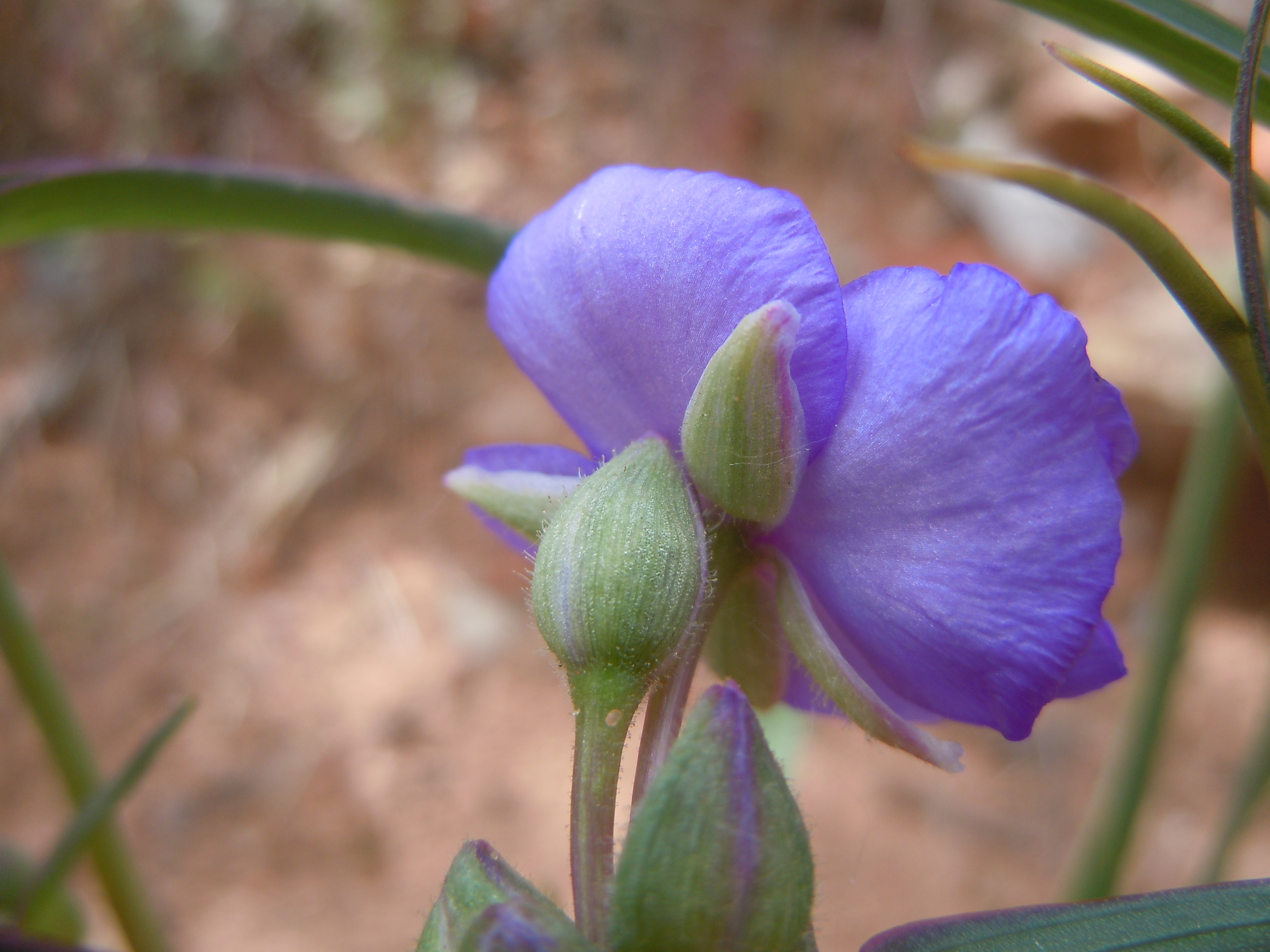

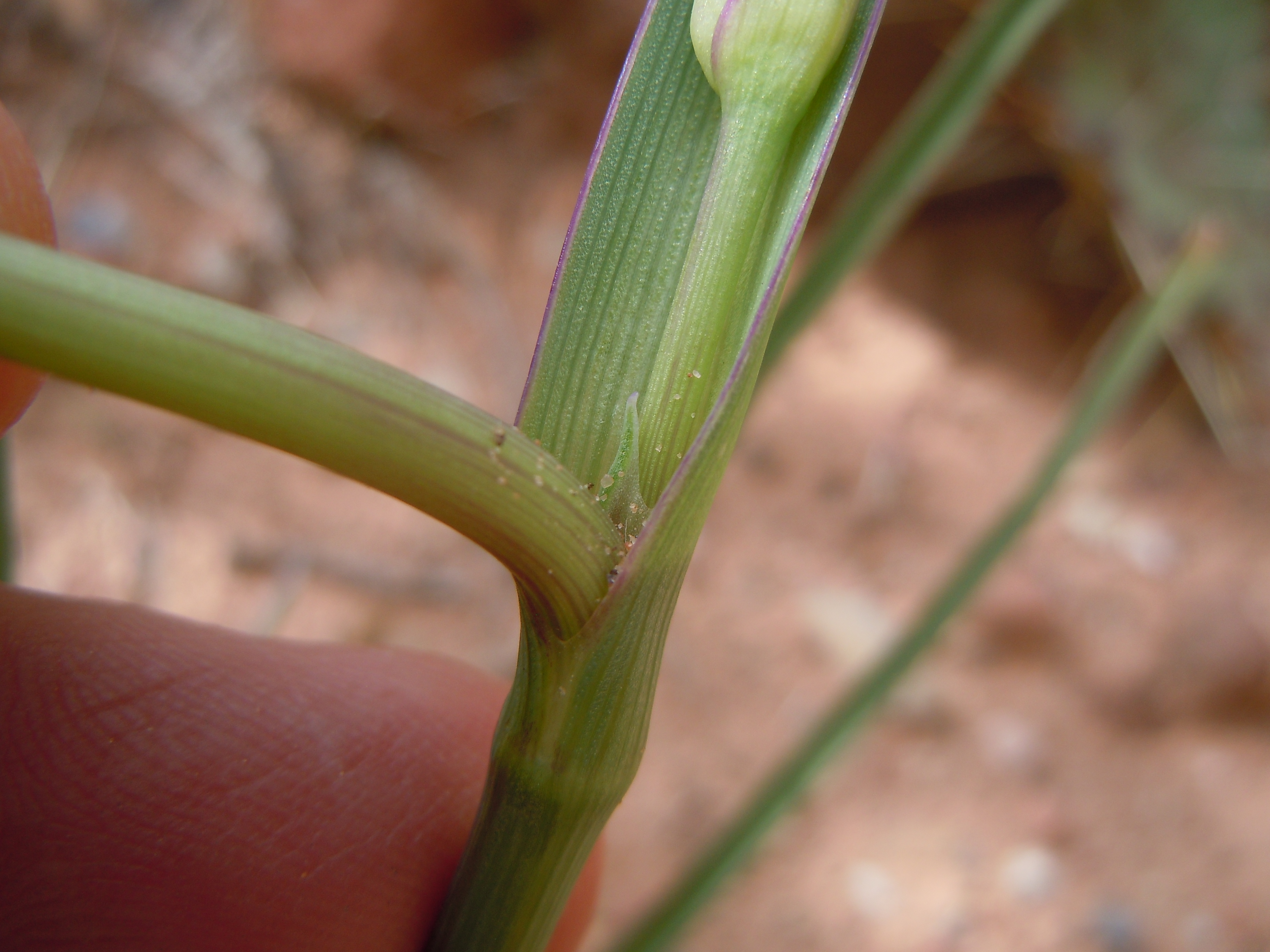

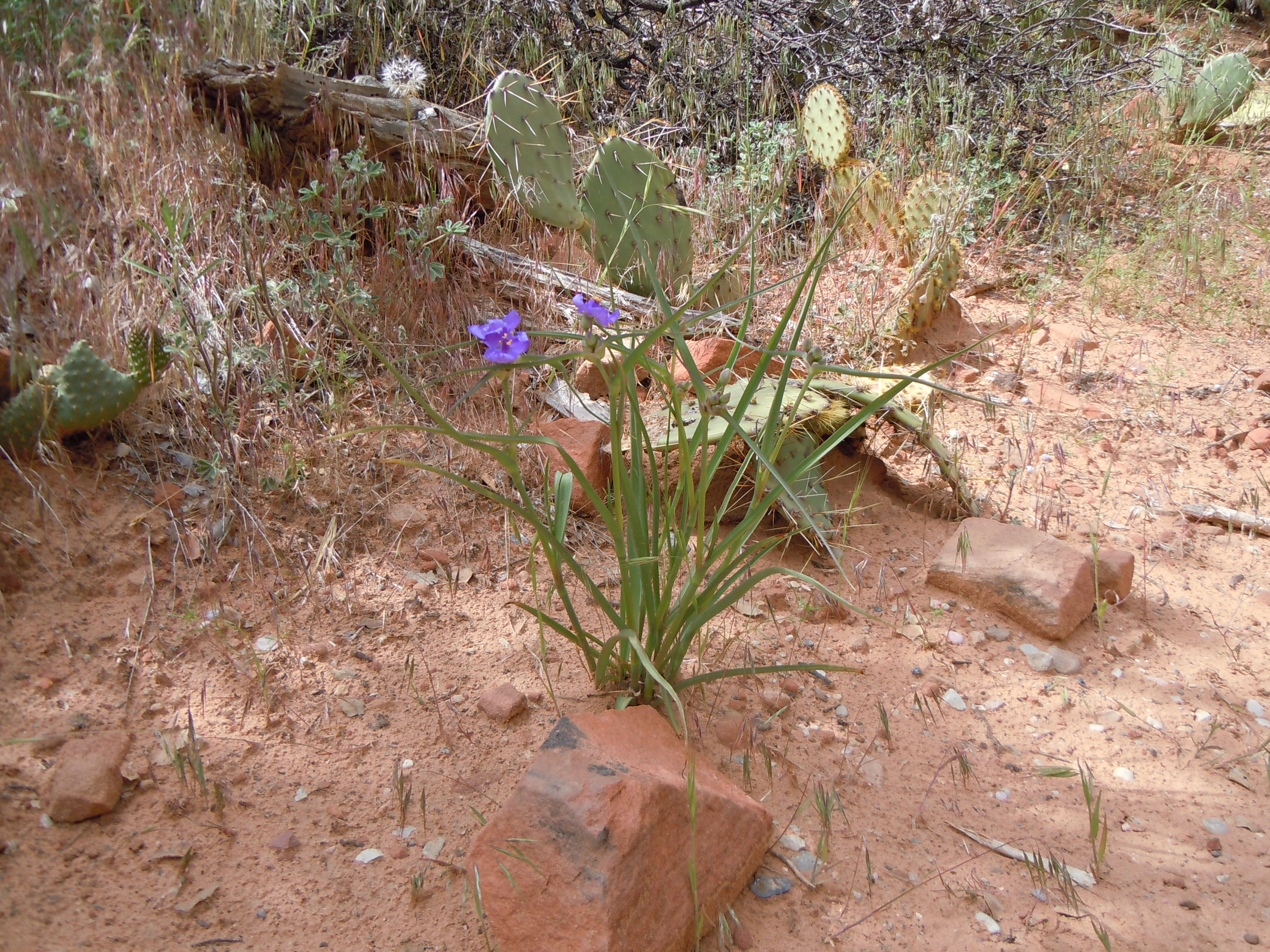

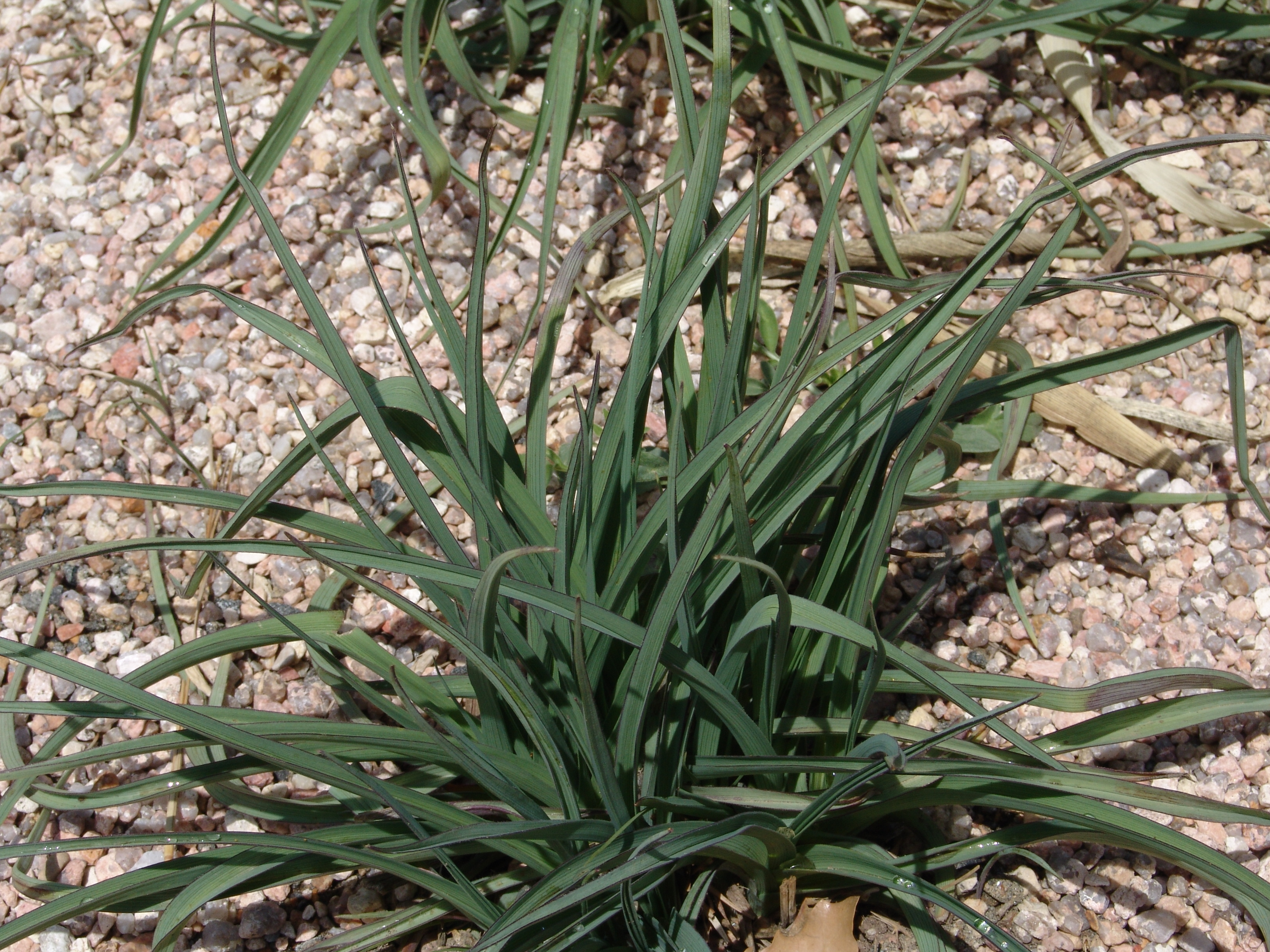

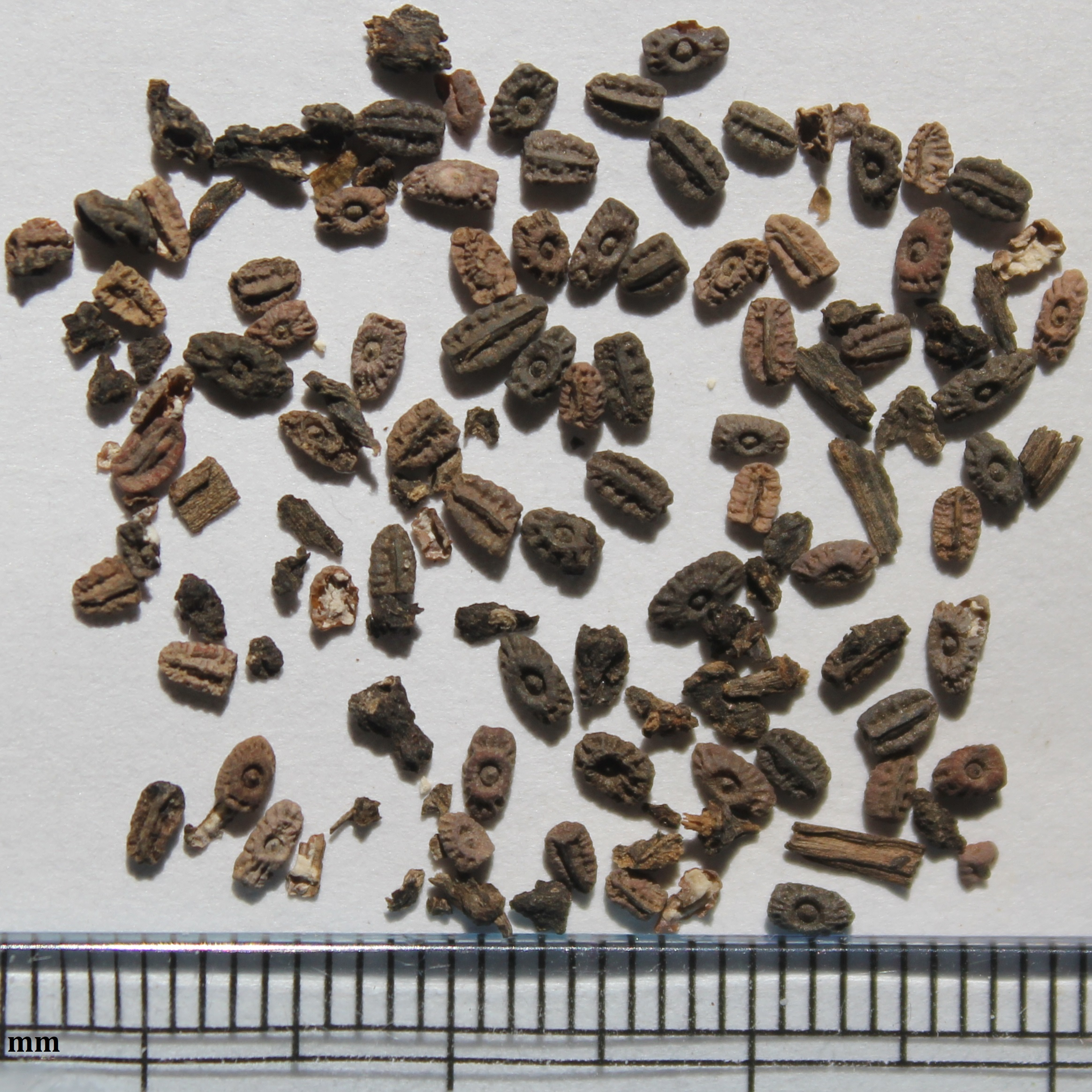
Seeds
