= Elbow, Saskatchewan =

Village in Saskatchewan, Canada

Elbow
- Village
- Village of Elbow
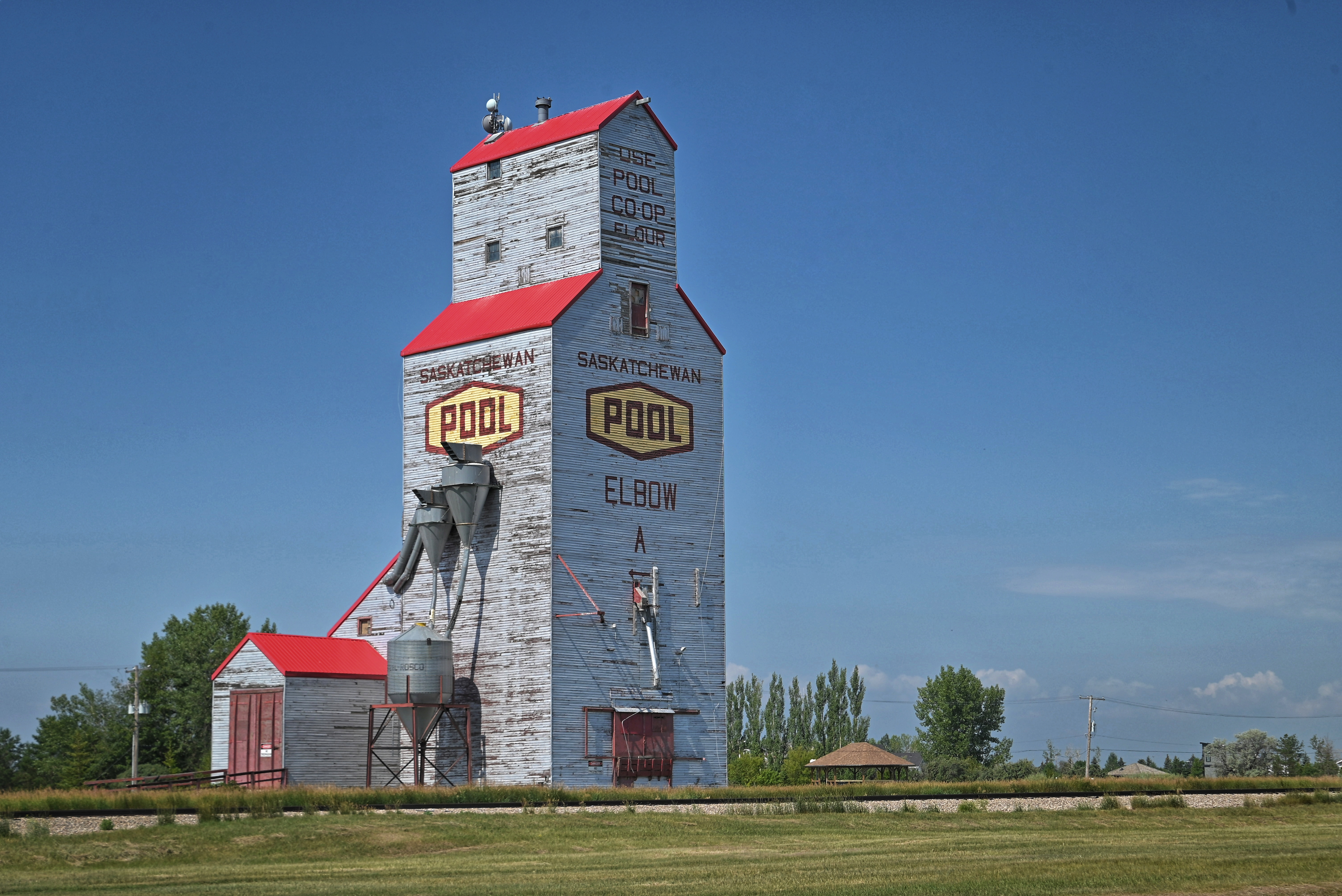
- Grain elevator in Elbow, Note: original Saskatchewan Wheat Pool logo

- Location of Elbow in Saskatchewan Elbow (Canada)
- Coordinates: 51.144°N 106.559°W
- Country: Canada
- Province: Saskatchewan
- Region: South-central
- Census division: 11
- Rural Municipality: Loreburn No. 254
- Post office Founded: 1906-04-01
- Incorporated (Village): Incorporated as a village in 1909

Government
  - Type: Municipal
  - Governing body: Elbow Village Council
  - Mayor: J.Glen Gardner
  - Administrator: Brandy Losie
  - MP: Kelly Block
  - MLA: Jim Reiter

Area
  - Total: 3.92 km^{2} (1.51 sq mi)

Population (2016)
  - Total: 337
  - Density: 86/km^{2} (220/sq mi)
- Time zone: UTC-6 (CST)
- Postal code: S0H 1J0
- Area code: 306
- Highways: Highway 19 Highway 749
- Railways: Canadian Pacific Railway
- Website: Official Website

Elbow (2016 population: 337) is a village in the Canadian province of Saskatchewan within the Rural Municipality of Loreburn No. 254 and Census Division No. 11. Elbow was founded in 1909, near what is now Lake Diefenbaker. It is 8 kilometres (5.0 mi) north-west of Mistusinne, 10 kilometres (6.2 mi) north-west of Douglas Provincial Park, and 16 kilometres (9.9 mi) south-east of Loreburn. The village got its name from its position on the elbow of the South Saskatchewan River.

Adjacent to the village is a provincial recreation site with a marina, golf course, and beach access. There is also a sod house (now a museum) and a library within Elbow.

== History ==
Elbow incorporated as a village on April 6, 1909.

== Demographics ==
Population history (1981–2016)
Year	Pop.	±%
1981	313	—
1986	323	+3.2%
1991	327	+1.2%
1996	295	−9.8%
2001	298	+1.0%
2006	294	−1.3%
2011	314	+6.8%
2016	337	+7.3%
Source: Statistics Canada via Saskatchewan Bureau of Statistics

In the 2021 Census of Population conducted by Statistics Canada, Elbow had a population of 341 living in 165 of its 246 total private dwellings, a change of 1.2% from its 2016 population of 337. With a land area of 3.96 km^{2} (1.53 sq mi), it had a population density of 86.1/km^{2} (223.0/sq mi) in 2021.

In the 2016 Census of Population, the Village of Elbow recorded a population of 337 living in 163 of its 243 total private dwellings, a 6.8% change from its 2011 population of 314. With a land area of 3.92 km^{2} (1.51 sq mi), it had a population density of 86.0/km^{2} (222.7/sq mi) in 2016.

== Elbow Harbour Recreation Site ==
Elbow Harbour Recreation Site (51.1082°N 106.6075°W) is adjacent to Elbow in the RM of Loreburn No. 254. The park is centred around Lake Diefenbaker's Elbow Harbour and has a 110-slip marina, an 18-hole golf course, and an RV campground with 60 fully serviced campsites. There is beach access, fuel, laundry facilities, a restaurant, and a grocery store.

== Climate ==
Elbow experiences a Humid continental climate (Dfb). The highest temperature ever recorded in Elbow was 43.3 °C (110 °F) on June 24, 1941. The coldest temperature ever recorded was −43.3 °C (−46 °F) on January 25, 1972.

Climate data for Elbow, 1981–2010 normals, extremes 1918–present
Month	Jan	Feb	Mar	Apr	May	Jun	Jul	Aug	Sep	Oct	Nov	Dec	Year
Record high °C (°F)	10.0 (50.0)	12.0 (53.6)	21.8 (71.2)	33.9 (93.0)	38.0 (100.4)	43.3 (109.9)	41.1 (106.0)	40.9 (105.6)	38.3 (100.9)	32.8 (91.0)	21.1 (70.0)	16.3 (61.3)	43.3 (109.9)
Mean daily maximum °C (°F)	−9.4 (15.1)	−5.1 (22.8)	1.5 (34.7)	11.5 (52.7)	17.5 (63.5)	21.8 (71.2)	25.6 (78.1)	25.2 (77.4)	19.4 (66.9)	10.5 (50.9)	0.4 (32.7)	−6.0 (21.2)	9.4 (48.9)
Daily mean °C (°F)	−14.6 (5.7)	−10.6 (12.9)	−4.1 (24.6)	4.9 (40.8)	10.4 (50.7)	15.2 (59.4)	18.3 (64.9)	17.6 (63.7)	12.0 (53.6)	4.3 (39.7)	−4.4 (24.1)	−11.0 (12.2)	3.2 (37.8)
Mean daily minimum °C (°F)	−19.7 (−3.5)	−15.9 (3.4)	−9.6 (14.7)	−1.9 (28.6)	3.2 (37.8)	8.6 (47.5)	11.0 (51.8)	9.9 (49.8)	4.6 (40.3)	−1.9 (28.6)	−9.2 (15.4)	−15.9 (3.4)	−3.1 (26.4)
Record low °C (°F)	−43.3 (−45.9)	−40.0 (−40.0)	−42.8 (−45.0)	−26.6 (−15.9)	−12.2 (10.0)	−2.8 (27.0)	0.0 (32.0)	−2.0 (28.4)	−13.3 (8.1)	−22.8 (−9.0)	−32.7 (−26.9)	−42.2 (−44.0)	−43.3 (−45.9)
Average precipitation mm (inches)	15.1 (0.59)	7.7 (0.30)	13.8 (0.54)	20.8 (0.82)	51.2 (2.02)	78.9 (3.11)	53.4 (2.10)	45.2 (1.78)	34.0 (1.34)	18.4 (0.72)	13.0 (0.51)	12.1 (0.48)	363.6 (14.31)
Average rainfall mm (inches)	1.0 (0.04)	0.7 (0.03)	4.3 (0.17)	16.7 (0.66)	50.4 (1.98)	78.9 (3.11)	53.4 (2.10)	45.2 (1.78)	33.9 (1.33)	14.9 (0.59)	3.0 (0.12)	0.8 (0.03)	303.1 (11.93)
Average snowfall cm (inches)	15.1 (5.9)	7.0 (2.8)	9.5 (3.7)	4.1 (1.6)	0.9 (0.4)	0.0 (0.0)	0.0 (0.0)	0.0 (0.0)	0.1 (0.0)	3.6 (1.4)	10.0 (3.9)	11.3 (4.4)	60.4 (23.8)
Source: Environment Canada

== See also ==
- List of communities in Saskatchewan
- List of villages in Saskatchewan
