= Danielson Provincial Park =

Provincial park in Saskatchewan, Canada

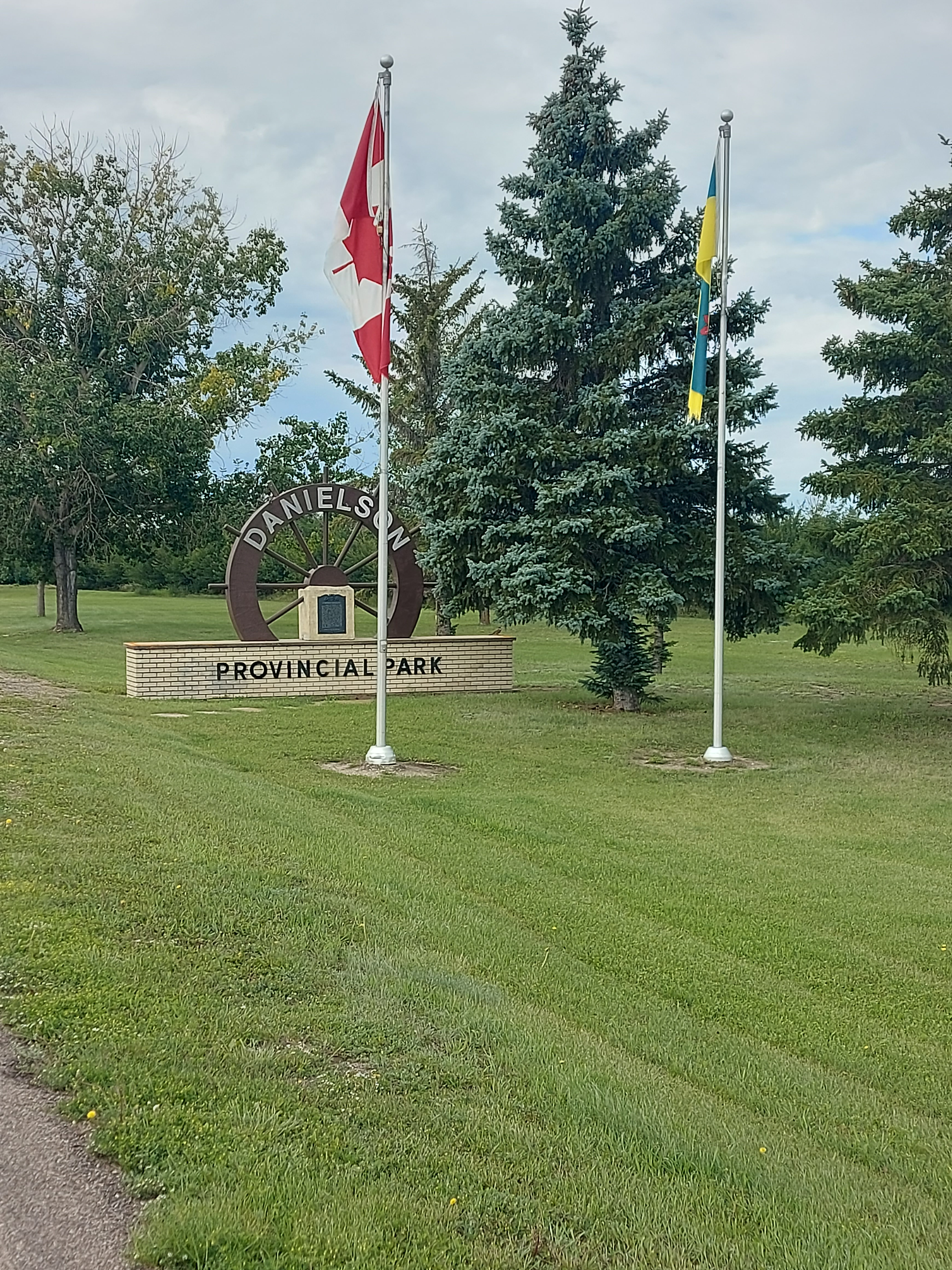
- Danielson Provincial Park

- Location within Saskatchewan Location within Canada
- Interactive map of Danielson Provincial Park
- Location: Saskatchewan, Canada
- Nearest city: Outlook
- Coordinates: 51°16′12″N 106°52′15″W
- Established: 1971
- Governing body: Sask Parks

Danielson Provincial Park is located at the northern end of Lake Diefenbaker in the southern part of the Canadian province of Saskatchewan. The park surrounds the Gardiner Dam, which was built in 1967 and is among the largest embankment dams in Canada and the world. The South Saskatchewan River flows north beyond the park, towards Outlook and Saskatoon. Saskatchewan Highways 44, 45, and 219 provide access to the park. SaskPower's Coteau Creek Hydroelectric Station is located near the park.

The park opened to the public in 1971 and was named for former MLA Gustaf Herman Danielson. It is one of three provincial parks on Lake Diefenbaker, with the other two being Douglas Provincial Park and Saskatchewan Landing Provincial Park.

Danielson Provincial Park's Visitor Centre is located between Lake Diefenbaker and Coteau Bay, and features numerous interactive displays about the Gardiner Dam and the river systems of southern Saskatchewan in addition to a café and beach.

== Attractions and amenities ==
Danielson Provincial park has a variety of attractions and amenities ranging from camping to swimming to hiking.

There are three main campgrounds plus an overflow site. The three campgrounds are Shady Lane, Bayside, and Elmview and services offered include electric hookups, potable water, washrooms, showers, and sani-dumps. The park also has a sandy beach for swimming and a boat launch. Near the beach is a picnic area and a fish cleaning station.

There are two main trails in the park. The Great Trail, which is part of the Trans Canada Trail, and the Prairie View Nature Trail.

== See also ==
- List of protected areas of Saskatchewan
- Tourism in Saskatchewan
