= Gardiner Dam =

Dam in Saskatchewan, Canada

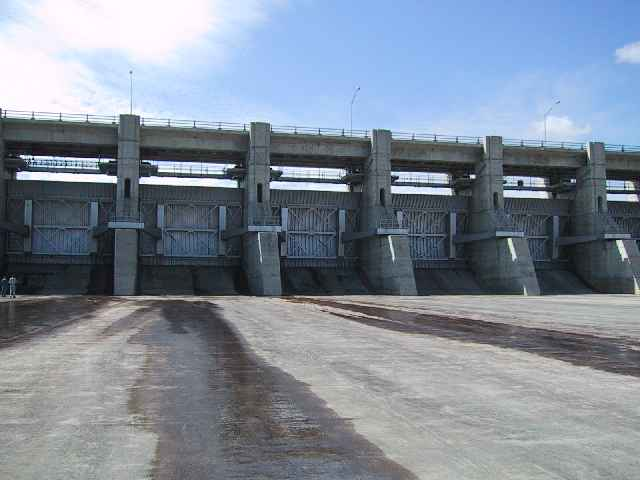
- Spillway gates of Gardiner Dam
- Interactive map of Gardiner Dam
- Official name: Gardiner Dam
- Location: RM of Coteau No. 255, Canada; RM of Loreburn No. 254, Canada
- Coordinates: 51°16′12″N 106°52′15″W
- Opening date: June 21, 1967
- Owner: Saskatchewan Watershed Authority
- Operator: Saskatchewan Watershed Authority

Dam and spillways
- Type of dam: Embankment dam
- Height: 64 m (210 ft)
- Length: 5,000 m (16,400 ft)
- Spillway type: Gated overflow
- Spillway capacity: 7,500 m^{3}/s (264,860 cu ft/s)

Reservoir
- Creates: Lake Diefenbaker
- Total capacity: 9.4 km^{3} (7,620,700 acre⋅ft)
- Catchment area: 126,000 km^{2} (49,000 sq mi)
- Maximum length: 115 km (71 mi)

Power Station
- Turbines: 3x 62 MW at Coteau Creek Hydroelectric Station
- Installed capacity: 186 MW
- Annual generation: 1000 GWh

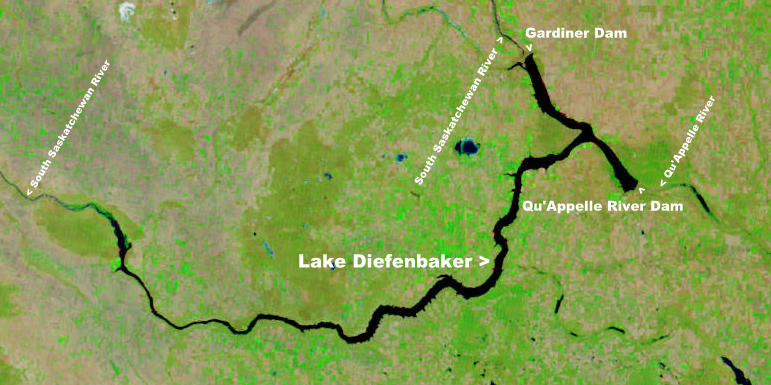
NASA satellite image of Lake Diefenbaker showing the Qu'Appelle River Dam at the south-east end and the Gardiner Dam at the north-east end

The Gardiner Dam on the South Saskatchewan River in Saskatchewan is the third largest embankment dam in Canada and one of the largest embankment dams in the world. Construction on Gardiner Dam and the smaller Qu'Appelle River Dam was started in 1959 and completed in 1967, creating Lake Diefenbaker upstream and diverting a considerable portion of the South Saskatchewan's flow into the Qu'Appelle River. The dam rises 64 metres (209 feet) in height, is almost 5 km (3.1 mi) long and has a width of 1.5 km (0.93 mi) at its base with a volume of 65,000,000 cubic meters. The dam is owned and operated by the Saskatchewan Water Security Agency.

Two main gravity fed aqueducts (canals) from the lake were built in 1967 as part of the South Saskatchewan River Project to supply water to downstream reservoirs for irrigation, drinking water, and industrial uses. The Westside Irrigation Project supplies water to the west side of the South Saskatchewan River and the Eastside Irrigation Project supplies water to the east side of the South Saskatchewan River. Notable reservoirs on the Eastside Irrigation Project include Broderick Reservoir, Brightwater Reservoir, Blackstrap Lake, Bradwell Reservoir, and Zelma Reservoir. On July 2, 2020, Premier Scott Moe announced a 10-year, $4 billion irrigation expansion project that would increase the amount of land irrigated from Lake Diefenbaker to up to 500,000 acres. Phase one and two of the project will rehabilitate and expand the existing Westside Irrigation canal system. Phase three will see a system built south from the Qu'Appelle River Dam called the Qu’Appelle South Irrigation Project.

Danielson Provincial Park has property on both sides of the dam. On the north-east end is the RV park and on the south-west end is a beach, restaurant, and guided tours of the Coteau Creek Hydroelectric Station. The park was named after Gustaf Herman Danielson (former Saskatchewan Liberal Party MLA).

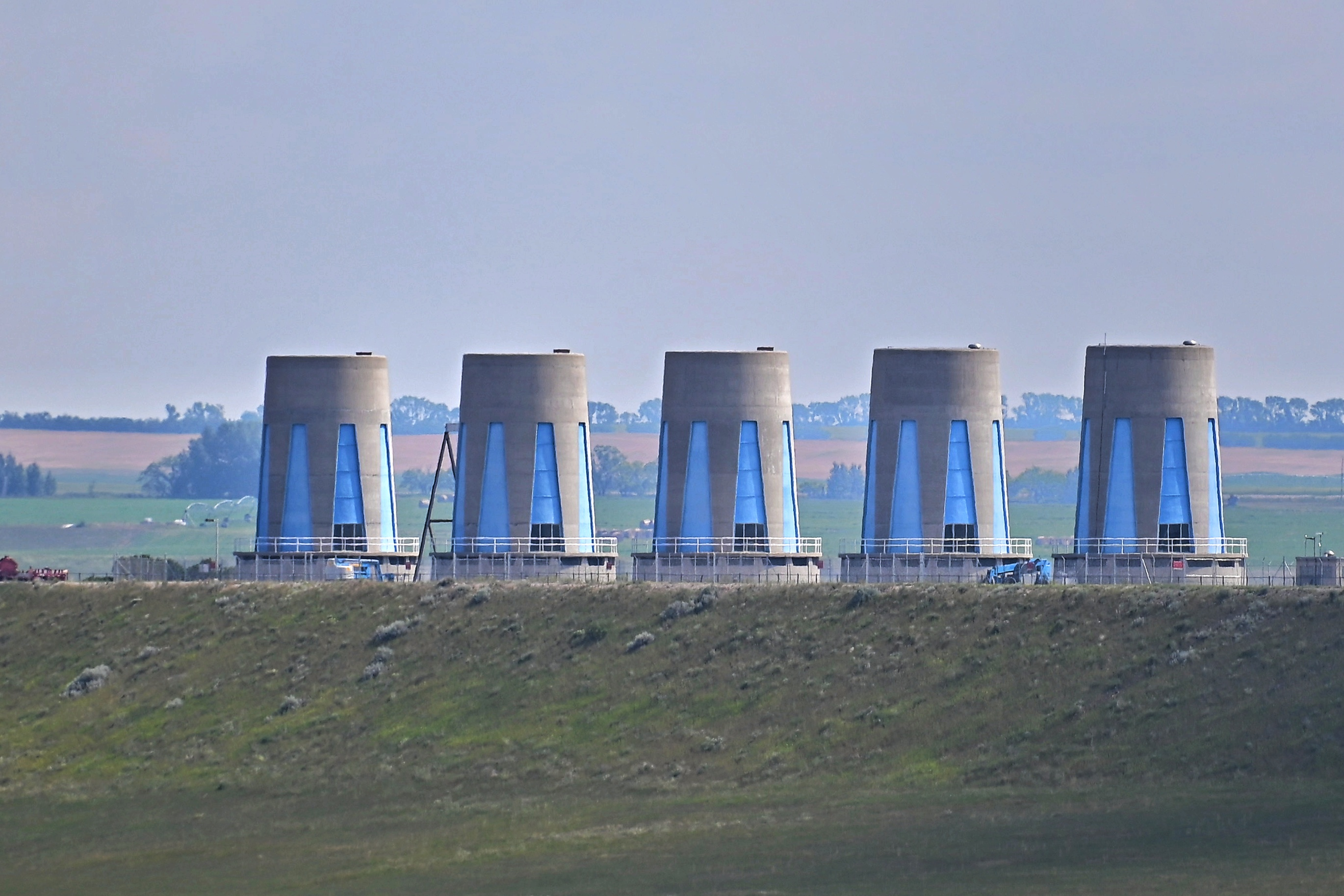
Gate Control Structures

An integrated power generating plant, SaskPower's Coteau Creek Hydroelectric Station, produces a net 186 MW of electricity from three 62 MW generators. Highway 44 crosses the river atop the dam.

The dam is named for a former Premier of Saskatchewan and longtime federal cabinet minister, James G. Gardiner.

== See also ==
- List of dams in Saskatchewan
