= Rowletta =

Locality in Canada

Coordinates: 50.612°N 105.978°W

Rowletta is a locality in the Rural Municipality of Marquis No. 191, Saskatchewan, Canada. It is located about 5 km west of Highway 643 on Range Road 35 and approximately 10 km northwest of the Village of Caronport on the former Grand Trunk Pacific/(Canadian National Railways) Central Butte Subdivision. Rowletta Civic Centre is located to the south of Rowletta at the intersection of Township Road 190 and Range Road 292.

== See also ==
- List of communities in Saskatchewan
