= Sun Valley, Saskatchewan =

Sun Valley
- Resort village
- Resort Village of Sun Valley
- Location within Saskatchewan
- Coordinates: 50.659°N 105.543°W
- Country: Canada
- Province: Saskatchewan
- Census division: 7
- Rural municipality: RM of Marquis No. 191
- Incorporated: January 1, 1985

Government
  - Mayor: Shannon Pearce
  - Governing body: Resort Village Council
  - Administrator: Melinda Huebner

Area (2016)
  - Land: 2.33 km^{2} (0.90 sq mi)

Population (2016)
  - Total: 118
  - Density: 50.6/km^{2} (131/sq mi)
- Time zone: CST
  - Summer (DST): CST
- Area codes: 306 and 639
- Waterway(s): Buffalo Pound Lake

Sun Valley (2016 population: 118) is a resort village in the Canadian province of Saskatchewan within Census Division No. 7. It is on the shores of Buffalo Pound Lake in the Rural Municipality of Marquis No. 191. It is south of the Resort Village of South Lake.

== History ==
Sun Valley incorporated as a resort village on January 1, 1985.

== Demographics ==
Population history (1981–2016)
Year	Pop.	±%
1981		—
1986	55	—
1991	84	+52.7%
1996	95	+13.1%
2001	111	+16.8%
2006	128	+15.3%
2011	80	−37.5%
2016	118	+47.5%
Source: Statistics Canada via Saskatchewan Bureau of Statistics

In the 2021 Census of Population conducted by Statistics Canada, Sun Valley had a population of 154 living in 73 of its 185 total private dwellings, a change of 30.5% from its 2016 population of 118. With a land area of 2.03 km^{2} (0.78 sq mi), it had a population density of 75.9/km^{2} (196.5/sq mi) in 2021.

In the 2016 Census of Population conducted by Statistics Canada, the Resort Village of Sun Valley recorded a population of 118 living in 54 of its 161 total private dwellings, a 47.5% change from its 2011 population of 80. With a land area of 2.33 km^{2} (0.90 sq mi), it had a population density of 50.6/km^{2} (131.2/sq mi) in 2016.

== Government ==
The Resort Village of Sun Valley is governed by an elected municipal council and an appointed administrator. The mayor is Shannon Pearce and its administrator is Melinda Huebner.

== See also ==
- List of communities in Saskatchewan
- List of municipalities in Saskatchewan
- List of resort villages in Saskatchewan
- List of villages in Saskatchewan
- List of summer villages in Alberta
