= List of municipalities in Saskatchewan =

Location of Saskatchewan in Canada

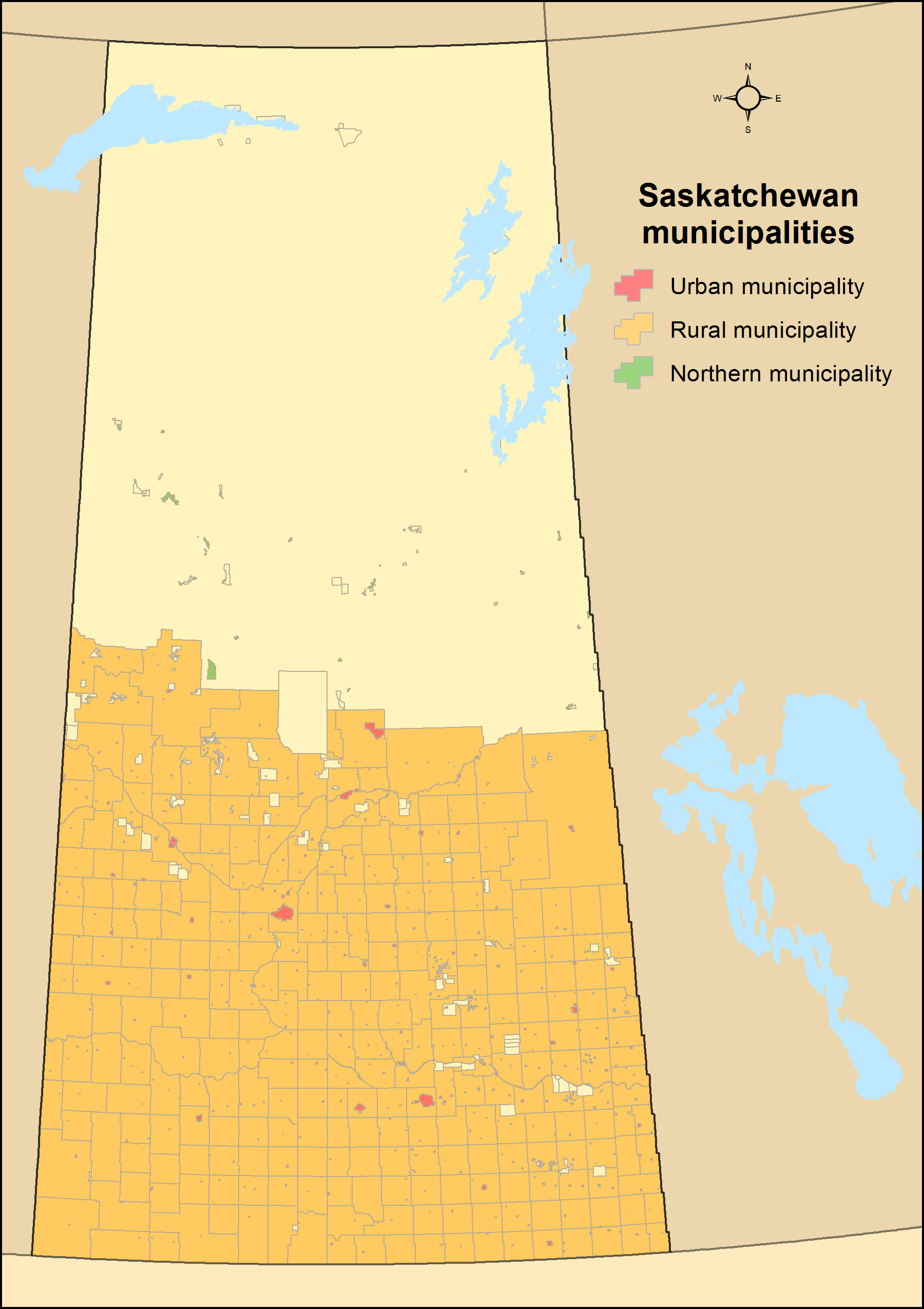
Distribution of Saskatchewan's 466 urban, 296 rural and 24 northern municipalities (2013)

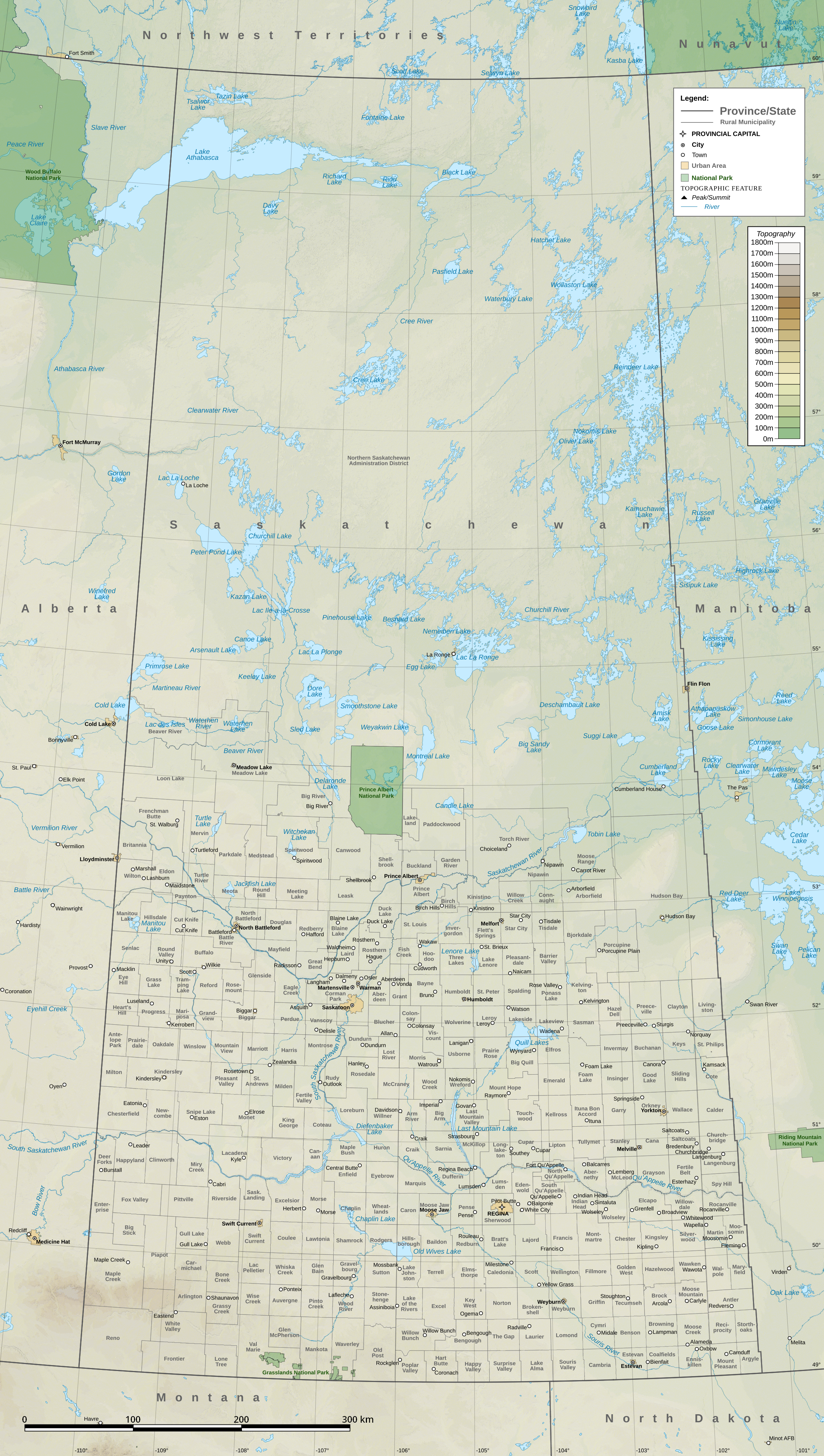
A topographic map of Saskatchewan, showing rural municipalities, some select urban municipalities, and natural features

Saskatchewan is the sixth-most populous Canadian province with 1,132,505 residents as of 2021 and is the fifth-largest in land area at 588,244 km^{2} (227,122 sq mi). In 2021, Saskatchewan's 774 municipalities covered 52.1% of the province's land mass and were home to 94.9% of its population. (Note: The remaining 5.2% of Saskatchewan's population resides on Indian reserves, Indian settlements, the vast unincorporated portions of the Northern Saskatchewan Administration District and other unincorporated areas. Together, they occupy the remaining 151.5% of the province's land mass.) These 774 municipalities are local government "creatures of provincial jurisdiction" with natural persons power. One of the key purposes of Saskatchewan's municipalities are "to provide services, facilities and other things that, in the opinion of council, are necessary or desirable for all or a part of the municipality". Other purposes are to: "provide good government"; "develop and maintain a safe and viable community"; "foster economic, social and environmental well-being" and "provide wise stewardship of public assets."

The Government of Saskatchewan's Ministry of Municipal Relations recognizes three general types of municipalities and seven sub-types – urban municipalities (cities, towns, villages and resort villages), rural municipalities and northern municipalities (northern towns, northern villages and northern hamlets). Cities are formed under the provincial authority of The Cities Act, which was enacted in 2002. Towns, villages, resort villages and rural municipalities are formed under the authority of The Municipalities Act, enacted in 2005. The three sub-types of northern municipalities are formed under the authority of The Northern Municipalities Act, enacted in 2010. As provincial laws, these three acts were passed by the Legislative Assembly of Saskatchewan with royal assent granted by the Lieutenant Governor.

Of Saskatchewan's 774 municipalities, 454 of them are urban municipalities (16 cities, 147 towns, 250 villages and 41 resort villages), 296 are rural municipalities and 24 are northern municipalities (2 northern towns, 11 northern villages and 11 northern hamlets). The Cities Act, The Municipalities Act and The Northern Municipalities Act stipulate governance of these municipalities. Saskatchewan's Ministry of Municipal Relations is responsible for providing provincial programs and services to municipalities.

In 2021, just over 43% of Saskatchewan's population resided in its two largest cities. Saskatoon, the largest city, is home to 24% of the province's population (266,141 residents), while Regina, Saskatchewan's capital city, is home to 20% (226,404 residents). The resort villages of Krydor and Waldron are tied as Saskatchewan's smallest municipalities by population with 15 people each. The largest municipality by land area is the Rural Municipality of Hudson Bay No. 394 at 12,399.12 km^{2} (4,787.33 mi^{2}), while the smallest by land area is the Resort Village of Greig Lake at 0.10 km^{2} (0.039 mi^{2}).

== Urban municipalities ==
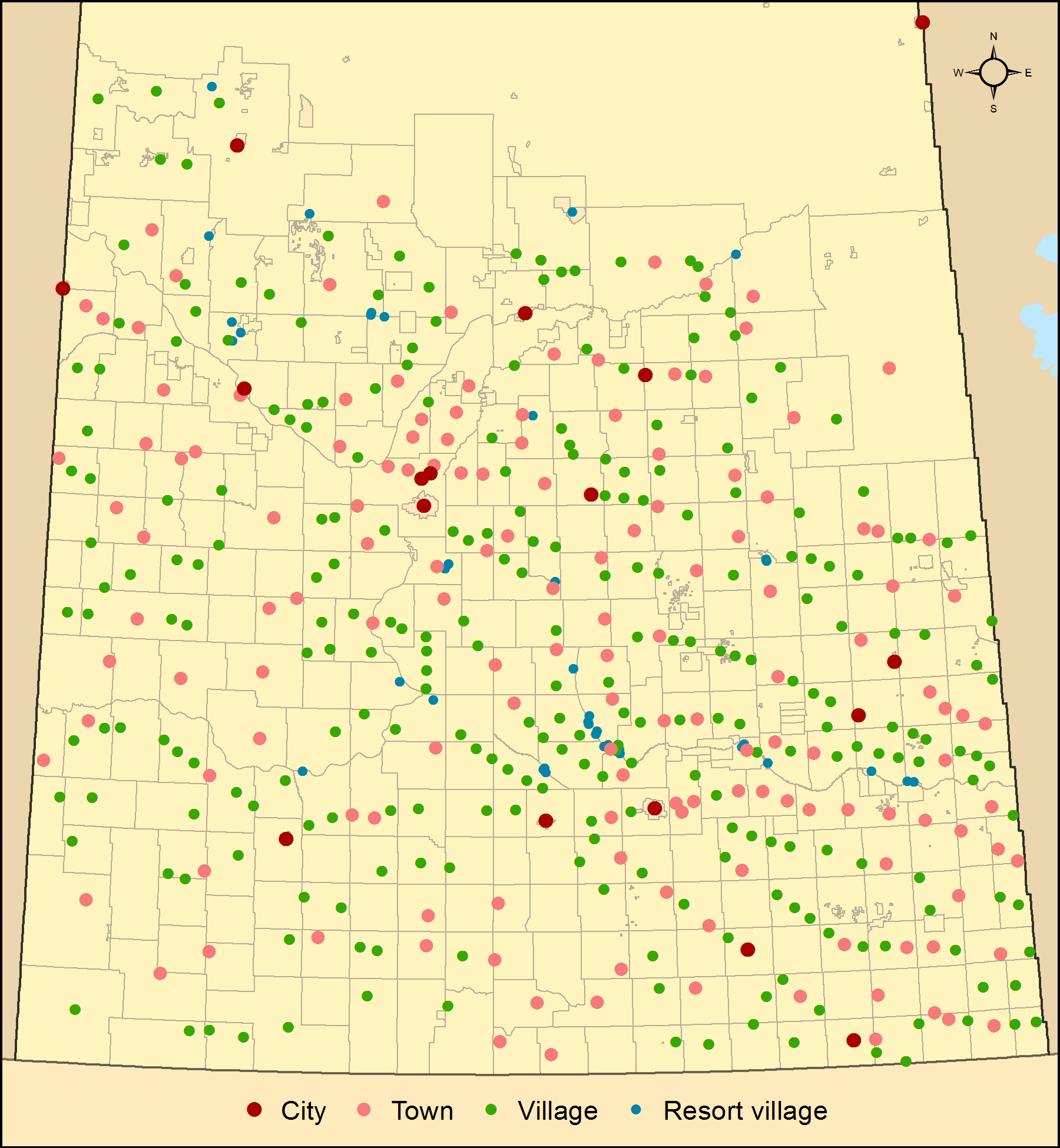
Distribution of Saskatchewan's 16 cities, 146 towns, 264 villages and 40 resort villages (2013)

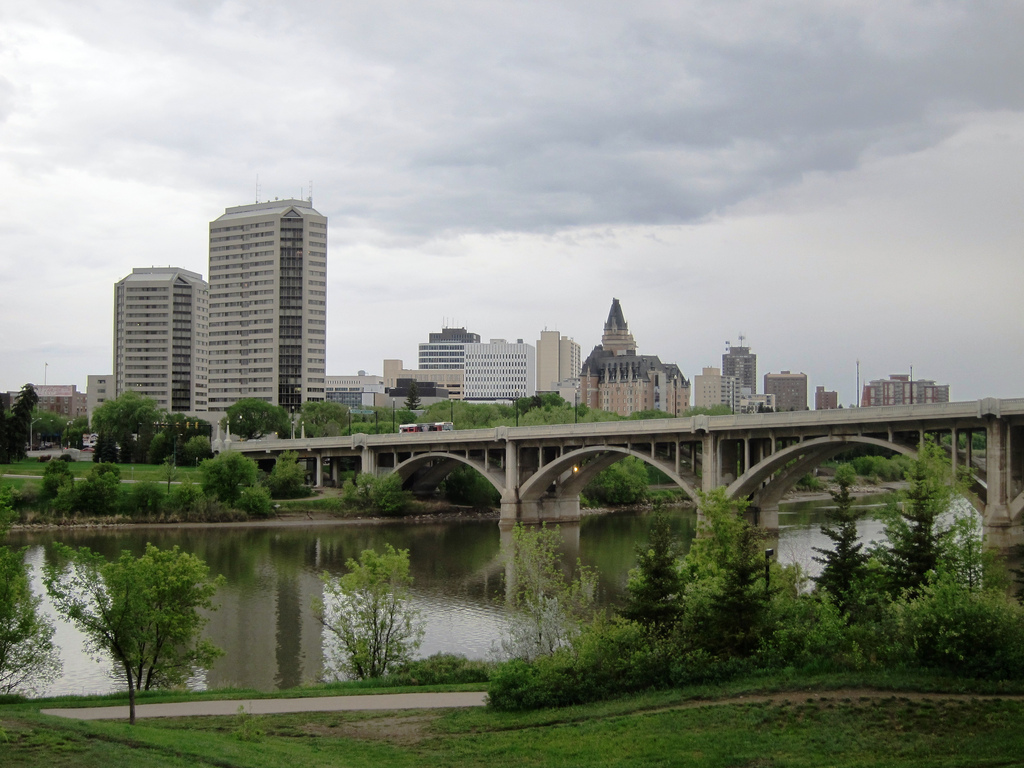
Downtown Saskatoon, the largest city in Saskatchewan

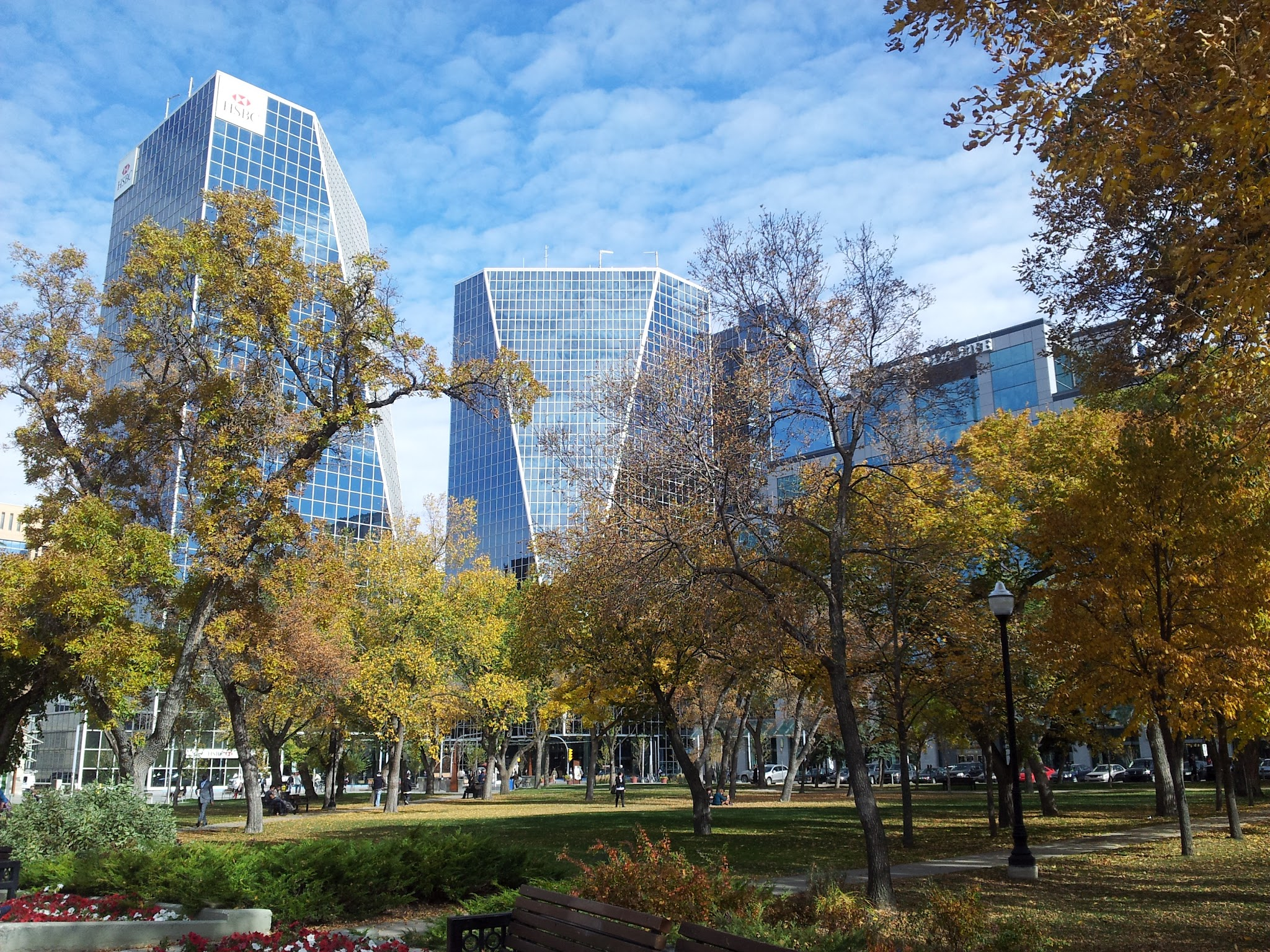
Downtown Regina, Saskatchewan, Saskatchewan's capital and second largest city

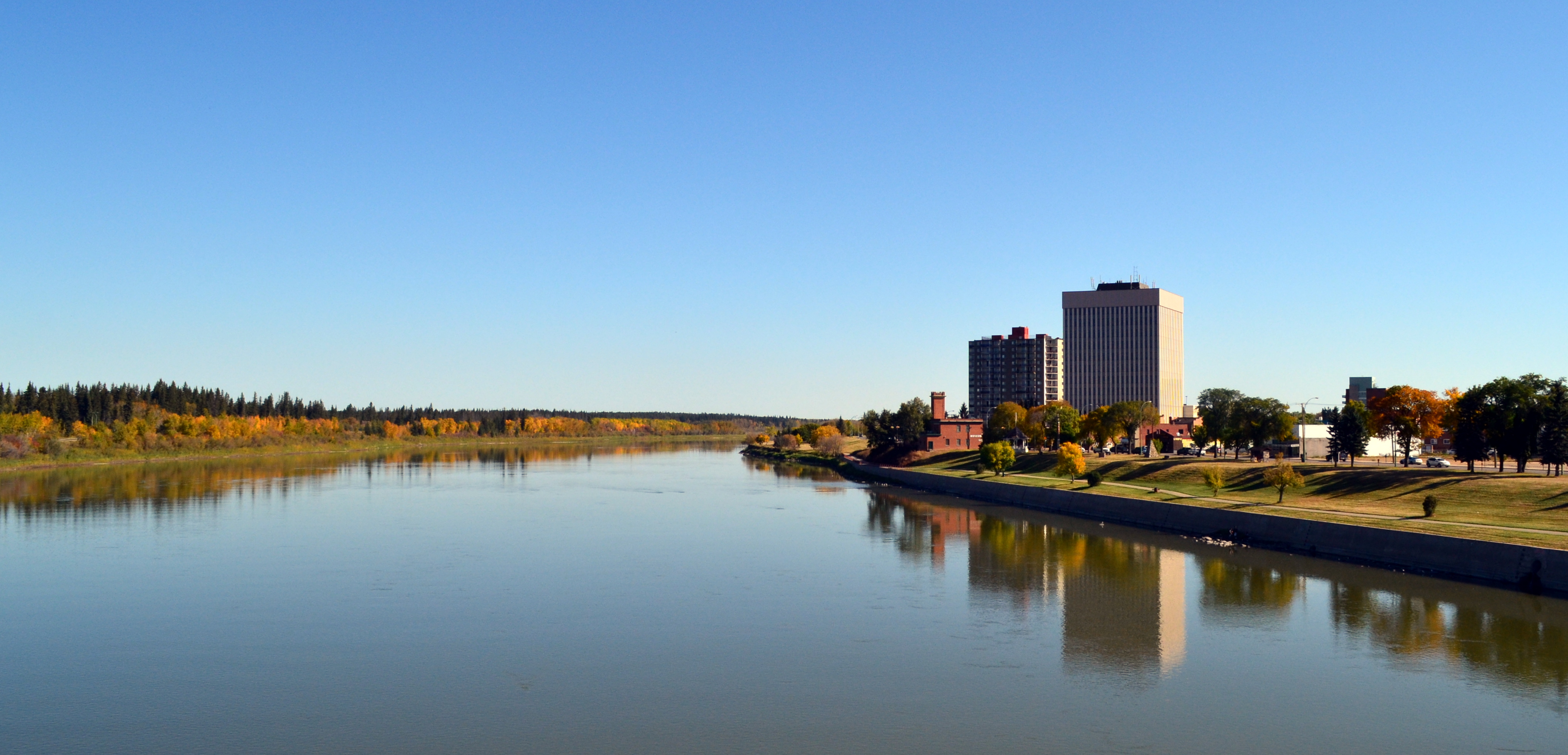
Skyline of Prince Albert, Saskatchewan

As of 2020, Saskatchewan has 454 urban municipalities, which includes the sub-types of cities, towns, villages and resort villages.

=== Cities ===
A city can be created from a town by Saskatchewan's Minister of Municipal Relations by ministerial order via section 39 of The Cities Act if it has a population of 5,000 or more and the change in status is requested by the town council. A city does not automatically revert to town status if the population drops below 5,000; this only occurs if the city council requests it, the majority of electors vote to revert to town status, or the minister is of the opinion that the reversion to town status is in the public interest. Melville retains its city status despite dropping below the 5,000 population threshold in the 1990s.

Saskatchewan has 16 cities including Lloydminster, which traverses the provincial border with Alberta. Unlike Lloydminster, Flin Flon, which traverses the provincial border with Manitoba, is not officially recognized as a city. Saskatchewan's 16 cities had a cumulative population of 689,475 in the 2021 Census. Saskatchewan's largest and smallest cities are Saskatoon and Melville with populations of 266,141 and 4,493. The largest and smallest city by land area are Saskatoon and Meadow Lake with 226.56 km^{2} (87.48 mi^{2}) and 12.37 km^{2} (4.78 mi^{2}).

Cities are governed by a council of six councillors and a mayor, although the council may vary the number of councillors to any even number that is at least two. A council may designate a person under the age of 18 years a "youth member" to participate in its session, but such a member is not a councillor and may not vote. A city may by bylaw be divided into wards to elect its council. The mayor presides over the council as a member and is ex officio a member of every committee of the council unless the council determines otherwise.

=== Towns ===
A town can be created from a village or resort village by Saskatchewan's Minister of Municipal Relations by ministerial order via section 52 of The Municipalities Act if it has a population of 500 or more. Upon reaching a population of 5,000, a town's council may request the minister to change its status to a city in accordance with section 39 of The Cities Act. Should a town's population decline to less than 500, its council may request its status be reverted to village or resort village status.

Saskatchewan has 147 towns that had a cumulative population of 145,995 in the 2021 Census. Saskatchewan's largest and smallest towns are Nipawin and Fleming with populations of 4,570 and 70. The largest and smallest town by land area are Battleford and Francis with 23.26 km^{2} (8.98 mi^{2}) and 0.62 km^{2} (0.24 mi^{2}).

Towns, villages, and resort villages are all governed by a council with a mayor and two councillors, although they may vary that number to any even number at least two unless they are divided into wards.

=== Villages ===
A village can be created from an organized hamlet by Saskatchewan's Minister of Municipal Relations by ministerial order via section 51 of The Municipalities Act if it meets four requirements. It must have:

- been an organized hamlet for three or more years;
- a population of 300 or more;
- 150 or more dwellings or businesses; and
- a taxable assessment of at least $30 million.

Upon reaching a population of 500, a village's council may request the minister to change its status to a town in accordance with section 52 of The Municipalities Act.

Saskatchewan has 250 villages that had a cumulative population of 40,447 in the 2021 Census. Saskatchewan's largest village is Caronport with a population of 1,033, while Krydor, and Waldron are all tied as the province's smallest villages with populations of 15 each. The largest and smallest villages by land area are Christopher Lake and Minton with 4.59 km^{2} (1.77 mi^{2}) and 0.25 km^{2} (0.097 mi^{2}).

=== Resort villages ===
Like a village, a resort village can be created from an organized hamlet by Saskatchewan's Minister of Municipal Relations by ministerial order via section 51 of The Municipalities Act if it has:

- been an organized hamlet for three or more years;
- can demonstrate with a municipal census of the organized hamlet a permanent and seasonal population of 300 if the most recent national census shows a population of at least 100;
- 150 or more dwellings or businesses;
- a taxable assessment of at least $35 million;
- and is predominantly of a resort nature

Upon reaching a population of 500, a resort village's council may request the minister to change its status to a town in accordance with section 52 of The Municipalities Act.

Saskatchewan has 41 resort villages that had a cumulative population of 6,578 in the 2021 Census. Saskatchewan's largest resort village by population is Candle Lake with 1,160 inhabitants while the smallest is Sunset Cove with a population of 21. The largest and smallest resort municipalities by land area are Candle Lake and Greig Lake with 62.93 km^{2} (24.30 mi^{2}) and 0.010 km^{2} (0.0039 mi^{2}).

=== List of urban municipalities ===
List of urban municipalities in Saskatchewan
Name	Status	Rural municipality (Note: This refers to the rural municipality that surrounds the urban municipality.)	Incorporation date	2021 Census of Population						
Name	Status	Rural municipality	Incorporation date	Population (2021)	Population (2016)	Change	Land area		Population density	
Name	Status	Rural municipality	Incorporation date	Population (2021)	Population (2016)	Change	km^{2}	sq mi	/km^{2}	/sq mi
Estevan	City	Estevan No. 5	March 1, 1957	10,851	11,483	−5.5%	18.30	7.07	593.0	1,536
Flin Flon	City	—	April 4, 1952	159	203	−21.7%	2.01	0.78	79.1	205
Humboldt	City	Humboldt No. 370	November 7, 2000	6,033	5,869	+2.8%	13.30	5.14	453.6	1,175
Lloydminster	City	Britannia No. 502 and Wilton No. 472	January 1, 1958	11,843	11,765	+0.7%	18.06	6.97	655.8	1,699
Martensville	City	Corman Park No. 344	November 3, 2009	10,549	9,655	+9.3%	13.56	5.24	777.9	2,015
Meadow Lake	City	Meadow Lake No. 588	November 3, 2009	5,322	5,344	−0.4%	12.37	4.78	430.2	1,114
Melfort	City	Star City No. 428	September 2, 1980	5,955	5,992	−0.6%	14.73	5.69	404.3	1,047
Melville	City	Cana No. 214	August 1, 1960	4,493	4,562	−1.5%	14.78	5.71	304.0	787
Moose Jaw	City	Moose Jaw No. 161	November 20, 1903	33,665	33,910	−0.7%	65.81	25.41	511.5	1,325
North Battleford	City	North Battleford No. 437	May 1, 1913	13,836	14,315	−3.3%	33.55	12.95	412.4	1,068
Prince Albert	City	Prince Albert No. 461	October 8, 1904	37,756	35,926	+5.1%	67.17	25.93	562.1	1,456
Regina	City	Sherwood No. 159	June 19, 1903	226,404	215,106	+5.3%	178.81	69.04	1,266.2	3,279
Saskatoon	City	Corman Park No. 344	May 26, 1906	266,141	247,201	+7.7%	226.56	87.48	1,174.7	3,042
Swift Current	City	Swift Current No. 137	January 15, 1914	16,750	16,604	+0.9%	29.30	11.31	571.7	1,481
Warman	City	Corman Park No. 344	October 24, 2012	12,419	11,020	+12.7%	13.10	5.06	948.0	2,455
Weyburn	City	Weyburn No. 67	September 1, 1913	11,019	10,870	+1.4%	19.03	7.35	579.0	1,500
Yorkton	City	Orkney No. 244	February 1, 1928	16,280	16,343	−0.4%	36.19	13.97	449.8	1,165
Aberdeen	Town	Aberdeen No. 373	November 1, 1988	716	662	+8.2%	1.96	0.76	365.3	946
Alameda	Town	Moose Creek No. 33	April 15, 1907	345	369	−6.5%	2.53	0.98	136.4	353
Allan	Town	Bayne No. 371	December 1, 1965	625	644	−3.0%	1.80	0.69	347.2	899
Arborfield	Town	Arborfield No. 456	June 1, 1950	285	312	−8.7%	0.87	0.34	327.6	848
Arcola	Town	Brock No. 64	November 20, 1903	636	657	−3.2%	3.46	1.34	183.8	476
Asquith	Town	Vanscoy No. 345	August 15, 1908	624	639	−2.3%	1.37	0.53	455.5	1,180
Assiniboia	Town	Lake of the Rivers No. 72	October 1, 1913	2,333	2,424	−3.8%	3.68	1.42	634.0	1,642
Balcarres	Town	Abernethy No. 186	January 1, 1951	616	587	+4.9%	1.62	0.63	380.2	985
Balgonie	Town	Edenwold No. 158	September 1, 1907	1,756	1,765	−0.5%	4.76	1.84	368.9	955
Battleford	Town	Battle River No. 438	June 15, 1904	4,400	4,429	−0.7%	23.26	8.98	189.2	490
Bengough	Town	Bengough No. 40	April 1, 1958	332	332	0.0%	1.12	0.43	296.4	768
Bienfait	Town	Coalfields No. 4	March 1, 1957	668	762	−12.3%	3.05	1.18	219.0	567
Big River	Town	Big River No. 555	October 1, 1966	666	700	−4.9%	2.68	1.03	248.5	644
Biggar	Town	Biggar No. 347	November 1, 1911	2,133	2,226	−4.2%	15.37	5.93	138.8	359
Birch Hills	Town	Birch Hills No. 460	August 1, 1960	1,066	1,033	+3.2%	2.39	0.92	446.0	1,155
Blaine Lake	Town	Blaine Lake No. 434	March 1, 1954	509	499	+2.0%	1.86	0.72	273.7	709
Bredenbury	Town	Saltcoats No. 213	May 1, 1913	386	372	+3.8%	4.61	1.78	83.7	217
Broadview	Town	Elcapo No. 154	May 15, 1907	541	552	−2.0%	2.82	1.09	191.8	497
Bruno	Town	Bayne No. 371	January 1, 1962	604	611	−1.1%	0.94	0.36	642.6	1,664
Burstall	Town	Deer Forks No. 232	November 1, 1976	302	278	+8.6%	1.09	0.42	277.1	718
Cabri	Town	Riverside No. 168	April 16, 1917	413	390	+5.9%	1.36	0.53	303.7	787
Canora	Town	Good Lake No. 274	November 1, 1910	2,092	2,024	+3.4%	7.35	2.84	284.6	737
Carlyle	Town	Antler No. 61	January 1, 1906	1,524	1,508	+1.1%	5.41	2.09	281.7	730
Carnduff	Town	Mount Pleasant No. 2	August 12, 1905	1,150	1,099	+4.6%	2.61	1.01	440.6	1,141
Carrot River	Town	Moose Range No. 486	April 1, 1948	946	973	−2.8%	1.75	0.68	540.6	1,400
Central Butte	Town	Enfield No. 194	July 1, 1967	416	372	+11.8%	2.10	0.81	198.1	513
Choiceland	Town	Torch River No. 488	January 1, 1979	342	359	−4.7%	1.06	0.41	322.6	836
Churchbridge	Town	Churchbridge No. 211	March 1, 1964	866	896	−3.3%	2.57	0.99	337.0	873
Colonsay	Town	Colonsay No. 342	January 1, 1977	446	451	−1.1%	2.40	0.93	185.8	481
Coronach	Town	Hart Butte No. 11	November 1, 1978	612	643	−4.8%	2.34	0.90	261.5	677
Craik	Town	Craik No. 222	August 1, 1907	405	392	+3.3%	3.08	1.19	131.5	341
Cudworth	Town	Hoodoo No. 401	October 1, 1961	772	814	−5.2%	2.12	0.82	364.2	943
Cupar	Town	Cupar No. 218	January 1, 1961	598	564	+6.0%	0.86	0.33	695.3	1,801
Cut Knife	Town	Cut Knife No. 439	August 1, 1968	547	573	−4.5%	1.88	0.73	291.0	754
Dalmeny	Town	Corman Park No. 344	April 1, 1983	1,766	1,826	−3.3%	3.28	1.27	538.4	1,394
Davidson	Town	Arm River No. 252	November 15, 1906	1,044	1,048	−0.4%	4.05	1.56	257.8	668
Delisle	Town	Vanscoy No. 345	November 1, 1913	1,024	1,038	−1.3%	3.33	1.29	307.5	796
Duck Lake	Town	Duck Lake No. 463	November 1, 1911	579	569	+1.8%	2.38	0.92	243.3	630
Dundurn	Town	Dundurn No. 314	November 1, 1980	675	611	+10.5%	1.48	0.57	456.1	1,181
Eastend	Town	White Valley No. 49	March 15, 1920	607	503	+20.7%	2.61	1.01	232.6	602
Eatonia	Town	Chesterfield No. 261	January 1, 1954	498	524	−5.0%	1.60	0.62	311.3	806
Elrose	Town	Monet No. 257	February 1, 1951	470	496	−5.2%	2.89	1.12	162.6	421
Esterhazy	Town	Fertile Belt No. 183	March 1, 1957	2,345	2,502	−6.3%	5.56	2.15	421.8	1,092
Eston	Town	Snipe Lake No. 259	December 1, 1928	972	1,061	−8.4%	2.65	1.02	366.8	950
Fleming	Town	Moosomin No. 121	June 15, 1907	70	84	−16.7%	1.89	0.73	37.0	96
Foam Lake	Town	Foam Lake No. 276	March 1, 1924	1,183	1,141	+3.7%	6.04	2.33	195.9	507
Fort Qu'Appelle	Town	North Qu'Appelle No. 187	January 1, 1951	1,972	2,042	−3.4%	5.09	1.97	387.4	1,003
Francis	Town	Francis No. 127	September 24, 1906	182	217	−16.1%	0.62	0.24	293.5	760
Govan	Town	Last Mountain Valley No. 250	November 1, 1911	200	194	+3.1%	1.27	0.49	157.5	408
Grand Coulee	Town	Sherwood No. 159	October 26, 2016	606	649	−6.6%	1.74	0.67	348.3	902
Gravelbourg	Town	Gravelbourg No. 104	November 1, 1916	986	1,083	−9.0%	3.21	1.24	307.2	796
Grenfell	Town	Elcapo No. 154	November 1, 1911	1,059	1,099	−3.6%	3.14	1.21	337.3	874
Gull Lake	Town	Gull Lake No. 139	November 1, 1911	908	1,046	−13.2%	2.40	0.93	378.3	980
Hafford	Town	Redberry No. 435	January 1, 1981	414	407	+1.7%	1.13	0.44	366.4	949
Hague	Town	Rosthern No. 403	November 1, 1991	889	874	+1.7%	1.27	0.49	700.0	1,813
Hanley	Town	Rosedale No. 283	December 1, 1906	540	511	+5.7%	2.66	1.03	203.0	526
Hepburn	Town	Laird No. 404	October 24, 2012	784	688	+14.0%	1.14	0.44	687.7	1,781
Herbert	Town	Morse No. 165	November 1, 1912	770	856	−10.0%	3.69	1.42	208.7	541
Hudson Bay	Town	Hudson Bay No. 394	November 30, 1946	1,403	1,436	−2.3%	17.38	6.71	80.7	209
Imperial	Town	Big Arm No. 251	April 1, 1962	372	360	+3.3%	1.20	0.46	310.0	803
Indian Head	Town	Indian Head No. 156	April 19, 1902	1,902	1,910	−0.4%	3.08	1.19	617.5	1,599
Ituna	Town	Ituna Bon Accord No. 246	October 1, 1961	726	701	+3.6%	1.47	0.57	493.9	1,279
Kamsack	Town	Cote No. 271	November 1, 1911	1,779	1,898	−6.3%	5.67	2.19	313.8	813
Kelvington	Town	Kelvington No. 366	May 1, 1944	827	834	−0.8%	3.87	1.49	213.7	553
Kerrobert	Town	Progress No. 351	November 1, 1911	970	1,026	−5.5%	8.47	3.27	114.5	297
Kindersley	Town	Kindersley No. 290	November 1, 1910	4,567	4,597	−0.7%	12.91	4.98	353.8	916
Kinistino	Town	Kinistino No. 459	February 7, 1952	671	654	+2.6%	1.58	0.61	424.7	1,100
Kipling	Town	Kingsley No. 124	January 1, 1954	1,076	1,074	+0.2%	2.55	0.98	422.0	1,093
Kyle	Town	Lacadena No. 228	January 1, 1959	413	449	−8.0%	1.16	0.45	356.0	922
Lafleche	Town	Wood River No. 74	June 1, 1953	373	382	−2.4%	1.43	0.55	260.8	675
Lampman	Town	Browning No. 34	June 1, 1963	673	675	−0.3%	2.13	0.82	316.0	818
Langenburg	Town	Langenburg No. 181	September 15, 1959	1,228	1,165	+5.4%	3.38	1.31	363.3	941
Langham	Town	Corman Park No. 344	August 1, 1907	1,518	1,496	+1.5%	4.27	1.65	355.5	921
Lanigan	Town	Usborne No. 310	April 15, 1908	1,433	1,377	+4.1%	8.14	3.14	176.0	456
Lashburn	Town	Manitou Lake No. 442	March 1, 1979	870	983	−11.5%	3.05	1.18	285.2	739
Leader	Town	Happyland No. 231	May 1, 1947	881	863	+2.1%	1.68	0.65	524.4	1,358
Lemberg	Town	Abernethy No. 186	September 1, 1907	266	313	−15.0%	2.67	1.03	99.6	258
Leroy	Town	Leroy No. 339	March 1, 1963	510	450	+13.3%	2.11	0.81	241.7	626
Lumsden	Town	Lumsden No. 189	March 15, 1905	1,800	1,824	−1.3%	4.92	1.90	365.9	948
Luseland	Town	Progress No. 351	January 1, 1954	559	623	−10.3%	1.59	0.61	351.6	911
Macklin	Town	Eye Hill No. 382	November 1, 1912	1,247	1,374	−9.2%	3.05	1.18	408.9	1,059
Maidstone	Town	Eldon No. 471	March 1, 1955	1,209	1,185	+2.0%	4.39	1.69	275.4	713
Maple Creek	Town	Maple Creek No. 111	April 30, 1903	2,176	2,084	+4.4%	4.35	1.68	500.2	1,296
Marshall	Town	Wilton No. 472	October 26, 2006	522	591	−11.7%	1.15	0.44	453.9	1,176
Midale	Town	Cymri No. 36	March 1, 1962	510	604	−15.6%	1.62	0.63	314.8	815
Milestone	Town	Brock No. 64	August 15, 1906	682	699	−2.4%	2.12	0.82	321.7	833
Moosomin	Town	Moosomin No. 121	March 20, 1889	2,657	2,743	−3.1%	7.15	2.76	371.6	962
Morse	Town	Morse No. 165	November 1, 1912	216	242	−10.7%	1.54	0.59	140.3	363
Mossbank	Town	Lake Johnston No. 102	May 15, 1959	368	360	+2.2%	1.56	0.60	235.9	611
Naicam	Town	Pleasantdale No. 398	September 1, 1954	651	661	−1.5%	1.56	0.60	417.3	1,081
Nipawin	Town	Nipawin No. 487	May 1, 1937	4,570	4,401	+3.8%	8.93	3.45	511.8	1,326
Nokomis	Town	Wreford No. 280	August 15, 1908	414	404	+2.5%	2.55	0.98	162.4	421
Norquay	Town	Clayton No. 333	March 1, 1963	420	434	−3.2%	1.62	0.63	259.3	672
Ogema	Town	Key West No. 70	January 7, 1913	383	403	−5.0%	1.33	0.51	288.0	746
Osler	Town	Corman Park No. 344	November 1, 1985	1,251	1,237	+1.1%	1.62	0.63	772.2	2,000
Outlook	Town	Rudy No. 284	November 1, 1909	2,336	2,279	+2.5%	8.34	3.22	280.1	725
Oxbow	Town	Enniskillen No. 3	May 30, 1904	1,286	1,328	−3.2%	3.33	1.29	386.2	1,000
Pense	Town	Pense No. 160	October 24, 2012	603	587	+2.7%	1.32	0.51	456.8	1,183
Pilot Butte	Town	Edenwold No. 158	November 1, 1980	2,638	2,137	+23.4%	5.71	2.20	462.0	1,197
Ponteix	Town	Grassy Creek No. 78	April 1, 1957	577	563	+2.5%	1.19	0.46	484.9	1,256
Porcupine Plain	Town	Porcupine No. 395	January 1, 1968	817	862	−5.2%	2.12	0.82	385.4	998
Preeceville	Town	Preeceville No. 334	November 30, 1946	1,062	1,125	−5.6%	2.86	1.10	371.3	962
Qu'Appelle	Town	South Qu'Appelle No. 157	February 20, 1904	625	639	−2.2%	3.88	1.50	161.1	417
Radisson	Town	Great Bend No. 405	July 1, 1913	466	514	−9.3%	2.07	0.80	225.1	583
Radville	Town	Laurier No. 38	May 1, 1913	778	807	−3.6%	2.95	1.14	263.7	683
Raymore	Town	Moose Range No. 486	August 1, 1963	507	575	−11.8%	2.74	1.06	185.0	479
Redvers	Town	Antler No. 61	July 6, 1960	1,008	1,042	−3.3%	2.90	1.12	347.6	900
Regina Beach	Town	Lumsden No. 189	November 1, 1980	1,292	1,145	+12.8%	3.88	1.50	333.0	862
Rocanville	Town	Rocanville No. 151	August 1, 1967	889	863	+3.0%	2.36	0.91	376.7	976
Rockglen	Town	Poplar Valley No. 12	September 1, 1957	399	441	−9.5%	2.65	1.02	150.6	390
Rose Valley	Town	Ponass Lake No. 367	January 1, 1962	256	282	−9.2%	1.05	0.41	243.8	631
Rosetown	Town	St. Andrews No. 287	November 1, 1911	2,507	2,451	+2.3%	11.59	4.47	216.3	560
Rosthern	Town	Rosthern No. 403	November 20, 1903	1,602	1,688	−5.1%	4.14	1.60	387.0	1,002
Rouleau	Town	Redburn No. 130	March 1, 1907	505	540	−6.5%	1.54	0.59	327.9	849
Saltcoats	Town	Saltcoats No. 213	November 1, 1910	473	484	−2.3%	1.35	0.52	350.4	908
Scott	Town	Tramping Lake No. 380	November 1, 1910	74	73	+1.4%	4.17	1.61	17.7	46
Shaunavon	Town	Grassy Creek No. 78	November 1, 1914	1,784	1,714	+4.1%	4.80	1.85	371.7	963
Shellbrook	Town	Shellbrook No. 493	April 1, 1948	1,510	1,444	+4.6%	3.93	1.52	384.2	995
Sintaluta	Town	Indian Head No. 156	June 1, 1907	124	119	+4.2%	2.67	1.03	46.4	120
Southey	Town	Cupar No. 218	November 1, 1980	832	804	+3.5%	1.56	0.60	533.3	1,381
Spiritwood	Town	Spiritwood No. 496	September 1, 1965	966	913	+5.8%	2.91	1.12	332.0	860
Springside	Town	St. Philips No. 301	November 1, 1985	478	502	−4.8%	0.70	0.27	682.9	1,769
St. Brieux	Town	Lake Lenore No. 399	November 8, 2006	638	667	−4.3%	2.56	0.99	249.2	645
St. Walburg	Town	Frenchman Butte No. 501	February 1, 1953	591	689	−14.2%	2.02	0.78	292.6	758
Star City	Town	Star City No. 428	November 1, 1921	374	387	−3.4%	0.70	0.27	534.3	1,384
Stoughton	Town	Tecumseh No. 65	June 1, 1960	652	649	+0.5%	3.45	1.33	189.0	490
Strasbourg	Town	McKillop No. 220	July 1, 1907	788	800	−1.5%	5.81	2.24	135.6	351
Sturgis	Town	Preeceville No. 334	March 1, 1951	646	644	+0.3%	3.15	1.22	205.1	531
Tisdale	Town	Tisdale No. 427	November 1, 1920	2,962	3,235	−8.4%	6.56	2.53	451.5	1,169
Turtleford	Town	Mervin No. 499	July 1, 1983	503	496	+1.4%	1.66	0.64	303.0	785
Unity	Town	Round Valley No. 410	November 1, 1919	2,496	2,573	−3.0%	9.70	3.75	257.3	666
Vonda	Town	Grant No. 372	May 6, 1907	384	384	0.0%	2.75	1.06	139.6	362
Wadena	Town	Lakeview No. 337	April 1, 1912	1,269	1,288	−1.5%	2.99	1.15	424.4	1,099
Wakaw	Town	Fish Creek No. 402	August 1, 1953	978	922	+6.1%	3.09	1.19	316.5	820
Waldheim	Town	Laird No. 404	March 1, 1967	1,237	1,213	+2.0%	1.97	0.76	627.9	1,626
Wapella	Town	Martin No. 122	November 20, 1903	278	326	−14.7%	2.63	1.02	105.7	274
Watrous	Town	Morris No. 312	December 30, 1909	1,842	1,900	−3.1%	11.29	4.36	163.2	423
Watson	Town	Lakeside No. 338	August 1, 1908	707	697	+1.4%	2.96	1.14	238.9	619
Wawota	Town	Wawken No. 93	February 1, 1975	555	543	+2.2%	1.28	0.49	433.6	1,123
White City	Town	Edenwold No. 158	November 1, 2000	3,821	3,099	+23.3%	7.56	2.92	505.4	1,309
Whitewood	Town	Willowdale No. 153	December 31, 1892	944	862	+9.5%	3.93	1.52	240.2	622
Wilkie	Town	Tramping Lake No. 380	November 1, 1910	1,195	1,219	−2.0%	9.22	3.56	129.6	336
Willow Bunch	Town	Willow Bunch No. 42	October 1, 1960	299	272	+9.9%	0.91	0.35	328.6	851
Wolseley	Town	Wolseley No. 155	October 20, 1898	852	854	−0.2%	5.84	2.25	145.9	378
Wynyard	Town	Big Quill No. 308	November 1, 1911	1,724	1,798	−4.1%	5.32	2.05	324.1	839
Yellow Grass	Town	Scott No. 98	February 15, 1906	483	478	+1.0%	2.67	1.03	180.9	469
Zealandia	Town	St. Andrews No. 287	November 1, 1911	75	80	−6.2%	1.29	0.50	58.1	150
Abbey	Village	Miry Creek No. 229	September 2, 1913	100	129	−22.5%	0.73	0.28	137.0	355
Abernethy	Village	Abernethy No. 186	July 26, 1904	190	204	−6.9%	0.98	0.38	193.9	502
Albertville	Village	Wise Creek No. 77	January 1, 1986	121	142	−14.8%	1.13	0.44	107.1	277
Alida	Village	Reciprocity No. 32	February 19, 1926	103	120	−14.2%	0.38	0.15	271.1	702
Alvena	Village	Fish Creek No. 402	July 1, 1936	75	60	+25.0%	0.43	0.17	174.4	452
Annaheim	Village	St. Peter No. 369	April 1, 1977	206	210	−1.9%	0.70	0.27	294.3	762
Archerwill	Village	Barrier Valley No. 397	January 1, 1947	153	166	−7.8%	0.82	0.32	186.6	483
Arran	Village	Livingston No. 331	September 21, 1916	20	25	−20.0%	0.72	0.28	27.8	72
Atwater	Village	Fertile Belt No. 183	August 12, 1910	27	30	−10.0%	1.84	0.71	14.7	38
Avonlea	Village	Elmsthorpe No. 100	February 10, 1912	411	393	+4.6%	1.30	0.50	316.2	819
Aylesbury	Village	Craik No. 222	March 31, 1910	67	40	+67.5%	1.31	0.51	51.1	132
Aylsham	Village	Nipawin No. 487	August 4, 1947	82	65	+26.2%	0.53	0.20	154.7	401
Bangor	Village	Fertile Belt No. 183	June 8, 1911	40	38	+5.3%	1.57	0.61	25.5	66
Beatty	Village	Flett's Springs No. 429	March 31, 1921	65	60	+8.3%	0.82	0.32	79.3	205
Beechy	Village	Victory No. 226	May 11, 1925	209	228	−8.3%	1.09	0.42	191.7	497
Belle Plaine	Village	Pense No. 160	August 12, 1910	79	85	−7.1%	1.35	0.52	58.5	152
Bethune	Village	Dufferin No. 190	August 2, 1912	560	399	+40.4%	2.38	0.92	235.3	609
Bjorkdale	Village	Bjorkdale No. 426	April 1, 1968	147	201	−26.9%	1.36	0.53	108.1	280
Bladworth	Village	McCraney No. 282	July 27, 1906	71	65	+9.2%	0.87	0.34	81.6	211
Borden	Village	Great Bend No. 405	July 19, 1907	281	287	−2.1%	0.73	0.28	384.9	997
Bracken	Village	Lone Tree No. 18	January 4, 1926	20	20	0.0%	0.63	0.24	31.7	82
Bradwell	Village	Blucher No. 343	December 26, 1912	164	166	−1.2%	0.42	0.16	390.5	1,011
Briercrest	Village	Redburn No. 130	April 17, 1912	155	159	−2.5%	0.69	0.27	224.6	582
Brock	Village	Kindersley No. 290	July 7, 1910	134	142	−5.6%	0.70	0.27	191.4	496
Broderick	Village	Rudy No. 284	September 13, 1909	96	85	+12.9%	0.77	0.30	124.7	323
Brownlee	Village	Eyebrow No. 193	December 29, 1908	55	55	0.0%	2.57	0.99	21.4	55
Buchanan	Village	Buchanan No. 304	June 11, 1907	237	218	+8.7%	1.13	0.44	209.7	543
Buena Vista	Village	Lumsden No. 189	November 18, 1983	646	612	+5.6%	3.63	1.40	178.0	461
Bulyea	Village	McKillop No. 220	March 9, 1909	121	113	+7.1%	1.26	0.49	96.0	249
Cadillac	Village	Wise Creek No. 77	July 2, 1914	116	92	+26.1%	1.16	0.45	100.0	259
Calder	Village	Calder No. 241	January 18, 1911	81	90	−10.0%	0.75	0.29	108.0	280
Canwood	Village	Canwood No. 494	July 18, 1916	314	332	−5.4%	2.42	0.93	129.8	336
Carievale	Village	Argyle No. 1	March 14, 1903	244	240	+1.7%	1.51	0.58	161.6	419
Caronport	Village	Caron No. 162	January 1, 1988	1,033	994	+3.9%	1.82	0.70	567.6	1,470
Ceylon	Village	The Gap No. 39	September 26, 1911	97	111	−12.6%	0.76	0.29	127.6	330
Chamberlain	Village	Sarnia No. 221	January 31, 1911	96	90	+6.7%	0.68	0.26	141.2	366
Chaplin	Village	Chaplin No. 164	October 8, 1912	222	229	−3.1%	1.15	0.44	193.0	500
Christopher Lake	Village	Lakeland No. 521	March 1, 1985	302	289	+4.5%	4.59	1.77	65.8	170
Clavet	Village	Blucher No. 343	July 1, 1978	450	410	+9.8%	0.86	0.33	523.3	1,355
Climax	Village	Lone Tree No. 18	December 11, 1923	137	195	−29.7%	0.94	0.36	145.7	377
Coderre	Village	Rodgers No. 133	August 26, 1925	30	30	0.0%	0.85	0.33	35.3	91
Codette	Village	Nipawin No. 487	March 9, 1929	180	198	−9.1%	0.41	0.16	439.0	1,137
Coleville	Village	Oakdale No. 320	July 1, 1953	280	305	−8.2%	1.66	0.64	168.7	437
Conquest	Village	Fertile Valley No. 285	October 24, 1911	167	160	+4.4%	1.00	0.39	167.0	433
Consul	Village	Reno No. 51	June 12, 1917	50	73	−31.5%	0.70	0.27	71.4	185
Craven	Village	Longlaketon No. 219	April 11, 1905	266	214	+24.3%	1.22	0.47	218.0	565
Creelman	Village	Fillmore No. 96	April 6, 1906	103	113	−8.8%	1.35	0.52	76.3	198
Debden	Village	Canwood No. 494	June 7, 1922	327	337	−3.0%	1.34	0.52	244.0	632
Denholm	Village	Mayfield No. 406	June 25, 1912	75	88	−14.8%	0.35	0.14	214.3	555
Denzil	Village	Eye Hill No. 382	May 3, 1911	140	143	−2.1%	0.61	0.24	229.5	594
Dilke	Village	Sarnia No. 221	December 30, 1912	60	98	−38.8%	1.28	0.49	46.9	121
Dinsmore	Village	Milden No. 286	November 3, 1913	267	289	−7.6%	2.55	0.98	104.7	271
Disley	Village	Lumsden No. 189	June 24, 1907	58	67	−13.4%	0.65	0.25	89.2	231
Dodsland	Village	Winslow No. 319	August 23, 1913	215	215	0.0%	2.86	1.10	75.2	195
Dorintosh	Village	Meadow Lake No. 588	January 1, 1989	107	134	−20.1%	0.28	0.11	382.1	990
Drake	Village	Usborne No. 310	September 19, 1910	197	197	0.0%	0.64	0.25	307.8	797
Drinkwater	Village	Redburn No. 130	June 7, 1904	74	70	+5.7%	2.64	1.02	28.0	73
Dubuc	Village	Grayson No. 184	May 29, 1905	71	61	+16.4%	0.61	0.24	116.4	301
Duval	Village	Last Mountain Valley No. 250	December 21, 1910	95	83	+14.5%	0.67	0.26	141.8	367
Dysart	Village	Lipton No. 217	April 6, 1909	188	200	−6.0%	1.19	0.46	158.0	409
Earl Grey	Village	Longlaketon No. 219	July 27, 1906	229	246	−6.9%	1.35	0.52	169.6	439
Ebenezer	Village	Orkney No. 244	July 1, 1948	188	185	+1.6%	0.60	0.23	313.3	811
Edam	Village	Turtle River No. 469	October 12, 1911	476	485	−1.9%	1.14	0.44	417.5	1,081
Edenwold	Village	Edenwold No. 158	October 3, 1912	243	233	+4.3%	0.69	0.27	352.2	912
Elbow	Village	Loreburn No. 254	April 6, 1909	341	337	+1.2%	3.96	1.53	86.1	223
Elfros	Village	Elfros No. 307	December 1, 1909	90	90	0.0%	2.48	0.96	36.3	94
Endeavour	Village	Preeceville No. 334	April 29, 1953	75	65	+15.4%	1.00	0.39	75.0	194
Englefeld	Village	St. Peter No. 369	June 13, 1916	259	285	−9.1%	0.66	0.25	392.4	1,016
Ernfold	Village	Morse No. 165	December 4, 1912	20	15	+33.3%	1.29	0.50	15.5	40
Eyebrow	Village	Eyebrow No. 193	January 8, 1909	130	119	+9.2%	2.52	0.97	51.6	134
Fairlight	Village	Maryfield No. 91	October 5, 1909	25	40	−37.5%	2.58	1.00	9.7	25
Fenwood	Village	Stanley No. 215	June 30, 1909	42	30	+40.0%	1.74	0.67	24.1	62
Fillmore	Village	Fillmore No. 96	June 10, 1905	282	311	−9.3%	1.32	0.51	213.6	553
Flaxcombe	Village	Kindersley No. 290	June 4, 1913	134	124	+8.1%	1.45	0.56	92.4	239
Forget	Village	Tecumseh No. 65	November 21, 1904	35	55	−36.4%	1.37	0.53	25.5	66
Fosston	Village	Ponass Lake No. 367	January 1, 1965	40	45	−11.1%	0.54	0.21	74.1	192
Fox Valley	Village	Fox Valley No. 171	August 30, 1928	259	249	+4.0%	0.70	0.27	370.0	958
Frobisher	Village	Coalfields No. 4	July 4, 1904	127	160	−20.6%	1.43	0.55	88.8	230
Frontier	Village	Frontier No. 19	July 10, 1930	364	372	−2.2%	1.05	0.41	346.7	898
Gainsborough	Village	Argyle No. 1	May 25, 1894	227	254	−10.6%	0.94	0.36	241.5	625
Gerald	Village	Spy Hill No. 152	March 25, 1953	129	136	−5.1%	0.74	0.29	174.3	451
Glaslyn	Village	Parkdale No. 498	April 16, 1929	353	387	−8.8%	1.91	0.74	184.8	479
Glen Ewen	Village	Enniskillen No. 3	March 24, 1904	185	154	+20.1%	2.59	1.00	71.4	185
Glenavon	Village	Chester No. 125	April 13, 1910	179	182	−1.6%	1.29	0.50	138.8	359
Glenside	Village	Rudy No. 284	March 30, 1911	73	76	−3.9%	0.78	0.30	93.6	242
Golden Prairie	Village	Big Stick No. 141	April 15, 1942	30	30	0.0%	0.48	0.19	62.5	162
Goodeve	Village	Stanley No. 215	August 18, 1910	40	40	0.0%	2.38	0.92	16.8	44
Goodsoil	Village	Beaver River No. 622	January 1, 1960	301	282	+6.7%	1.78	0.69	169.1	438
Goodwater	Village	Lomond No. 37	May 8, 1911	40	30	+33.3%	0.56	0.22	71.4	185
Grayson	Village	Grayson No. 184	April 19, 1906	185	211	−12.3%	1.79	0.69	103.4	268
Halbrite	Village	Cymri No. 36	February 26, 1904	110	119	−7.6%	1.10	0.42	100.0	259
Harris	Village	Harris No. 316	August 10, 1909	190	193	−1.6%	0.89	0.34	213.5	553
Hawarden	Village	Loreburn No. 254	July 16, 1909	50	52	−3.8%	1.12	0.43	44.6	116
Hazenmore	Village	Pinto Creek No. 75	August 20, 1913	75	65	+15.4%	0.68	0.26	110.3	286
Hazlet	Village	Pittville No. 169	January 1, 1963	90	106	−15.1%	0.55	0.21	163.6	424
Heward	Village	Tecumseh No. 65	November 21, 1904	30	44	−31.8%	0.92	0.36	32.6	84
Hodgeville	Village	Lawtonia No. 135	June 22, 1921	147	172	−14.5%	1.24	0.48	118.5	307
Holdfast	Village	Sarnia No. 221	October 5, 1911	173	247	−30.0%	1.32	0.51	131.1	340
Hubbard	Village	Ituna Bon Accord No. 246	June 11, 1910	45	35	+28.6%	1.07	0.41	42.1	109
Hyas	Village	Clayton No. 333	May 23, 1919	89	65	+36.9%	0.41	0.16	217.1	562
Invermay	Village	Invermay No. 305	September 1, 1908	272	273	−0.4%	1.20	0.46	226.7	587
Jansen	Village	Wolverine No. 340	October 19, 1908	111	96	+15.6%	0.87	0.34	127.6	330
Kelliher	Village	Kellross No. 247	April 27, 1909	244	217	+12.4%	2.57	0.99	94.9	246
Kenaston	Village	McCraney No. 282	July 18, 1910	292	282	+3.5%	1.14	0.44	256.1	663
Kendal	Village	Montmartre No. 126	February 17, 1919	59	83	−28.9%	0.62	0.24	95.2	247
Kennedy	Village	Wawken No. 93	November 5, 1907	232	216	+7.4%	1.57	0.61	147.8	383
Kenosee Lake	Village	Wawken No. 93	October 1, 1987	236	234	+0.9%	0.40	0.15	590.0	1,528
Killaly	Village	McLeod No. 185	April 28, 1909	58	65	−10.8%	2.64	1.02	22.0	57
Kincaid	Village	Pinto Creek No. 75	July 19, 1913	120	111	+8.1%	0.54	0.21	222.2	575
Kinley	Village	Perdue No. 346	January 7, 1909	60	60	0.0%	1.18	0.46	50.8	132
Kisbey	Village	Brock No. 64	May 8, 1907	158	153	+3.3%	2.69	1.04	58.7	152
Krydor	Village	Redberry No. 435	August 25, 1914	15	15	0.0%	0.94	0.36	16.0	41
Laird	Village	Rosthern No. 403	May 4, 1911	265	267	−0.7%	1.23	0.47	215.4	558
Lake Lenore	Village	Lake Lenore No. 399	April 28, 1921	289	284	+1.8%	0.97	0.37	297.9	772
Lancer	Village	Miry Creek No. 229	September 11, 1913	58	69	−15.9%	1.32	0.51	43.9	114
Landis	Village	Reford No. 379	May 17, 1909	133	152	−12.5%	0.84	0.32	158.3	410
Lang	Village	Scott No. 98	July 27, 1906	176	189	−6.9%	0.65	0.25	270.8	701
Leask	Village	Leask No. 464	September 3, 1912	379	399	−5.0%	0.73	0.28	519.2	1,345
Lebret	Village	North Qu'Appelle No. 187	October 14, 1912	226	221	+2.3%	1.24	0.48	182.3	472
Leoville	Village	Spiritwood No. 496	June 26, 1944	364	375	−2.9%	1.14	0.44	319.3	827
Leross	Village	Kellross No. 247	December 1, 1909	40	46	−13.0%	1.28	0.49	31.3	81
Liberty	Village	Big Arm No. 251	January 23, 1912	68	78	−12.8%	1.42	0.55	47.9	124
Limerick	Village	Stonehenge No. 73	July 10, 1913	114	115	−0.9%	0.61	0.24	186.9	484
Lintlaw	Village	Hazel Dell No. 335	December 14, 1921	150	172	−12.8%	1.24	0.48	121.0	313
Lipton	Village	Lipton No. 217	May 15, 1905	284	345	−17.7%	0.70	0.27	405.7	1,051
Loon Lake	Village	Loon Lake No. 561	January 1, 1950	281	288	−2.4%	0.74	0.29	379.7	983
Loreburn	Village	Loreburn No. 254	May 20, 1909	100	107	−6.5%	0.56	0.22	178.6	463
Love	Village	Torch River No. 488	June 2, 1945	50	50	0.0%	0.40	0.15	125.0	324
Lucky Lake	Village	Canaan No. 225	November 23, 1920	270	289	−6.6%	0.82	0.32	329.3	853
MacNutt	Village	Churchbridge No. 211	February 22, 1913	50	65	−23.1%	0.92	0.36	54.3	141
Macoun	Village	Cymri No. 36	October 16, 1903	272	269	+1.1%	1.70	0.66	160.0	414
Macrorie	Village	Fertile Valley No. 285	February 8, 1912	65	68	−4.4%	0.72	0.28	90.3	234
Major	Village	Prairiedale No. 321	September 29, 1914	35	35	0.0%	2.60	1.00	13.5	35
Makwa	Village	Loon Lake No. 561	June 1, 1965	78	84	−7.1%	0.58	0.22	134.5	348
Mankota	Village	Mankota No. 45	February 3, 1941	198	205	−3.4%	1.50	0.58	132.0	342
Manor	Village	Moose Mountain No. 63	April 15, 1902	305	295	+3.4%	2.58	1.00	118.2	306
Marcelin	Village	Blaine Lake No. 434	September 25, 1911	142	153	−7.2%	1.29	0.50	110.1	285
Marengo	Village	Milton No. 292	November 5, 1910	75	67	+11.9%	0.89	0.34	84.3	218
Margo	Village	Sasman No. 336	April 24, 1911	65	83	−21.7%	0.71	0.27	91.5	237
Markinch	Village	Cupar No. 218	February 16, 1911	55	58	−5.2%	0.68	0.26	80.9	210
Marquis	Village	Marquis No. 191	March 21, 1910	90	97	−7.2%	0.63	0.24	142.9	370
Marsden	Village	Manitou Lake No. 442	April 24, 1931	281	297	−5.4%	0.79	0.31	355.7	921
Maryfield	Village	Maryfield No. 91	August 21, 1907	311	348	−10.6%	2.57	0.99	121.0	313
Maymont	Village	Mayfield No. 406	June 24, 1907	163	138	+18.1%	0.54	0.21	301.9	782
McLean	Village	South Qu'Appelle No. 157	September 1, 1966	392	405	−3.2%	1.32	0.51	297.0	769
McTaggart	Village	Weyburn No. 67	October 5, 1909	125	121	+3.3%	0.75	0.29	166.7	432
Meacham	Village	Colonsay No. 342	June 19, 1912	96	99	−3.0%	1.26	0.49	76.2	197
Meath Park	Village	Garden River No. 490	May 23, 1938	169	175	−3.4%	0.53	0.20	318.9	826
Medstead	Village	Medstead No. 497	April 23, 1931	121	130	−6.9%	0.65	0.25	186.2	482
Mendham	Village	Happyland No. 231	April 1, 1930	25	30	−16.7%	0.59	0.23	42.4	110
Meota	Village	Meota No. 468	July 6, 1911	325	304	+6.9%	1.61	0.62	201.9	523
Mervin	Village	Mervin No. 499	March 17, 1920	159	159	0.0%	0.69	0.27	230.4	597
Middle Lake	Village	Three Lakes No. 400	January 1, 1963	188	241	−22.0%	1.02	0.39	184.3	477
Milden	Village	Milden No. 286	July 20, 1911	153	167	−8.4%	0.96	0.37	159.4	413
Minton	Village	Surprise Valley No. 9	January 1, 1951	50	55	−9.1%	0.25	0.097	200.0	518
Mistatim	Village	Bjorkdale No. 426	July 1, 1952	30	101	−70.3%	0.51	0.20	58.8	152
Montmartre	Village	Montmartre No. 126	October 19, 1908	450	490	−8.2%	1.69	0.65	266.3	690
Mortlach	Village	Wheatlands No. 163	January 1, 1949	274	261	+5.0%	2.87	1.11	95.5	247
Muenster	Village	St. Peter No. 369	August 18, 1908	403	430	−6.3%	1.36	0.53	296.3	767
Neilburg	Village	Hillsdale No. 440	January 1, 1947	371	379	−2.1%	1.24	0.48	299.2	775
Netherhill	Village	Kindersley No. 290	April 28, 1910	25	25	0.0%	0.77	0.30	32.5	84
Neudorf	Village	McLeod No. 185	April 25, 1905	272	263	+3.4%	1.94	0.75	140.2	363
Neville	Village	Whiska Creek No. 106	July 5, 1912	88	87	+1.1%	0.96	0.37	91.7	238
North Portal	Village	Coalfields No. 4	November 16, 1903	113	115	−1.7%	2.65	1.02	42.6	110
Odessa	Village	Francis No. 127	March 14, 1911	220	205	+7.3%	1.08	0.42	203.7	528
Osage	Village	Fillmore No. 96	May 8, 1906	25	20	+25.0%	0.62	0.24	40.3	104
Paddockwood	Village	Paddockwood No. 520	January 1, 1949	118	154	−23.4%	0.65	0.25	181.5	470
Pangman	Village	Norton No. 69	May 17, 1911	238	232	+2.6%	0.73	0.28	326.0	844
Paradise Hill	Village	Frenchman Butte No. 501	January 1, 1947	471	491	−4.1%	2.28	0.88	206.6	535
Parkside	Village	Leask No. 464	February 21, 1913	132	121	+9.1%	0.72	0.28	183.3	475
Paynton	Village	Paynton No. 470	May 2, 1907	120	148	−18.9%	0.82	0.32	146.3	379
Pelly	Village	St. Philips No. 301	May 4, 1911	255	285	−10.5%	0.96	0.37	265.6	688
Pennant	Village	Riverside No. 168	July 29, 1912	120	130	−7.7%	0.65	0.25	184.6	478
Perdue	Village	Perdue No. 346	July 15, 1909	313	334	−6.3%	1.03	0.40	303.9	787
Pierceland	Village	Beaver River No. 622	January 1, 1973	605	598	+1.2%	2.74	1.06	220.8	572
Pilger	Village	Three Lakes No. 400	January 1, 1969	65	65	0.0%	0.49	0.19	132.7	344
Pleasantdale	Village	Pleasantdale No. 398	January 1, 1987	80	76	+5.3%	0.53	0.20	150.9	391
Plenty	Village	Winslow No. 319	March 25, 1911	128	164	−22.0%	0.61	0.24	209.8	543
Plunkett	Village	Viscount No. 341	December 28, 1921	60	60	0.0%	0.67	0.26	89.6	232
Prud'homme	Village	Bayne No. 371	November 15, 1922	177	167	+6.0%	0.79	0.31	224.1	580
Punnichy	Village	Mount Hope No. 279	October 22, 1909	212	213	−0.5%	0.68	0.26	311.8	808
Quill Lake	Village	Lakeside No. 338	December 8, 1906	377	387	−2.6%	1.32	0.51	285.6	740
Quinton	Village	Mount Hope No. 279	March 1, 1910	89	101	−11.9%	0.97	0.37	91.8	238
Rama	Village	Invermay No. 305	December 18, 1919	70	80	−12.5%	0.67	0.26	104.5	271
Rhein	Village	Wallace No. 243	March 10, 1913	149	170	−12.4%	1.08	0.42	138.0	357
Richard	Village	Douglas No. 436	October 11, 1916	25	20	+25.0%	0.72	0.28	34.7	90
Richmound	Village	Enterprise No. 142	May 5, 1947	118	147	−19.7%	0.48	0.19	245.8	637
Ridgedale	Village	Connaught No. 457	December 15, 1921	65	55	+18.2%	0.65	0.25	100.0	259
Riverhurst	Village	Maple Bush No. 224	June 22, 1916	152	130	+16.9%	1.01	0.39	150.5	390
Roche Percee	Village	Coalfields No. 4	January 12, 1909	75	110	−31.8%	2.87	1.11	26.1	68
Ruddell	Village	Mayfield No. 406	March 18, 1914	20	20	0.0%	0.47	0.18	42.6	110
Rush Lake	Village	Excelsior No. 166	October 16, 1911	55	53	+3.8%	0.70	0.27	78.6	204
Sceptre	Village	Clinworth No. 230	April 30, 1913	78	94	−17.0%	1.33	0.51	58.6	152
Sedley	Village	Francis No. 127	August 3, 1907	367	358	+2.5%	1.34	0.52	273.9	709
Semans	Village	Mount Hope No. 279	December 14, 1908	180	196	−8.2%	1.08	0.42	166.7	432
Senlac	Village	Senlac No. 411	October 11, 1916	36	41	−12.2%	0.66	0.25	54.5	141
Shamrock	Village	Shamrock No. 134	January 1, 1960	20	20	0.0%	0.79	0.31	25.3	66
Sheho	Village	Insinger No. 275	June 30, 1905	122	105	+16.2%	1.88	0.73	64.9	168
Shell Lake	Village	Spiritwood No. 496	October 18, 1940	189	175	+8.0%	1.39	0.54	136.0	352
Silton	Village	McKillop No. 220	July 2, 1914	95	71	+33.8%	1.06	0.41	89.6	232
Simpson	Village	Wood Creek No. 281	July 11, 1911	131	127	+3.1%	1.57	0.61	83.4	216
Smeaton	Village	Torch River No. 488	March 7, 1944	163	182	−10.4%	1.46	0.56	111.6	289
Smiley	Village	Prairiedale No. 321	November 26, 1913	25	60	−58.3%	0.62	0.24	40.3	104
Spalding	Village	Spalding No. 368	March 11, 1924	213	244	−12.7%	1.19	0.46	179.0	464
Speers	Village	Douglas No. 436	December 24, 1915	72	60	+20.0%	0.68	0.26	105.9	274
Spy Hill	Village	Spy Hill No. 152	April 22, 1910	173	168	+3.0%	1.15	0.44	150.4	390
St. Benedict	Village	Three Lakes No. 400	January 1, 1964	80	84	−4.8%	0.55	0.21	145.5	377
St. Gregor	Village	St. Peter No. 369	March 26, 1920	104	97	+7.2%	0.84	0.32	123.8	321
St. Louis	Village	St. Louis No. 431	May 19, 1959	432	415	+4.1%	0.97	0.37	445.4	1,154
Stenen	Village	Clayton No. 333	August 14, 1912	89	90	−1.1%	0.71	0.27	125.4	325
Stewart Valley	Village	Saskatchewan Landing No. 167	January 1, 1958	107	91	+17.6%	0.86	0.33	124.4	322
Stockholm	Village	Fertile Belt No. 183	June 30, 1905	329	352	−6.5%	1.63	0.63	201.8	523
Storthoaks	Village	Storthoaks No. 31	June 5, 1940	86	108	−20.4%	0.45	0.17	191.1	495
Strongfield	Village	Loreburn No. 254	May 3, 1912	55	40	+37.5%	0.65	0.25	84.6	219
Success	Village	Riverside No. 168	October 25, 1912	45	45	0.0%	1.36	0.53	33.1	86
Tantallon	Village	Spy Hill No. 152	June 17, 1904	84	91	−7.7%	0.84	0.32	100.0	259
Tessier	Village	Harris No. 316	August 24, 1909	25	25	0.0%	1.00	0.39	25.0	65
Theodore	Village	Insinger No. 275	July 5, 1907	315	323	−2.5%	1.51	0.58	208.6	540
Togo	Village	Cote No. 271	September 4, 1906	83	86	−3.5%	1.44	0.56	57.6	149
Tompkins	Village	Gull Lake No. 139	June 2, 1910	153	152	+0.7%	2.68	1.03	57.1	148
Torquay	Village	Cambria No. 6	December 11, 1923	215	255	−15.7%	1.35	0.52	159.3	413
Tramping Lake	Village	Tramping Lake No. 380	April 10, 1917	35	60	−41.7%	1.27	0.49	27.6	71
Tugaske	Village	Huron No. 223	May 7, 1909	79	75	+5.3%	0.75	0.29	105.3	273
Tuxford	Village	Marquis No. 191	July 19, 1907	103	113	−8.8%	0.68	0.26	151.5	392
Val Marie	Village	Val Marie No. 17	September 13, 1926	120	126	−4.8%	0.43	0.17	279.1	723
Valparaiso	Village	Star City No. 428	July 18, 1924	25	15	+66.7%	0.74	0.29	33.8	88
Vanguard	Village	Whiska Creek No. 106	July 8, 1912	184	134	+37.3%	1.86	0.72	98.9	256
Vanscoy	Village	Vanscoy No. 345	June 17, 1919	477	462	+3.2%	2.47	0.95	193.1	500
Vibank	Village	Francis No. 127	June 23, 1911	386	385	+0.3%	0.71	0.27	543.7	1,408
Viscount	Village	Viscount No. 341	December 17, 1908	282	232	+21.6%	1.49	0.58	189.3	490
Waldeck	Village	Excelsior No. 166	December 23, 1913	294	277	+6.1%	1.99	0.77	147.7	383
Waldron	Village	Grayson No. 184	July 17, 1909	15	15	0.0%	1.38	0.53	10.9	28
Waseca	Village	Eldon No. 471	March 15, 1911	113	149	−24.2%	0.65	0.25	173.8	450
Webb	Village	Webb No. 138	June 18, 1910	71	50	+42.0%	1.23	0.47	57.7	149
Weekes	Village	Porcupine No. 395	January 13, 1947	50	40	+25.0%	0.53	0.20	94.3	244
Weirdale	Village	Garden River No. 490	April 1, 1948	55	50	+10.0%	1.20	0.46	45.8	119
Weldon	Village	Kinistino No. 459	January 24, 1914	160	197	−18.8%	1	160.0	414	
White Fox	Village	Torch River No. 488	July 21, 1941	343	355	−3.4%	0.99	0.38	346.5	897
Wilcox	Village	Bratt's Lake No. 129	April 20, 1907	261	264	−1.1%	1.43	0.55	182.5	473
Windthorst	Village	Chester No. 125	August 21, 1907	194	211	−8.1%	1.34	0.52	144.8	375
Wiseton	Village	Milden No. 286	September 23, 1913	64	79	−19.0%	0.71	0.27	90.1	233
Wood Mountain	Village	Old Post No. 43	March 4, 1930	20	20	0.0%	0.61	0.24	32.8	85
Yarbo	Village	Langenburg No. 181	July 1, 1964	48	57	−15.8%	0.76	0.29	63.2	164
Young	Village	Morris No. 312	June 7, 1910	253	244	+3.7%	2.54	0.98	99.6	258
Zelma	Village	Bayne No. 371	August 10, 1910	28	35	−20.0%	0.71	0.27	39.4	102
Zenon Park	Village	Arborfield No. 456	July 28, 1941	176	194	−9.3%	0.53	0.20	332.1	860
Alice Beach	Resort village	Sarnia No. 221	July 1, 1983	82	51	+60.8%	0.71	0.27	115.5	299
Aquadeo	Resort village	Meota No. 468	January 1, 1988	203	111	+82.9%	0.70	0.27	290.0	751
Beaver Flat	Resort village	Excelsior No. 166	April 1, 1981	82	72	+13.9%	0.89	0.34	92.1	239
Big Shell	Resort village	Spiritwood No. 496	August 1, 1982	64	48	+33.3%	0.93	0.36	68.8	178
Bird's Point	Resort village	Fertile Belt No. 183	September 1, 1981	150	112	+33.9%	0.59	0.23	254.2	658
B-Say-Tah	Resort village	North Qu'Appelle No. 187	August 6, 1915	177	156	+13.5%	1.02	0.39	173.5	449
Candle Lake	Resort village	Paddockwood No. 520	August 1, 1977	1,160	840	+38.1%	62.93	24.30	18.4	48
Chitek Lake	Resort village	Big River No. 555	July 1, 1978	300	138	+117.4%	2.57	0.99	116.7	302
Chorney Beach	Resort village	Foam Lake No. 276	January 1, 1991	51	42	+21.4%	0.23	0.089	221.7	574
Cochin	Resort village	Meota No. 468	January 1, 1988	219	148	+48.0%	1.32	0.51	165.9	430
Coteau Beach	Resort village	Coteau No. 255	August 1, 1982	170	48	+254.2%	0.70	0.27	242.9	629
Echo Bay	Resort village	Spiritwood No. 496	August 1, 1982	68	40	+70.0%	0.74	0.29	91.9	238
Etters Beach	Resort village	Big Arm No. 251	October 1, 1965	40	30	+33.3%	0.26	0.10	153.8	398
Fort San	Resort village	North Qu'Appelle No. 187	September 1, 1987	233	222	+5.0%	2.55	0.98	91.4	237
Glen Harbour	Resort village	McKillop No. 220	July 1, 1986	91	67	+35.8%	0.35	0.14	260.0	673
Grandview Beach	Resort village	Sarnia No. 221	July 4, 1960	118	35	+237.1%	0.25	0.097	472.0	1,222
Greig Lake	Resort village	Meadow Lake No. 588	January 1, 1983	24	10	+140.0%	0.10	0.039	240.0	622
Island View	Resort village	McKillop No. 220	January 1, 1994	134	74	+81.1%	0.45	0.17	297.8	771
Kannata Valley	Resort village	Longlaketon No. 219	September 1, 1966	126	88	+43.2%	0.63	0.24	200.0	518
Katepwa	Resort village	Abernethy No. 186	July 24, 2004	539	312	+72.8%	4.49	1.73	120.0	311
Kivimaa-Moonlight Bay	Resort village	Mervin No. 499	January 1, 1989	137	84	+63.1%	0.57	0.22	240.4	623
Leslie Beach	Resort village	Foam Lake No. 276	July 1, 1999	110	41	+168.3%	0.66	0.25	166.7	432
Lumsden Beach	Resort village	Lumsden No. 189	July 22, 1918	20	10	+100.0%	0.46	0.18	43.5	113
Manitou Beach	Resort village	Morris No. 312	August 11, 1919	364	314	+15.9%	2.28	0.88	159.6	413
Melville Beach	Resort village	Grayson No. 184	July 1, 1983	54	19	+184.2%	0.11	0.042	490.9	1,271
Metinota	Resort village	Meota No. 468	August 19, 1924	86	80	+7.5%	0.46	0.18	187.0	484
Mistusinne	Resort village	Maple Bush No. 224	August 1, 1980	118	77	+53.2%	1.92	0.74	61.5	159
North Grove	Resort village	Dufferin No. 190	January 1, 1989	175	132	+32.6%	3.72	1.44	47.0	122
Pebble Baye	Resort village	Leask No. 464	January 1, 1983	69	45	+53.3%	0.68	0.26	101.5	263
Pelican Pointe	Resort village	McKillop No. 220	January 1, 1987	38	28	+35.7%	0.12	0.046	316.7	820
Saskatchewan Beach	Resort village	McKillop No. 220	June 16, 1919	322	258	+24.8%	1.57	0.61	205.1	531
Shields	Resort village	Dundurn No. 314	January 1, 1981	351	288	+21.9%	0.75	0.29	468.0	1,212
South Lake	Resort village	Marquis No. 191	January 1, 1989	226	169	+33.7%	4.95	1.91	45.7	118
Sun Valley	Resort village	Marquis No. 191	January 1, 1985	154	118	+30.5%	2.03	0.78	75.9	197
Sunset Cove	Resort village	McKillop No. 220	January 1, 1983	21	18	+16.7%	0.17	0.066	123.5	320
Thode	Resort village	Dundurn No. 314	January 1, 1981	163	157	+3.8%	0.72	0.28	226.4	586
Tobin Lake	Resort village	Moose Range No. 486	August 1, 1973	139	89	+56.2%	2.29	0.88	60.7	157
Turtle View	Resort village	Parkdale No. 498	January 1, 2020			NA				
Wakaw Lake	Resort village	Hoodoo No. 401	October 21, 1959	66	72	−8.3%	0.61	0.24	108.2	280
Wee Too Beach	Resort village	Sarnia No. 221	January 1, 1986	75	79	−5.1%	0.17	0.066	441.2	1,143
West End	Resort village	Fertile Belt No. 183	June 15, 1983	41	37	+10.8%	0.37	0.14	110.8	287
Sub-total cities				689,475	656,168	+5.1%	776.63	299.86	887.8	2,299
Sub-total towns				145,995	146,488	−0.3%	512.52	197.89	284.9	738
Sub-total villages				40,447	41,424	−2.4%	288.17	111.26	140.4	364
Sub-total resort villages				6,578	4,571	+43.9%	105.87	40.88	62.1	161
Total urban municipalities				882,677	848,839	+4.0%	1,684.34	650.33	524.0	1,357

== Rural municipalities ==
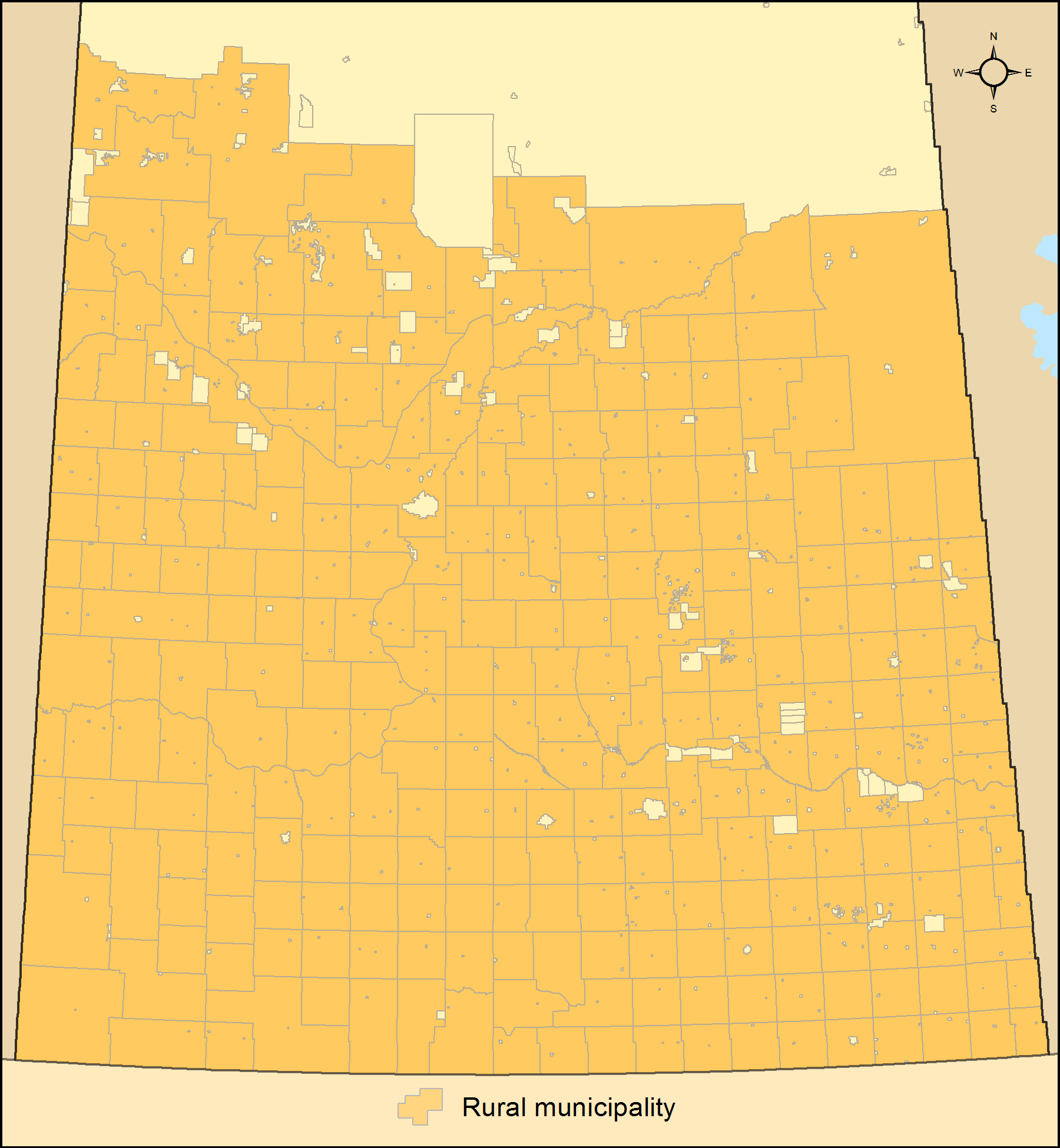
Distribution of Saskatchewan's 296 rural municipalities (2013)

A rural municipality (RM) can be created by Saskatchewan's Minister of Municipal Relations by ministerial order via section 49 of The Municipalities Act. Saskatchewan has 296 rural municipalities, which are located in the central and southern portions of the province. The largest and smallest rural municipalities by population are the RM of Corman Park No. 344 and the RM of Glen McPherson No. 46 with 8,909 and 76. The largest and smallest rural municipalities by land area are the RM of Hudson Bay No. 394 and the RM of Hillsborough No. 132 with 12,399.12 km^{2} (4,787.33 mi^{2}) and 434.18 km^{2} (167.64 mi^{2}).

List of rural municipalities in Saskatchewan
Name	Incorporation date	2021 Census of Population						
Name	Incorporation date	Population (2021)	Population (2016)	Change	Land area		Population density	
Name	Incorporation date	Population (2021)	Population (2016)	Change	km^{2}	sqmi	/km^{2}	/sqmi
Aberdeen No. 373	December 13, 1909	1,461	1,379	+5.9%	671.82	259.39	2.2	5.7
Abernethy No. 186	December 11, 1911	337	362	−6.9%	763.11	294.64	0.4	1.0
Antelope Park No. 322	December 11, 1911	124	130	−4.6%	609.52	235.34	0.2	0.52
Antler No. 61	December 13, 1909	451	523	−13.8%	804.28	310.53	0.6	1.6
Arborfield No. 456	January 1, 1913	338	343	−1.5%	1,403.77	542.00	0.2	0.52
Argyle No. 1	December 19, 1912	245	290	−15.5%	567.05	218.94	0.4	1.0
Arlington No. 79	January 1, 1913	359	366	−1.9%	841.62	324.95	0.4	1.0
Arm River No. 252	December 13, 1909	258	250	+3.2%	721.58	278.60	0.4	1.0
Auvergne No. 76	January 1, 1913	381	412	−7.5%	846.86	326.97	0.4	1.0
Baildon No. 131	December 9, 1912	583	620	−6.0%	829.56	320.29	0.7	1.8
Barrier Valley No. 397	October 29, 1917	485	431	+12.5%	817.93	315.80	0.6	1.6
Battle River No. 438	December 12, 1910	1,029	1,074	−4.2%	1,056.77	408.02	1.0	2.6
Bayne No. 371	December 12, 1910	461	467	−1.3%	788.95	304.62	0.6	1.6
Beaver River No. 622	January 1, 1978	1,277	1,216	+5.0%	2,356.32	909.78	0.5	1.3
Bengough No. 40	January 1, 1913	305	281	+8.5%	1,008.64	389.44	0.3	0.78
Benson No. 35	December 13, 1909	450	472	−4.7%	808.53	312.18	0.6	1.6
Big Arm No. 251	December 11, 1911	184	191	−3.7%	689.35	266.16	0.3	0.78
Big Quill No. 308	December 13, 1909	520	534	−2.6%	730.34	281.99	0.7	1.8
Big River No. 555	October 1, 1977	994	889	+11.8%	2,484.13	959.13	0.4	1.0
Big Stick No. 141	December 11, 1911	148	136	+8.8%	831.87	321.19	0.2	0.52
Biggar No. 347	December 11, 1911	805	798	+0.9%	1,576.09	608.53	0.5	1.3
Birch Hills No. 460	December 11, 1911	658	656	+0.3%	547.08	211.23	1.2	3.1
Bjorkdale No. 426	January 1, 1913	906	851	+6.5%	1,438.66	555.47	0.6	1.6
Blaine Lake No. 434	December 9, 1912	301	281	+7.1%	771.86	298.02	0.4	1.0
Blucher No. 343	December 13, 1909	1,984	2,006	−1.1%	789.40	304.79	2.5	6.5
Bone Creek No. 108	December 11, 1911	362	394	−8.1%	834.81	322.32	0.4	1.0
Bratt's Lake No. 129	January 1, 1913	328	315	+4.1%	844.71	326.14	0.4	1.0
Britannia No. 502	December 13, 1909	2,061	2,153	−4.3%	915.11	353.33	2.3	6.0
Brock No. 64	December 12, 1910	252	267	−5.6%	784.64	302.95	0.3	0.78
Brokenshell No. 68	December 13, 1909	307	312	−1.6%	845.97	326.63	0.4	1.0
Browning No. 34	December 11, 1911	355	375	−5.3%	797.00	307.72	0.4	1.0
Buchanan No. 304	January 1, 1913	330	270	+22.2%	708.27	273.46	0.5	1.3
Buckland No. 491	December 11, 1911	3,277	3,375	−2.9%	787.35	304.00	4.2	11
Buffalo No. 409	December 13, 1909	420	506	−17.0%	1,204.97	465.24	0.3	0.78
Calder No. 241	January 1, 1913	344	370	−7.0%	790.93	305.38	0.4	1.0
Caledonia No. 99	December 13, 1909	225	245	−8.2%	846.76	326.94	0.3	0.78
Cambria No. 6	December 13, 1909	277	309	−10.4%	813.31	314.02	0.3	0.78
Cana No. 214	December 13, 1909	904	867	+4.3%	813.42	314.06	1.1	2.8
Canaan No. 225	January 1, 1913	145	140	+3.6%	549.95	212.34	0.3	0.78
Canwood No. 494	January 1, 1913	1,351	1,381	−2.2%	1,919.39	741.08	0.7	1.8
Carmichael No. 109	December 9, 1912	462	502	−8.0%	839.45	324.11	0.6	1.6
Caron No. 162	December 9, 1912	603	576	+4.7%	566.74	218.82	1.1	2.8
Chaplin No. 164	January 1, 1913	127	113	+12.4%	837.96	323.54	0.2	0.52
Chester No. 125	December 13, 1909	333	383	−13.1%	817.66	315.70	0.4	1.0
Chesterfield No. 261	December 9, 1912	419	481	−12.9%	1,962.21	757.61	0.2	0.52
Churchbridge No. 211	January 1, 1913	584	619	−5.7%	899.13	347.16	0.6	1.6
Clayton No. 333	January 1, 1913	631	597	+5.7%	1,380.68	533.08	0.5	1.3
Clinworth No. 230	December 9, 1912	168	154	+9.1%	1,436.33	554.57	0.1	0.26
Coalfields No. 4	January 1, 1913	330	368	−10.3%	818.16	315.89	0.4	1.0
Colonsay No. 342	December 13, 1909	260	269	−3.3%	548.46	211.76	0.5	1.3
Connaught No. 457	December 11, 1911	491	586	−16.2%	848.82	327.73	0.6	1.6
Corman Park No. 344	January 1, 1970	8,909	8,558	+4.1%	1,893.24	730.98	4.7	12
Cote No. 271	December 12, 1910	616	548	+12.4%	871.02	336.30	0.7	1.8
Coteau No. 255	December 12, 1910	401	475	−15.6%	895.72	345.84	0.4	1.0
Coulee No. 136	December 12, 1910	669	563	+18.8%	840.54	324.53	0.8	2.1
Craik No. 222	December 9, 1912	272	259	+5.0%	868.48	335.32	0.3	0.78
Cupar No. 218	December 13, 1909	516	503	+2.6%	905.53	349.63	0.6	1.6
Cut Knife No. 439	December 13, 1909	415	364	+14.0%	651.33	251.48	0.6	1.6
Cymri No. 36	December 13, 1909	568	549	+3.5%	816.38	315.21	0.7	1.8
Deer Forks No. 232	January 1, 1913	208	209	−0.5%	736.87	284.51	0.3	0.78
Douglas No. 436	December 13, 1909	342	350	−2.3%	814.37	314.43	0.4	1.0
Duck Lake No. 463	January 1, 1913	1,010	955	+5.8%	1,034.52	399.43	1.0	2.6
Dufferin No. 190	December 9, 1912	454	559	−18.8%	949.88	366.75	0.5	1.3
Dundurn No. 314	December 13, 1909	2,101	2,404	−12.6%	799.97	308.87	2.6	6.7
Eagle Creek No. 376	December 13, 1909	643	595	+8.1%	822.29	317.49	0.8	2.1
Edenwold No. 158	December 9, 1912	4,466	4,490	−0.5%	848.84	327.74	5.3	14
Elcapo No. 154	December 12, 1910	392	488	−19.7%	824.30	318.26	0.5	1.3
Eldon No. 471	December 13, 1909	700	750	−6.7%	991.15	382.69	0.7	1.8
Elfros No. 307	December 13, 1909	373	391	−4.6%	687.56	265.47	0.5	1.3
Elmsthorpe No. 100	December 12, 1910	195	226	−13.7%	824.15	318.21	0.2	0.52
Emerald No. 277	December 12, 1910	370	405	−8.6%	807.18	311.65	0.5	1.3
Enfield No. 194	December 13, 1909	268	226	+18.6%	1,003.93	387.62	0.3	0.78
Enniskillen No. 3	December 13, 1909	422	459	−8.1%	820.04	316.62	0.5	1.3
Enterprise No. 142	April 18, 1913	110	110	0.0%	998.47	385.51	0.1	0.26
Estevan No. 5	December 12, 1910	1,279	1,370	−6.6%	772.00	298.07	1.7	4.4
Excel No. 71	January 1, 1913	411	391	+5.1%	1,093.31	422.13	0.4	1.0
Excelsior No. 166	December 13, 1909	808	806	+0.2%	1,196.48	461.96	0.7	1.8
Eye Hill No. 382	December 12, 1910	552	590	−6.4%	775.85	299.56	0.7	1.8
Eyebrow No. 193	December 13, 1909	220	195	+12.8%	830.73	320.75	0.3	0.78
Fertile Belt No. 183	January 1, 1913	727	781	−6.9%	1,001.93	386.85	0.7	1.8
Fertile Valley No. 285	December 13, 1909	604	539	+12.1%	1,010.19	390.04	0.6	1.6
Fillmore No. 96	December 13, 1909	224	223	+0.4%	815.57	314.89	0.3	0.78
Fish Creek No. 402	January 1, 1913	364	345	+5.5%	583.95	225.46	0.6	1.6
Flett's Springs No. 429	December 13, 1909	656	732	−10.4%	838.98	323.93	0.8	2.1
Foam Lake No. 276	December 12, 1910	532	529	+0.6%	1,284.41	495.91	0.4	1.0
Fox Valley No. 171	October 29, 1913	344	330	+4.2%	1,253.40	483.94	0.3	0.78
Francis No. 127	December 13, 1909	701	674	+4.0%	1,077.36	415.97	0.7	1.8
Frenchman Butte No. 501	January 1, 1954	1,250	1,494	−16.3%	1,902.15	734.42	0.7	1.8
Frontier No. 19	January 1, 1913	347	326	+6.4%	1,631.39	629.88	0.2	0.52
Garden River No. 490	January 1, 1913	647	671	−3.6%	656.60	253.51	1.0	2.6
Garry No. 245	January 1, 1913	370	364	+1.6%	790.20	305.10	0.5	1.3
Glen Bain No. 105	December 11, 1911	195	180	+8.3%	827.17	319.37	0.2	0.52
Glen McPherson No. 46	January 1, 1913	76	72	+5.6%	845.13	326.31	0.1	0.26
Glenside No. 377	December 13, 1909	206	248	−16.9%	883.96	341.30	0.2	0.52
Golden West No. 95	December 13, 1909	289	291	−0.7%	781.59	301.77	0.4	1.0
Good Lake No. 274	January 1, 1913	930	747	+24.5%	773.54	298.67	1.2	3.1
Grandview No. 349	December 11, 1911	230	348	−33.9%	709.49	273.94	0.3	0.78
Grant No. 372	December 13, 1909	525	466	+12.7%	659.69	254.71	0.8	2.1
Grass Lake No. 381	December 13, 1909	389	399	−2.5%	772.90	298.42	0.5	1.3
Grassy Creek No. 78	January 1, 1913	341	364	−6.3%	831.45	321.02	0.4	1.0
Gravelbourg No. 104	December 9, 1912	317	372	−14.8%	824.45	318.32	0.4	1.0
Grayson No. 184	January 1, 1913	547	512	+6.8%	862.80	333.13	0.6	1.6
Great Bend No. 405	December 12, 1910	381	509	−25.1%	825.90	318.88	0.5	1.3
Griffin No. 66	December 13, 1909	430	438	−1.8%	801.27	309.37	0.5	1.3
Gull Lake No. 139	January 1, 1913	185	201	−8.0%	828.48	319.88	0.2	0.52
Happy Valley No. 10	January 1, 1913	125	139	−10.1%	806.93	311.56	0.2	0.52
Happyland No. 231	January 1, 1913	285	249	+14.5%	1,269.18	490.03	0.2	0.52
Harris No. 316	December 12, 1910	205	193	+6.2%	807.34	311.72	0.3	0.78
Hart Butte No. 11	January 1, 1913	263	252	+4.4%	839.22	324.02	0.3	0.78
Hazel Dell No. 335	January 1, 1913	511	515	−0.8%	1,358.45	524.50	0.4	1.0
Hazelwood No. 94	January 1, 1913	244	230	+6.1%	714.41	275.84	0.3	0.78
Heart's Hill No. 352	November 15, 1910	234	244	−4.1%	826.01	318.92	0.3	0.78
Hillsborough No. 132	January 1, 1913	97	101	−4.0%	434.18	167.64	0.2	0.52
Hillsdale No. 440	January 1, 1913	528	553	−4.5%	1,014.77	391.80	0.5	1.3
Hoodoo No. 401	January 1, 1913	802	675	+18.8%	786.69	303.74	1.0	2.6
Hudson Bay No. 394	May 1, 1977	1,145	1,092	+4.9%	12,399.12	4,787.33	0.1	0.26
Humboldt No. 370	January 1, 1913	961	935	+2.8%	780.28	301.27	1.2	3.1
Huron No. 223	December 12, 1910	205	198	+3.5%	830.68	320.73	0.2	0.52
Indian Head No. 156	August 6, 1884	362	336	+7.7%	745.38	287.79	0.5	1.3
Insinger No. 275	January 1, 1913	305	315	−3.2%	808.55	312.18	0.4	1.0
Invergordon No. 430	December 11, 1911	563	565	−0.4%	844.71	326.14	0.7	1.8
Invermay No. 305	December 11, 1911	269	325	−17.2%	694.14	268.01	0.4	1.0
Ituna Bon Accord No. 246	January 1, 1913	327	374	−12.6%	788.73	304.53	0.4	1.0
Kellross No. 247	December 13, 1909	396	395	+0.3%	809.22	312.44	0.5	1.3
Kelvington No. 366	January 1, 1913	366	398	−8.0%	853.13	329.40	0.4	1.0
Key West No. 70	December 12, 1910	251	255	−1.6%	786.65	303.73	0.3	0.78
Keys No. 303	January 1, 1913	548	416	+31.7%	656.49	253.47	0.8	2.1
Kindersley No. 290	December 12, 1910	1,003	1,049	−4.4%	2,164.53	835.73	0.5	1.3
King George No. 256	December 11, 1911	178	226	−21.2%	820.32	316.73	0.2	0.52
Kingsley No. 124	December 12, 1910	396	444	−10.8%	828.77	319.99	0.5	1.3
Kinistino No. 459	December 11, 1911	604	554	+9.0%	921.69	355.87	0.7	1.8
Lac Pelletier No. 107	January 1, 1913	563	546	+3.1%	841.37	324.85	0.7	1.8
Lacadena No. 228	December 12, 1910	787	535	+47.1%	1,896.92	732.40	0.4	1.0
Laird No. 404	December 12, 1910	1,304	1,387	−6.0%	725.42	280.09	1.8	4.7
Lajord No. 128	December 13, 1909	985	1,232	−20.0%	945.10	364.91	1.0	2.6
Lake Alma No. 8	May 5, 1913	269	272	−1.1%	785.50	303.28	0.3	0.78
Lake Johnston No. 102	December 9, 1912	140	170	−17.6%	555.80	214.60	0.3	0.78
Lake Lenore No. 399	January 1, 1913	506	587	−13.8%	714.17	275.74	0.7	1.8
Lake of the Rivers No. 72	December 11, 1911	252	279	−9.7%	665.26	256.86	0.4	1.0
Lakeland No. 521	August 1, 1977	1,300	915	+42.1%	488.65	188.67	2.7	7.0
Lakeside No. 338	December 12, 1910	396	415	−4.6%	653.88	252.46	0.6	1.6
Lakeview No. 337	December 13, 1909	366	368	−0.5%	709.10	273.79	0.5	1.3
Langenburg No. 181	January 1, 1913	561	557	+0.7%	656.42	253.45	0.9	2.3
Last Mountain Valley No. 250	December 13, 1909	339	275	+23.3%	858.96	331.65	0.4	1.0
Laurier No. 38	December 13, 1909	253	296	−14.5%	816.25	315.16	0.3	0.78
Lawtonia No. 135	December 12, 1910	356	346	+2.9%	843.24	325.58	0.4	1.0
Leask No. 464	December 9, 1912	857	681	+25.8%	1,195.54	461.60	0.7	1.8
Leroy No. 339	January 1, 1913	457	502	−9.0%	831.54	321.06	0.5	1.3
Lipton No. 217	December 11, 1911	388	381	+1.8%	805.35	310.95	0.5	1.3
Livingston No. 331	January 1, 1913	281	281	0.0%	1,326.24	512.06	0.2	0.52
Lomond No. 37	December 11, 1911	275	296	−7.1%	825.60	318.77	0.3	0.78
Lone Tree No. 18	December 8, 1913	140	150	−6.7%	821.40	317.14	0.2	0.52
Longlaketon No. 219	December 12, 1910	1,096	1,016	+7.9%	1,022.45	394.77	1.1	2.8
Loon Lake No. 561	January 1, 1978	836	756	+10.6%	3,148.06	1,215.47	0.3	0.78
Loreburn No. 254	December 12, 1910	380	327	+16.2%	958.42	370.05	0.4	1.0
Lost River No. 313	December 11, 1911	252	242	+4.1%	549.96	212.34	0.5	1.3
Lumsden No. 189	December 9, 1912	1,968	1,938	+1.5%	816.17	315.12	2.4	6.2
Manitou Lake No. 442	December 12, 1910	505	573	−11.9%	839.29	324.05	0.6	1.6
Mankota No. 45	January 1, 1913	289	292	−1.0%	1,693.17	653.74	0.2	0.52
Maple Bush No. 224	December 13, 1909	213	192	+10.9%	818.05	315.85	0.3	0.78
Maple Creek No. 111	December 10, 1917	1,167	1,063	+9.8%	3,180.10	1,227.84	0.4	1.0
Mariposa No. 350	December 12, 1910	291	205	+42.0%	635.16	245.24	0.5	1.3
Marquis No. 191	December 11, 1911	303	312	−2.9%	781.48	301.73	0.4	1.0
Marriott No. 317	December 12, 1910	349	366	−4.6%	832.54	321.45	0.4	1.0
Martin No. 122	January 1, 1913	254	289	−12.1%	542.27	209.37	0.5	1.3
Maryfield No. 91	December 9, 1912	258	324	−20.4%	748.67	289.06	0.3	0.78
Mayfield No. 406	December 13, 1909	391	377	+3.7%	780.54	301.37	0.5	1.3
McCraney No. 282	December 13, 1909	280	310	−9.7%	944.47	364.66	0.3	0.78
McKillop No. 220	December 13, 1909	897	732	+22.5%	663.90	256.33	1.4	3.6
McLeod No. 185	January 1, 1913	401	365	+9.9%	872.52	336.88	0.5	1.3
Meadow Lake No. 588	February 1, 1976	2,553	2,476	+3.1%	6,231.27	2,405.91	0.4	1.0
Medstead No. 497	January 1, 1913	489	508	−3.7%	1,195.14	461.45	0.4	1.0
Meeting Lake No. 466	January 1, 1913	335	319	+5.0%	1,043.34	402.84	0.3	0.78
Meota No. 468	December 13, 1909	1,110	933	+19.0%	642.11	247.92	1.7	4.4
Mervin No. 499	January 1, 1913	1,711	1,256	+36.2%	1,581.66	610.68	1.1	2.8
Milden No. 286	December 12, 1910	280	327	−14.4%	732.95	282.99	0.4	1.0
Milton No. 292	December 11, 1911	249	266	−6.4%	672.17	259.53	0.4	1.0
Miry Creek No. 229	January 1, 1913	378	370	+2.2%	1,227.72	474.03	0.3	0.78
Monet No. 257	December 13, 1909	432	445	−2.9%	1,587.99	613.13	0.3	0.78
Montmartre No. 126	December 13, 1909	350	483	−27.5%	817.75	315.74	0.4	1.0
Montrose No. 315	December 13, 1909	647	712	−9.1%	897.57	346.55	0.7	1.8
Moose Creek No. 33	December 12, 1910	306	379	−19.3%	828.74	319.98	0.4	1.0
Moose Jaw No. 161	December 11, 1911	1,207	1,143	+5.6%	777.62	300.24	1.6	4.1
Moose Mountain No. 63	December 11, 1911	489	492	−0.6%	718.23	277.31	0.7	1.8
Moose Range No. 486	December 11, 1916	942	1,000	−5.8%	2,423.98	935.90	0.4	1.0
Moosomin No. 121	January 1, 1913	541	603	−10.3%	545.78	210.73	1.0	2.6
Morris No. 312	December 13, 1909	263	290	−9.3%	842.62	325.34	0.3	0.78
Morse No. 165	December 11, 1911	396	427	−7.3%	1,232.65	475.93	0.3	0.78
Mount Hope No. 279	December 11, 1911	531	531	0.0%	1,624.57	627.25	0.3	0.78
Mount Pleasant No. 2	December 11, 1911	345	414	−16.7%	772.71	298.34	0.4	1.0
Mountain View No. 318	December 13, 1909	358	337	+6.2%	847.02	327.04	0.4	1.0
Newcombe No. 260	December 11, 1911	356	342	+4.1%	1,094.64	422.64	0.3	0.78
Nipawin No. 487	December 9, 1912	958	1,004	−4.6%	879.63	339.63	1.1	2.8
North Battleford No. 437	December 12, 1910	687	725	−5.2%	792.18	305.86	0.9	2.3
North Qu'Appelle No. 187	December 12, 1910	918	855	+7.4%	489.53	189.01	1.9	4.9
Norton No. 69	December 13, 1909	233	233	0.0%	808.81	312.28	0.3	0.78
Oakdale No. 320	December 13, 1909	216	253	−14.6%	826.79	319.23	0.3	0.78
Old Post No. 43	January 1, 1967	352	377	−6.6%	1,757.50	678.57	0.2	0.52
Orkney No. 244	January 1, 1913	1,883	1,875	+0.4%	770.05	297.32	2.4	6.2
Paddockwood No. 520	January 1, 1978	1,071	900	+19.0%	2,450.94	946.31	0.4	1.0
Parkdale No. 498	January 1, 1913	725	621	+16.7%	1,375.62	531.13	0.5	1.3
Paynton No. 470	January 1, 1913	238	255	−6.7%	588.62	227.27	0.4	1.0
Pense No. 160	January 1, 1913	441	508	−13.2%	840.18	324.40	0.5	1.3
Perdue No. 346	December 13, 1909	471	445	+5.8%	818.49	316.02	0.6	1.6
Piapot No. 110	December 8, 1913	280	302	−7.3%	1,942.87	750.15	0.1	0.26
Pinto Creek No. 75	January 1, 1913	251	288	−12.8%	838.82	323.87	0.3	0.78
Pittville No. 169	January 1, 1913	201	208	−3.4%	1,256.42	485.11	0.2	0.52
Pleasant Valley No. 288	December 11, 1911	301	302	−0.3%	822.47	317.56	0.4	1.0
Pleasantdale No. 398	December 11, 1911	599	596	+0.5%	755.60	291.74	0.8	2.1
Ponass Lake No. 367	January 1, 1913	416	422	−1.4%	795.56	307.17	0.5	1.3
Poplar Valley No. 12	January 1, 1913	190	195	−2.6%	765.28	295.48	0.2	0.52
Porcupine No. 395	February 28, 1944	736	803	−8.3%	2,316.38	894.36	0.3	0.78
Prairie Rose No. 309	December 12, 1910	195	220	−11.4%	837.66	323.42	0.2	0.52
Prairiedale No. 321	December 13, 1909	246	247	−0.4%	556.20	214.75	0.4	1.0
Preeceville No. 334	January 1, 1913	966	919	+5.1%	1,368.92	528.54	0.7	1.8
Prince Albert No. 461	December 9, 1912	3,438	3,562	−3.5%	1,010.10	390.00	3.4	8.8
Progress No. 351	December 12, 1910	265	268	−1.1%	788.45	304.42	0.3	0.78
Reciprocity No. 32	December 11, 1911	351	344	+2.0%	707.95	273.34	0.5	1.3
Redberry No. 435	January 1, 1913	372	342	+8.8%	1,003.09	387.30	0.4	1.0
Redburn No. 130	January 1, 1913	253	250	+1.2%	845.89	326.60	0.3	0.78
Reford No. 379	December 12, 1910	222	257	−13.6%	695.85	268.67	0.3	0.78
Reno No. 51	December 11, 1911	343	379	−9.5%	3,424.73	1,322.30	0.1	0.26
Riverside No. 168	January 1, 1913	436	477	−8.6%	1,307.46	504.81	0.3	0.78
Rocanville No. 151	December 9, 1912	544	507	+7.3%	748.04	288.82	0.7	1.8
Rodgers No. 133	December 9, 1912	105	90	+16.7%	697.18	269.18	0.2	0.52
Rosedale No. 283	December 13, 1909	542	526	+3.0%	923.87	356.71	0.6	1.6
Rosemount No. 378	December 12, 1910	175	201	−12.9%	561.28	216.71	0.3	0.78
Rosthern No. 403	December 9, 1912	2,473	2,300	+7.5%	944.28	364.59	2.6	6.7
Round Hill No. 467	December 11, 1911	394	361	+9.1%	809.51	312.55	0.5	1.3
Round Valley No. 410	December 13, 1909	384	423	−9.2%	795.72	307.23	0.5	1.3
Rudy No. 284	December 13, 1909	475	466	+1.9%	807.31	311.70	0.6	1.6
Saltcoats No. 213	December 9, 1912	743	712	+4.4%	824.85	318.48	0.9	2.3
Sarnia No. 221	December 13, 1909	326	322	+1.2%	863.89	333.55	0.4	1.0
Saskatchewan Landing No. 167	January 1, 1913	434	415	+4.6%	792.73	306.07	0.5	1.3
Sasman No. 336	January 1, 1913	813	765	+6.3%	984.26	380.02	0.8	2.1
Scott No. 98	December 13, 1909	215	195	+10.3%	846.58	326.87	0.3	0.78
Senlac No. 411	January 1, 1913	198	216	−8.3%	1,007.30	388.92	0.2	0.52
Shamrock No. 134	December 9, 1912	194	205	−5.4%	761.86	294.16	0.3	0.78
Shellbrook No. 493	January 1, 1913	1,581	1,587	−0.4%	1,213.96	468.71	1.3	3.4
Sherwood No. 159	December 11, 1911	1,219	974	+25.2%	656.66	253.54	1.9	4.9
Silverwood No. 123	October 31, 1911	355	410	−13.4%	827.96	319.68	0.4	1.0
Sliding Hills No. 273	January 1, 1913	438	421	+4.0%	820.70	316.87	0.5	1.3
Snipe Lake No. 259	December 11, 1911	410	396	+3.5%	1,615.91	623.91	0.3	0.78
Souris Valley No. 7	December 13, 1909	220	249	−11.6%	804.48	310.61	0.3	0.78
South Qu'Appelle No. 157	August 6, 1884	1,231	1,275	−3.5%	877.75	338.90	1.4	3.6
Spalding No. 368	December 11, 1911	420	453	−7.3%	811.15	313.19	0.5	1.3
Spiritwood No. 496	December 9, 1929	1,245	1,223	+1.8%	2,371.04	915.46	0.5	1.3
Spy Hill No. 152	December 11, 1911	383	323	+18.6%	646.54	249.63	0.6	1.6
St. Andrews No. 287	December 12, 1910	461	522	−11.7%	807.82	311.90	0.6	1.6
St. Louis No. 431	January 1, 1913	1,029	1,086	−5.2%	777.51	300.20	1.3	3.4
St. Peter No. 369	December 11, 1911	723	773	−6.5%	827.39	319.46	0.9	2.3
St. Philips No. 301	January 1, 1913	200	220	−9.1%	647.80	250.12	0.3	0.78
Stanley No. 215	January 1, 1913	508	505	+0.6%	824.95	318.51	0.6	1.6
Star City No. 428	January 1, 1913	811	918	−11.7%	822.81	317.69	1.0	2.6
Stonehenge No. 73	December 11, 1911	385	380	+1.3%	956.43	369.28	0.4	1.0
Storthoaks No. 31	December 11, 1911	281	292	−3.8%	551.21	212.82	0.5	1.3
Surprise Valley No. 9	January 1, 1913	211	217	−2.8%	802.64	309.90	0.3	0.78
Sutton No. 103	December 11, 1911	230	240	−4.2%	792.29	305.90	0.3	0.78
Swift Current No. 137	December 12, 1910	1,995	1,932	+3.3%	1,100.47	424.89	1.8	4.7
Tecumseh No. 65	December 13, 1909	255	271	−5.9%	798.92	308.46	0.3	0.78
Terrell No. 101	January 1, 1913	210	241	−12.9%	837.04	323.18	0.3	0.78
The Gap No. 39	December 12, 1903	181	199	−9.0%	795.76	307.24	0.2	0.52
Three Lakes No. 400	January 1, 1913	725	598	+21.2%	770.76	297.59	0.9	2.3
Tisdale No. 427	December 9, 1912	885	911	−2.9%	843.02	325.49	1.0	2.6
Torch River No. 488	January 1, 1950	1,219	1,471	−17.1%	5,145.75	1,986.79	0.2	0.52
Touchwood No. 248	December 12, 1910	373	343	+8.7%	684.57	264.31	0.5	1.3
Tramping Lake No. 380	December 12, 1910	402	375	+7.2%	605.12	233.64	0.7	1.8
Tullymet No. 216	January 1, 1913	183	200	−8.5%	555.62	214.53	0.3	0.78
Turtle River No. 469	December 9, 1912	307	339	−9.4%	655.72	253.17	0.5	1.3
Usborne No. 310	December 13, 1909	511	529	−3.4%	806.11	311.24	0.6	1.6
Val Marie No. 17	January 1, 1969	425	413	+2.9%	3,059.22	1,181.17	0.1	0.26
Vanscoy No. 345	December 13, 1909	2,799	2,840	−1.4%	861.10	332.47	3.3	8.5
Victory No. 226	December 8, 1919	434	380	+14.2%	1,360.62	525.34	0.3	0.78
Viscount No. 341	December 13, 1909	320	338	−5.3%	828.55	319.90	0.4	1.0
Wallace No. 243	December 11, 1911	881	852	+3.4%	814.69	314.55	1.1	2.8
Walpole No. 92	December 12, 1910	292	326	−10.4%	832.36	321.38	0.4	1.0
Waverley No. 44	February 1, 1913	295	336	−12.2%	1,425.78	550.50	0.2	0.52
Wawken No. 93	January 1, 1913	614	571	+7.5%	743.50	287.07	0.8	2.1
Webb No. 138	December 13, 1909	567	541	+4.8%	1,101.92	425.45	0.5	1.3
Wellington No. 97	December 13, 1909	274	371	−26.1%	831.16	320.91	0.3	0.78
Weyburn No. 67	December 13, 1909	1,103	1,064	+3.7%	808.50	312.16	1.4	3.6
Wheatlands No. 163	December 13, 1909	157	149	+5.4%	818.63	316.07	0.2	0.52
Whiska Creek No. 106	January 1, 1913	512	465	+10.1%	845.65	326.51	0.6	1.6
White Valley No. 49	January 1, 1913	352	478	−26.4%	2,001.56	772.81	0.2	0.52
Willner No. 253	January 1, 1913	293	255	+14.9%	836.21	322.86	0.4	1.0
Willow Bunch No. 42	November 21, 1912	285	306	−6.9%	1,037.04	400.40	0.3	0.78
Willow Creek No. 458	December 9, 1912	683	630	+8.4%	838.86	323.89	0.8	2.1
Willowdale No. 153	January 1, 1913	248	294	−15.6%	594.03	229.36	0.4	1.0
Wilton No. 472	December 13, 1909	1,473	1,629	−9.6%	1,022.90	394.94	1.4	3.6
Winslow No. 319	December 13, 1909	344	344	0.0%	814.35	314.42	0.4	1.0
Wise Creek No. 77	January 1, 1913	188	205	−8.3%	822.49	317.57	0.2	0.52
Wolseley No. 155	December 13, 1909	366	372	−1.6%	758.46	292.84	0.5	1.3
Wolverine No. 340	December 13, 1909	511	480	+6.5%	828.06	319.72	0.6	1.6
Wood Creek No. 281	December 13, 1909	205	224	−8.5%	829.78	320.38	0.2	0.52
Wood River No. 74	December 9, 1912	466	433	+7.6%	824.84	318.47	0.6	1.6
Wreford No. 280	December 12, 1910	140	135	+3.7%	793.30	306.29	0.2	0.52
Total rural municipalities		176,316	176,499	−0.1%	304,528.21	117,579.00	0.6	1.6

== Northern municipalities ==
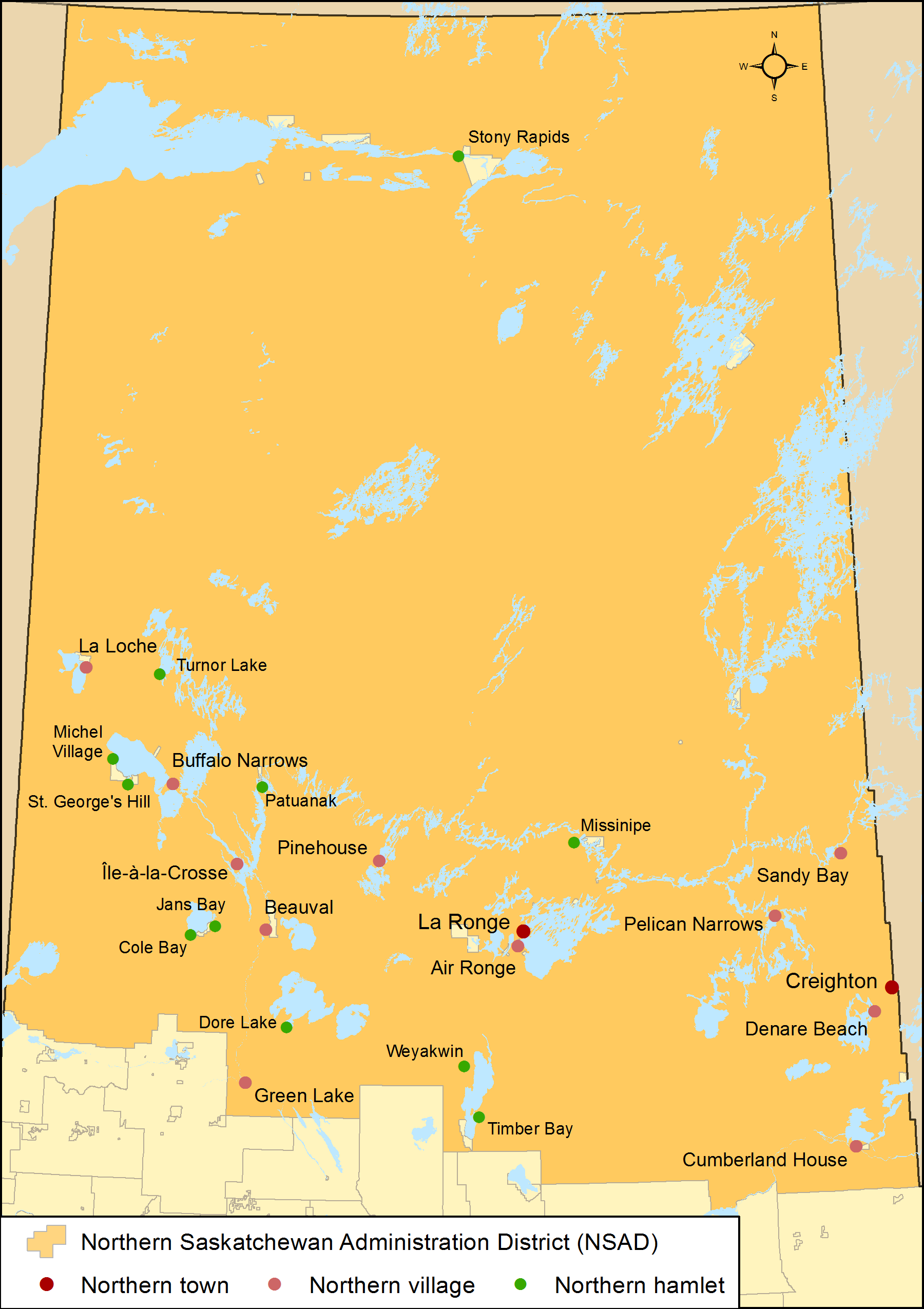
Distribution of Saskatchewan's 2 northern towns, 11 northern villages and 11 northern hamlets within the Northern Saskatchewan Administration District (2013)

Saskatchewan has 24 northern municipalities, which includes the sub-types of northern towns, northern villages and northern hamlets, that are located within the Northern Saskatchewan Administration District (NSAD). Administration of northern towns, northern villages and northern hamlets is regulated by The Northern Municipalities Act. Under this act:

- a northern town may be formed from a northern village if it has a permanent resident population of at least 500;
- a northern village may be formed from a northern hamlet if it has a permanent resident population of at least 100 and contains at least 50 separate dwelling units or business premises; and
- a northern hamlet may be formed from an unincorporated northern settlement if it has a permanent population of at least 50 and contains at least 25 separate dwelling units or business premises.

Saskatchewan has 2 northern towns, 11 northern villages and 11 northern hamlets. The largest and smallest northern municipalities by population are La Ronge (a northern town) and Michel Village (a northern hamlet) with 2,521 and 37. The largest and smallest northern municipalities by land area are Green Lake and Black Point with 121.18 km^{2} (46.79 mi^{2}) and 0.69 km^{2} (0.27 mi^{2}).

List of northern municipalities in Saskatchewan
Name	Status	Incorporation date	2021 Census of Population						
Name	Status	Incorporation date	Population (2021)	Population (2016)	Change	Land area		Population density	
Name	Status	Incorporation date	Population (2021)	Population (2016)	Change	km^{2}	sq mi	/km^{2}	/sq mi
Creighton	Northern town	October 1, 1983	1,203	1,429	−15.8%	12.92	4.99	93.1	241
La Ronge	Northern town	May 3, 1905	2,521	2,688	−6.2%	16.71	6.45	150.9	391
Air Ronge	Northern village	July 13, 1977	1,365	1,199	+13.8%	6.00	2.32	227.5	589
Beauval	Northern village	November 14, 1969	685	640	+7.0%	14.72	5.68	46.5	120
Buffalo Narrows	Northern village	April 15, 1965	1,014	1,110	−8.6%	68.04	26.27	14.9	39
Cumberland House	Northern village	April 15, 1965	540	791	−31.7%	16.11	6.22	33.5	87
Denare Beach	Northern village	October 1, 1983	699	709	−1.4%	6.40	2.47	109.2	283
Green Lake	Northern village	August 20, 1973	411	429	−4.2%	121.18	46.79	3.4	8.8
Île-à-la-Crosse	Northern village	April 15, 1965	1,425	1,296	+10.0%	23.30	9.00	61.2	159
La Loche	Northern village	November 19, 1968	2,514	2,444	+2.9%	15.47	5.97	162.5	421
Pelican Narrows	Northern village	October 1, 1983	123	178	−30.9%	2.40	0.93	51.3	133
Pinehouse	Northern village	July 6, 1979	1,013	1,074	−5.7%	6.77	2.61	149.6	387
Sandy Bay	Northern village	April 15, 1965	671	572	+17.3%	11.42	4.41	58.8	152
Black Point	Northern hamlet	March 26, 2008	39	43	−9.3%	0.69	0.27	56.5	146
Cole Bay	Northern hamlet	November 1, 1983	194	170	+14.1%	4.86	1.88	39.9	103
Dore Lake	Northern hamlet	January 11, 1985	37	30	+23.3%	7.94	3.07	4.7	12
Jans Bay	Northern hamlet	October 1, 1983	116	152	−23.7%	6.09	2.35	19.0	49
Michel Village	Northern hamlet	November 1, 1983	37	86	−57.0%	3.81	1.47	9.7	25
Patuanak	Northern hamlet	December 1, 1983	63	73	−13.7%	1.09	0.42	57.8	150
St. George's Hill	Northern hamlet	December 1, 1983	77	131	−41.2%	1.68	0.65	45.8	119
Stony Rapids	Northern hamlet	April 1, 1992	219	262	−16.4%	4.24	1.64	51.7	134
Timber Bay	Northern hamlet	October 1, 1983	81	82	−1.2%	5.99	2.31	13.5	35
Turnor Lake	Northern hamlet	October 1, 1984	154	149	+3.4%	5.07	1.96	30.4	79
Weyakwin	Northern hamlet	December 1, 1983	100	102	−2.0%	5.27	2.03	19.0	49
Sub-total northern towns			3,724	4,117	−9.5%	29.63	11.44	125.7	326
Sub-total northern villages			10,460	10,442	+0.2%	291.81	112.67	35.8	93
Sub-total northern hamlets			1,117	1,280	−12.7%	46.73	18.04	23.9	62
Total northern municipalities			15,301	15,839	−3.4%	368.17	142.15	41.6	108

== See also ==
- List of census agglomerations in Saskatchewan
- List of communities in Saskatchewan
- List of designated places in Saskatchewan
- List of ghost towns in Saskatchewan
- List of hamlets in Saskatchewan
- List of Indian reserves in Saskatchewan
- List of population centres in Saskatchewan
