= South Lake, Saskatchewan =

South Lake
- Resort village
- Resort Village of South Lake
- Location within Saskatchewan
- Coordinates: 50.678°N 105.566°W
- Country: Canada
- Province: Saskatchewan
- Census division: 7
- Rural municipality: RM of Marquis No. 191
- Incorporated: January 1, 1989

Government
  - Mayor: Art Schick
  - Governing body: Resort Village Council
  - Administrator: Melinda Huebner

Area (2016)
  - Land: 1.15 km^{2} (0.44 sq mi)

Population (2016)
  - Total: 169
  - Density: 32.4/km^{2} (84/sq mi)
- Time zone: CST
  - Summer (DST): CST
- Area codes: 306 and 639
- Waterway(s): Buffalo Pound Lake
- Website: Official website

South Lake (2016 population: 169) is a resort village in the Canadian province of Saskatchewan within Census Division No. 7. It is on the shores of Buffalo Pound Lake in the Rural Municipality of Marquis No. 191.

== History ==
South Lake incorporated as a resort village on January 1, 1989.

== Demographics ==
Population history (1981–2016)
Year	Pop.	±%
1981		—
1986		—
1991	22	—
1996	41	+86.4%
2001	47	+14.6%
2006	105	+123.4%
2011	48	−54.3%
2016	169	+252.1%
Source: Statistics Canada via Saskatchewan Bureau of Statistics

In the 2021 Census of Population conducted by Statistics Canada, South Lake had a population of 226 living in 117 of its 313 total private dwellings, a change of 33.7% from its 2016 population of 169. With a land area of 4.95 km^{2} (1.91 sq mi), it had a population density of 45.7/km^{2} (118.2/sq mi) in 2021.

In the 2016 Census of Population conducted by Statistics Canada, the Resort Village of South Lake recorded a population of 169 living in 88 of its 321 total private dwellings, a 131.5% change from its 2011 population of 73. With a land area of 5.21 km^{2} (2.01 sq mi), it had a population density of 32.4/km^{2} (84.0/sq mi) in 2016.

== Government ==
The Resort Village of South Lake is governed by an elected municipal council and an appointed administrator. The mayor is Art Schick and its administrator is Melinda Huebner.

== See also ==
- List of communities in Saskatchewan
- List of municipalities in Saskatchewan
- List of resort villages in Saskatchewan
- List of villages in Saskatchewan
- List of summer villages in Alberta
