= Waldron, Saskatchewan =

Village in Saskatchewan, Canada

Coordinates: 50°51′03″N 102°31′02″W

Location of Waldron in Saskatchewan

Waldron (2016 population: 15) is a village in the Canadian province of Saskatchewan within the Rural Municipality of Grayson No. 184 and Census Division No. 5.

== History ==
Waldron incorporated as a village on July 17, 1909.

== Demographics ==
Population history (1981–2016)
Year	Pop.	±%
1981	50	—
1986	37	−26.0%
1991	35	−5.4%
1996	24	−31.4%
2001	15	−37.5%
2006	20	+33.3%
2011	20	+0.0%
2016	15	−25.0%
Source: Statistics Canada via Saskatchewan Bureau of Statistics

In the 2021 Census of Population conducted by Statistics Canada, Waldron had a population of 15 living in 8 of its 8 total private dwellings, a change of 0% from its 2016 population of 15. With a land area of 1.38 km^{2} (0.53 sq mi), it had a population density of 10.9/km^{2} (28.2/sq mi) in 2021.

In the 2016 Census of Population, the Village of Waldron recorded a population of 15 living in 9 of its 12 total private dwellings, a -33.3% change from its 2011 population of 20. With a land area of 1.45 km^{2} (0.56 sq mi), it had a population density of 10.3/km^{2} (26.8/sq mi) in 2016.
