= Rural Municipality of Marquis No. 191 =

Rural municipality in Saskatchewan, Canada

Marquis No. 191
- Rural municipality
- Rural Municipality of Marquis No. 191
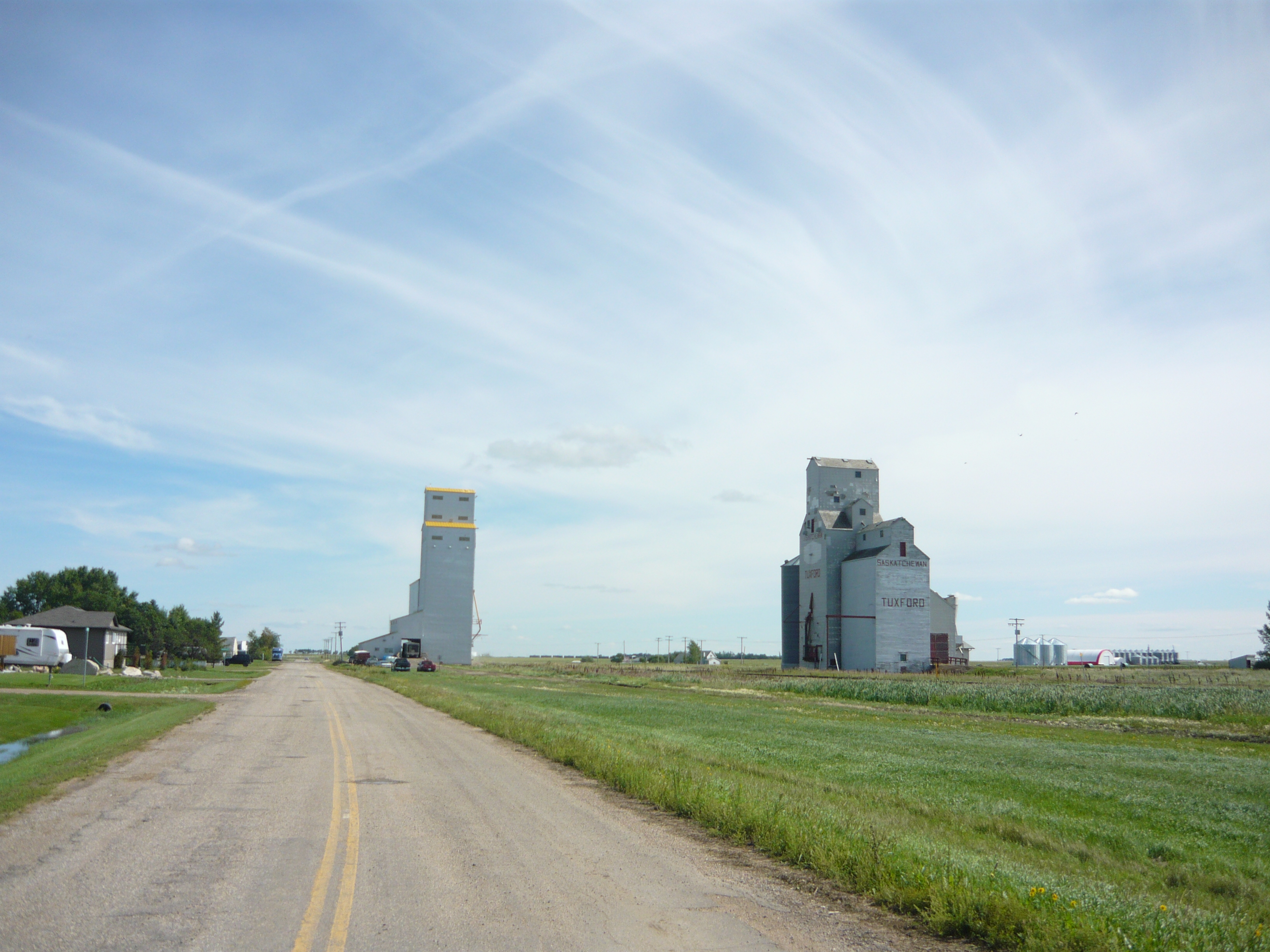
- Tuxford, a community in the RM

- Location of the RM of Marquis No. 191 in Saskatchewan
- Coordinates: 50.647°N 105.516°W
- Country: Canada
- Province: Saskatchewan
- Census division: 7
- SARM division: 2
- Formed: December 11, 1911

Government
  - Reeve: Kenneth Waldenberger
  - Governing body: RM of Marquis No. 191 Council
  - Administrator: Samantha Millard
  - Office location: Marquis

Area (2016)
  - Land: 801.42 km^{2} (309.43 sq mi)

Population (2016)
  - Total: 297
  - Density: 0.4/km^{2} (1.0/sq mi)
- Time zone: CST
  - Summer (DST): CST
- Area codes: 306 and 639

The Rural Municipality of Marquis No. 191 (2016 population: 297) is a rural municipality (RM) in the Canadian province of Saskatchewan within Census Division No. 7 and SARM Division No. 2. It is located in the south-central portion of the province.

== History ==
The RM of Marquis No. 191 incorporated as a rural municipality on December 11, 1911.

== Geography ==
=== Communities and localities ===
The following urban municipalities are surrounded by the RM.

Villages

- Marquis
- Tuxford

The following unincorporated communities are within the RM.

Organized hamlets

- Parkview

Localities

- Keeler (special service area; former village, dissolved December 31, 2020)
- South Lake
- Sun Valley

== Demographics ==
Population history (1981–2016)
Year	Pop.	±%
1981	497	—
1986	473	−4.8%
1991	478	+1.1%
1996	445	−6.9%
2001	388	−12.8%
2006	404	+4.1%
2011	252	−37.6%
2016	297	+17.9%
Source: Statistics Canada via Saskatchewan Bureau of Statistics

In the 2021 Census of Population conducted by Statistics Canada, the RM of Marquis No. 191 had a population of 303 living in 132 of its 204 total private dwellings, a change of −2.9% from its 2016 population of 312. With a land area of 781.48 km^{2} (301.73 sq mi), it had a population density of 0.4/km^{2} (1.0/sq mi) in 2021.

In the 2016 Census of Population, the RM of Marquis No. 191 recorded a population of 297 living in 127 of its 205 total private dwellings, a 40.1% change from its 2011 population of 212. With a land area of 801.42 km^{2} (309.43 sq mi), it had a population density of 0.4/km^{2} (1.0/sq mi) in 2016.

== Government ==
The RM of Marquis No. 191 is governed by an elected municipal council and an appointed administrator that meets on the second Tuesday of every month. The reeve of the RM is Kenneth Waldenberger while its administrator is Samantha Millard. The RM's office is located in Marquis.

== Gallery ==
St. Columba Anglican Church in the R.M. of Marquis

The Clinton Football team in 1908

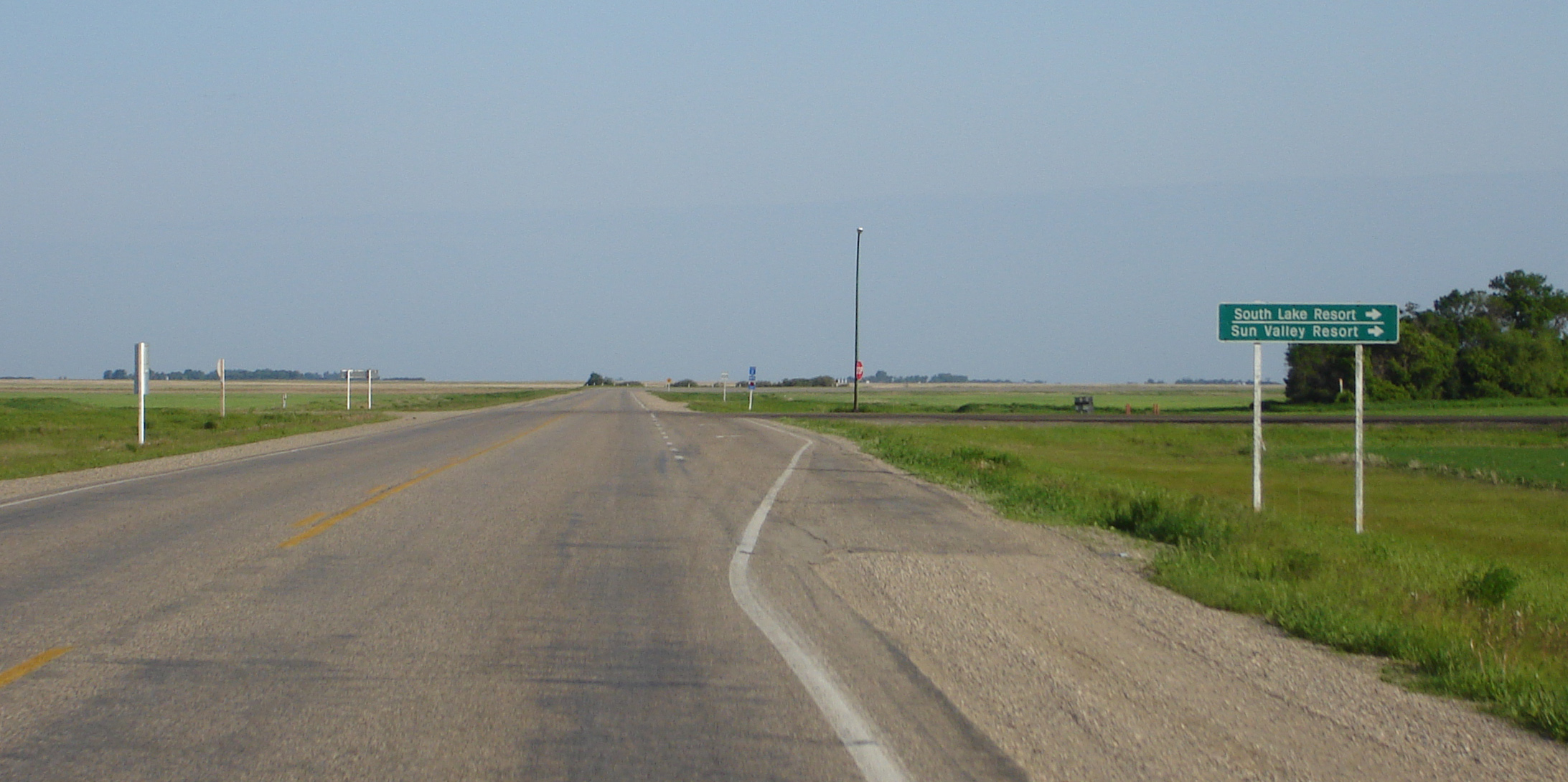
Sun Valley Resort, Saskatchewan
