= Dellwood Reservoir =

Reservoir in Saskatchewan, Canada

- Location in Saskatchewan Dellwood Reservoir (Canada)
- Location: RM of Usborne No. 310
- Coordinates: 51.8073°N 105.3323°W
- Type: Reservoir
- Part of: Red River drainage basin
- Primary inflows: Aqueduct originating at Lake Diefenbaker and Dellwood Brook
- Primary outflows: Dellwood Brook
- Basin countries: Canada
- Managing agency: Saskatchewan Water Security Agency
- Built: 1967
- First flooded: 1967
- Surface area: 191.5 ha (473 acres)
- Max. depth: 6.1 m (20 ft)
- Water volume: 5,674 dam^{3} (4,600 acre⋅ft)
- Shore length^{1}: 16 km (10 mi)
- Surface elevation: 529 m (1,736 ft)
- Settlements: None
- ^{1} Shore length is not a well-defined measure.

Dellwood Reservoir is a reservoir in the Canadian province of Saskatchewan in the Rural Municipality of Usborne No. 310. The reservoir was built along the course of Dellwood Brook as part of South Saskatchewan River Project. That project, originating at Gardiner Dam of Lake Diefenbaker, involved the building of aqueducts and a series of reservoirs to supply water for irrigation, consumption, and industry. The reservoir is about 22 kilometres (14 mi) north-east of the town of Watrous and access is from Highway 668.

== Description ==
Dellwood Reservoir is the terminal, or final, reservoir in the Saskatoon Southeast Water Supply System (SSEWSS) that originates at Lake Diefenbaker. The other reservoirs upstream in the system include Broderick Reservoir, Brightwater Reservoir, Indi Lake, Blackstrap Lake, Bradwell Reservoir, and Zelma Reservoir. Dellwood Reservoir supplies water to the Nutrien Lanigan Potash mine and the communities of Guernsey and Lanigan.

Besides the canal, the other significant inflow is Dellwood Brook. Dellwood Brook originates north of the reservoir and flows south into the north end. The canal flows into the east side of the reservoir. Dellwood Brook flows out at from a spillway at the east end of the dam and carries on in a south-easterly direction where it meets up with Lanigan Creek. Lanigan Creek flows south into Last Mountain Lake.

== Dellwood Brook Dam ==
Dellwood Brook Dam, which is at the southern end of Dellwood Reservoir, was built across Dellwood Brook in 1967. The dam is 9.4 metres (31 ft) high and the reservoir has a capacity of 5,674 dam^{3} (4,600 acre⋅ft). Dellwood Brook flows out from a spillway at the dam's eastern end. The dam and reservoir are owned and operated by the Saskatchewan Water Security Agency. In the summer of 2024, upgrades to the dam were begun that included a new radial gate.

== Fish species ==
Fish commonly found in Dellwood Reservoir include walleye, northern pike, perch, and common carp. In 2019, it was stocked with 200,000 walleye fry.

== See also ==
- List of lakes of Saskatchewan
- SaskWater
- Dams and reservoirs in Saskatchewan
