= Zelma Reservoir =

Reservoir in Saskatchewan, Canada

- Location in Saskatchewan Zelma Reservoir (Canada)
- Location: RM of Morris No. 312, Saskatchewan
- Coordinates: 51.8321°N 105.8373°W
- Type: Reservoir
- Part of: Saskatchewan River drainage basin
- Primary inflows: Aqueduct originating at Lake Diefenbaker
- Basin countries: Canada
- Managing agency: Saskatchewan Water Security Agency
- Built: 1967
- First flooded: 1967
- Max. width: 1.6 km (1 mi)
- Surface area: 376.2 ha (930 acres)
- Max. depth: 6.1 m (20 ft)
- Water volume: 14,555 dam^{3} (11,800 acre⋅ft)
- Shore length^{1}: 9.94 km (6.18 mi)
- Surface elevation: 512 m (1,680 ft)
- Settlements: None
- ^{1} Shore length is not a well-defined measure.

Zelma Reservoir is a reservoir in the Canadian province of Saskatchewan in the Rural Municipality of Morris No. 312. It is about 17 kilometres (11 mi) east-southeast of the town of Colonsay. The reservoir was built in 1967 as part of South Saskatchewan River Project. That project, originating at Gardiner Dam of Lake Diefenbaker, involved the building of aqueducts, canals, and a series of reservoirs to supply water for irrigation, consumption, and industry. Other reservoirs in the system include Broderick Reservoir, Brightwater Reservoir, Indi Lake, Blackstrap Lake, Bradwell Reservoir, and Dellwood Reservoir.

The BHP potash mine at Jansen gets its water supply from Zelma Reservoir through the Zelma East Non-Potable Water Supply.

There are no communities along the reservoir's shores. Besides Colonsay, other nearby communities include Zelma and Young. There is a public boat launch at the north-east corner, near the dam and access is from Highway 763.

== Zelma Dam ==
Zelma Dam (51.8424°N 105.8516°W), which was built in 1967, contains the reservoir. The dam is 9.1 metres (30 ft) high and the reservoir has a capacity of 14,555 dam^{3} (11,800 acre⋅ft). The dam and reservoir are owned and operated by the Saskatchewan Water Security Agency.

== Fish species ==
Fish commonly found in Zelma Reservoir include northern pike, yellow perch, and walleye. In 2019, Zelma Reservoir was stocked with 200,000 walleye fry.

== See also ==
- List of lakes of Saskatchewan
- SaskWater
- Dams and reservoirs in Saskatchewan
