= Broderick Reservoir =

Reservoir in Saskatchewan, Canada

- Location in Saskatchewan Broderick Reservoir (Canada)
- Location: RM of Rudy No. 284
- Coordinates: 51.4667°N 106.9339°W
- Type: Reservoir
- Etymology: Village of Broderick
- Part of: Saskatchewan River drainage basin
- Primary inflows: Aqueduct originating at Lake Diefenbaker
- Basin countries: Canada
- Managing agency: Saskatchewan Water Security Agency
- Built: 1967
- First flooded: 1967
- Max. width: 1.6 km (1 mi)
- Surface area: 360.5 ha (891 acres)
- Max. depth: 8.6 m (28 ft)
- Water volume: 16,035 dam^{3} (13,000 acre⋅ft)
- Shore length^{1}: 9.6 km (6.0 mi)
- Surface elevation: 563 m (1,847 ft)
- Settlements: None
- ^{1} Shore length is not a well-defined measure.

Broderick Reservoir is a reservoir about 11 kilometres (6.8 mi) south-southeast of Outlook in the Canadian province of Saskatchewan in the Rural Municipality of Rudy No. 284. Broderick Reservoir was built in 1967 as part of South Saskatchewan River Project. That project involved the building of aqueducts and a series of reservoirs to supply water for irrigation, consumption, and industry originating at Gardiner Dam at Lake Diefenbaker. Broderick is the first reservoir in the series. Downstream reservoirs include Brightwater Reservoir, Indi Lake, Blackstrap Lake, Bradwell Reservoir, Zelma Reservoir, and Dellwood Reservoir.

There are no communities along the shores of the reservoir. Broderick, the closest community, is about 1.6 kilometres (1 mi) to the north. The public has access to the reservoir for fishing and other water sports.

== Broderick West and North Dams ==
Broderick Reservoir is supplied by the 22.5-kilometre (14.0 mi) M1 Canal from Lake Diefenbaker. The reservoir, which has a capacity of 16,035 dam^{3} (13,000 acre⋅ft), is bounded by two dams. The West Dam is 8.8 metres (29 ft) high and the North Dam is 5.6 metres (18 ft) high.

== Fish species ==
Fish commonly found in Broderick Reservoir include northern pike, yellow perch, burbot, sauger, and walleye.

== See also ==
- List of lakes of Saskatchewan
- Saskatchewan Water Security Agency
- SaskWater
- Dams and reservoirs in Saskatchewan
