= Indi Lake =

Lake in Saskatchewan, Canada

- Location in Saskatchewan Indi Lake (Canada)
- Location: RMs of Rosedale No. 283 and Dundurn No. 314, Saskatchewan
- Coordinates: 51.6998°N 106.5133°W
- Type: Reservoir
- Part of: Saskatchewan River drainage basin
- Primary inflows: Earthen aqueduct from Lake Diefenbaker
- Primary outflows: Aqueduct to Blackstrap Lake
- Basin countries: Canada
- Built: 1967
- First flooded: 1967
- Max. length: 5.8 km (3.6 mi)
- Max. width: .65 km (0.4 mi)
- Surface area: 310 ha (770 acres)
- Shore length^{1}: 19 km (12 mi)
- Settlements: None
- ^{1} Shore length is not a well-defined measure.

Indi Lake is a man-made lake in central Saskatchewan, Canada, south of Saskatoon in the RMs of Rosedale No. 283 and Dundurn No. 314. The lake was created for irrigation and recreation in 1967 by a dam located at its south end. The lake is part of a greater irrigation and aqueduct system built in the 1960s in Saskatchewan and was named after Indi, an unincorporated railway point nearby on the Canadian National Railway (CNR).

The lake sits in the Blackstrap Coulee, which is 25 kilometres (16 mi) long and consists of two lakes, Blackstrap and Indi. The lakes are connected by an aqueduct system that begins at Lake Diefenbaker. Indi Lake is the shallower of the two lakes and has a more marsh-like bottom; both lake beds were farmed during dry seasons prior the dams being constructed. A short creek at the south end of the lake connects it to Brightwater Creek. Indi Lake is part of the Blackstrap Coulee (SK 078) Important Bird Area (IBA) of Canada.

The CN Railway bisects the lake and Highway 11 runs past the lake to the north.

== Aqueducts and dams on Indi and Blackstrap Lakes ==
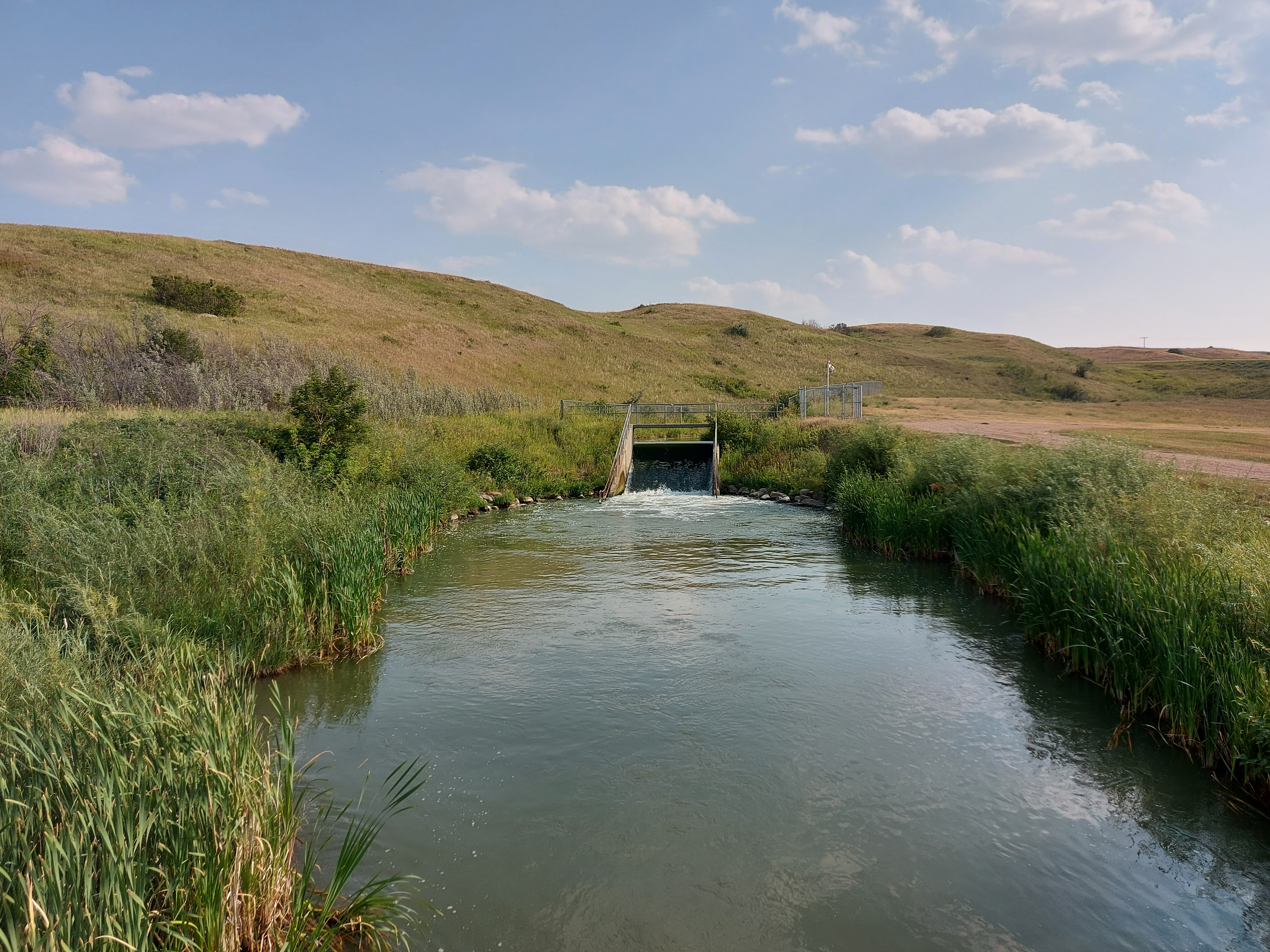
The Aqueduct that feeds Blackstrap Lake

The Blackstrap North Dam (with a height of 10.4 m (34 ft) and length of 1,370 m (4,490 ft)) is operated by Saskatchewan Water Security Agency and was constructed in 1967; the dam stores water to supply the village of Thode, the Nutrien Allan potash mine (via the Bradwell Reservoir) and the Mosaic Colonsay potash mine (via the Zelma Reservoir). The Blackstrap South Dam (with a height of 7.9 m (26 ft) and length of 1,116 m (3,661 ft)) is also operated by Saskatchewan Water Security Agency and was also constructed in 1967.

The dams at Indi and Blackstrap lake and the channel that brings water from Indi to Blackstrap Lake are part of a much larger system that brings water from the South Saskatchewan River through a series of aqueducts to the area. The aqueduct system starts at the Gardiner Dam at Lake Diefenbaker and supplies water downstream to other reservoirs as well, including Brightwater, Broderick, and Bradwell Reservoirs.

== See also ==
- List of lakes of Saskatchewan
- List of dams and reservoirs in Canada
- SaskWater
