= Dundurn =

Dundurn may refer to:

- Dundurn, Saskatchewan, Canada
  - CFD Dundurn, a Canadian Forces facility near Dundurn, Saskatchewan
- Rural Municipality of Dundurn No. 314, Saskatchewan, Canada
- Dundurn, Scotland, an ancient Pictish fort, in Strathearn, Scotland
- Dundurn Castle, Hamilton, Ontario, Canada
- Dundurn Press, a Canadian publishing company
