= Lanigan Creek =

River in Saskatchewan, Canada

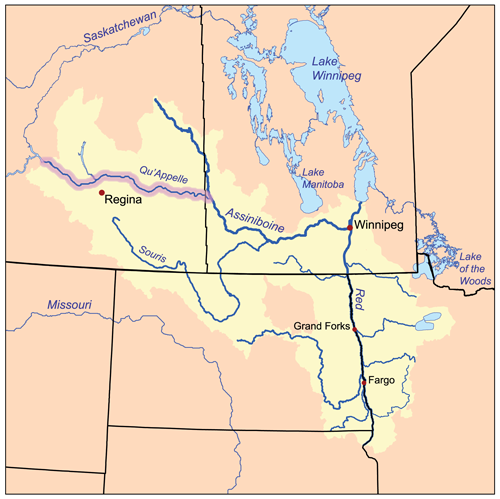
- The Red River drainage basin, with the Qu'Appelle River highlighted

- Location of mouth in Saskatchewan Lanigan Creek (Canada)

Location
- Country: Canada
- Province: Saskatchewan

Physical characteristics
- Source: Near St. Gregor
- Mouth: Last Mountain Lake
  - location: At Last Mountain Lake NWA
  - coordinates: 51°24′9″N 105°12′48″W

Basin features
- River system: Red River drainage basin

Lanigan Creek is a river in the Canadian province of Saskatchewan. It is located in the south central part of the province in a region called the Prairie Pothole Region of North America, which extends throughout three Canadian provinces and five U.S. states. It is also within Palliser's Triangle and the Great Plains ecoregion.

The river starts north-west of the Quill Lakes, near the village of St. Gregor and the intersections of Highway 5 and Highway 667. It travels in a south-south-westwardly direction past the town of Lanigan and into the northern end of Last Mountain Lake. The river is part of the Upper Qu'Appelle River watershed, as Last Mountain Creek drains Last Mountain Lake into the Qu'Appelle River. The most northerly part of the Lanigan Creek Watershed also happens to be the most northerly point of the Red River Watershed.

At the southern end of Lanigan Creek, at the point it empties into Last Mountain Lake, there's Last Mountain Lake Bird Sanctuary, which was North America's first migratory bird sanctuary. The northern end of lake is a large, marshy flood plain. Last Mountain Lake National Wildlife Area encompasses all of the bird sanctuary, the northern portion of the lake, and the flood plain plus surrounding grasslands and hills. The area is listed as a Ramsar site.

== Lanigan-Manitou Sub-basin ==
Lanigan-Manitou Sub-basin is the name given to Lanigan Creek's drainage basin. Along with the Moose Jaw River Watershed, it is one of four sub-basins that make up the Upper Qu'Appelle Watershed; the other three being the Last Mountain Lake Sub-basin, Upper Qu'Appelle Sub-basin, and Wascana Lake Sub-basin. Craven Dam at the village of Craven is the dividing point between the upper and lower watersheds of the Qu'Appelle River. The combined area of all four sub-basins and the Moose Jaw River Watershed is 23,443 km^{2}. There are several lakes within the sub-basin, with the largest being a salt water endorheic basin lake called Little Manitou. Along the course of Lanigan Creek is Boulder Lake, which is located just east of Venn about 20 kilometres (12 mi) south-east of Watrous. Mitt Lake is a small lake that parallels Boulder Lake just to the east. About 5 km farther downstream is Axe Lake, which is on the north side of Highway 15, about 3.5 km north of the Last Mountain Lake National Wildlife Area.

Other prominent lakes in the sub-basin include Buffalo Lake, Zelma Reservoir, Strap Lake, Dellwood Reservoir, Bank Lake, and Peter Lake.

== Tributaries ==
There are several tributaries that flow into Lanigan Creek, many of which are small, unnamed arroyo creeks. Starting in the upper watershed the following is a list of named tributaries:

- Dellwood Brook
- Undora Brook
- Saline Creek

== See also ==
- List of rivers of Saskatchewan
- Hudson Bay drainage basin
