= Thode, Saskatchewan =

Village in Saskatchewan, Canada

Thode
- Resort village
- Resort Village of Thode
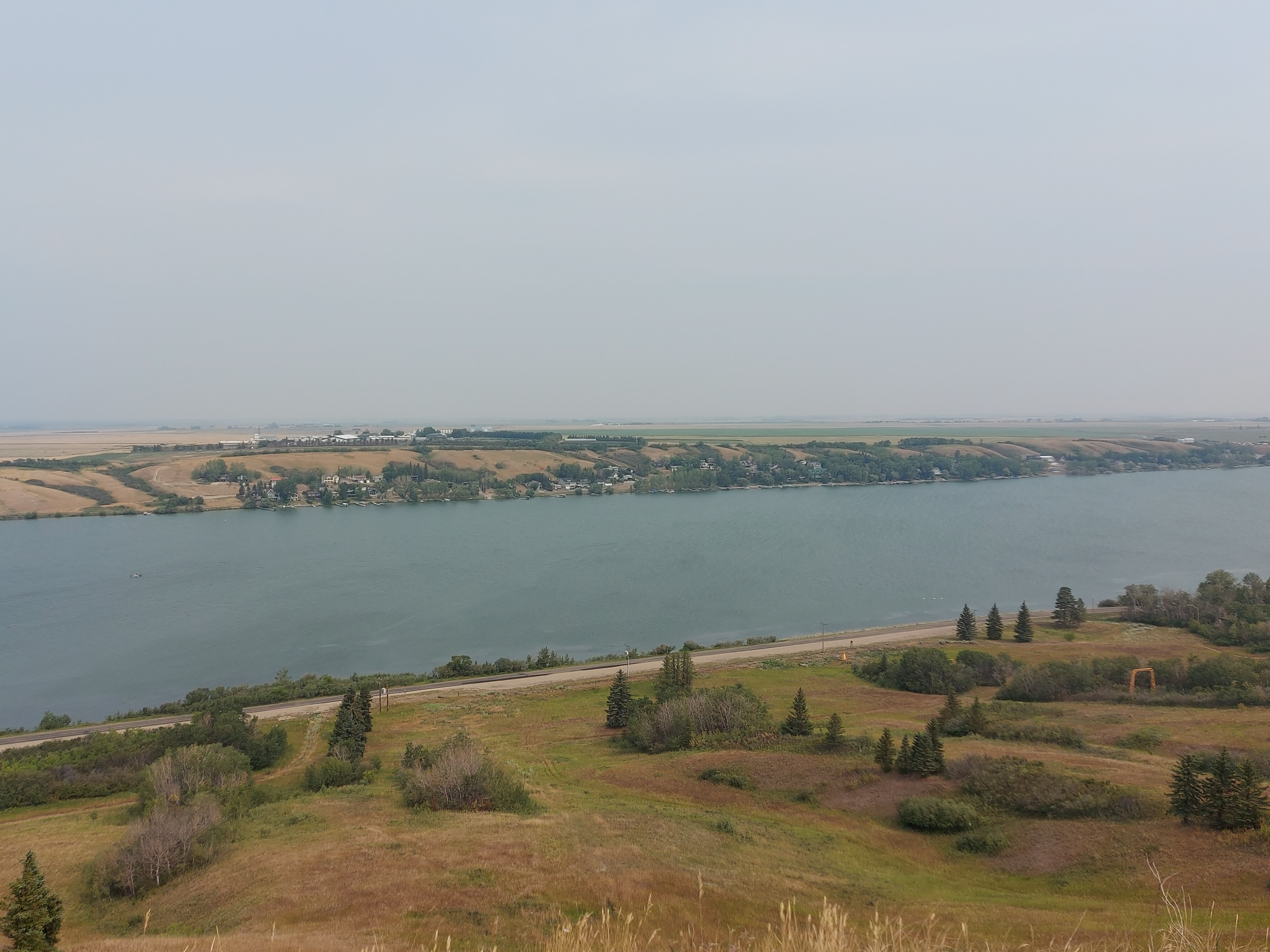
- Thode viewed from the top of Mount Blackstrap

- Location within Saskatchewan Location within Canada
- Coordinates: 51.789°N 106.443°W
- Country: Canada
- Province: Saskatchewan
- Census division: 11
- Rural municipality: RM of Dundurn No. 314
- Incorporated: January 1, 1981

Government
  - Mayor: Corey Fernets
  - Governing body: Resort Village Council
  - Administrator: Krystal Staniowski
  - MP: Fraser Tolmie
  - MLA: Barret Kropf

Area (2016)
  - Land: 0.73 km^{2} (0.28 sq mi)

Population (2016)
  - Total: 157
  - Density: 215.1/km^{2} (557/sq mi)
- Time zone: CST
  - Summer (DST): CST
- Postal code: S7C
- Area codes: 306 and 639
- Waterway(s): Blackstrap Lake
- Website: Official website

Thode (2016 population: 157) is a resort village in the Canadian province of Saskatchewan within Census Division No. 11. It is on the shores of Blackstrap Lake in the Rural Municipality of Dundurn No. 314. It is east of the town of Dundurn.

== History ==
Thode incorporated as a resort village on January 1, 1981.

== Demographics ==
Population history (1981–2016)
Year	Pop.	±%
1981	27	—
1986	42	+55.6%
1991	68	+61.9%
1996	90	+32.4%
2001	133	+47.8%
2006	156	+17.3%
2011	157	+0.6%
2016	157	+0.0%
Source: Statistics Canada via Saskatchewan Bureau of Statistics

In the 2021 Census of Population conducted by Statistics Canada, Thode had a population of 163 living in 76 of its 107 total private dwellings, a change of 3.8% from its 2016 population of 157. With a land area of 0.72 km^{2} (0.28 sq mi), it had a population density of 226.4/km^{2} (586.3/sq mi) in 2021.

In the 2016 Census of Population conducted by Statistics Canada, the Resort Village of Thode recorded a population of 157 living in 63 of its 107 total private dwellings, a 0% change from its 2011 population of 157. With a land area of 0.73 km^{2} (0.28 sq mi), it had a population density of 215.1/km^{2} (557.0/sq mi) in 2016.

== Sports and recreation ==
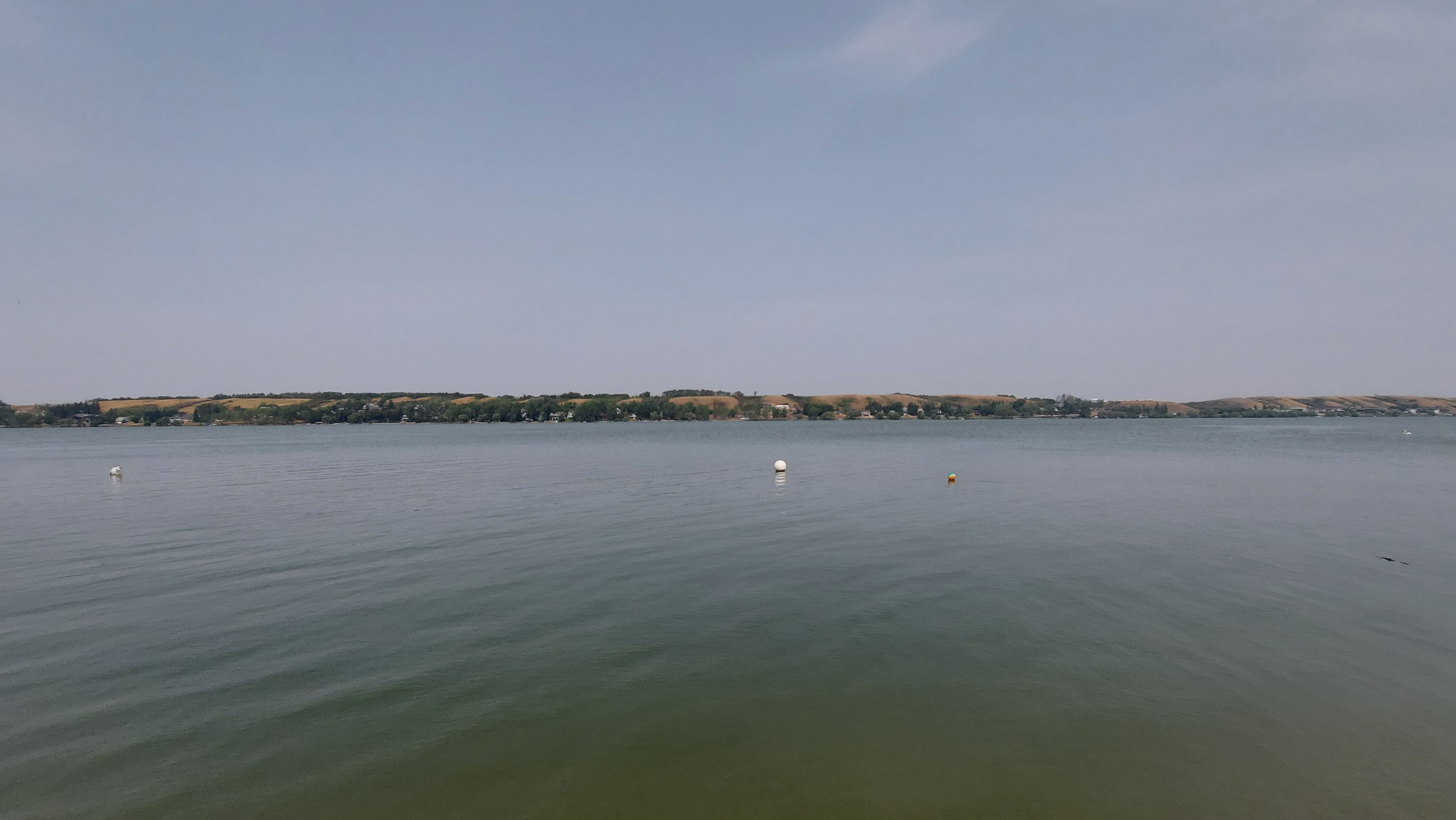
Thode viewed from Blackstrap Provincial Park

Thode is located on the western shore of Blackstrap Lake and has access to all the amenities of the lake, such as boating, fishing, swimming. Directly across the lake from Thode is Blackstrap Provincial Park, which features Mount Blackstrap, camping, hiking, picnicking, and various water activities. Also the lake across from Thode on the north-eastern shore is Lakeside Golf Resort, which opened June 1, 2021. Lakeside Golf Resort is directly across from Shields.

== Government ==
The Resort Village of Thode is governed by an elected municipal council and an appointed administrator that meets on the third Thursday of every month. The mayor is Corey Fernets and its administrator is Krystal Staniowski.

== See also ==
- List of communities in Saskatchewan
- List of francophone communities in Saskatchewan
- List of municipalities in Saskatchewan
- List of resort villages in Saskatchewan
- List of villages in Saskatchewan
- List of summer villages in Alberta
