= Blackstrap Lake =

Reservoir in Saskatchewan, Canada

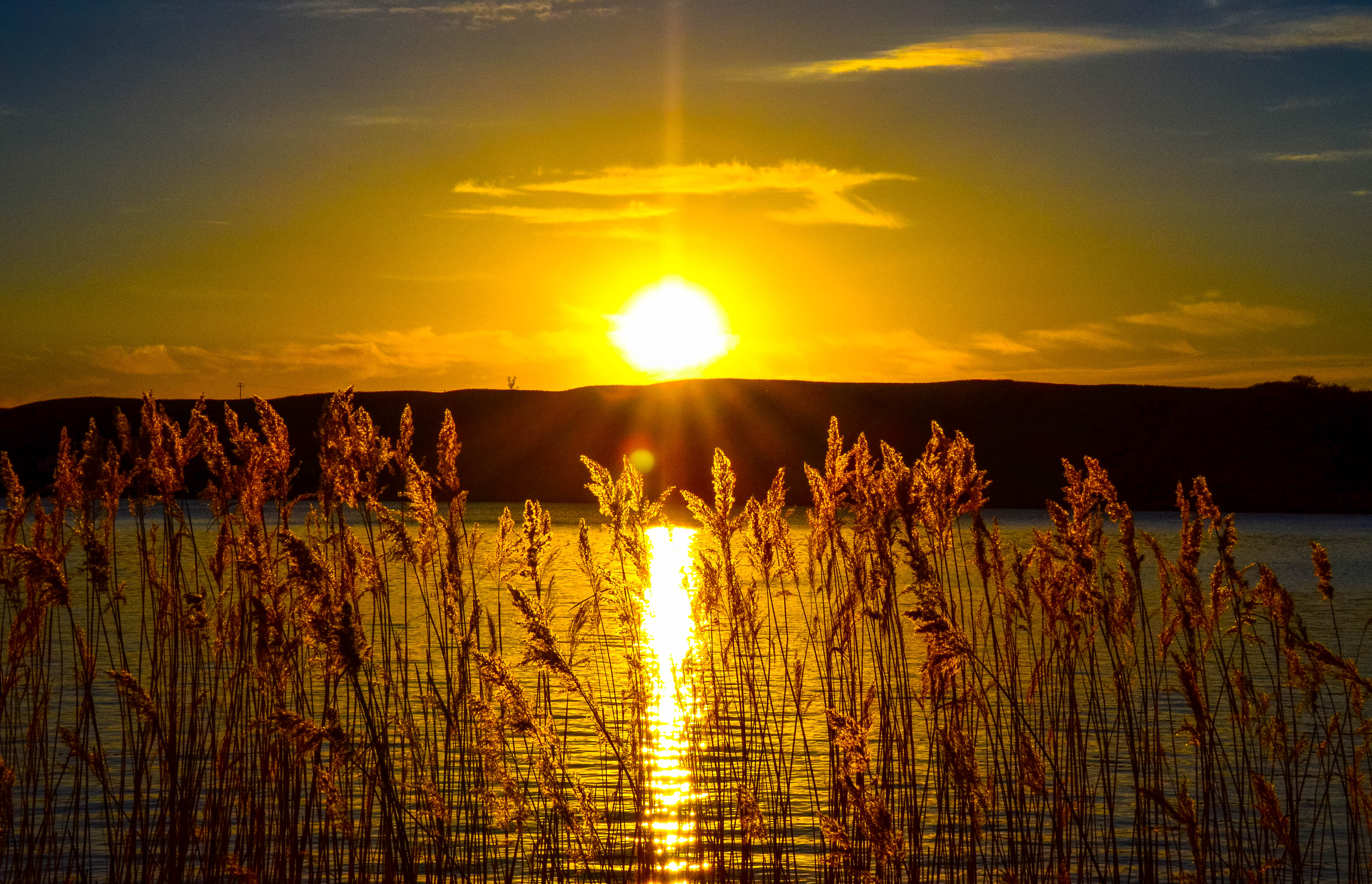
- Sunset at Blackstrap Lake

- Location in Saskatchewan Blackstrap Lake (Canada)
- Location: Saskatchewan
- Coordinates: 51°47′20″N 106°25′11″W
- Type: Reservoir
- Part of: Saskatchewan River drainage basin
- Primary inflows: Earthen aqueduct from Lake Diefenbaker
- Basin countries: Canada
- Managing agency: Saskatchewan Water Security Agency
- Max. length: 14.4 km (8.9 mi)
- Max. width: 0.8–1.2 km (0.50–0.75 mi)
- Surface area: 1,200 ha (3,000 acres)
- Average depth: 5.15 m (16.9 ft)
- Max. depth: 9.39 m (30.8 ft)
- Water volume: 61.5×10^{6} m^{3} (49,900 acre⋅ft)
- Shore length^{1}: 39.5 km (24.5 mi)
- Surface elevation: 534.5 m (1,754 ft)
- Settlements: Shields; Thode
- ^{1} Shore length is not a well-defined measure.

Blackstrap Lake is a man-made reservoir in central Saskatchewan, Canada, south of Saskatoon in the Rural Municipality of Dundurn No. 314. The lake was created as a reservoir in 1967, as part of the Saskatoon South East Water Supply System. Blackstrap Lake has an area of 1,200 ha (3,000 acres) (14.4 km x 0.8-1.2 km at a depth of 5.14 m) and is generally used to support irrigation, and the industrial and municipal water supply.

The Blackstrap Coulee, or Valley, is an ancient spillway created by the melting of the Wisconsin glacier. Two formerly small and marshy lakes, Theresa Lake and Blackstrap Lake, were in the area now covered by the reservoir. First Nations peoples used the valley for hunting and shelter. European settlers farmed the flat land of the valley during dry seasons. Some of this flat land forms the present lake bed and is an Important Bird Area (IBA) of Canada. The Blackstrap Coulee (SK 078) IBA covers an area of 77.18 km (47.96 mi) and includes Blackstrap Lake and neighbouring Indi Lake. Two hundred and thirty-nine different species of birds have been recorded at Blackstrap Coulee. Some of them include the western grebe, Franklin's gull, black tern, tundra swan, bufflehead, stilt sandpiper, red-necked phalarope, and the Forster's tern.

Blackstrap Lake is a major part of Blackstrap Provincial Park. A recreation area was established soon after the completion of the lake, and further developed with a ski hill for the 1971 Canada Winter Games. The provincial park was established in 1986.

== Blackstrap North and South Dams ==
The drought during the Dirty Thirties prompted the construction of two dams, the Gardiner Dam and Qu'Appelle River Dam, along the South Saskatchewan River, creating Lake Diefenbaker. The Gardiner Dam was built along the course of the river while the Qu'Appelle River Dam was built to allow for water from Lake Diefenbaker to flow into the Qu'Appelle River. A series of gravity-fed aqueducts and reservoirs originating from Lake Diefenbaker were also built to supply water to the areas south-east of Saskatoon, with Blackstrap Lake being the largest reservoir. Blackstrap North and Blackstrap South Dams were constructed in 1967, and are operated by the Saskatchewan Water Security Agency. Blackstrap North Dam has a height of 10.4 m (34 ft) and length of 1,370 m (4,490 ft) while Blackstrap South Dam has a height of 7.9 m (26 ft) and length of 1,116 m (3,661 ft). The dams store water to supply the villages of Thode and Shields, the PCS Allan potash mine (via the Bradwell Reservoir) and the Mosaic Colonsay potash mine (via Zelma Reservoir).

The aqueduct, or canal, that feeds Blackstrap Lake originates at Lake Diefenbaker and passes through two other man-made reservoirs en route. The aqueduct starts at Gardiner Dam and heads south paralleling the South Saskatchewan River. East of the town of Outlook, and just south of the village of Broderick, the aqueduct flows into Broderick Reservoir. From there, the canal meanders in a north-easterly direction until it meets Brightwater Reservoir. From Brightwater Reservoir, the canal heads straight north towards Indi Lake. passing to the east of it and then under Highway 11 and into Blackstrap Lake. A canal exits the north end of Blackstrap Lake at the North Dam and supplies water to other reservoirs, such as Bradwell Reservoir and Zelma Reservoir.

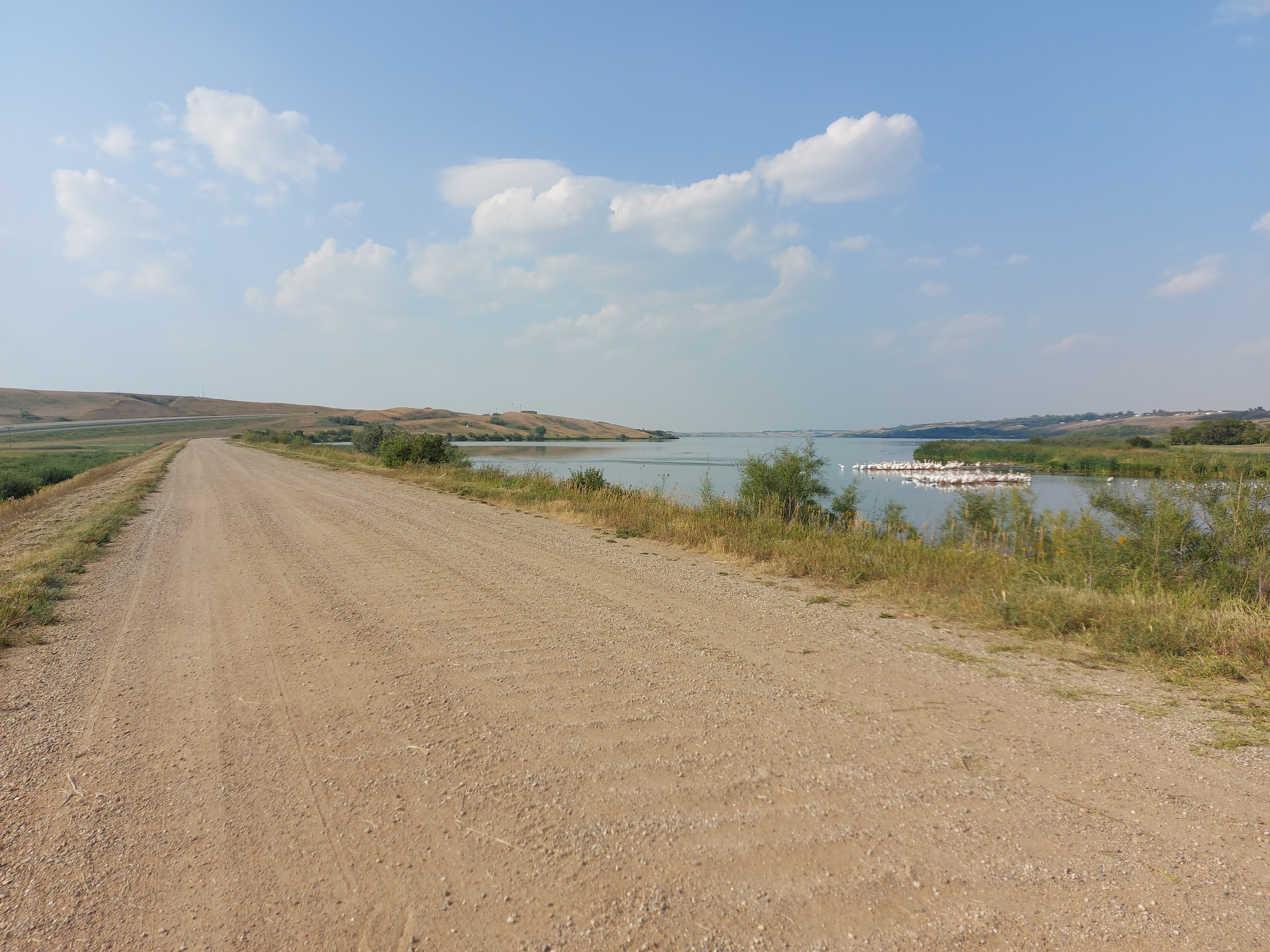
Blackstrap South Dam

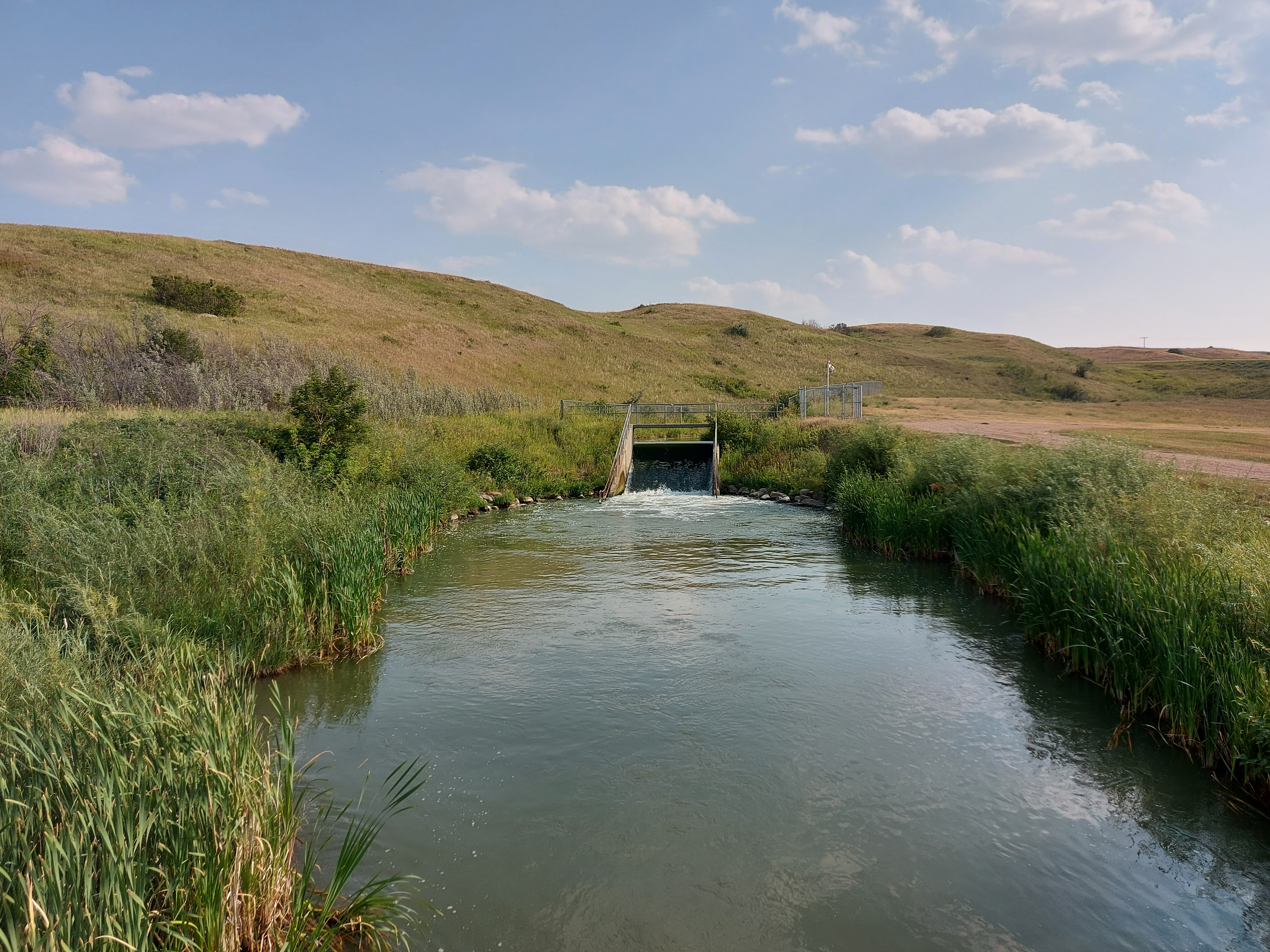
The Aqueduct that feeds Blackstrap Lake

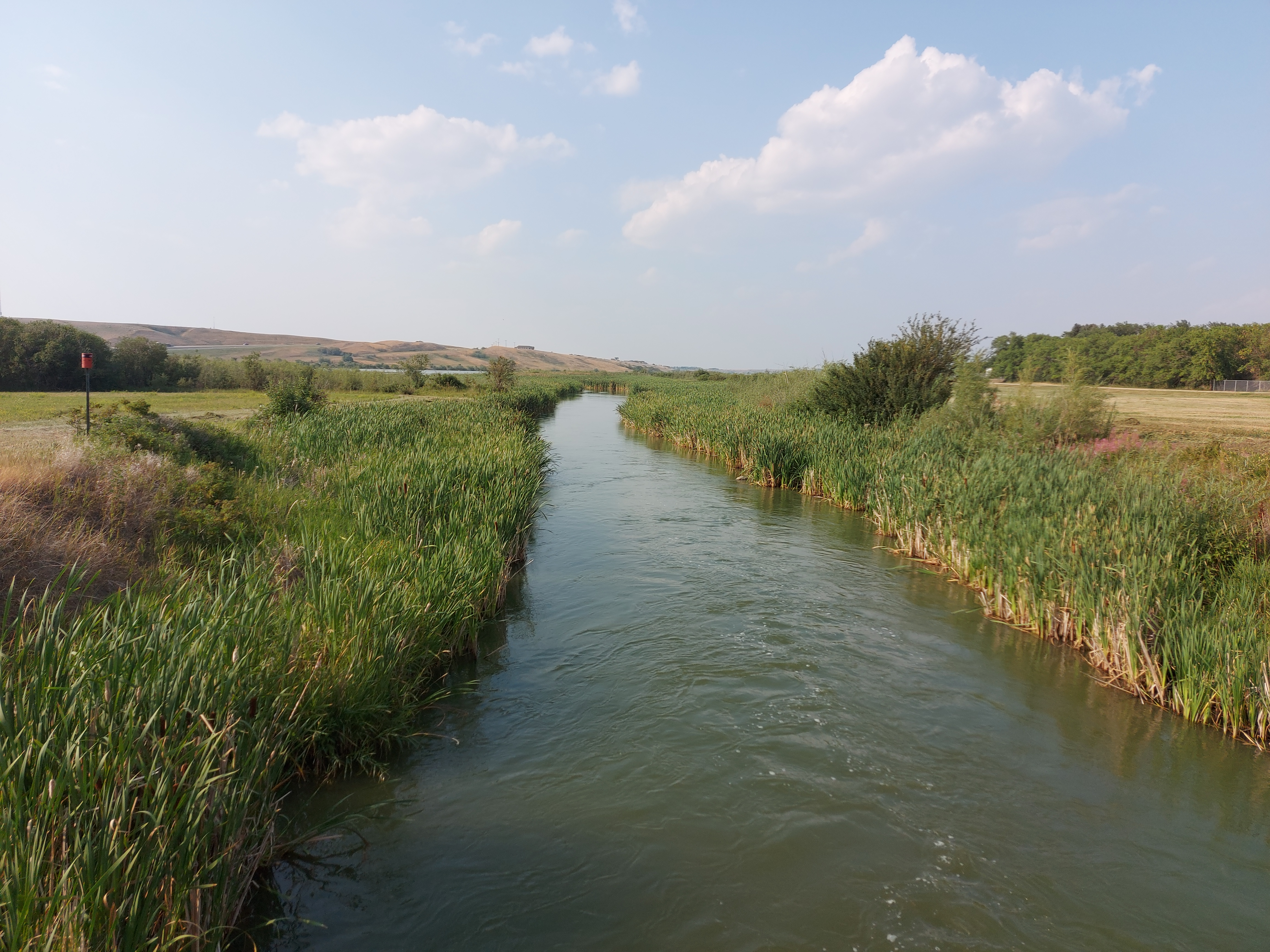
Blackstrap Lake inflow from the aqueduct, near South Dam

== Local communities ==
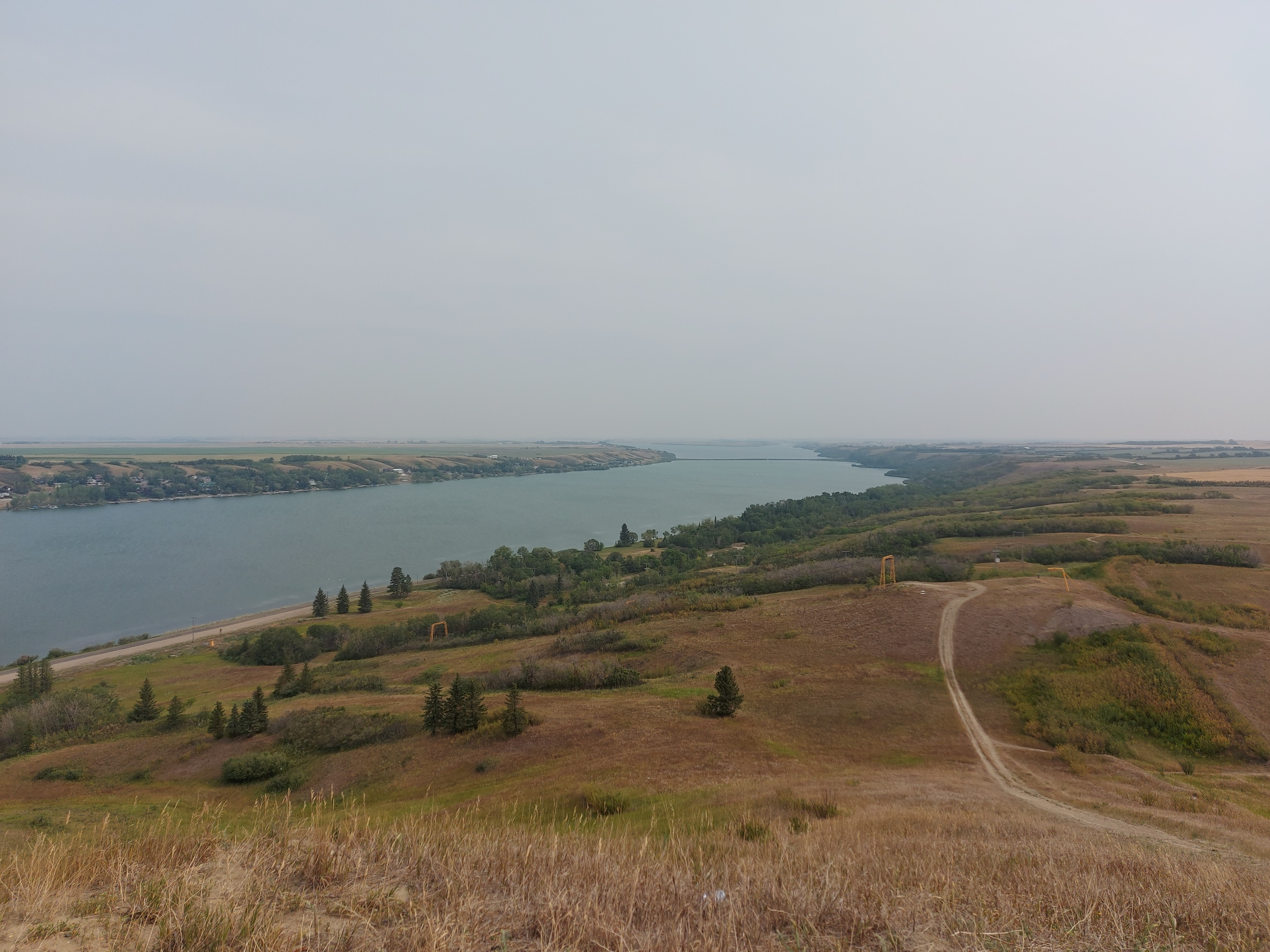
View of Blackstrap Lake from the top of Mount Blackstrap, looking north. Thode is visible on the west side of the lake.

Local communities on the shore of Lake Blackstrap include two villages, two subdivisions, and a Hutterite Colony. The resort village of Thode is on the western shore, near the middle, directly across from the main beach at Blackstrap Provincial Park It is home to approximately 156 people. Most of the people in Thode live either directly on the lakeshore, or have an unobstructed view over Lakeshore Road which separates them from the lake. The resort village of Shields is on the north-western shore and is home to approximately 172 people. It has a golf course, which includes a view of Blackstrap Lake, that is maintained locally by the community of Shields. Unlike Thode, only a portion of Shields is lakefront property. In addition to the full-time residents, Shields and Thode have summer cottagers which are not reflected in the population statistics. Skyview Estates are located south of Thode along the western shore of the lake near the south end and is accessed from Highway 11. Skyview Estates have a view of the mountain, Mount Blackstrap, and the lake, and are directly across from the Blackstrap Provincial Park campgrounds. Skyview Estates also have their own marina allowing the residents unlimited access to the water. However, the estates themselves do not actually connect to the shore. The other subdivision is located on the north-eastern shore along an arm of the lake and is part of the Lakeside Golf Resort. Hillcrest Hutterite Colony is located along Thode Road, just west of Thode. It was established in 1969 and is a division of the Leask Hutterite Colony.

== Fish species ==
Fish species include walleye, yellow perch, northern pike, whitefish, and burbot. There are custom fishing limits for all of these species on the lake.

== Gallery ==
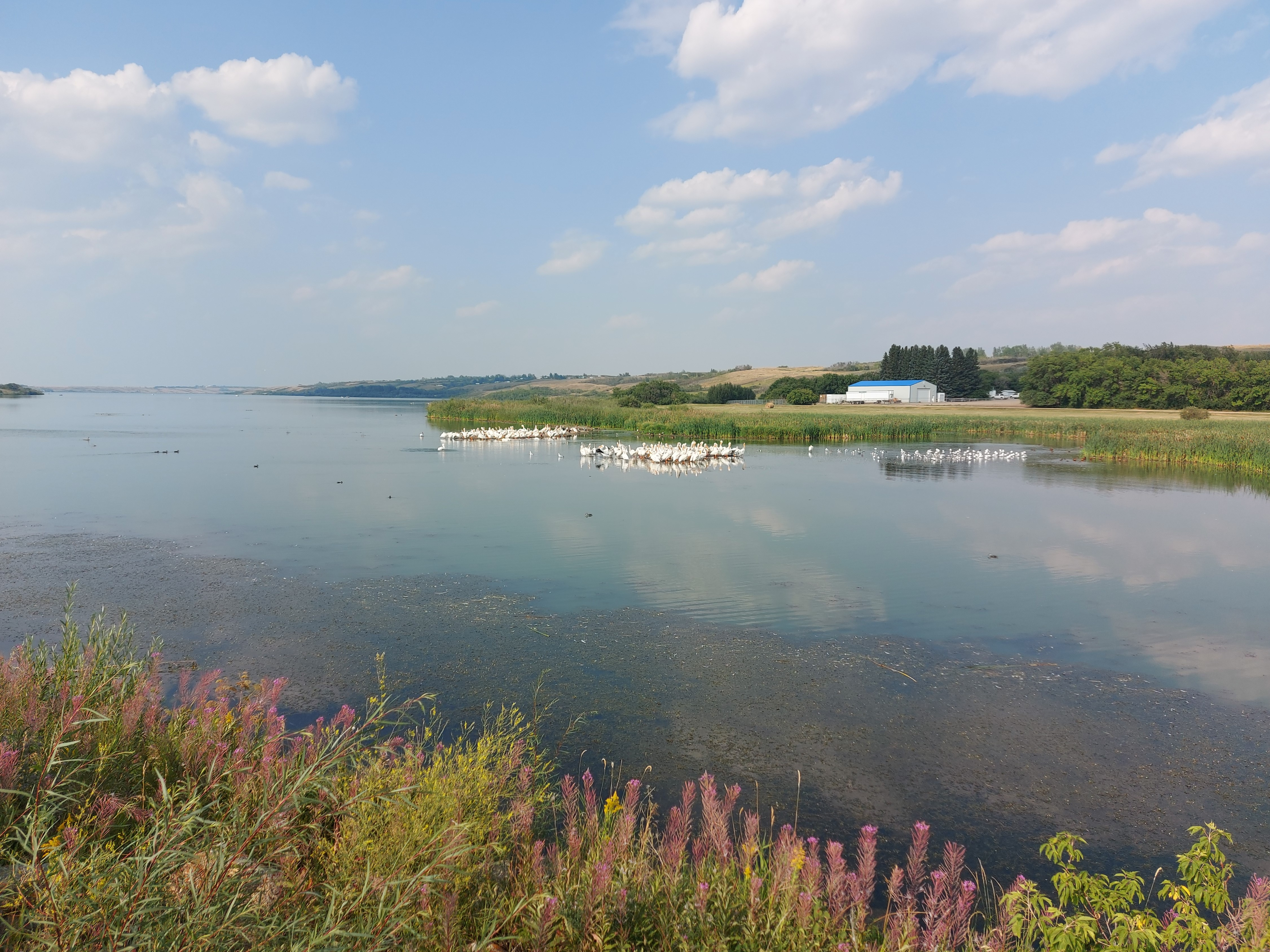
Pelicans at the southern end of Blackstrap Lake, across from the Blackstrap South Dam

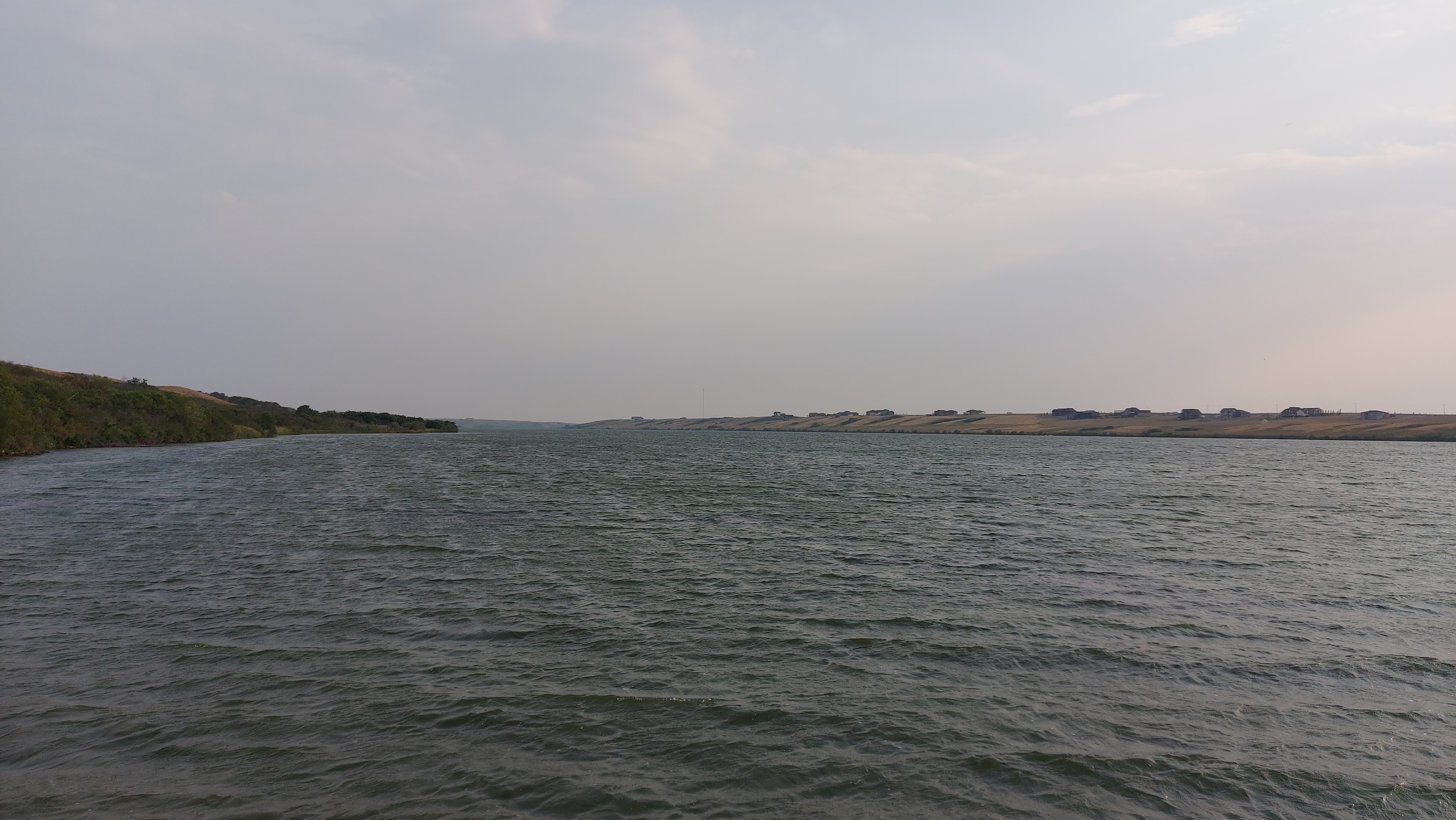
Blackstrap Lake

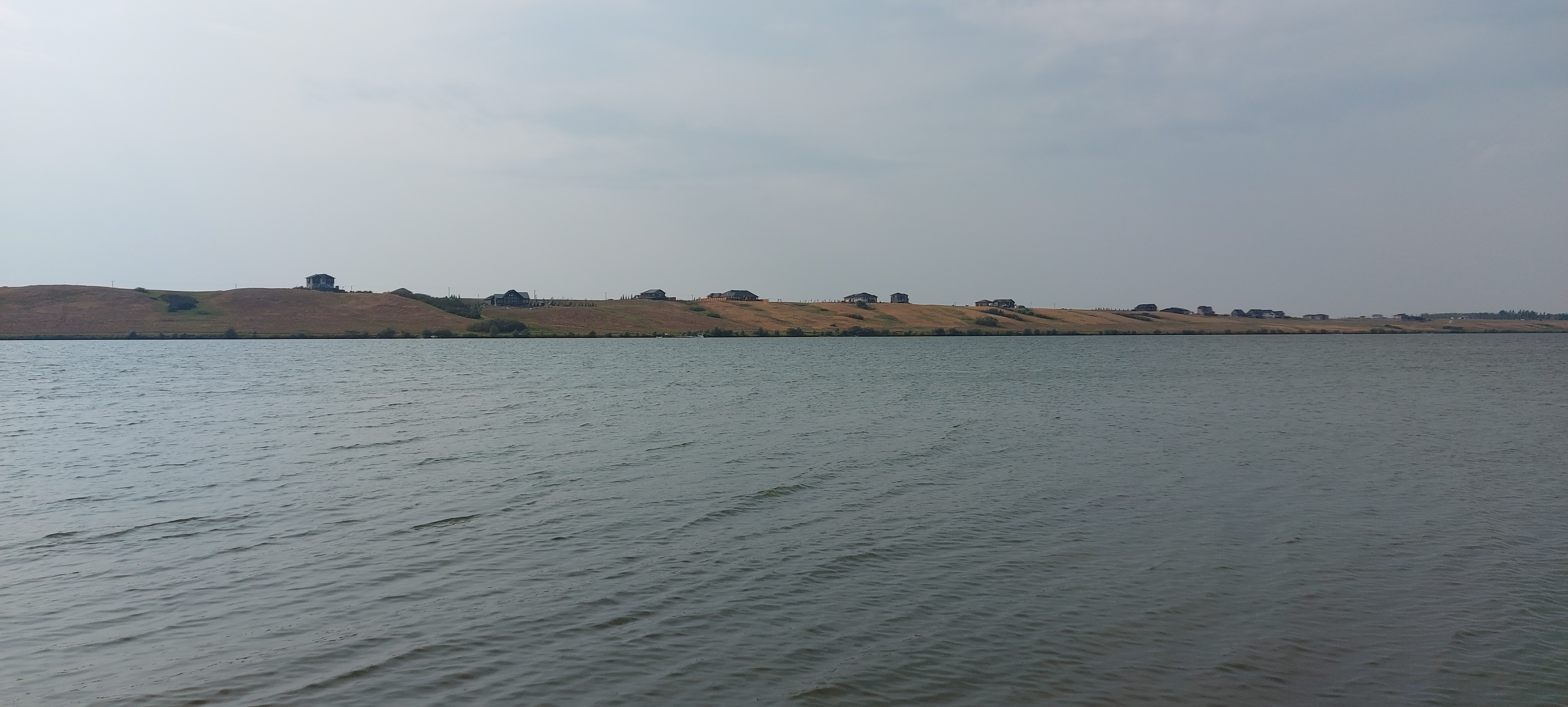
Blackstrap Lake

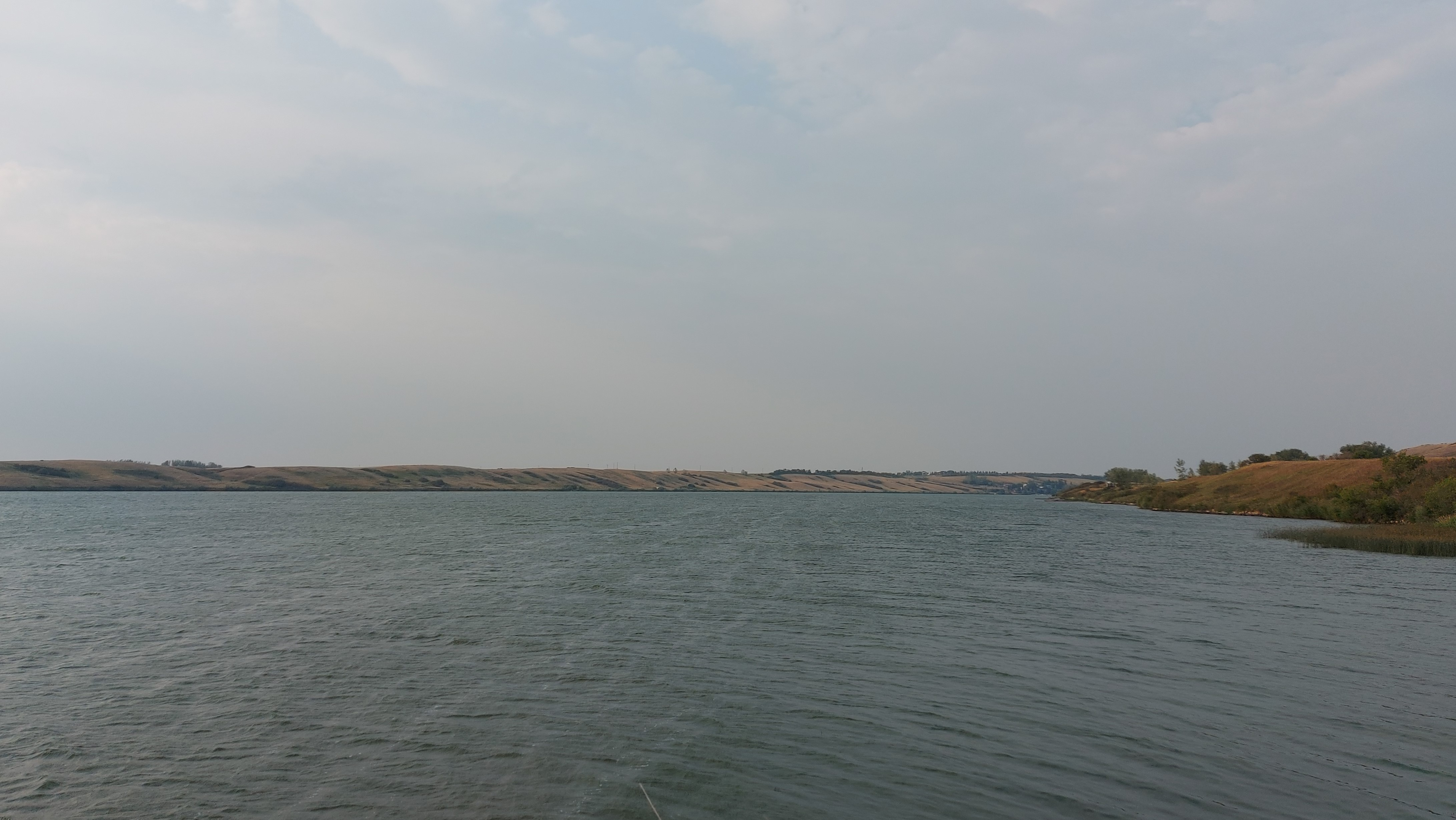
Blackstrap Lake

== See also ==
- List of lakes of Saskatchewan
- Saskatchewan Water Security Agency
- SaskWater
- Dams and reservoirs in Saskatchewan
