= Rural Municipality of Dundurn No. 314 =

Rural municipality in Saskatchewan, Canada

Dundurn No. 314
- Rural municipality
- Rural Municipality of Dundurn No. 314
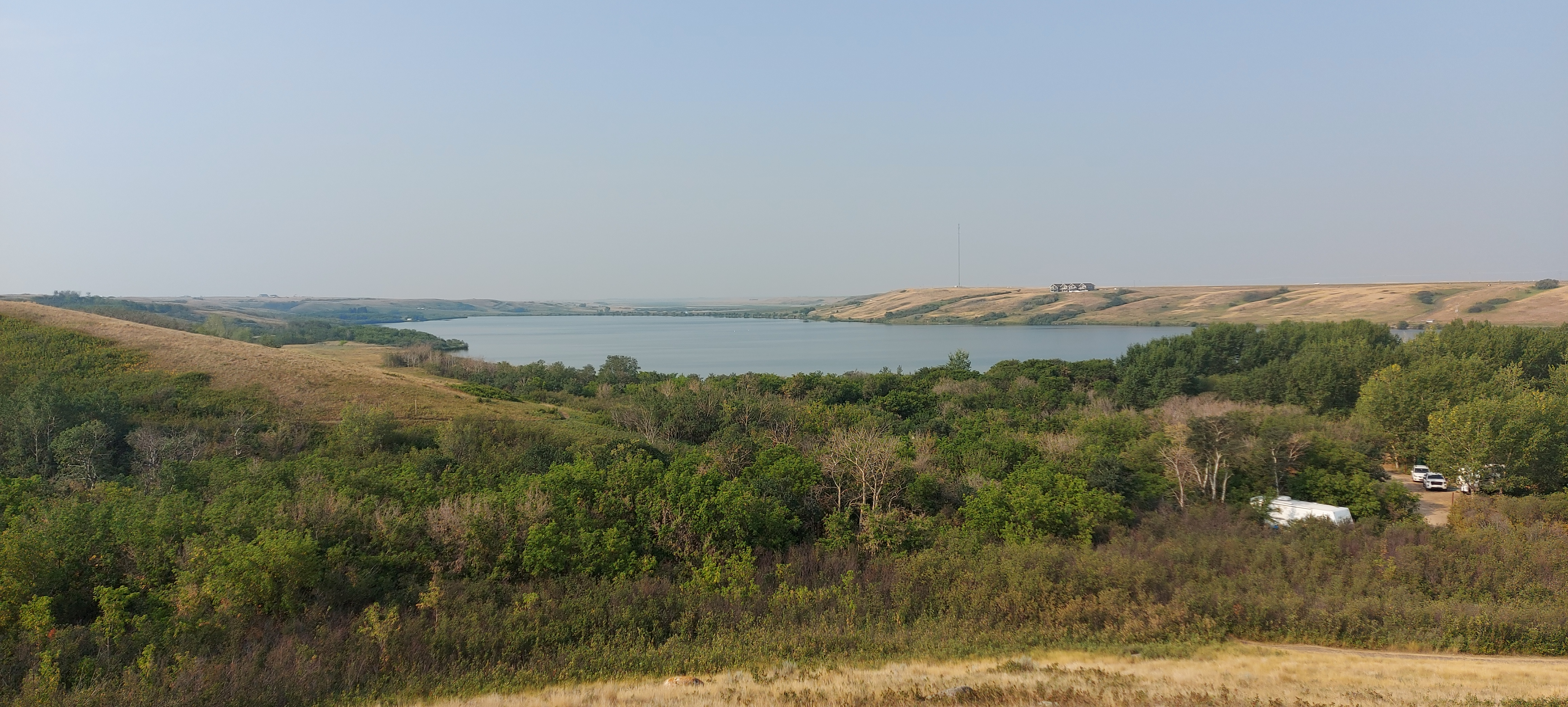
- Blackstrap Lake in the RM of Dundurn

- Location of the RM of Dundurn No. 314 in Saskatchewan
- Coordinates: 51.855°N 106.636°W
- Country: Canada
- Province: Saskatchewan
- Census division: 11
- SARM division: 5
- Formed: December 13, 1909

Government
  - Reeve: Travis Libke
  - Governing body: RM of Dundurn No. 314 Council
  - Chief Administrative Officer: G. Craig Baird
  - Office location: Dundurn

Area (2016)
  - Land: 807.94 km^{2} (311.95 sq mi)

Population (2016)
  - Total: 2,404
  - Density: 3/km^{2} (7.8/sq mi)
- Time zone: CST
  - Summer (DST): CST
- Area codes: 306 and 639
- Website: Official website

The Rural Municipality of Dundurn No. 314 (2016 population: 2,404) is a rural municipality (RM) in the Canadian province of Saskatchewan within Census Division No. 11 and SARM Division No. 5. It is located in the north-central portion of the province along the South Saskatchewan River and surrounds the Town of Dundurn.

== History ==
The RM of Dundurn No. 314 incorporated as a rural municipality on December 13, 1909.

== Geography ==
Notable geographical features in the RM include Brightwater Lake, Blackstrap Lake, Indi Lake, Mount Blackstrap, Brightwater Creek, and Allan Hills.

=== Communities and localities ===
The following urban municipalities are surrounded by the RM.

Towns

- Dundurn

Resort villages

- Shields
- Thode

The following unincorporated communities are within the RM.

Organized hamlets

- Beaver Creek

The RM is also home to the Hillcrest Hutterite Colony and the Canadian Forces Ammunition Depot Dundurn Canadian Forces Base.

== Demographics ==
Population history (1981–2016)
Year	Pop.	±%
1981	568	—
1986	537	−5.5%
1991	569	+6.0%
1996	555	−2.5%
2001	562	+1.3%
2006	632	+12.5%
2011	1,148	+81.6%
2016	2,404	+109.4%
Source: Statistics Canada via Saskatchewan Bureau of Statistics

In the 2021 Census of Population conducted by Statistics Canada, the RM of Dundurn No. 314 had a population of 2,101 living in 626 of its 657 total private dwellings, a change of −12.6% from its 2016 population of 2,404. With a land area of 799.97 km^{2} (308.87 sq mi), it had a population density of 2.6/km^{2} (6.8/sq mi) in 2021.

In the 2016 Census of Population, the RM of Dundurn No. 314 recorded a population of 2,404 living in 484 of its 503 total private dwellings, a 109.4% change from its 2011 population of 1,148. With a land area of 807.94 km^{2} (311.95 sq mi), it had a population density of 3.0/km^{2} (7.7/sq mi) in 2016.

== Attractions ==
- Indi Lake
- Blackstrap Lake
- Blackstrap Provincial Park

== Government ==
The RM of Dundurn No. 314 is governed by an elected municipal council and an appointed administrator that meets on the third Tuesday of every month. The reeve of the RM is Vacant while its Chief Administrative Officer is G. Craig Baird. The RM's office is located in the Town of Dundurn.

Moose Jaw-Lake Centre-Lanigan is the federal electoral district for the RM, which is represented by an elected member of parliament. The member of the legislative assembly represents the Arm River-Watrous provincial constituency.
