= Shields, Saskatchewan =

Shields
- Resort village
- Resort Village of Shields
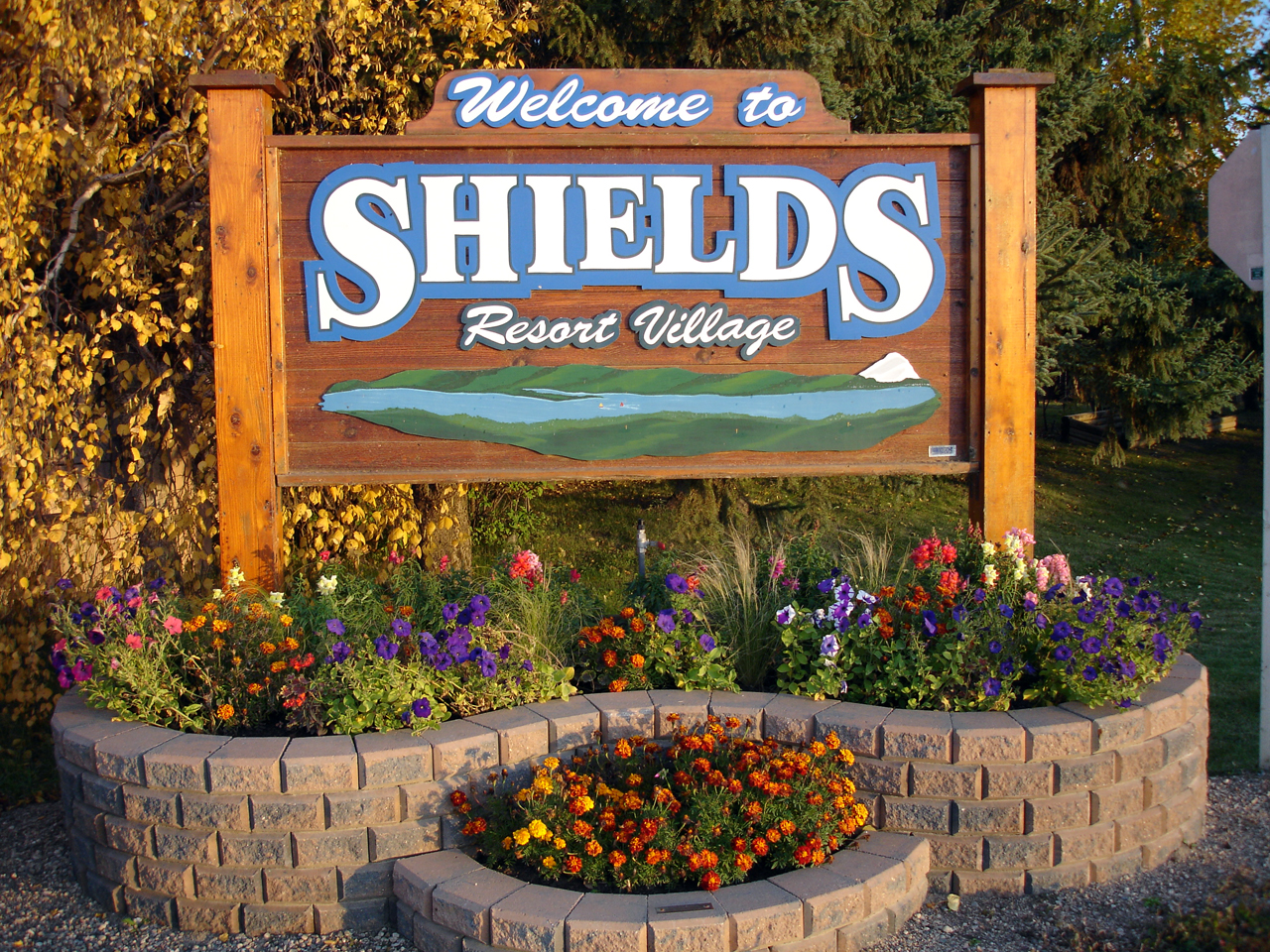
- Shields welcome sign

- Location within Saskatchewan
- Coordinates: 51.82°N 106.405°W
- Country: Canada
- Province: Saskatchewan
- Census division: 11
- Rural municipality: RM of Dundurn No. 314
- Incorporated: January 1, 1981

Government
  - Mayor: Angela Larson
  - Governing body: Resort Village Council
  - Administrator: Jessica Arguin

Area (2016)
  - Land: 0.72 km^{2} (0.28 sq mi)

Population (2016)
  - Total: 288
  - Density: 400/km^{2} (1,000/sq mi)
- Time zone: CST
  - Summer (DST): CST
- Postal code: S7C
- Area codes: 306 and 639
- Waterway(s): Lake Blackstrap
- Website: Official website

Shields (2021 population: 351) is a resort village in the Canadian province of Saskatchewan within Census Division No. 11. It is on the shores of Blackstrap Lake in the Rural Municipality of Dundurn No. 314. It east of the town of Dundurn.

== History ==
Shields incorporated as a resort village on January 1, 1981.

== Sports and recreation ==
Shields is located on the north-western shore of Blackstrap Lake. There's boating, fishing, swimming, and other water sports. Shields also has a 9-hold golf course and is a short drive from Blackstrap Provincial Park, which is on the eastern side of the lake and features Mount Blackstrap, camping, picnicking, boating, and swimming. On the north-eastern shore of the lake is another golf course, Lakeside Golf Resort, which opened June 1, 2021. Lakeside Golf Resort is directly across from Shields.

== Demographics ==
Population history (1981–2016)
Year	Pop.	±%
1981	21	—
1986	36	+71.4%
1991	35	−2.8%
1996	78	+122.9%
2001	142	+82.1%
2006	172	+21.1%
2011	220	+27.9%
2016	288	+30.9%
Source: Statistics Canada via Saskatchewan Bureau of Statistics

In the 2021 Census of Population conducted by Statistics Canada, Shields had a population of 351 living in 150 of its 204 total private dwellings, a change of 21.9% from its 2016 population of 288. With a land area of 0.75 km^{2} (0.29 sq mi), it had a population density of 468.0/km^{2} (1,212.1/sq mi) in 2021.

In the 2016 Census of Population conducted by Statistics Canada, the Resort Village of Shields recorded a population of 288 living in 117 of its 195 total private dwellings, a 30.9% change from its 2011 population of 220. With a land area of 0.72 km^{2} (0.28 sq mi), it had a population density of 400.0/km^{2} (1,036.0/sq mi) in 2016.

== Government ==
The Resort Village of Shields is governed by an elected municipal council and an appointed administrator that meets on the third Wednesday of every month. The mayor is Angela Larson and its administrator is Jessica Arguin.

== See also ==
- List of communities in Saskatchewan
- List of francophone communities in Saskatchewan
- List of municipalities in Saskatchewan
- List of resort villages in Saskatchewan
- List of villages in Saskatchewan
- List of summer villages in Alberta
