= Saskatchewan Water Security Agency =

The Saskatchewan Water Security Agency (before 2013, the Saskatchewan Watershed Authority) is an arm's length organization responsible for the management of water resources to ensure safe drinking water sources and reliable water supplies for economic, environmental, and social benefits in Saskatchewan, Canada. The Agency is a Treasury Board Crown Corporation administered by a board of directors appointed by the provincial government. Water Security Agency is located in Moose Jaw, SK, Canada and is part of the Water, Sewage and Other Systems Industry. Water Security Agency has 320.5 full time equivalent employees across all of its locations.

The Agency

- operates dams and related facilities,
- maintains an inventory of the quantity and quality of ground and surface water,
- administers the allocation of water,
- regulates and controls the flow of rivers, lakes, reservoirs, and other bodies of water,
- represents the provincial government when negotiating interprovincial and international water agreements,
- regulates water works and drainage works,
- develops flood forecasting and identify flood susceptible areas,
- promotes the efficient use of water for environmental and socio-economic benefits,
- develops watershed studies and research,
- protects watersheds, including ecosystems, erosion control, waterfowl conservation and fish habitats,
- manages the Saskatchewan Safe Drinking Water Strategy

== Dams, weirs, and reservoirs operated by the agency ==
The following is a list of dams, weirs, and reservoirs operated by the Saskatchewan Water Security Agency:

Name	LSD	Coordinates	Dam height (m)	Year built	Notes
Avonlea Dam	18-12-22 W2	49.9897°N 105.0033°W	16.6	1964	Upgraded in 2003
Blackstrap North Dam	21-33-03 W3	51.8467°N 106.3829°W	10.4	1967	Part of the South Saskatchewan River Project
Blackstrap South Dam	11-32-04 W3	51.7301°N 106.4741°W	7.9	1967	Part of the South Saskatchewan River Project
Bradwell East Dam	23-34-02 W3	51.9289°N 106.1747°W	5.8	1967	Part of the South Saskatchewan River Project
Bradwell West Dam	15-34-02 W3	51.9251°N 106.2076°W	3.7	1967	Part of the South Saskatchewan River Project
Brightwater Creek Dam	32-30-04 W3	51.6144°N 106.5358°W	14.0	1967	Part of the South Saskatchewan River Project
Broderick North Dam	14-29-07 W3	51.4759°N 106.8862°W	6.5	1967	Part of the South Saskatchewan River Project
Broderick West Dam	09-29-07 W3	51.4595°N 106.9155°W	8.8	1967	Part of the South Saskatchewan River Project
Buffalo Pound Dam	35-18-25 W2	50.5721°N 105.3313°W	5.7	1939	Upgraded in 2000
Candle Lake Dam	23-55-22 W2	53.7674°N 105.1611°W	3.4	1979	
Chicken Lake Dam	24-76-01 W2	55.6011°N 102.0189°W	2.4	1929	Upgraded in 1993
Cowan Lake Dam	16-60-10 W3	54.1935°N 107.4501°W	4.2	1937	Upgraded in 1971
Craven Dam	SW-24-20-21-W2M	50.7063°N 104.8001°W	4.9	1943	Regulates water flows on the Qu'Appelle River. It was upgraded in 2003
Crooked Lake Dam	SW-08-19A-05-W2M	50.5875°N 102.6650°W	3.5	1941	
Darmody Dam	08-20-02 W3	50.6766°N 106.2381°W	9.9	1929	
Dellwood Brook Dam	34-32-24 W2	51.7889°N 105.3223°W	9.4	1967	Part of the South Saskatchewan River Project
Duncairn Dam		50.0743°N 108.0462°W	19	1942	
Echo Lake Dam	NW-07-21-13-W2M	50.7717°N 103.7979°W	4	1942	
Esterhazy Dam	33-19-01 W2	50.6789°N 102.0880°W	7.9	1968	Built on Kaposvar Creek north of Esterhazy
Five Mile Dam	10-16-26 W2	50.3275°N 105.5071°W	2.7	1922	Built on the Moose Jaw River upstream from Moose Jaw
Gardiner Dam	01-27-07 W3	51.2667°N 106.8673°W	64	1967	Water source (Lake Diefenbaker) for the South Saskatchewan River Project
Grant Devine Dam	33-03-02-W2	49.2588°N 102.2307°W	42	1995	Formally known as Alameda Dam. Built in conjunction with Rafferty Dam
Hugonard Dam	11-21-13 W2	50.7685°N 103.7017°W	11.9	1957	
Katepwa Dam	27-19-12 W2	50.6627°N 103.6029°W	5	1957	Upgraded in 2005
Kingsway Dam	29-16-26 W2	50.3893°N 105.5019°W	5	1948	Built on the Moose Jaw River in the city of Moose Jaw. It was upgraded in 1985 and underwent repairs after unprecedented flooding in 2010 and 2011.
Kipahigan Lake Dam	16-75-01 W2	55.5054°N 102.0904°W	2.8	1985	
Lac la Plonge Dam	21-71-10 W3	55.1611°N 107.5092°W	1.7	1985	
Lac la Ronge Dam	26-73-17 W2	55.3358°N 104.5346°W	3.7	1966	Upgraded in 2007
Makwa Lake Control	11-59-22 W3	54.0822°N 109.2012°W	3.1	1965	Upgraded in 2010
Moose Mountain Dam	09-11-08 W2	49.8911°N 103.0319°W	5.7	1937	Upgraded in 2012
Moosomin Dam	NW 29-12-31 W1	50.0478°N 101.6905°W	13.5	1954	Upgraded in 2024
Northminster Effuent Reservoir	19-51-27 W3	53.4209°N 109.9632°W	25.3	1988	
Opuntia Lake Control	19-32-18 W3	51.7619°N 108.5464°W	2.1	1948	Upgraded in 1971
Pike Lake Water Supply	09-34-06 W3	51.9019°N 106.7921°W	1.5	1948	Upgraded in 1999
Qu'Appelle River Dam	25-23-04 W3	50.9879°N 106.4285°W	27.4	1967	
Rafferty Dam	25-02-09 W2	49.1522°N 103.0894°W	20.5	1991	Built in conjunction with Grant Devine Dam
Rafferty R3-2 Closure Dam	34-04-12-W2	49.3434°N 103.5351°W	12.1	1991	Built in conjunction with Rafferty Dam to contain McDonald Lake
Rafferty R4-1 Closure Dam	08-05-12-W2	49.3717°N 103.5805°W	10.3	1991	Built in conjunction with Rafferty Dam to contain McDonald Lake
Round Lake Dam	18-39-10 W2	52.3578°N 103.4242°W	2	1941	Upgraded in 1973 and 2000
Scott Dam	11-39-20 W3	52.3465°N 108.7771°W	14.5	1929	Upgraded in 2001
Spruce River Dam	13-54-01 W3	53.6663°N 106.0085°W	6.1	1960	
Star City Dam	29-44-18 W2	52.8131°N 104.5696°W	11.7	1967	Built on Melfort Creek upstream from Melfort. Upgraded in 1995
Stelcam Weir	19-15-24 W2	50.2722°N 105.3052°W	3	1912	Built on Moose Jaw River upstream from Moose Jaw. It was upgraded in 2002
Summercove Dam	28-04-08 W3	49.3278°N 107.0367°W	8.5	1949	Upgraded c. 1965
Tee-Pee Creek Dam	18-46-03 W2	52.9687°N 102.4279°W	3	1950	Upgraded in 1978
Theodore Dam	19-28-06 W2	51.4426°N 102.8382°W	14.6	1964	
Wascana Lake Weir	13-17-20 W2	50.4362°N 104.6181°W	2.4	1910	Upgrades c. 1973
West Poplar Dam	11-03-04 W3	49.1906°N 106.4415°W	9.9	1957	
Woody Lake Weir	27-40-30 W1	52.4655°N 101.6911°W	2.6	1978	Controls the outflow of Woody Lake. Upgraded in 1998
Valeport Dam	SE33-20-21-W2M	50.7292°N 104.8601°W	3.7	1939	Upgraded in 1958
Zelma Dam	23-33-28 W2	51.8424°N 105.8516°W	9.1	1967	Part of the South Saskatchewan River Project

== See also ==
- List of dams and reservoirs in Canada
- List of lakes of Saskatchewan
- SaskWater
