= Lanigan, Saskatchewan =

Town in Saskatchewan, Canada

Town of Lanigan The Land Of Potash
- Town
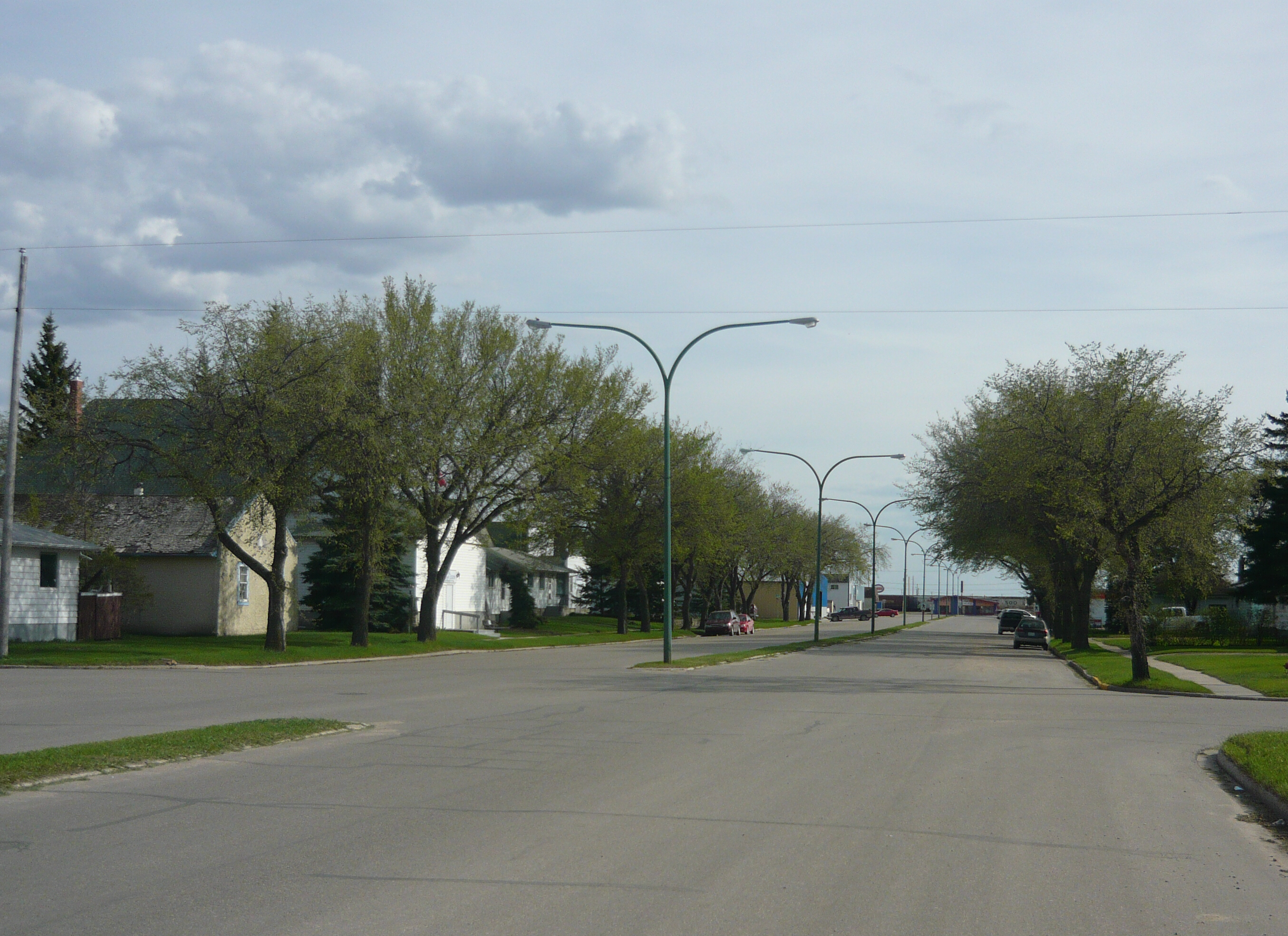
- Main Street

- Location of Lanigan in Saskatchewan Town of Lanigan (Canada)
- Coordinates: 51°51′N 105°02′W
- Country: Canada
- Province: Saskatchewan
- Founded: 1907
- Village Incorporated: August 21, 1907
- Town Incorporated: April 15, 1908

Population (2021)
  - Total: 1,433
- Time zone: CST
- Postal code: S0K 2M0
- Area code: 306
- Highways: Highway 16; Highway 20
- Website: Official Site

Lanigan (pop. 1,300) is a town in south-central Saskatchewan, Canada, at the intersection of Trans-Canada Yellowhead Highway 16 and Highway 20, approximately 117 kilometres (73 mi) east of Saskatoon and 170 kilometres (110 mi) north of Regina.

Lanigan is surrounded by the RM of Usborne No. 310 and is about 2 kilometres (1.2 mi) west of Lanigan Creek and about 10 kilometres (6.2 mi) west of Jansen Lake. The Quill Lakes are about 34 kilometres (21 mi) to the east along the Yellowhead Highway.

== Sports and recreation ==
The town of Lanigan has a wide variety of sporting activities and facilities, including a nine-hole grass green golf course, a 25-metre outdoor heated swimming pool, a curling rink with four sheets of ice, ball diamonds, camping, and tennis courts. At the heart of Lanigan is the Lanigan Recreation Complex featuring a skating rink, fully equipped kitchen, hall, and meeting room facilities. The complex is home to the Lanigan Pirates of the Long Lake Hockey League.

== Demographics ==
In the 2021 Census of Population conducted by Statistics Canada, Lanigan had a population of 1,433 living in 578 of its 651 total private dwellings, a change of 4.1% from its 2016 population of 1,377. With a land area of 8.14 km^{2} (3.14 sq mi), it had a population density of 176.0/km^{2} (456.0/sq mi) in 2021.

Canada census – Lanigan community profile

	2021	2011
Population	1,433 (+4.1% from 2016)	1,390 (12.7% from 2006)
Land area	8.14 km^{2} (3.14 sq mi)	8.34 km^{2} (3.22 sq mi)
Population density	176.1/km^{2} (456/sq mi)	166.8/km^{2} (432/sq mi)
Median age	42.0 (M: 39.6, F: 44.0)	42.3 (M: 39.1, F: 45.0)
Private dwellings	651 (total) 578 (occupied)	584 (total)
Median household income	$87,000

References: 2021 2011

== Notable people ==
- Bobby Baun, who is noted for scoring overtime winner for Toronto in a 1964 playoff game against Detroit, while playing with a fractured ankle
- Sheldon Brookbank, NHL player and member of 2013 Stanley Cup champion Chicago Blackhawks
- Wade Brookbank, NHL player with the Tampa Bay Lightning
- Brian Propp, former NHL player with the Philadelphia Flyers, Boston Bruins, Minnesota North Stars and Hartford Whalers

== See also ==
- List of towns in Saskatchewan
- List of communities in Saskatchewan
