= Broderick, Saskatchewan =

Village in Saskatchewan, Canada

Broderick
- Village
- Village of Broderick
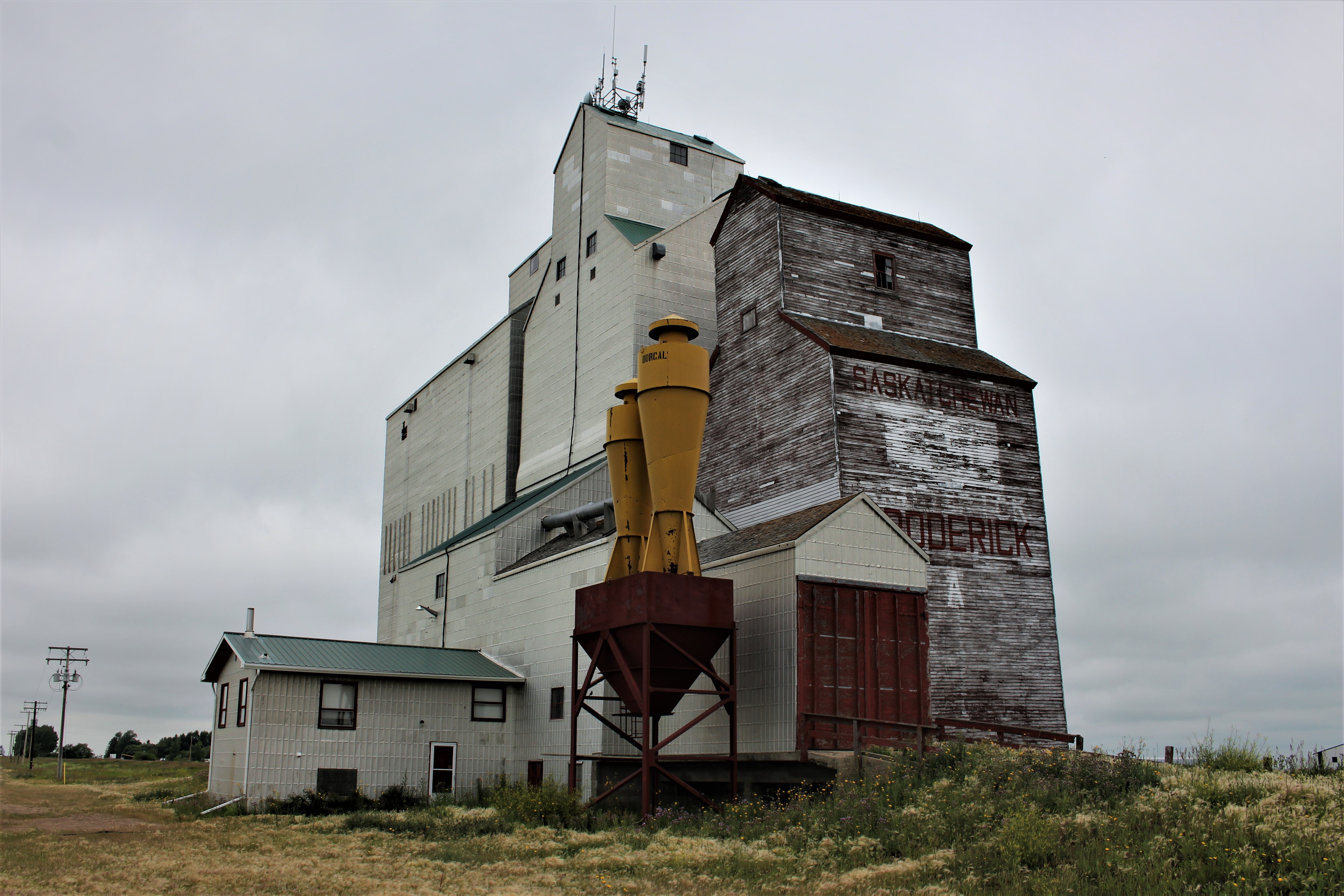
- Grain elevators in Broderick

- Location of Broderick in Saskatchewan Broderick (Canada)
- Coordinates: 51.512°N 106.912°W
- Country: Canada
- Province: Saskatchewan
- Region: West-central
- Census division: 11
- Rural municipality: Rudy No. 284
- Post office Founded: December 1, 1907

Government
  - Type: Municipal
  - Governing body: Broderick Village Council
  - Mayor: Arlin Simonson
  - Administrator: Shannon Pederson
  - MP: Kelly Block
  - MLA: Jim Reiter

Area
  - Total: 0.91 km^{2} (0.35 sq mi)

Population (2016)
  - Total: 85
  - Density: 93.9/km^{2} (243/sq mi)
- Time zone: UTC-6 (CST)
- Postal code: S0H 0L0
- Area code: 306
- Highways: Highway 15
- Railways: Canadian Pacific Railway (abandoned)

Broderick (2016 population: 85) is a village in the Canadian province of Saskatchewan within the Rural Municipality of Rudy No. 284 and Census Division No. 11. The village is approximately 5 kilometres (3.1 mi) east of the town of Outlook.

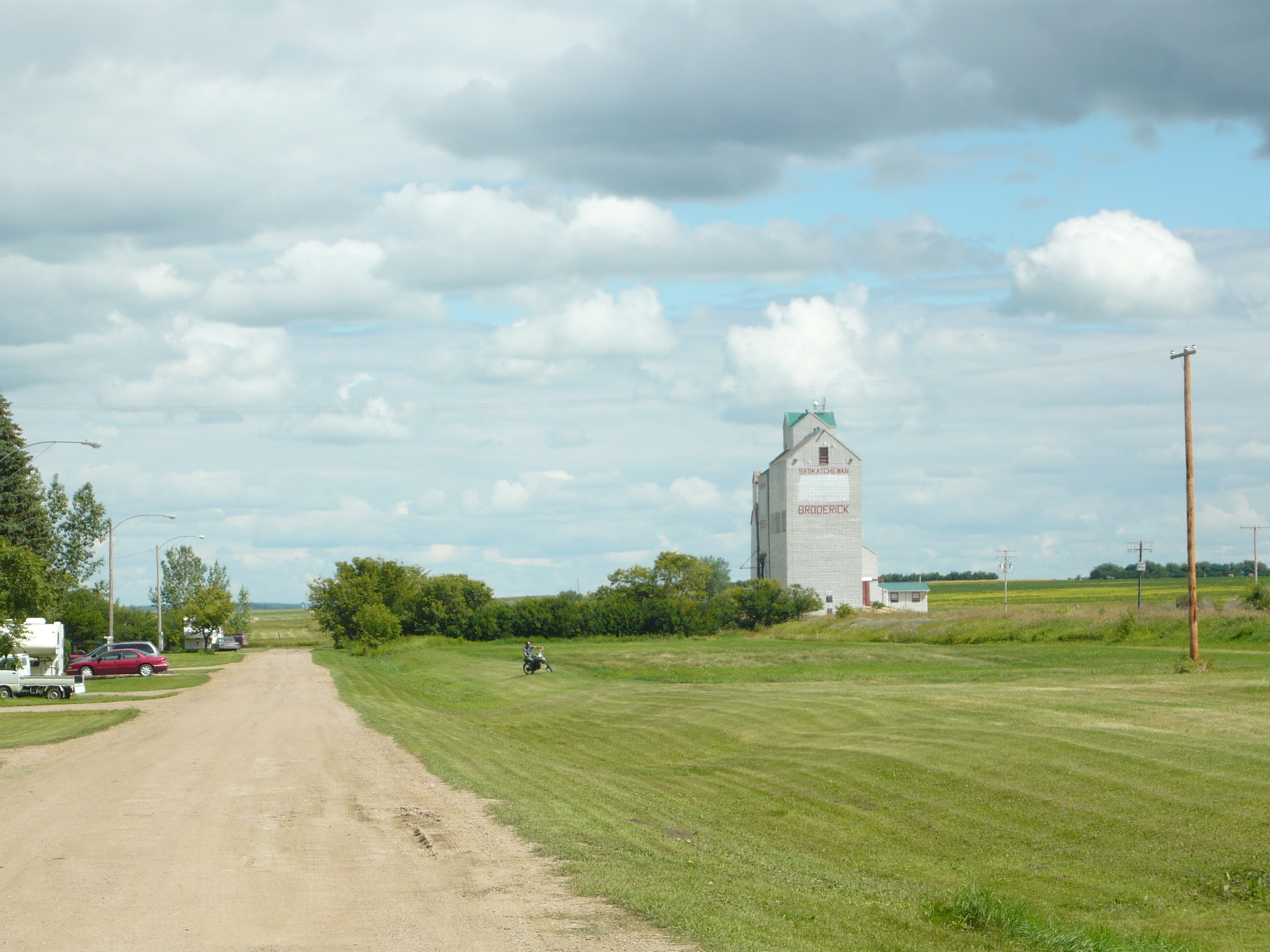
Looking down Railway Avenue towards the former Saskatchewan Wheat Pool elevator

== History ==
The post office was originally established under the name Chromar on December 1, 1907, but its name was changed to Broderick on January 1, 1909. Broderick incorporated as a village on September 13, 1909.

== Demographics ==
Population history (1981–2016)
Year	Pop.	±%
1981	101	—
1986	117	+15.8%
1991	93	−20.5%
1996	86	−7.5%
2001	83	−3.5%
2006	77	−7.2%
2011	71	−7.8%
2016	85	+19.7%
Source: Statistics Canada via Saskatchewan Bureau of Statistics

In the 2021 Census of Population conducted by Statistics Canada, Broderick had a population of 96 living in 37 of its 44 total private dwellings, a change of 12.9% from its 2016 population of 85. With a land area of 0.77 km^{2} (0.30 sq mi), it had a population density of 124.7/km^{2} (322.9/sq mi) in 2021.

In the 2016 Census of Population, the village of Broderick recorded a population of 85 living in 35 of its 37 total private dwellings, a 16.5% change from its 2011 population of 71. With a land area of 0.91 km^{2} (0.35 sq mi), it had a population density of 93.4/km^{2} (241.9/sq mi) in 2016.

== Notable people ==
- John Sopinka, former puisne justice on the Supreme Court of Canada.

== See also ==
- List of communities in Saskatchewan
- List of villages in Saskatchewan
- List of francophone communities in Saskatchewan
- Broderick Reservoir
