= Dundurn, Saskatchewan =

Town in Saskatchewan, Canada

Dundurn
- Town
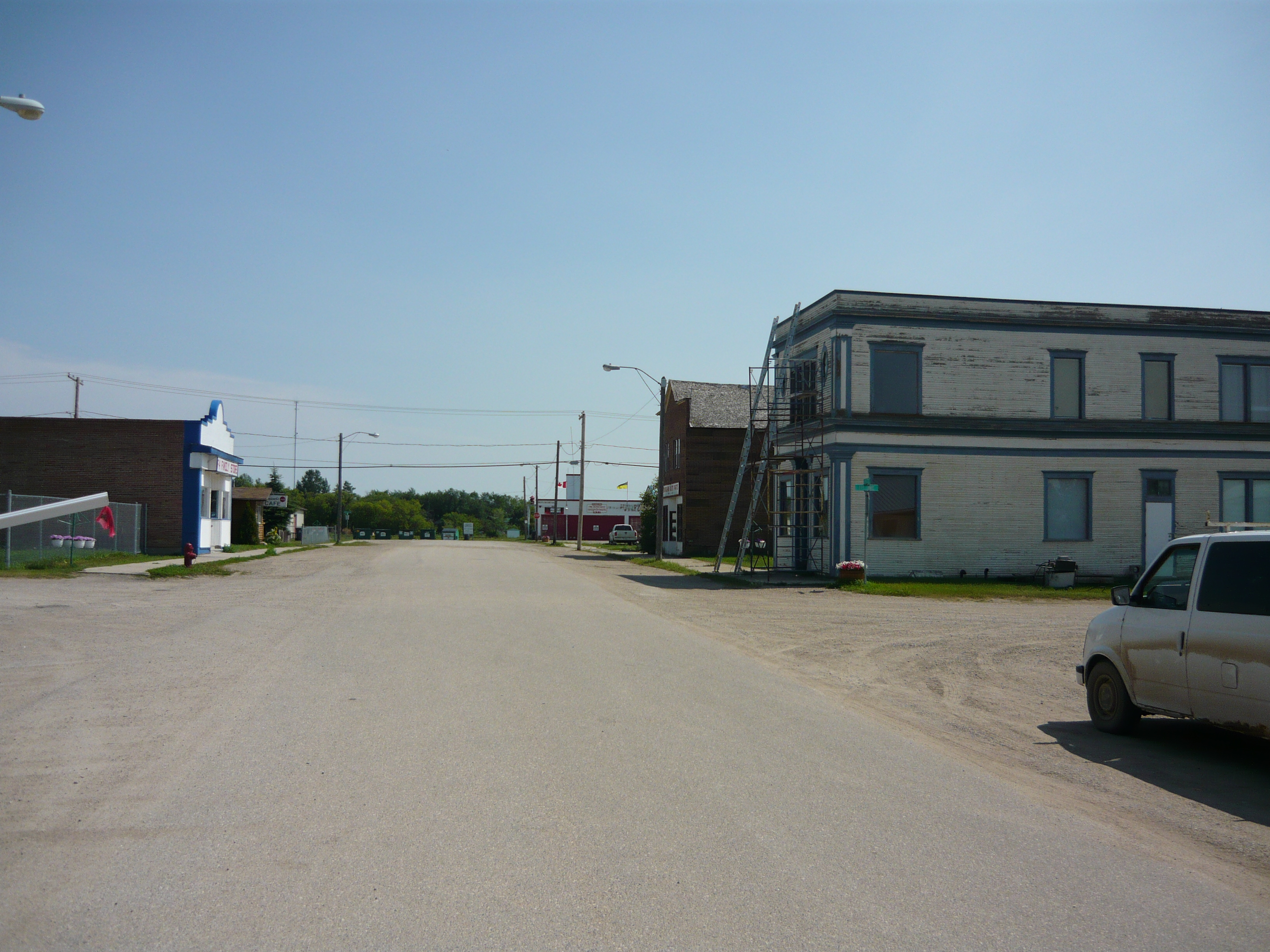
- Dundurn's Business District: 2nd Street

- Location of Dundurn in Saskatchewan Dundurn (Canada)
- Coordinates: 51°49′N 106°30′W
- Country: Canada
- Province: Saskatchewan
- Rural municipality (RM): Dundurn No. 314
- Post office Founded in NWT: 1894-09-01
- Village: 1905
- Town: 1980

Government
  - Mayor: Matt Jurkiewicz

Area
  - Land: .88 km^{2} (0.34 sq mi)

Population (2021)
  - Total: 675
  - Density: 736.88/km^{2} (1,908.5/sq mi)
  - Summer (DST): CST
- Postal code: S0K 1K0
- Website: Official website

Dundurn is a town of 647 residents surrounded by the RM of Dundurn No. 314, in the Canadian province of Saskatchewan. Dundurn is located on Highway 11, or Louis Riel Trail, in central Saskatchewan, about 42 km south of Saskatoon. As well as being an agricultural town, it is a bedroom community for both Saskatoon and Canadian Forces Detachment Dundurn, which is located 6 kilometres (4 mi) north of town and is a detachment of 17 Wing Winnipeg.

The town is situated between Highway 11 and the north end of Brightwater Lake, with Swamp Lake directly north of town. Dundurn is run under a mayor-council form of civic governance.

== History ==
The Regina Branch of the Canadian National Railway (CNR) came through in 1889.

== Demographics ==
In the 2021 Census of Population conducted by Statistics Canada, Dundurn had a population of 675 living in 257 of its 269 total private dwellings, a change of 10.5% from its 2016 population of 611. With a land area of 1.48 km^{2} (0.57 sq mi), it had a population density of 456.1/km^{2} (1,181.2/sq mi) in 2021.

Canada census – Dundurn community profile

	2021	2011
Population	675 (+10.5% from 2016)	693 (7.1% from 2006)
Land area	1.48 km^{2} (0.57 sq mi)	1.37 km^{2} (0.53 sq mi)
Population density	456.7/km^{2} (1,183/sq mi)	505.3/km^{2} (1,309/sq mi)
Median age	36.4 (M: 35.2, F: 37.6)	34.8 (M: 35.0, F: 34.8)
Private dwellings	269 (total) 257 (occupied)	263 (total)
Median household income	$94,000

References: 2021 2011

== Education ==
Students in kindergarten to grade six are able to attend school at Dundurn Elementary School. After graduation, students can acquire further education in Hanley, Saskatchewan at Hanley Composite School, which is a kindergarten to grade 12 school.

== Sites of interest ==
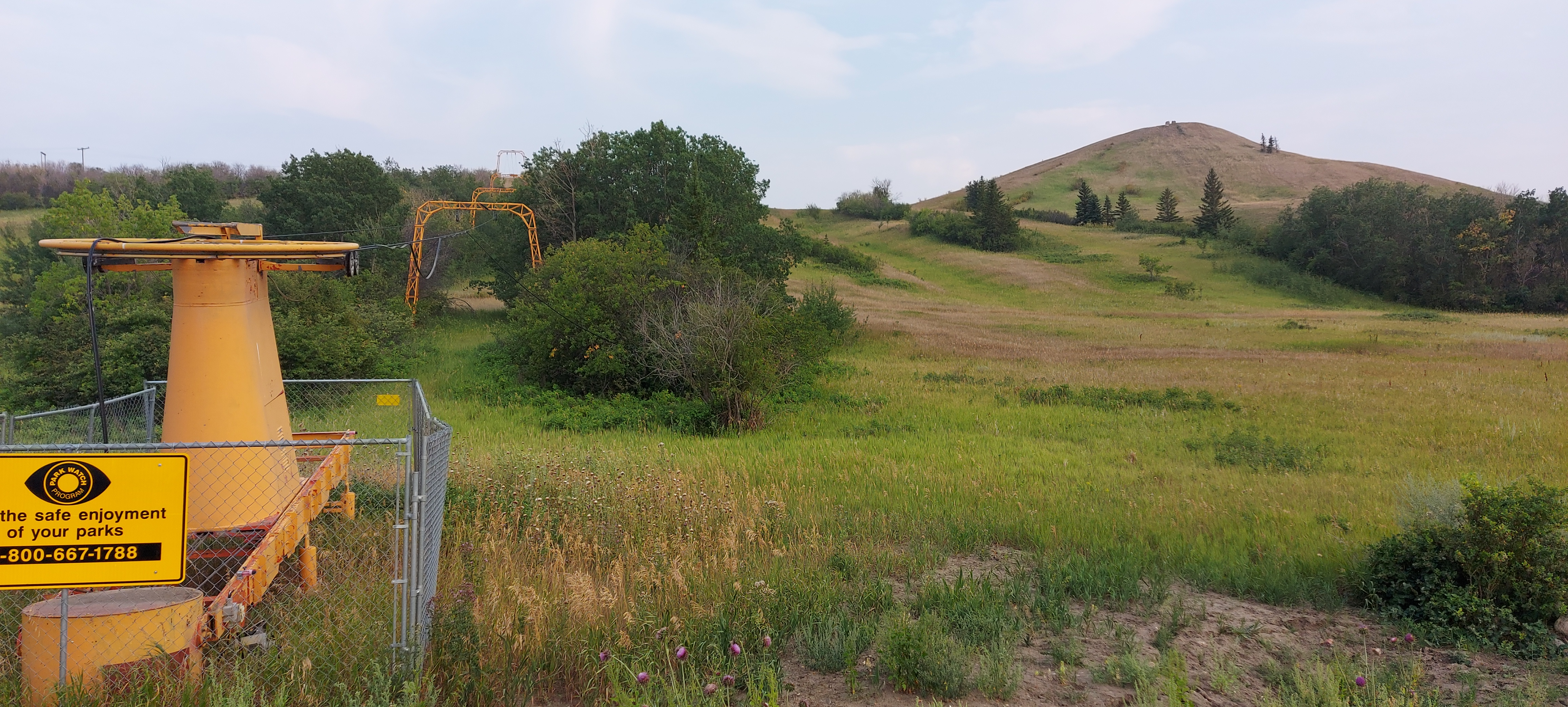
The abandoned ski lift on Mount Blackstrap in Blackstrap Provincial Park

Blackstrap Provincial Park is a conservation and recreation area with a man-made lake, Blackstrap Lake, a man-made mountain, Mount Blackstrap, that is located 7 kilometres (4 mi) east of town. Between 1969 and 1970, Mount Blackstrap was constructed as a ski hill to host the 1971 Canada Winter Games, which were awarded to Saskatoon. The ski hill remained open to the public until 2008 and is now abandoned.

Dakota Dunes Casino and associated Dakota Dunes Links Golf course is nearby on the Whitecap Dakota First Nation. The casino and convention centre opened in 2007. CFB Dundurn Golf Club is located at CFD Dundurn, a short distance from the town of Dundurn.

The roadside attractions Bone Gatherer and Horse and Wagon are two additions on Highway 11.

Wilson Museum which is hosted in three buildings one of which is the Woodview School is located in the town of Dundurn.

== Heritage buildings ==
The town has three designated heritage properties:

- Dundurn Community Centre (formerly Dundurn School or Old Brick School) — The building was built in 1916, by the Bigelow Bros. with R. M. Thomson as the architect. The building served as a school from 1916 until 1980. Today the building is used as a community centre.
- Old Bank Building (formally Northern Bank; Northern Crown Bank; Dundurn Post Office) — Originally built 1906 as a two-story wood-frame bank building housing the Northern Bank (Canada), Northern Crown Bank, and Royal Bank. The building housed a post office from 1935 until 1957.
- Dundurn Moravian Brethren Church (also called the United Church of Dundurn building) — The church was constructed as a joint church building housing the Anglican, Methodist, Presbyterian, and Moravian members communities. The church was a joint-stock company owned by the member denominations.

== See also ==
- List of towns in Saskatchewan
