= Bradwell Reservoir =

Reservoir in Saskatchewan, Canada

- Location in Saskatchewan Bradwell Reservoir (Canada)
- Location: RM of Blucher No. 343, Saskatchewan
- Coordinates: 51.9334°N 106.1839°W
- Type: Reservoir
- Etymology: Village of Bradwell
- Part of: Saskatchewan River drainage basin
- Primary inflows: Aqueduct originating at Lake Diefenbaker
- Basin countries: Canada
- Managing agency: Saskatchewan Water Security Agency
- Built: 1967
- First flooded: 1967
- Max. length: 2.4 km (1.5 mi)
- Surface area: 145.4 ha (359 acres)
- Max. depth: 5.2 m (17 ft)
- Water volume: 4,440 dam^{3} (3,600 acre⋅ft)
- Shore length^{1}: 6.9 km (4.3 mi)
- Settlements: None
- ^{1} Shore length is not a well-defined measure.

Bradwell Reservoir is a man-made reservoir in the Canadian province of Saskatchewan in the Rural Municipality of Blucher No. 343. The reservoir was built as part of the South Saskatchewan River Project. That project involved the damming of the South Saskatchewan River with the Gardiner and Qu'Appelle River Dams creating Lake Diefenbaker. From Lake Diefenbaker, a series of aqueducts were built allowing for irrigation and the creation of several reservoirs, including Bradwell Reservoir. The reservoir is owned and operated by the Saskatchewan Water Security Agency. Bradwell Reservoir supplies water to the Nutrien Allan Potash Mine near Allan.

== Description ==
Bradwell Reservoir was created in 1967 with the construction of two dams — Bradwell West Dam at 3.7 m (12 ft) high and Bradwell East Dam at 5.8 m (19 ft) high. The total water volume at full supply is 4,440 dam^{3} (3,600 acre⋅ft). Water is supplied via the aqueduct from Lake Diefenbaker, which is about 100 kilometres (62 mi) to the south-west. Upstream from Bradwell Reservoir is Bradwell National Wildlife Area and Blackstrap Lake.

Access to the reservoir is from Bradwell Reservoir Beach at the north-east corner, north of Bradwell East Dam. A short road connects the beach to Highway 763. Recreation activities, such as boating and fishing, are permitted.

== Fish species ==
Fish commonly found in Bradwell Reservoir include northern pike, walleye, and yellow perch.

== See also ==
- List of lakes of Saskatchewan
- SaskWater
- Dams and reservoirs in Saskatchewan
