= Brightwater Creek =

River in Saskatchewan, Canada

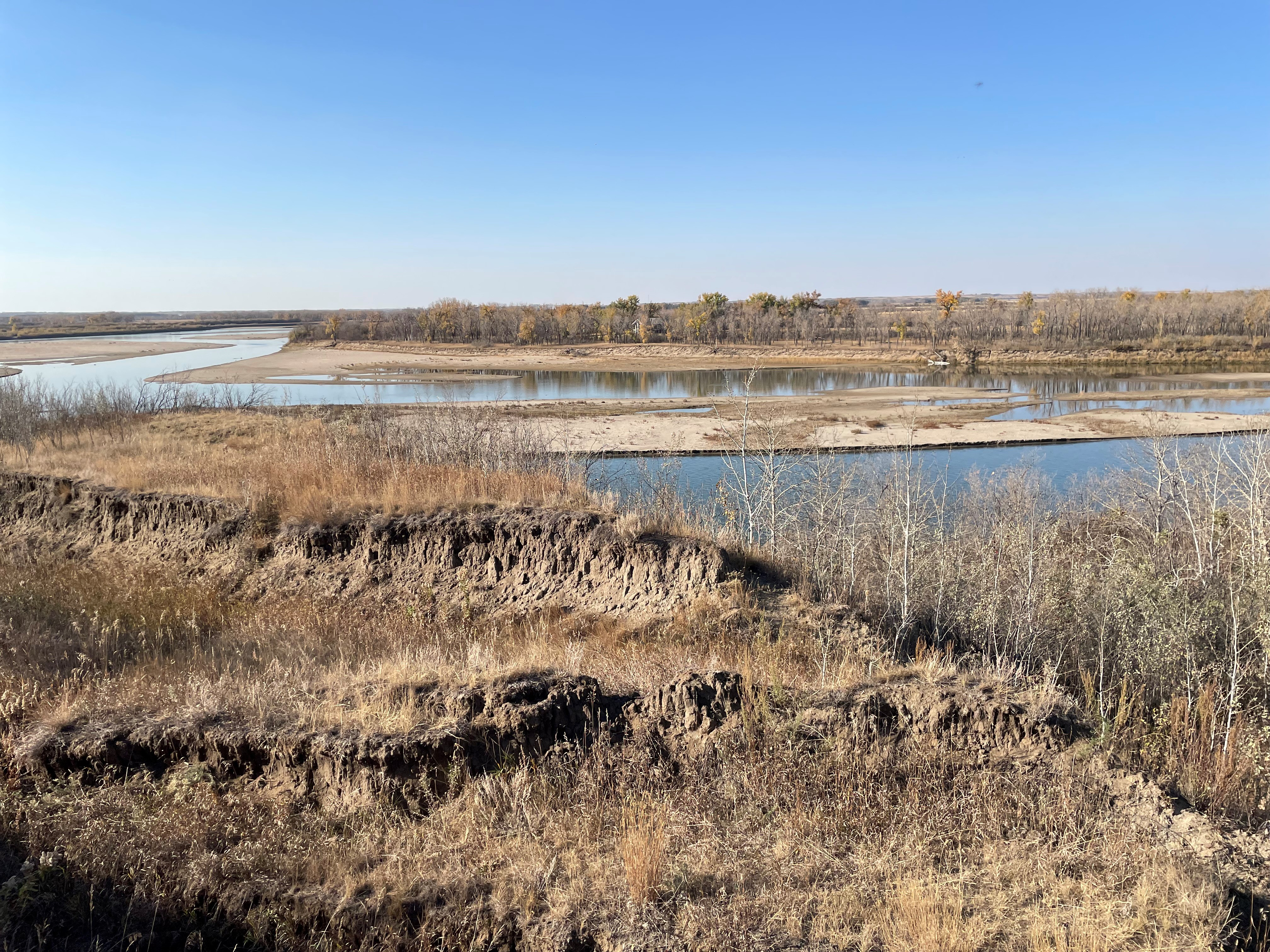
- Beaver Creek Conservation Area at the confluence of Brightwater Creek and South Saskatchewan River

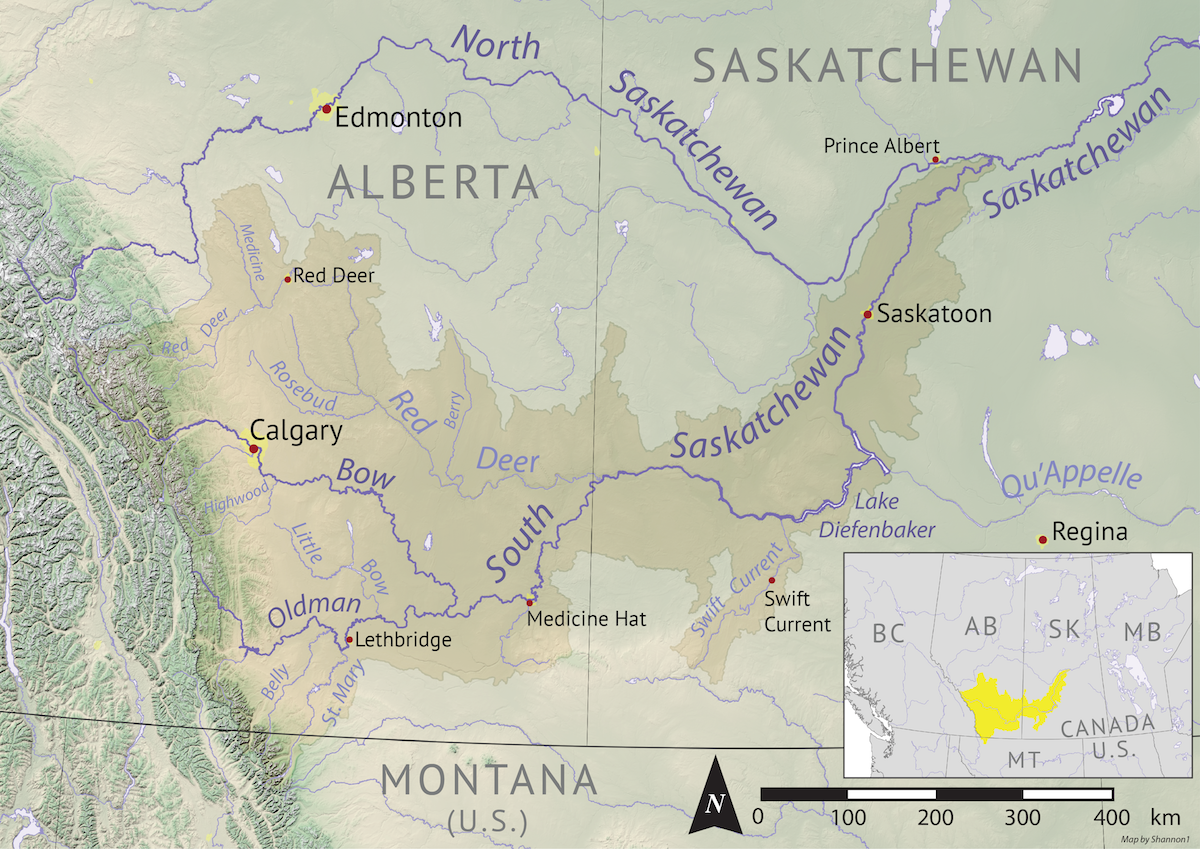
- The South Saskatchewan River drainage basin

- Location in Saskatchewan Brightwater Creek (Canada)

Location
- Country: Canada
- Provinces: Saskatchewan

Physical characteristics
- Source
  - location: RM of Rosedale No. 283
  - coordinates: 51.3679°N 106.2919°W
- Mouth: South Saskatchewan River
  - location: RM of Corman Park No. 344
  - coordinates: 51.9813°N 106.7239°W
- Length: 270 km (170 mi)

Basin features
- River system: Saskatchewan River

Brightwater Creek is a river in south central part of Saskatchewan, Canada. It is a tributary of the South Saskatchewan River in a region called the Prairie Pothole Region of North America, which extends throughout three Canadian provinces and five U.S. states. It is also within Palliser's Triangle and the Great Plains ecoregion. Along the river's course there is a dam and reservoir and a regional park. There are no communities along its course.

== Course ==
Brightwater Creek starts south of Kenaston in the south-east corner of the RM of Rosedale No. 283. After a short jog west, it turns north and travels in a north-northwest direction, passing Highway 15 about 12 kilometres (7.5 mi) west of Kenaston, until it flows into Brightwater Reservoir. Brightwater Reservoir was created by the building of the Brightwater Creek Dam in 1967 as part of the South Saskatchewan River Project, which included the building of Gardiner Dam and the creation of Lake Diefenbaker. From the dam, the river takes a meandering course northwards and crosses Highway 764. Then it travels north towards Indi Lake, past the closed basin Proctor Lake, and into Brightwater Lake. Indi Lake flows to Brightwater Creek via a short stream. At the northern end of Brightwater Lake, at the point where the river leaves the lake, is the town of Dundurn. From there, the river travels north past Camp Dundurn and empties into the South Saskatchewan River.

== Beaver Creek Conservation Area ==
Beaver Creek Conservation Area (51.9796°N 106.7159°W) is a regional park that was founded in 1979 and is operated by the Meewasin Valley Authority. It is accessed from Highway 219, about 13 kilometres (8.1 mi) south of Saskatoon, and located on the estuary of Brightwater Creek at the South Saskatchewan River. The community of Beaver Creek is about 5 kilometres (3.1 mi) from the park.

The interpretive centre was built in 1984 and offers interactive activities for school groups. There are three different trails, Living Sky, Beaver Creek Discovery, and Beaver Creek River View, that traverse the park. The trails are accessible by walking, biking, and, in the winter, cross-country skiing.

The land the park encompasses has been used as a nature park since 1913 and protects the local habitat, including sand dunes, forests, prairie grasslands, river valleys, and marshes. Animals, birds, and plants such as deer, fox, beaver, chickadee, smooth goosefoot, and the common nighthawk are commonly found in the park.

== Brightwater Reservoir ==
Brightwater Reservoir (51.6001°N 106.5339°W) is a man-made lake in the RM of Rosedale No. 283 created in 1967 when Brightwater Creek Dam, an embankment dam, was built on the Brightwater Creek. The reservoir has a surface area of 235 ha (580 acres) and a maximum volume of 12,631 dam^{3} (10,240 acre⋅ft). The dam is located at the north end of the lake and is 14 m (46 ft) high. Brightwater Creek enters the lake from the south while the aqueduct inflow is located at the west end of the dam. The outflows are at the east end of the dam. The outlet for the aqueduct is referred to as the riparian outlet.

The aqueduct system is part of the South Saskatchewan River Project. The portion of aqueduct that flows into Brightwater Reservoir originates at Gardiner Dam from Lake Diefenbaker. Another reservoir, Broderick Reservoir, is along the same aqueduct en route from Lake Diefenbaker. After the aqueduct leaves Brightwater Reservoir, it heads directly north towards Indi Lake. While Brightwater Creek runs along the west side of Indi Lake, the aqueduct runs along the east side en route to Blackstrap Lake.

== Brightwater Lake ==
Brightwater Lake (51.7667°N 106.5446°W), also known as Brightwater Marsh, is a shallow, oval-shaped marshy lake along the course of Brightwater Creek. The area covered by the lake is approximately 8 kilometres (5.0 mi) long by 1 kilometre (0.62 mi) wide. Brightwater Creek enters the lake from the south and exits it from the north, near the town of Dundurn. During dry years, the lake almost completely dries up. It is 515 metres (1,690 ft) above sea level.

== Fishing ==
Fishing is allowed on Brightwater Creek; the most popular species caught are northern pike and yellow perch.

== See also ==
- List of rivers of Saskatchewan
- List of lakes of Saskatchewan
- List of dams in Saskatchewan
- Saskatchewan Water Security Agency
- List of protected areas of Saskatchewan
