= SaskWater =

Water company in Saskatchewan, Canada

Saskatchewan Water Corporation
- Trade name: SaskWater
- Company type: Crown Corporation
- Industry: Water supply
- Predecessor: Saskatchewan Water Supply Board
- Founded: 1984
- Headquarters: Moose Jaw, Saskatchewan, Canada
- Products: Water
- Owner: Government of Saskatchewan
- Number of employees: 133.4 FTE (2024/25)
- Parent: Crown Investments Corporation
- Website: saskwater.com

Saskatchewan Water Corporation, operating as SaskWater, is a Crown corporation owned by the Government of Saskatchewan and supplies water, wastewater and related services to municipalities, industries and farms. In turn, municipalities supply water to their residents. SaskWater has operations in Moose Jaw, Watrous, Prince Albert, Saskatoon, Hanley, Wakaw, Melfort, Regina, Elbow, Gravelbourg, and Meota.

== See also ==
- Saskatchewan Water Security Agency
