= List of communities in Saskatchewan =

Location of Saskatchewan in Canada

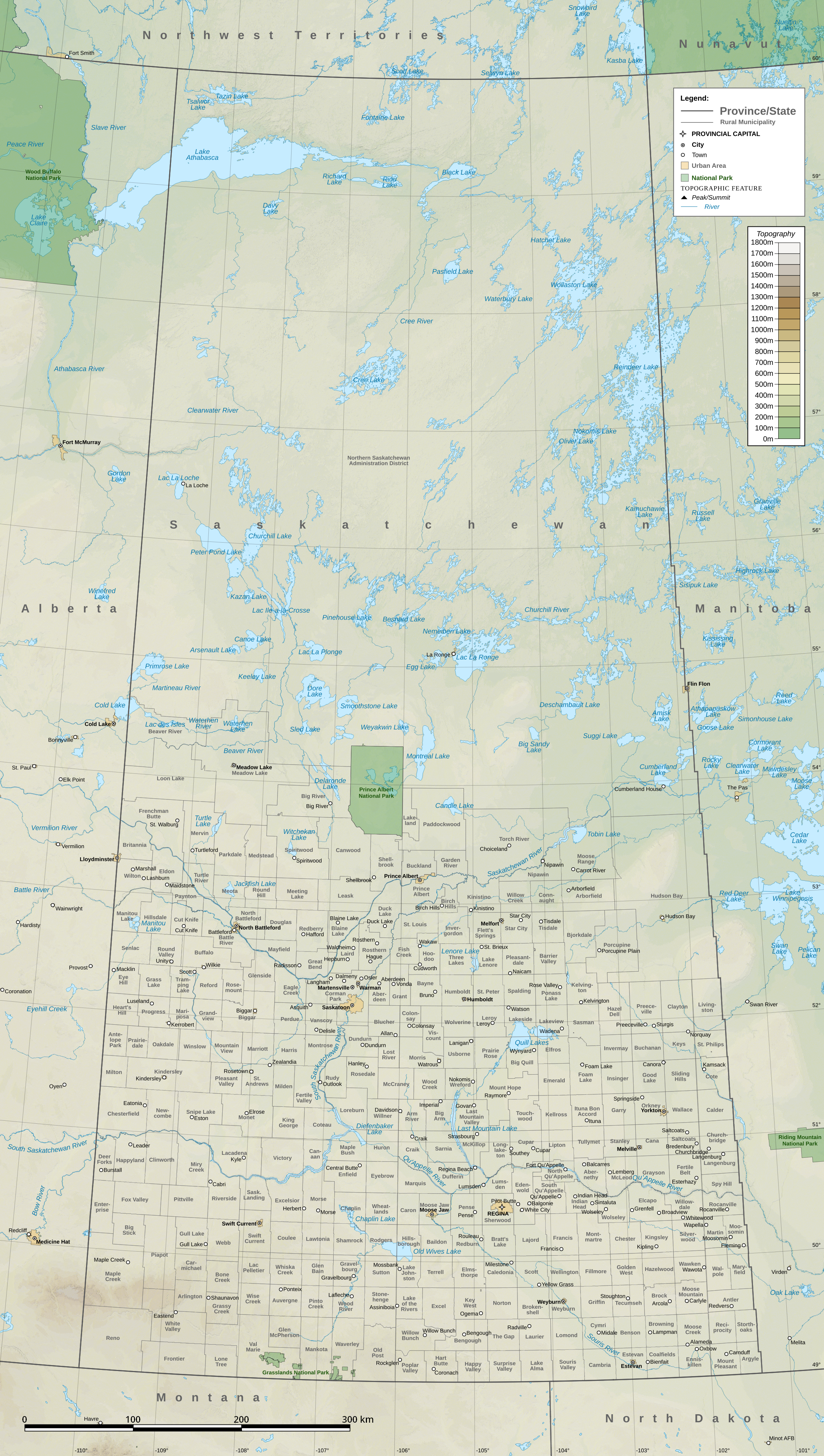
A topographic map of Saskatchewan, showing cities, towns, rural municipality borders, and natural features

Communities in the province of Saskatchewan, Canada, include incorporated municipalities, unincorporated communities and First Nations communities.

Types of incorporated municipalities include urban municipalities, rural municipalities and northern municipalities. Urban municipalities are further classified into four sub-types – cities, towns, villages and resort villages. Northern municipalities, which are located in the Northern Saskatchewan Administration District (NSAD), are further classified into three sub-types – northern towns, northern villages and northern hamlets. Rural municipalities are not classified into sub-types.

Types of unincorporated communities include hamlets and organized hamlets within rural municipalities and northern settlements within the NSAD.

The administration of rural municipalities, towns, villages, resort villages, organized hamlets and hamlets is regulated by The Municipalities Act, while the administration of cities is regulated by The Cities Act. Administration of northern towns, northern villages, northern hamlets and northern settlements (those within the NSAD) is regulated by The Northern Municipalities Act.

In the 2021 census, Saskatchewan's communities combined for a total provincial population of 1,132,505.

== Municipalities ==
Saskatchewan presently has 786 municipalities of various types (urban, rural and northern municipalities) and sub-types (cities, towns, villages, resort villages, northern towns, northern villages and northern hamlets).

=== Urban municipalities ===
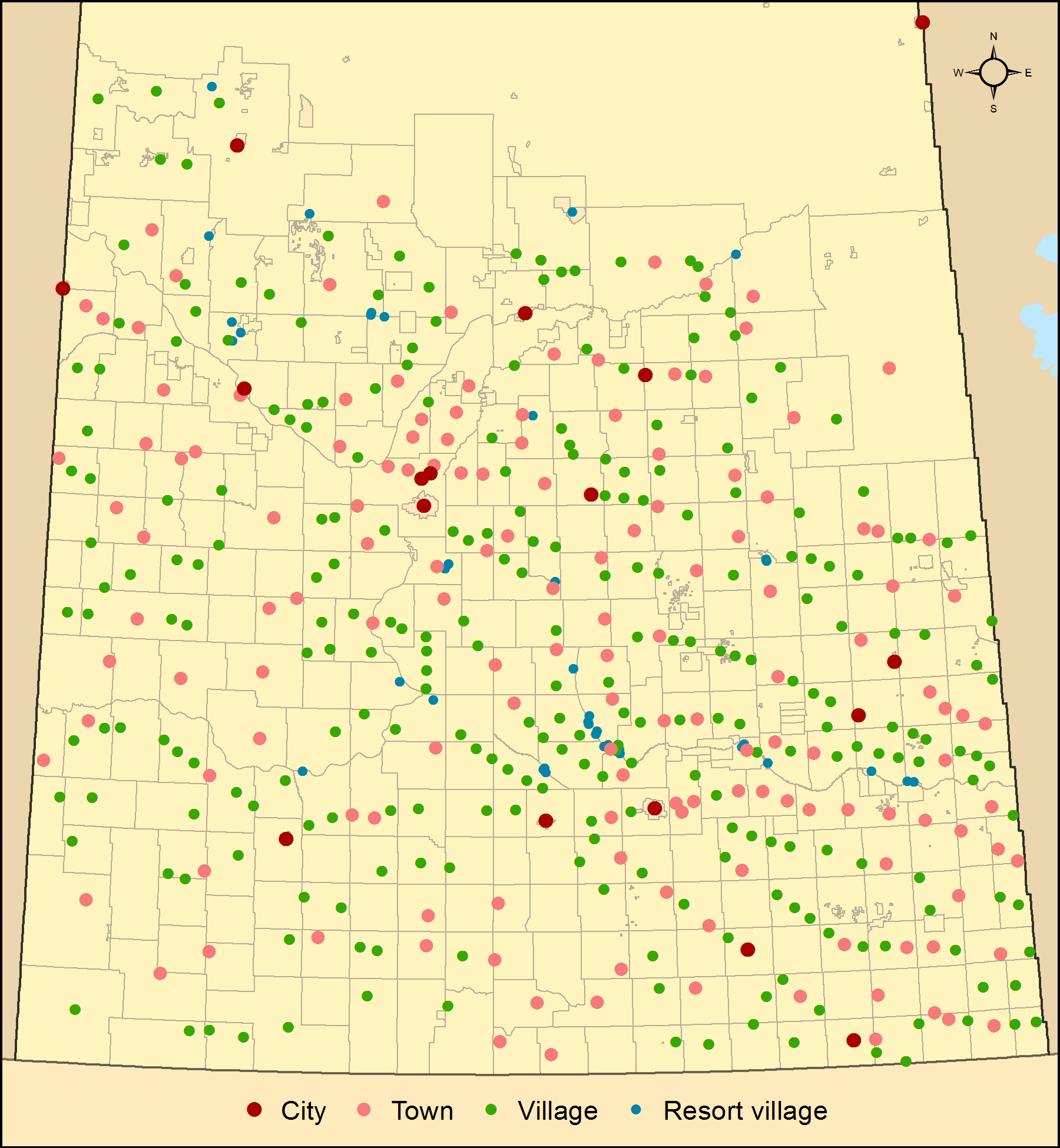
Distribution of Saskatchewan's 16 cities, 146 towns, 264 villages and 40 resort villages

Saskatchewan has 466 urban municipalities, which includes the sub-types of cities, towns, villages and resort villages.

==== Cities ====
In Saskatchewan, towns must have a population above 5,000 in order to be granted city status. A city does not automatically revert to town status if the population drops below 5,000; this only occurs if the city council requests it, the majority of electors vote to revert to town status or the appropriate provincial minister is of the opinion that the reversion to town status is in the public interest. The city of Melville retains city status as of 2010 despite dropping below 5,000 population in the 1990s.

Saskatchewan has 16 cities, including Lloydminster and not including Flin Flon.

Cities of Saskatchewan
Name	Rural municipality	(city)	(2021)	(2016)	Change (%)	(km^{2})	(sq mi)	(/km^{2})	(/sq mi)		
Name	Rural municipality	Estevan	Estevan No. 5	March 1, 1957	10,851	11,483	−5.5%	18.30	7.07	593.0	1,536
Flin Flon (part) (Note: The balance of Flin Flon is located within Manitoba.)	—	—	159 (Note: This population does not include 4,940 in the Manitoba portion of Flin Flon. The city's total population in 2021 was 5,099.)	203	−21.7%	2.01 (Note: This area does not include 13.14 km^{2} (5.07 mi^{2}) in the Manitoba portion of Flin Flon. The city's total area in 2021 was 15.15 km^{2} (5.85 mi^{2}).)	0.78	79.1	205		
Humboldt	Humboldt No. 370	November 7, 2000	6,033	5,869	+2.8%	13.30	5.14	453.6	1,175		
Lloydminster (part) (Note: The balance of Lloydminster is located within Alberta.)	Britannia No. 502; Wilton No. 472	January 1, 1958	11,843 (Note: This population does not include 19,739 in the Alberta portion of Lloydminster. The city's total population in 2021 was 31,582.)	11,765	+0.7%	18.06 (Note: This area does not include 23.98 km^{2} (9.26 mi^{2}) in the Alberta portion of Lloydminster. The city's total area in 2021 was 42.04 km^{2} (16.23 mi^{2}).)	6.97	655.8	1,699		
Martensville (Note: Martensville is Saskatchewan's smallest city by area.)	Corman Park No. 344	November 3, 2009	10,549	9,655	+9.3%	13.56	5.24	777.9	2,015		
Meadow Lake	Meadow Lake No. 588	November 9, 2009	5,322	5,344	−0.4%	12.37	4.78	430.2	1,114		
Melfort	Star City No. 428	September 2, 1980	5,955	5,992	−0.6%	14.73	5.69	404.3	1,047		
Melville (Note: Melville is Saskatchewan's smallest city by population.)	Cana No. 214	August 1, 1960	4,493	4,562	−1.5%	14.78	5.71	304.0	787		
Moose Jaw	Moose Jaw No. 161	November 20, 1903	33,665	33,910	−0.7%	65.81	25.41	511.5	1,325		
North Battleford	North Battleford No. 437	May 1, 1913	13,836	14,315	−3.3%	33.55	12.95	412.4	1,068		
Prince Albert	Prince Albert No. 461	October 8, 1904	37,756	35,926	+5.1%	67.17	25.93	562.1	1,456		
Regina (Note: Regina is Saskatchewan's capital and was its first city, incorporated June 19, 1903. The Regina census metropolitan area (CMA) is formed around the City of Regina.)	Sherwood No. 159	June 19, 1903	226,404	215,106	+5.3%	178.81	69.04	1,266.2	3,279		
Saskatoon (Note: Saskatoon is Saskatchewan's largest city by both population and area. The Saskatoon CMA includes the cities of Martensville and Saskatoon.)	Corman Park No. 344	May 26, 1906	266,141	247,201	+7.7%	226.56	87.48	1,174.7	3,042		
Swift Current	Swift Current No. 137	January 15, 1914	16,750	16,604	+0.9%	29.30	11.31	571.7	1,481		
Warman (Note: Warman is Saskatchewan's newest city, incorporated October 27, 2012.)	Corman Park No. 344	October 27, 2012	12,419	11,020	+12.7%	13.10	5.06	948.0	2,455		
Weyburn	Weyburn No. 67	September 1, 1913	11,019	10,870	+1.4%	19.03	7.35	579.0	1,500		
Yorkton	Orkney No. 244	February 1, 1928	16,280	16,343	−0.4%	36.19	13.97	449.8	1,165		
Total cities	—	—	689,475	656,168	+5.1%	776.63	299.86	887.8	2,299		

==== Towns ====
In Saskatchewan, towns are formed from villages or resort villages with a population of at least 500 people. The council of the village or resort village must request the change to town status. When a town's population exceeds 5,000 people, the council may request a change to city status, but the change in incorporation level is not mandatory. Towns with shrinking populations are allowed to retain town status even if the number of residents falls below the 500 limit. For example, the towns of Fleming, Francis, and Scott have populations that have dropped under 500 people and are still qualified under town status. Towns with populations below the limit may, however, revert to village or resort village status if the town council requests it.

Saskatchewan has 146 towns.

Towns of Saskatchewan
Name	Rural municipality (RM)	Population (2021)	Population (2016)	Population (2011)	Population (2006)	Change (%)	Land area (km^{2})	Population density (per km^{2})
Aberdeen	Aberdeen No. 373	716	662	599	527	13.7	1.95	307
Alameda	Moose Creek No. 33	345	369	342	308	11	2.55	133.9
Allan	Blucher No. 343	625	644	648	631	2.7	1.78	363.2
Arborfield	Arborfield No. 456	285	312	326	329	−0.9	0.88	370.5
Arcola	Brock No. 64	636	657	649	509	27.5	3.39	191.5
Asquith	Vanscoy No. 345	624	639	603	576	4.7	1.23	491.4
Assiniboia	Lake of the Rivers No. 72	2,333	2,424	2,418	2,305	4.9	3.78	639.8
Balcarres	Abernethy No. 186	616	587	617	598	3.2	1.57	392.9
Balgonie	Edenwold No. 158	1,756	1,765	1,625	1,384	17.4	3.15	515.8
Battleford	Battle River No. 438	4,400	4,429	4,065	3,685	10.3	23.33	174.2
Bengough	Bengough No. 40	332	332	313	337	−7.1	1.07	292
Bienfait	Coalfields No. 4	668	762	780	748	4.3	3.09	252.4
Big River	Big River No. 555	666	700	639	728	−12.2	2.51	255
Biggar	Biggar No. 347	2,133	2,226	2,161	2,033	6.3	15.75	137.2
Birch Hills	Birch Hills No. 460	1,066	1,033	1,064	935	13.8	2.27	468.4
Blaine Lake	Blaine Lake No. 434	509	499	510	472	8.1	1.95	261.6
Bredenbury	Saltcoats No. 213	386	372	364	329	10.6	4.8	75.8
Broadview	Elcapo No. 154	541	552	574	611	−6.1	2.45	233.8
Bruno	Bayne No. 371	604	611	574	495	16	0.95	606.1
Burstall	Deer Forks No. 232	302	278	301	315	−4.4	1.11	270
Cabri	Riverside No. 168	413	390	399	439	−9.1	1.33	298.9
Canora	Good Lake No. 274	2,092	2,024	2,219	2,013	10.2	7.31	303.7
Carlyle	Moose Mountain No. 63	1,524	1,508	1,441	1,257	14.6	3.19	451.1
Carnduff	Mount Pleasant No. 2	1,150	1,099	1,126	1,012	11.3	2.26	497.3
Carrot River	Moose Range No. 486	946	973	1,000	941	6.3	1.42	706.4
Central Butte	Enfield No. 194	416	372	365	372	−1.9	2.24	163.2
Choiceland	Torch River No. 488	342	359	381	346	10.1	1.12	340.8
Churchbridge	Churchbridge No. 211	866	896	743	704	5.5	2.76	269.2
Colonsay	Colonsay No. 342	446	451	475	425	11.8	2.46	193.1
Coronach	Hart Butte No. 11	612	643	711	770	−7.7	2.33	304.9
Craik	Craik No. 222	405	392	453	408	11	3.02	150
Cudworth	Hoodoo No. 401	772	814	770	738	4.3	2.21	348.7
Cupar	Cupar No. 218	598	564	579	566	2.3	0.8	726.7
Cut Knife	Cut Knife No. 439	547	573	517	532	−2.8	1.99	259.3
Dalmeny	Corman Park No. 344	1,766	1,826	1,702	1,560	9.1	2.27	751
Davidson	Arm River No. 252	1,044	1,048	1,025	958	7	4.49	228.4
Delisle	Vanscoy No. 345	1,024	1,038	975	898	8.6	2.49	391.3
Duck Lake	Duck Lake No. 463	579	569	577	605	−4.6	2.73	211.6
Dundurn	Dundurn No. 314	675	611	693	647	7.1	1.37	505.3
Eastend	White Valley No. 49	607	503	527	471	11.9	2.71	194.7
Eatonia	Chesterfield No. 261	498	524	508	449	13.1	1.68	301.6
Elrose	Monet No. 257	470	496	477	453	5.3	2.76	172.8
Esterhazy	Fertile Belt No. 183	2,345	2,502	2,472	2,336	5.8	4.75	520.9
Eston	Snipe Lake No. 259	972	1061	1,031	971	6.2	2.72	379.3
Fleming	Moosomin No. 121	70	84	83	75	10.7	2.17	38.3
Foam Lake	Foam Lake No. 276	1,183	1,141	1,148	1,123	2.2	6.06	189.4
Fort Qu'Appelle	North Qu'Appelle No. 187	1,972	2,042	2,034	1,919	6	5.28	385
Francis	Francis No. 127	182	217	176	148	18.9	0.59	297.4
Govan	Last Mountain Valley No. 250	200	194	216	232	−6.9	1.35	159.7
Grand Coulee	Sherwood No. 159	606	649	571	435	31.3	0.33	1,707.5
Gravelbourg	Gravelbourg No. 104	986	1,083	1,116	1,089	2.5	3.23	346
Grenfell	Elcapo No. 154	1,059	1.099	1,049	947	10.8	3.17	331.2
Gull Lake	Gull Lake No. 139	908	1,046	989	965	2.5	2.5	395.6
Hafford	Redberry No. 435	414	407	397	360	10.3	0.8	496.8
Hague	Rosthern No. 403	889	874	878	707	24.2	1.08	815.5
Hanley	Rosedale No. 283	540	511	522	464	12.5	2.65	196.8
Hepburn	Laird No. 404	784	688	562	530	6	1.02	548.4
Herbert	Morse No. 165	770	856	759	742	2.3	3.78	200.7
Hudson Bay	Hudson Bay No. 394	1,403	1,436	1,900	1,646	−8.6	17.35	86.7
Imperial	Big Arm No. 251	372	360	349	321	8.7	1.23	283.5
Indian Head	Indian Head No. 156	1,902	1,910	1,815	1,634	11.1	3.17	572.1
Ituna	Ituna Bon Accord No. 246	726	701	711	622	14.3	1.56	455.5
Kamsack	Cote No. 271	1,779	1,898	1,825	1,713	6.5	5.85	311.8
Kelvington	Kelvington No. 366	827	834	890	866	2.8	3.89	228.8
Kerrobert	Progress No. 351	970	1,026	1,061	1,001	6	7.49	141.7
Kindersley	Kindersley No. 290	4,567	4,597	4,678	4,412	6	12.55	372.8
Kinistino	Kinistino No. 459	671	654	743	643	15.6	0.98	758.8
Kipling	Kingsley No. 124	1,076	1,074	1,051	973	8	2.15	487.9
Kyle	Lacadena No. 228	413	449	437	423	3.3	1.14	383.1
Lafleche	Wood River No. 74	373	382	406	370	9.7	1.51	269.7
Lampman	Browning No. 34	676	675	713	634	12.5	2.23	319.9
Langenburg	Langenburg No. 181	1,228	1,165	1,148	1,048	9.5	3.46	332.2
Langham	Corman Park No. 344	1,518	1,496	1,290	1,120	15.2	3.98	324.4
Lanigan	Usborne No. 310	1,433	1,377	1,390	1,233	12.7	8.34	166.8
Lashburn	Wilton No. 472	870	983	967	914	5.8	3.11	310.5
Leader	Happyland No. 231	881	863	821	881	−6.8	1.71	481.2
Lemberg	Abernethy No. 186	266	313	274	255	7.5	2.67	102.7
Leroy	Leroy No. 339	510	450	427	412	3.6	1.06	402.1
Lumsden	Lumsden No. 189	1,800	1,824	1,631	1,523	7.1	4.06	402
Luseland	Progress No. 351	559	623	566	571	−0.9	1.53	369.6
Macklin	Eye Hill No. 382	1,247	1,374	1,415	1,290	9.7	3.14	450.7
Maidstone	Eldon No. 471	1,209	1,185	1,156	1,037	11.5	4.56	253.5
Maple Creek	Maple Creek No. 111	2,176	2,084	2,176	2,198	−1	4.42	492.1
Marshall	Wilton No. 472	522	591	594	608	−2.3	1.01	588.1
Midale	Cymri No. 36	510	604	562	462	21.6	1.53	368.5
Milestone	Brock No. 64	682	699	618	562	10	2.17	284.4
Moosomin	Moosomin No. 121	2,657	2,743	2,485	2,262	9.9	7.59	327.5
Morse	Morse No. 165	216	242	240	236	1.7	1.45	165.7
Mossbank	Lake Johnston No. 102	368	360	327	330	−0.9	1.75	186.8
Naicam	Pleasantdale No. 398	651	661	686	690	−0.6	1.69	405.5
Nipawin	Nipawin No. 487	4,570	4,401	4,265	4,076	4.6	8.71	489.4
Nokomis	Wreford No. 280	414	404	397	404	−1.7	2.61	152.3
Norquay	Clayton No. 333	240	434	435	412	5.6	1.69	258
Ogema	Key West No. 70	383	403	368	304	21.1	1.43	257.6
Osler	Corman Park No. 344	1,251	1,237	1,088	926	17.5	1.55	700.6
Outlook	Rudy No. 284	2,336	2,279	2,204	1,938	13.7	7.83	281.3
Oxbow	Enniskillen No. 3	1,286	1,328	1,285	1,139	12.8	3.13	410
Pense	Pense No. 160	603	587	532	507	4.9	1.32	402.6
Pilot Butte	Edenwold No. 158	2,638	2,137	1,848	1,872	−1.3	5.05	365.6
Ponteix	Auvergne No. 76	577	563	605	531	13.9	1.09	556
Porcupine Plain	Porcupine No. 395	817	862	855	783	9.2	2.27	377.2
Preeceville	Preeceville No. 334	1,062	1,125	1,070	1,050	1.9	3.06	350.2
Qu'Appelle	South Qu'Appelle No. 157	625	639	668	624	7.1	4.22	158.1
Radisson	Great Bend No. 405	416	514	505	421	20	2.07	243.6
Radville	Laurier No. 38	778	804	860	793	8.4	2.16	398.6
Raymore	Moose Range No. 486	507	575	568	581	−2.2	2.75	206.8
Redvers	Antler No. 61	1,008	1,042	975	878	11	2.96	329
Regina Beach	Lumsden No. 189	1,292	1,145	1,081	1,210	−10.7	3.88	278.5
Rocanville	Rocanville No. 151	889	863	857	869	−1.4	2.43	352.3
Rockglen	Poplar Valley No. 12	399	441	400	366	9.3	2.85	140.4
Rose Valley	Ponass Lake No. 367	256	282	296	338	−12.4	1.12	263.4
Rosetown	St. Andrews No. 287	2,507	2,451	2,317	2,277	1.8	12.14	190.8
Rosthern	Rosthern No. 403	1,602	1,688	1,572	1,382	13.7	4.31	365
Rouleau	Redburn No. 130	505	540	453	400	13.3	1.61	282.2
Saltcoats	Saltcoats No. 213	473	484	474	467	1.5	1.35	352.2
Scott	Tramping Lake No. 380	74	73	75	91	−17.6	4.39	17.1
Shaunavon	Grassy Creek No. 78	1,784	1,714	1,756	1,691	3.8	5.1	344.2
Shellbrook	Shellbrook No. 493	1,510	1,444	1,433	1,230	16.5	3.67	390.3
Sintaluta	Indian Head No. 156	124	119	120	98	22.4	2.7	44.5
Southey	Cupar No. 218	832	804	778	711	9.4	1.56	499.8
Spiritwood	Spiritwood No. 496	966	913	916	911	0.5	2.95	310
Springside	Orkney No. 244	478	502	534	513	4.1	0.68	791
St. Brieux	Lake Lenore No. 399	638	667	590	492	19.9	2.55	231.4
St. Walburg	Frenchman Butte No. 501	591	689	716	672	6.5	2.12	338
Star City	Star City No. 428	374	387	460	428	7.5	0.7	661.1
Stoughton	Tecumseh No. 65	652	649	694	653	6.3	3.41	203.2
Strasbourg	McKillop No. 220	788	800	752	732	2.7	5.7	132
Sturgis	Preeceville No. 334	646	644	620	575	7.8	3.41	181.6
Tisdale	Tisdale No. 427	2,962	3,235	3,180	3,000	6	6.47	491.5
Turtleford	Mervin No. 499	503	496	525	461	13.9	1.69	311.6
Unity	Round Valley No. 410	2,496	2,573	2,389	2,147	11.3	9.77	244.6
Vonda	Grant No. 372	384	384	353	322	9.6	2.86	123.6
Wadena	Lakeview No. 337	1,269	1,288	1,306	1,315	−0.7	2.91	449.5
Wakaw	Fish Creek No. 402	978	922	985	864	14	3.12	315.9
Waldheim	Laird No. 404	1,237	1,213	1,035	868	19.2	1.97	525.5
Wapella	Martin No. 122	278	326	333	311	7.1	2.57	129.8
Watrous	Morris No. 312	1,842	1,900	1,857	1,743	6.5	11.17	166.2
Watson	Lakeside No. 338	707	697	777	719	8.1	2.83	274.7
Wawota	Wawken No. 93	555	543	560	522	7.3	1.24	451
White City	Edenwold No. 158	3,702	3,099	1,894	1,113	70.2	6	315.6
Whitewood	Willowdale No. 153	944	862	950	869	9.3	3.04	312
Wilkie	Tramping Lake No. 380	1,195	1,219	1,301	1,222	6.5	9.48	137.3
Willow Bunch	Willow Bunch No. 42	299	272	286	297	−3.7	0.84	339.2
Wolseley	Wolseley No. 155	852	854	864	782	10.5	5.93	145.6
Wynyard	Big Quill No. 308	1,724	1,798	1,767	1,744	1.3	5.29	334.1
Yellow Grass	Scott No. 98	483	478	440	371	18.6	2.68	164.1
Zealandia	St. Andrews No. 287	75	80	80	90	−11.1	1.38	57.9
Total towns				137,725	127,795	7.8	473.50	290.9

==== Villages ====
The people of an organized hamlet may request that the hamlet be incorporated as a village or resort village. In order to qualify, the hamlet must have been an organized hamlet for at least 3 years, have a population of at least 100 in the most recent census, and contain at least 50 separate dwelling units or business premises.

Saskatchewan has 260 villages.

Villages of Saskatchewan
Name	Incorporation date	Rural municipality	Population (2016)	Population (2011)	Change (%)	Land area (km^{2})	Population density (per km^{2})
Abbey	September 2, 1913	Miry Creek No. 229	142	115	+23.5%	0.77	184.4/km^{2}
Abernethy	July 26, 1904	Abernethy No. 186	204	196	+4.1%	1.03	198.1/km^{2}
Albertville	January 1, 1986	Wise Creek No. 77	86	140	−38.6%	1.12	76.8/km^{2}
Alida	February 19, 1926	Reciprocity No. 32	120	131	−8.4%	0.37	324.3/km^{2}
Alvena	July 1, 1936	Fish Creek No. 402	60	55	+9.1%	0.43	139.5/km^{2}
Annaheim	April 1, 1977	St. Peter No. 369	210	219	−4.1%	0.78	269.2/km^{2}
Archerwill	January 1, 1947	Barrier Valley No. 397	166	200	−17.0%	0.83	200.0/km^{2}
Arran	September 21, 1916	Livingston No. 331	25	40	−37.5%	0.69	36.2/km^{2}
Atwater	August 12, 1910	Fertile Belt No. 183	30	31	−3.2%	1.79	16.8/km^{2}
Avonlea	February 10, 1912	Elmsthorpe No. 100	393	398	−1.3%	0.96	409.4/km^{2}
Aylesbury	March 31, 1910	Craik No. 222	40	42	−4.8%	1.28	31.3/km^{2}
Aylsham	August 4, 1947	Nipawin No. 487	65	71	−8.5%	0.48	135.4/km^{2}
Bangor	June 8, 1911	Fertile Belt No. 183	38	46	−17.4%	1.65	23.0/km^{2}
Beatty	March 31, 1921	Flett's Springs No. 429	60	63	−4.8%	0.82	73.2/km^{2}
Beechy	May 11, 1925	Victory No. 226	228	239	−4.6%	1.06	215.1/km^{2}
Belle Plaine	August 12, 1910	Pense No. 160	85	66	+28.8%	1.34	63.4/km^{2}
Bethune	August 2, 1912	Dufferin No. 190	399	405	−1.5%	2.38	167.6/km^{2}
Bjorkdale	April 1, 1968	Bjorkdale No. 426	201	199	+1.0%	1.39	144.6/km^{2}
Bladworth	July 27, 1906	McCraney No. 282	65	60	+8.3%	0.84	77.4/km^{2}
Borden	July 19, 1907	Great Bend No. 405	287	245	+17.1%	0.76	377.6/km^{2}
Bracken	January 4, 1926	Lone Tree No. 18	20	30	−33.3%	0.6	33.3/km^{2}
Bradwell	December 26, 1912	Blucher No. 343	166	230	−27.8%	0.42	395.2/km^{2}
Briercrest	April 17, 1912	Redburn No. 130	159	111	+43.2%	0.62	256.5/km^{2}
Brock	July 7, 1910	Kindersley No. 290	142	127	+11.8%	0.74	191.9/km^{2}
Broderick	September 13, 1909	Rudy No. 284	85	71	+19.7%	0.91	93.4/km^{2}
Brownlee	December 29, 1908	Eyebrow No. 193	55	50	+10.0%	2.42	22.7/km^{2}
Buchanan	June 11, 1907	Buchanan No. 304	218	225	−3.1%	1.29	169.0/km^{2}
Buena Vista	November 18, 1983	Lumsden No. 189	612	524	+16.8%	3.61	169.5/km^{2}
Bulyea	March 9, 1909	McKillop No. 220	113	102	+10.8%	1.28	88.3/km^{2}
Cadillac	July 2, 1914	Wise Creek No. 77	92	78	+17.9%	1.05	87.6/km^{2}
Calder	January 18, 1911	Calder No. 241	90	97	−7.2%	0.75	120.0/km^{2}
Canwood	July 18, 1916	Canwood No. 494	332	348	−4.6%	2.56	129.7/km^{2}
Carievale	March 14, 1903	Argyle No. 1	240	236	+1.7%	0.88	272.7/km^{2}
Caronport	January 1, 1988	Caron No. 162	994	1,068	−6.9%	1.9	523.2/km^{2}
Ceylon	September 26, 1911	The Gap No. 39	111	99	+12.1%	0.75	148.0/km^{2}
Chamberlain	January 31, 1911	Sarnia No. 221	90	88	+2.3%	0.7	128.6/km^{2}
Chaplin	October 8, 1912	Chaplin No. 164	229	218	+5.0%	1.26	181.7/km^{2}
Christopher Lake	March 1, 1985	Lakeland No. 521	289	281	+2.8%	4.56	63.4/km^{2}
Clavet	July 1, 1978	Blucher No. 343	410	386	+6.2%	0.84	488.1/km^{2}
Climax	December 11, 1923	Lone Tree No. 18	195	182	+7.1%	1	195.0/km^{2}
Coderre	August 26, 1925	Rodgers No. 133	30	30	0.0%	0.85	35.3/km^{2}
Codette	March 9, 1929	Nipawin No. 487	198	205	−3.4%	0.37	535.1/km^{2}
Coleville	July 1, 1953	Oakdale No. 320	305	311	−1.9%	1.87	163.1/km^{2}
Conquest	October 24, 1911	Fertile Valley No. 285	160	176	−9.1%	1	160.0/km^{2}
Consul	June 12, 1917	Reno No. 51	73	84	−13.1%	0.65	112.3/km^{2}
Craven	April 11, 1905	Longlaketon No. 219	214	234	−8.5%	1.21	176.9/km^{2}
Creelman	April 6, 1906	Fillmore No. 96	113	115	−1.7%	1.14	99.1/km^{2}
Debden	June 7, 1922	Canwood No. 494	337	358	−5.9%	1.39	242.4/km^{2}
Denholm	June 25, 1912	Mayfield No. 406	88	76	+15.8%	0.33	266.7/km^{2}
Denzil	May 3, 1911	Eye Hill No. 382	143	135	+5.9%	0.55	260.0/km^{2}
Dilke	December 30, 1912	Sarnia No. 221	98	77	+27.3%	1.28	76.6/km^{2}
Dinsmore	November 3, 1913	Milden No. 286	289	318	−9.1%	2.59	111.6/km^{2}
Disley	June 24, 1907	Lumsden No. 189	67	75	−10.7%	0.65	103.1/km^{2}
Dodsland	August 23, 1913	Winslow No. 319	215	212	+1.4%	2.93	73.4/km^{2}
Dorintosh	January 1, 1989	Meadow Lake No. 588	134	147	−8.8%	0.88	152.3/km^{2}
Drake	September 19, 1910	Usborne No. 310	197	202	−2.5%	0.72	273.6/km^{2}
Drinkwater	June 7, 1904	Redburn No. 130	70	65	+7.7%	2.64	26.5/km^{2}
Dubuc	May 29, 1905	Grayson No. 184	61	70	−12.9%	0.63	96.8/km^{2}
Duff	May 28, 1920	Stanley No. 215	30	30	0.0%	0.22	136.4/km^{2}
Duval	December 21, 1910	Last Mountain Valley No. 250	83	97	−14.4%	0.75	110.7/km^{2}
Dysart	April 6, 1909	Lipton No. 217	200	218	−8.3%	1.19	168.1/km^{2}
Earl Grey	July 27, 1906	Longlaketon No. 219	246	239	+2.9%	1.31	187.8/km^{2}
Ebenezer	July 1, 1948	Orkney No. 244	185	175	+5.7%	0.62	298.4/km^{2}
Edam	October 12, 1911	Turtle River No. 469	480	444	+8.1%	1.19	403.4/km^{2}
Edenwold	October 3, 1912	Edenwold No. 158	233	238	−2.1%	0.68	342.6/km^{2}
Elbow	April 6, 1909	Loreburn No. 254	337	314	+7.3%	3.92	86.0/km^{2}
Elfros	December 1, 1909	Elfros No. 307	90	96	−6.2%	2.52	35.7/km^{2}
Endeavour	April 29, 1953	Preeceville No. 334	65	94	−30.9%	0.99	65.7/km^{2}
Englefeld	June 13, 1916	St. Peter No. 369	285	247	+15.4%	0.65	438.5/km^{2}
Ernfold	December 4, 1912	Morse No. 165	15	30	−50.0%	1.19	12.6/km^{2}
Eyebrow	January 8, 1909	Eyebrow No. 193	119	139	−14.4%	2.7	44.1/km^{2}
Fairlight	October 5, 1909	Maryfield No. 91	40	40	0.0%	2.71	14.8/km^{2}
Fenwood	June 30, 1909	Stanley No. 215	30	40	−25.0%	1.74	17.2/km^{2}
Fillmore	June 10, 1905	Fillmore No. 96	311	255	+22.0%	1.33	233.8/km^{2}
Findlater	September 27, 1911	Dufferin No. 190	45	50	−10.0%	1.2	37.5/km^{2}
Flaxcombe	June 4, 1913	Kindersley No. 290	124	117	+6.0%	1.49	83.2/km^{2}
Forget	November 21, 1904	Tecumseh No. 65	55	35	+57.1%	1.39	39.6/km^{2}
Fosston	January 1, 1965	Ponass Lake No. 367	45	55	−18.2%	0.59	76.3/km^{2}
Fox Valley	August 30, 1928	Fox Valley No. 171	249	260	−4.2%	0.6	415.0/km^{2}
Frobisher	July 4, 1904	Coalfields No. 4	160	166	−3.6%	1.35	118.5/km^{2}
Frontier	July 10, 1930	Frontier No. 19	372	351	+6.0%	0.93	400.0/km^{2}
Gainsborough	May 25, 1894	Argyle No. 1	254	291	−12.7%	0.87	292.0/km^{2}
Gerald	March 25, 1953	Spy Hill No. 152	136	114	+19.3%	0.8	170.0/km^{2}
Glaslyn	April 16, 1929	Parkdale No. 498	387	397	−2.5%	1.97	196.4/km^{2}
Glen Ewen	March 24, 1904	Enniskillen No. 3	154	144	+6.9%	2.77	55.6/km^{2}
Glenavon	April 13, 1910	Chester No. 125	182	176	+3.4%	1.32	137.9/km^{2}
Glenside	March 30, 1911	Rudy No. 284	76	84	−9.5%	0.77	98.7/km^{2}
Golden Prairie	April 15, 1942	Big Stick No. 141	30	35	−14.3%	0.41	73.2/km^{2}
Goodeve	August 18, 1910	Stanley No. 215	40	45	−11.1%	2.62	15.3/km^{2}
Goodsoil	January 1, 1960	Beaver River No. 622	282	281	+0.4%	1.98	142.4/km^{2}
Goodwater	May 8, 1911	Lomond No. 37	30	25	+20.0%	0.59	50.8/km^{2}
Grayson	April 19, 1906	Grayson No. 184	211	184	+14.7%	1.87	112.8/km^{2}
Halbrite	February 26, 1904	Cymri No. 36	119	108	+10.2%	1.2	99.2/km^{2}
Harris	August 10, 1909	Harris No. 316	193	213	−9.4%	0.72	268.1/km^{2}
Hawarden	July 16, 1909	Loreburn No. 254	52	50	+4.0%	1.24	41.9/km^{2}
Hazenmore	August 20, 1913	Pinto Creek No. 75	70	50	+40.0%	0.73	95.9/km^{2}
Hazlet	January 1, 1963	Pittville No. 169	106	95	+11.6%	0.55	192.7/km^{2}
Heward	November 21, 1904	Tecumseh No. 65	44	40	+10.0%	0.99	44.4/km^{2}
Hodgeville	June 22, 1921	Lawtonia No. 135	172	172	0.0%	1.35	127.4/km^{2}
Holdfast	October 5, 1911	Sarnia No. 221	247	169	+46.2%	1.29	191.5/km^{2}
Hubbard	June 11, 1910	Ituna Bon Accord No. 246	35	46	−23.9%	1.25	28.0/km^{2}
Hyas	May 23, 1919	Clayton No. 333	70	114	−38.6%	1.17	59.8/km^{2}
Invermay	September 1, 1908	Invermay No. 305	273	247	+10.5%	1.22	223.8/km^{2}
Jansen	October 19, 1908	Wolverine No. 340	96	126	−23.8%	0.85	112.9/km^{2}
Keeler	July 5, 1910	Marquis No. 191	15	15	0.0%	1.02	14.7/km^{2}
Kelliher	April 27, 1909	Kellross No. 247	217	216	+0.5%	2.81	77.2/km^{2}
Kenaston	July 18, 1910	McCraney No. 282	282	285	−1.1%	1.17	241.0/km^{2}
Kendal	February 17, 1919	Montmartre No. 126	83	77	+7.8%	0.65	127.7/km^{2}
Kennedy	November 5, 1907	Wawken No. 93	216	241	−10.4%	1.56	138.5/km^{2}
Kenosee Lake	October 1, 1987	Wawken No. 93	234	258	−9.3%	0.35	668.6/km^{2}
Killaly	April 28, 1909	McLeod No. 185	65	74	−12.2%	2.59	25.1/km^{2}
Kincaid	July 19, 1913	Pinto Creek No. 75	111	114	−2.6%	0.82	135.4/km^{2}
Kinley	January 7, 1909	Perdue No. 346	60	45	+33.3%	1.18	50.8/km^{2}
Kisbey	May 8, 1907	Brock No. 64	153	217	−29.5%	2.77	55.2/km^{2}
Krydor	August 25, 1914	Redberry No. 435	15	15	0.0%	0.82	18.3/km^{2}
Laird	May 4, 1911	Rosthern No. 403	267	287	−7.0%	1.29	207.0/km^{2}
Lake Lenore	April 28, 1921	Lake Lenore No. 399	284	297	−4.4%	0.97	292.8/km^{2}
Lancer	September 11, 1913	Miry Creek No. 229	69	61	+13.1%	1.33	51.9/km^{2}
Landis	May 17, 1909	Reford No. 379	152	139	+9.4%	0.8	190.0/km^{2}
Lang	July 27, 1906	Scott No. 98	189	200	−5.5%	0.64	295.3/km^{2}
Leask	September 3, 1912	Leask No. 464	399	413	−3.4%	0.75	532.0/km^{2}
Lebret	October 14, 1912	North Qu'Appelle No. 187	216	199	+8.5%	1.31	164.9/km^{2}
Leoville	June 26, 1944	Spiritwood No. 496	375	366	+2.5%	1.11	337.8/km^{2}
Leross	December 1, 1909	Kellross No. 247	46	37	+24.3%	1.21	38.0/km^{2}
Liberty	January 23, 1912	Big Arm No. 251	78	88	−11.4%	1.37	56.9/km^{2}
Limerick	July 10, 1913	Stonehenge No. 73	115	115	0.0%	0.79	145.6/km^{2}
Lintlaw	December 14, 1921	Hazel Dell No. 335	172	162	+6.2%	1.23	139.8/km^{2}
Lipton	May 15, 1905	Lipton No. 217	345	372	−7.3%	0.75	460.0/km^{2}
Loon Lake	January 1, 1950	Loon Lake No. 561	288	314	−8.3%	0.66	436.4/km^{2}
Loreburn	May 20, 1909	Loreburn No. 254	107	107	0.0%	0.62	172.6/km^{2}
Love	June 2, 1945	Torch River No. 488	50	65	−23.1%	0.46	108.7/km^{2}
Lucky Lake	November 23, 1920	Canaan No. 225	289	287	+0.7%	0.66	437.9/km^{2}
MacNutt	February 22, 1913	Churchbridge No. 211	65	65	0.0%	0.81	80.2/km^{2}
Macoun	October 16, 1903	Cymri No. 36	269	246	+9.3%	1.68	160.1/km^{2}
Macrorie	February 8, 1912	Fertile Valley No. 285	68	65	+4.6%	0.77	88.3/km^{2}
Major	September 29, 1914	Prairiedale No. 321	35	61	−42.6%	2.78	12.6/km^{2}
Makwa	June 1, 1965	Loon Lake No. 561	84	97	−13.4%	0.66	127.3/km^{2}
Mankota	February 3, 1941	Mankota No. 45	205	211	−2.8%	1.42	144.4/km^{2}
Manor	April 15, 1902	Moose Mountain No. 63	295	322	−8.4%	2.79	105.7/km^{2}
Marcelin	September 25, 1911	Blaine Lake No. 434	153	158	−3.2%	1.32	115.9/km^{2}
Marengo	November 5, 1910	Milton No. 292	67	47	+42.6%	0.87	77.0/km^{2}
Margo	April 24, 1911	Sasman No. 336	83	100	−17.0%	0.8	103.8/km^{2}
Markinch	February 16, 1911	Cupar No. 218	58	72	−19.4%	0.68	85.3/km^{2}
Marquis	March 21, 1910	Marquis No. 191	97	92	+5.4%	0.63	154.0/km^{2}
Marsden	April 24, 1931	Manitou Lake No. 442	297	284	+4.6%	0.94	316.0/km^{2}
Maryfield	August 21, 1907	Maryfield No. 91	348	365	−4.7%	2.69	129.4/km^{2}
Maymont	June 24, 1907	Mayfield No. 406	138	146	−5.5%	0.66	209.1/km^{2}
McLean	September 1, 1966	South Qu'Appelle No. 157	405	304	+33.2%	1.33	304.5/km^{2}
McTaggart	October 5, 1909	Weyburn No. 67	121	125	−3.2%	0.69	175.4/km^{2}
Meacham	June 19, 1912	Colonsay No. 342	99	84	+17.9%	1.27	78.0/km^{2}
Meath Park	May 23, 1938	Garden River No. 490	175	205	−14.6%	0.77	227.3/km^{2}
Medstead	April 23, 1931	Medstead No. 497	130	120	+8.3%	0.67	194.0/km^{2}
Mendham	April 1, 1930	Happyland No. 231	30	35	−14.3%	0.5	60.0/km^{2}
Meota	July 6, 1911	Meota No. 468	304	307	−1.0%	1.55	196.1/km^{2}
Mervin	March 17, 1920	Mervin No. 499	159	160	−0.6%	0.73	217.8/km^{2}
Middle Lake	January 1, 1963	Three Lakes No. 400	241	242	−0.4%	1.26	191.3/km^{2}
Milden	July 20, 1911	Milden No. 286	167	181	−7.7%	1.19	140.3/km^{2}
Minton	January 1, 1951	Surprise Valley No. 9	55	60	−8.3%	0.3	183.3/km^{2}
Mistatim	July 1, 1952	Bjorkdale No. 426	101	73	+38.4%	0.47	214.9/km^{2}
Montmartre	October 19, 1908	Montmartre No. 126	490	476	+2.9%	1.7	288.2/km^{2}
Mortlach	January 1, 1949	Wheatlands No. 163	261	289	−9.7%	2.76	94.6/km^{2}
Muenster	August 18, 1908	St. Peter No. 369	430	422	+1.9%	1.33	323.3/km^{2}
Neilburg	January 1, 1947	Hillsdale No. 440	379	448	−15.4%	1.22	310.7/km^{2}
Netherhill	April 28, 1910	Kindersley No. 290	25	25	0.0%	0.73	34.2/km^{2}
Neudorf	April 25, 1905	McLeod No. 185	263	272	−3.3%	2.05	128.3/km^{2}
Neville	July 5, 1912	Whiska Creek No. 106	87	83	+4.8%	1.1	79.1/km^{2}
North Portal	November 16, 1903	Coalfields No. 4	115	143	−19.6%	2.49	46.2/km^{2}
Odessa	March 14, 1911	Francis No. 127	205	239	−14.2%	1.18	173.7/km^{2}
Osage	May 8, 1906	Fillmore No. 96	20	20	0.0%	0.59	33.9/km^{2}
Paddockwood	January 1, 1949	Paddockwood No. 520	154	163	−5.5%	0.65	236.9/km^{2}
Pangman	May 17, 1911	Norton No. 69	232	214	+8.4%	0.73	317.8/km^{2}
Paradise Hill	January 1, 1947	Frenchman Butte No. 501	491	515	−4.7%	2.56	191.8/km^{2}
Parkside	February 21, 1913	Leask No. 464	121	125	−3.2%	0.92	131.5/km^{2}
Paynton	May 2, 1907	Paynton No. 470	148	151	−2.0%	0.85	174.1/km^{2}
Pelly	May 4, 1911	St. Philips No. 301	285	283	+0.7%	0.96	296.9/km^{2}
Pennant	July 29, 1912	Riverside No. 168	130	120	+8.3%	0.65	200.0/km^{2}
Perdue	July 15, 1909	Perdue No. 346	334	362	−7.7%	1.1	303.6/km^{2}
Pierceland	January 1, 1973	Beaver River No. 622	598	551	+8.5%	2.69	222.3/km^{2}
Pilger	January 1, 1969	Three Lakes No. 400	65	65	0.0%	0.52	125.0/km^{2}
Pleasantdale	January 1, 1987	Pleasantdale No. 398	76	76	0.0%	0.56	135.7/km^{2}
Plenty	March 25, 1911	Winslow No. 319	164	131	+25.2%	0.65	252.3/km^{2}
Plunkett	December 28, 1921	Viscount No. 341	60	75	−20.0%	0.64	93.8/km^{2}
Prud'homme	November 15, 1922	Bayne No. 371	167	172	−2.9%	0.84	198.8/km^{2}
Punnichy	October 22, 1909	Mount Hope No. 279	213	246	−13.4%	0.68	313.2/km^{2}
Quill Lake	December 8, 1906	Lakeside No. 338	387	409	−5.4%	1.3	297.7/km^{2}
Quinton	March 1, 1910	Mount Hope No. 279	101	111	−9.0%	0.96	105.2/km^{2}
Rama	December 18, 1919	Invermay No. 305	80	75	+6.7%	0.67	119.4/km^{2}
Rhein	March 10, 1913	Wallace No. 243	170	158	+7.6%	1.09	156.0/km^{2}
Richard	October 11, 1916	Douglas No. 436	20	30	−33.3%	0.73	27.4/km^{2}
Richmound	May 5, 1947	Enterprise No. 142	147	154	−4.5%	0.47	312.8/km^{2}
Ridgedale	December 15, 1921	Connaught No. 457	55	80	−31.2%	0.72	76.4/km^{2}
Riverhurst	June 22, 1916	Maple Bush No. 224	130	114	+14.0%	0.91	142.9/km^{2}
Roche Percee	January 12, 1909	Coalfields No. 4	110	153	−28.1%	2.83	38.9/km^{2}
Ruddell	March 18, 1914	Mayfield No. 406	20	20	0.0%	0.47	42.6/km^{2}
Rush Lake	October 16, 1911	Excelsior No. 166	53	65	−18.5%	0.74	71.6/km^{2}
Sceptre	April 30, 1913	Clinworth No. 230	94	97	−3.1%	1.23	76.4/km^{2}
Sedley	August 3, 1907	Francis No. 127	358	337	+6.2%	1.33	269.2/km^{2}
Semans	December 14, 1908	Mount Hope No. 279	196	204	−3.9%	1.14	171.9/km^{2}
Senlac	October 11, 1916	Senlac No. 411	41	46	−10.9%	0.6	68.3/km^{2}
Shamrock	January 1, 1960	Shamrock No. 134	20	20	0.0%	0.79	25.3/km^{2}
Sheho	June 30, 1905	Insinger No. 275	105	130	−19.2%	1.95	53.8/km^{2}
Shell Lake	October 18, 1940	Spiritwood No. 496	175	152	+15.1%	1.23	142.3/km^{2}
Silton	July 2, 1914	McKillop No. 220	71	95	−25.3%	1.07	66.4/km^{2}
Simpson	July 11, 1911	Wood Creek No. 281	127	131	−3.1%	1.41	90.1/km^{2}
Smeaton	March 7, 1944	Torch River No. 488	182	181	+0.6%	1.48	123.0/km^{2}
Smiley	November 26, 1913	Prairiedale No. 321	60	60	0.0%	0.64	93.8/km^{2}
Spalding	March 11, 1924	Spalding No. 368	244	242	+0.8%	1.18	206.8/km^{2}
Speers	December 24, 1915	Douglas No. 436	60	65	−7.7%	0.69	87.0/km^{2}
Spy Hill	April 22, 1910	Spy Hill No. 152	168	204	−17.6%	1.19	141.2/km^{2}
St. Benedict	January 1, 1964	Three Lakes No. 400	84	82	+2.4%	0.54	155.6/km^{2}
St. Gregor	March 26, 1920	St. Peter No. 369	97	98	−1.0%	0.91	106.6/km^{2}
St. Louis	May 19, 1959	St. Louis No. 431	415	449	−7.6%	1.08	384.3/km^{2}
Stenen	August 14, 1912	Clayton No. 333	90	79	+13.9%	0.7	128.6/km^{2}
Stewart Valley	January 1, 1958	Saskatchewan Landing No. 167	91	76	+19.7%	0.86	105.8/km^{2}
Stockholm	June 30, 1905	Fertile Belt No. 183	352	341	+3.2%	1.65	213.3/km^{2}
Storthoaks	June 5, 1940	Storthoaks No. 31	108	93	+16.1%	0.49	220.4/km^{2}
Strongfield	May 3, 1912	Loreburn No. 254	40	40	0.0%	0.8	50.0/km^{2}
Success	October 25, 1912	Riverside No. 168	45	40	+12.5%	1.38	32.6/km^{2}
Tantallon	June 17, 1904	Spy Hill No. 152	91	105	−13.3%	0.84	108.3/km^{2}
Tessier	August 24, 1909	Harris No. 316	25	25	0.0%	1	25.0/km^{2}
Theodore	July 5, 1907	Insinger No. 275	323	345	−6.4%	1.73	186.7/km^{2}
Togo	September 4, 1906	Cote No. 271	86	87	−1.1%	1.5	57.3/km^{2}
Tompkins	June 2, 1910	Gull Lake No. 139	152	170	−10.6%	2.65	57.4/km^{2}
Torquay	December 11, 1923	Cambria No. 6	255	236	+8.1%	1.35	188.9/km^{2}
Tramping Lake	April 10, 1917	Tramping Lake No. 380	60	55	+9.1%	1.39	43.2/km^{2}
Tugaske	May 7, 1909	Huron No. 223	75	92	−18.5%	0.76	98.7/km^{2}
Tuxford	July 19, 1907	Marquis No. 191	113	91	+24.2%	0.62	182.3/km^{2}
Val Marie	September 13, 1926	Val Marie No. 17	126	130	−3.1%	0.42	300.0/km^{2}
Valparaiso	July 18, 1924	Star City No. 428	15	15	0.0%	0.69	21.7/km^{2}
Vanguard	July 8, 1912	Whiska Creek No. 106	134	152	−11.8%	1.86	72.0/km^{2}
Vanscoy	June 17, 1919	Vanscoy No. 345	462	377	+22.5%	1.49	310.1/km^{2}
Vibank	June 23, 1911	Francis No. 127	385	374	+2.9%	0.73	527.4/km^{2}
Viscount	December 17, 1908	Viscount No. 341	232	252	−7.9%	1.18	196.6/km^{2}
Waldeck	December 23, 1913	Excelsior No. 166	277	297	−6.7%	2	138.5/km^{2}
Waldron	July 17, 1909	Grayson No. 184	15	20	−25.0%	1.45	10.3/km^{2}
Waseca	March 15, 1911	Eldon No. 471	149	154	−3.2%	0.68	219.1/km^{2}
Webb	June 18, 1910	Webb No. 138	50	58	−13.8%	1.41	35.5/km^{2}
Weekes	January 13, 1947	Porcupine No. 395	40	42	−4.8%	0.59	67.8/km^{2}
Weirdale	April 1, 1948	Garden River No. 490	50	75	−33.3%	1.36	36.8/km^{2}
Weldon	January 24, 1914	Kinistino No. 459	197	196	+0.5%	1.1	179.1/km^{2}
White Fox	July 21, 1941	Torch River No. 488	355	364	−2.5%	0.85	417.6/km^{2}
Wilcox	April 20, 1907	Bratt's Lake No. 129	264	339	−22.1%	1.48	178.4/km^{2}
Windthorst	August 21, 1907	Chester No. 125	211	215	−1.9%	1.43	147.6/km^{2}
Wiseton	September 23, 1913	Milden No. 286	79	88	−10.2%	0.77	102.6/km^{2}
Wood Mountain	March 4, 1930	Old Post No. 43	20	25	−20.0%	0.61	32.8/km^{2}
Yarbo	July 1, 1964	Langenburg No. 181	57	53	+7.5%	0.83	68.7/km^{2}
Young	June 7, 1910	Morris No. 312	244	239	+2.1%	2.51	97.2/km^{2}
Zelma	August 10, 1910	Morris No. 312	35	35	0.0%	0.72	48.6/km^{2}
Zenon Park	July 28, 1941	Arborfield No. 456	194	187	+3.7%	0.56	346.4/km^{2}
Total villages			41,514	41,945	−1.0%	295.11	140.67/km^{2}

==== Resort villages ====
Saskatchewan has 40 resort villages.

Resort villages of Saskatchewan
Name	Rural municipality (RM)	Population (2011)	Population (2006)	Change (%)	Land area (km^{2})	Population density (per km^{2})
Alice Beach	Sarnia No. 221	45	68	−33.8	0.71	63.7
Aquadeo	Meota No. 468	84	123	−31.7	0.74	113.3
Beaver Flat	Excelsior No. 166	40	58	−31	0.92	43.6
Big Shell	Spiritwood No. 496	45	45	0	1.02	44.3
Bird's Point	Fertile Belt No. 183	103	88	17	0.58	177.4
B-Say-Tah	North Qu'Appelle No. 187	187	206	−9.2	1.33	140.3
Candle Lake	Paddockwood No. 520	765	792	−3.4	63.32	12.1
Chitek Lake	Big River No. 555	167	219	−23.7	2.54	65.9
Chorney Beach	Foam Lake No. 276	15	36	−58.3	0.17	89.4
Cochin	Meota No. 468	122	208	−41.3	1.35	90.6
Coteau Beach	Coteau No. 255	40	30	33.3	0.54	74.2
Echo Bay	Spiritwood No. 496	38	77	−50.6	0.8	47.7
Etters Beach	Big Arm No. 251	30	15	100	0.12	253.4
Fort San	North Qu'Appelle No. 187	187	215	−13	2.9	64.6
Glen Harbour	McKillop No. 220	65	73	−11	0.35	185.8
Grandview Beach	Sarnia No. 221	25	35	−28.6	0.25	98.6
Greig Lake	Meadow Lake No. 588	23	20	15	0.14	163.2
Island View	McKillop No. 220	65	88	−26.1	0.43	150.2
Kannata Valley	Longlaketon No. 219	101	133	−24.1	0.63	159.6
Katepwa	Abernethy No. 186	403	285	41.4	5.78	69.7
Kivimaa-Moonlight Bay	Mervin No. 499	84	126	−33.3	0.55	154
Leslie Beach	Foam Lake No. 276	23	30	−23.3	0.56	41.1
Lumsden Beach	Lumsden No. 189	10	40	−75.0	0.47	21.3
Manitou Beach	Morris No. 312	257	233	10.3	3.09	83.1
Melville Beach	Grayson No. 184	27	41	−34.1	0.21	128.6
Metinota	Meota No. 468	89	89	0	0.52	170
Mistusinne	Maple Bush No. 224	66	56	17.9	1.49	44.3
North Grove	Dufferin No. 190	49	68	−27.9	1.03	47.8
Pebble Baye	Leask No. 464	33	27	22.2	0.74	44.4
Pelican Pointe	McKillop No. 220	15	23	−34.8	0.12	125.2
Saskatchewan Beach	McKillop No. 220	213	155	37.4	1.57	135.5
Shields	Dundurn No. 314	220	172	27.9	0.72	304.5
South Lake	Marquis No. 191	48	105	−54.3	1.15	41.9
Sun Valley	Marquis No. 191	80	128	−37.5	2.33	34.3
Sunset Cove	McKillop No. 220	25	26	−3.8	0.17	148.4
Thode	Dundurn No. 314	157	156	0.6	0.73	214.2
Tobin Lake	Moose Range No. 486	90	87	3.4	1.81	49.6
Wakaw Lake	Hoodoo No. 401	30	35	−14.3	0.59	50.9
Wee Too Beach	Sarnia No. 221	35	60	−41.7	0.17	207.8
West End	Fertile Belt No. 183	17	26	−34.6	0.34	50.4
Total resort villages		4,118	4,497	−8.4	102.98	40.0

=== Rural municipalities ===
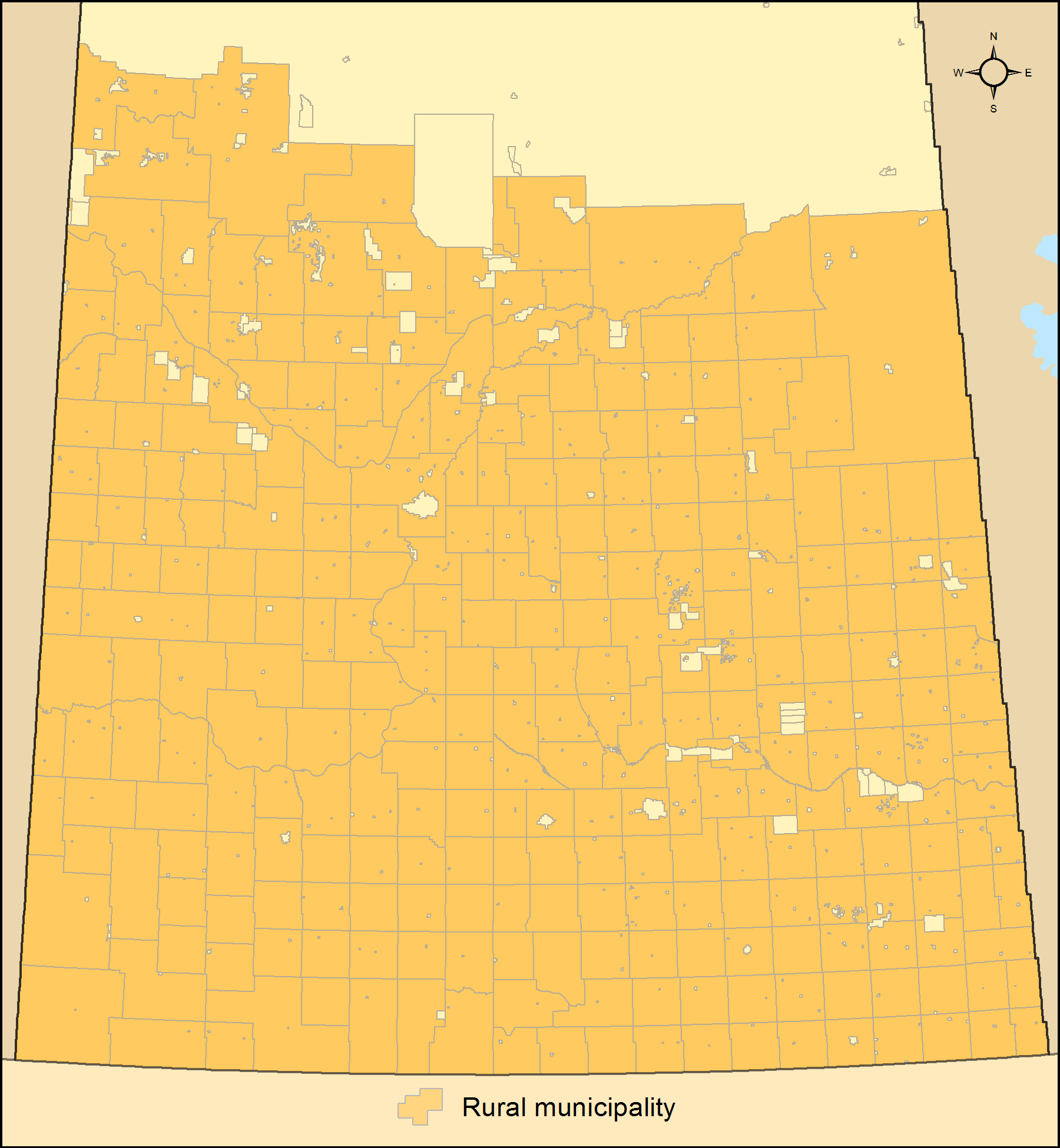
Distribution of Saskatchewan's 296 rural municipalities

A rural municipality is created by the Minister of Municipal Affairs by ministerial order via section 49 of The Municipalities Act. Saskatchewan has 296 rural municipalities, which are located in the central and southern portions of the province.

Saskatchewan has 296 rural municipalities.

Rural municipalities of Saskatchewan
Rural municipality (RM)	Incorporation date	Population (2016)	Population (2011)	Change (%)	Land area (km^{2})	Population density (per km^{2})
Aberdeen No. 373	December 13, 1909	1,379	1,016	+35.7%	673.42	2.0/km^{2}
Abernethy No. 186	December 11, 1911	362	387	−6.5%	779.42	0.5/km^{2}
Antelope Park No. 322	December 11, 1911	130	150	−13.3%	612.9	0.2/km^{2}
Antler No. 61	December 13, 1909	523	577	−9.4%	832.81	0.6/km^{2}
Arborfield No. 456	January 1, 1913	343	453	−24.3%	1,416.01	0.2/km^{2}
Argyle No. 1	December 19, 1912	290	270	+7.4%	579.88	0.5/km^{2}
Arlington No. 79	January 1, 1913	366	345	+6.1%	846.79	0.4/km^{2}
Arm River No. 252	December 13, 1909	250	249	+0.4%	725.3	0.3/km^{2}
Auvergne No. 76	January 1, 1913	412	354	+16.4%	854.46	0.5/km^{2}
Baildon No. 131	December 9, 1912	620	594	+4.4%	846.21	0.7/km^{2}
Barrier Valley No. 397	October 29, 1917	431	498	−13.5%	819.99	0.5/km^{2}
Battle River No. 438	December 12, 1910	1,154	1,099	+5.0%	1,061.4	1.1/km^{2}
Bayne No. 371	December 12, 1910	467	493	−5.3%	802.93	0.6/km^{2}
Beaver River No. 622	January 1, 1978	1,216	1,017	+19.6%	2,370.09	0.5/km^{2}
Bengough No. 40	January 1, 1913	281	329	−14.6%	1,036.91	0.3/km^{2}
Benson No. 35	December 13, 1909	472	490	−3.7%	836.39	0.6/km^{2}
Big Arm No. 251	December 11, 1911	191	200	−4.5%	699.32	0.3/km^{2}
Big Quill No. 308	December 13, 1909	519	587	−11.6%	739.86	0.7/km^{2}
Big River No. 555	October 1, 1977	889	855	+4.0%	2,487.82	0.4/km^{2}
Big Stick No. 141	December 11, 1911	136	148	−8.1%	821.4	0.2/km^{2}
Biggar No. 347	December 11, 1911	798	820	−2.7%	1,598.56	0.5/km^{2}
Birch Hills No. 460	December 11, 1911	656	663	−1.1%	554.07	1.2/km^{2}
Bjorkdale No. 426	January 1, 1913	851	900	−5.4%	1,460.5	0.6/km^{2}
Blaine Lake No. 434	December 9, 1912	291	288	+1.0%	799.69	0.4/km^{2}
Blucher No. 343	December 13, 1909	2,006	1,876	+6.9%	789.64	2.5/km^{2}
Bone Creek No. 108	December 11, 1911	394	340	+15.9%	847.16	0.5/km^{2}
Bratt's Lake No. 129	January 1, 1913	315	350	−10.0%	844.94	0.4/km^{2}
Britannia No. 502	December 13, 1909	2,153	1,734	+24.2%	950.39	2.3/km^{2}
Brock No. 64	December 12, 1910	267	238	+12.2%	797.13	0.3/km^{2}
Brokenshell No. 68	December 13, 1909	312	308	+1.3%	850.01	0.4/km^{2}
Browning No. 34	December 11, 1911	375	399	−6.0%	823.38	0.5/km^{2}
Buchanan No. 304	January 1, 1913	301	406	−25.9%	738.8	0.4/km^{2}
Buckland No. 491	December 11, 1911	3,375	3,658	−7.7%	791.69	4.3/km^{2}
Buffalo No. 409	December 13, 1909	506	506	0.0%	1,222.08	0.4/km^{2}
Calder No. 241	January 1, 1913	370	322	+14.9%	807.27	0.5/km^{2}
Caledonia No. 99	December 13, 1909	245	257	−4.7%	845.68	0.3/km^{2}
Cambria No. 6	December 13, 1909	309	304	+1.6%	814.14	0.4/km^{2}
Cana No. 214	December 13, 1909	867	858	+1.0%	820.9	1.1/km^{2}
Canaan No. 225	January 1, 1913	140	149	−6.0%	549.09	0.3/km^{2}
Canwood No. 494	January 1, 1913	1,381	1,424	−3.0%	1,945.2	0.7/km^{2}
Carmichael No. 109	December 9, 1912	444	440	+0.9%	846.4	0.5/km^{2}
Caron No. 162	December 9, 1912	576	516	+11.6%	569.87	1.0/km^{2}
Chaplin No. 164	January 1, 1913	113	147	−23.1%	802.74	0.1/km^{2}
Chester No. 125	December 13, 1909	383	373	+2.7%	837.08	0.5/km^{2}
Chesterfield No. 261	December 9, 1912	481	480	+0.2%	1,943.29	0.2/km^{2}
Churchbridge No. 211	January 1, 1913	619	673	−8.0%	958.57	0.6/km^{2}
Clayton No. 333	January 1, 1913	592	669	−11.5%	1,401.57	0.4/km^{2}
Clinworth No. 230	December 9, 1912	154	211	−27.0%	1,432.75	0.1/km^{2}
Coalfields No. 4	January 1, 1913	368	382	−3.7%	819.52	0.4/km^{2}
Colonsay No. 342	December 13, 1909	269	240	+12.1%	549.99	0.5/km^{2}
Connaught No. 457	December 11, 1911	586	629	−6.8%	853.11	0.7/km^{2}
Corman Park No. 344	January 1, 1970	8,568	8,277	+3.5%	1,911.35	4.5/km^{2}
Cote No. 271	December 12, 1910	548	580	−5.5%	879.8	0.6/km^{2}
Coteau No. 255	December 12, 1910	475	420	+13.1%	899.27	0.5/km^{2}
Coulee No. 136	December 12, 1910	563	582	−3.3%	843.69	0.7/km^{2}
Craik No. 222	December 9, 1912	259	276	−6.2%	885.41	0.3/km^{2}
Cupar No. 218	December 13, 1909	503	554	−9.2%	912.96	0.6/km^{2}
Cut Knife No. 439	December 13, 1909	364	359	+1.4%	653	0.6/km^{2}
Cymri No. 36	December 13, 1909	549	524	+4.8%	832.32	0.7/km^{2}
Deer Forks No. 232	January 1, 1913	109	223	−51.1%	736.26	0.1/km^{2}
Douglas No. 436	December 13, 1909	350	331	+5.7%	820.37	0.4/km^{2}
Duck Lake No. 463	January 1, 1913	1,004	846	+18.7%	1,046.93	1.0/km^{2}
Dufferin No. 190	December 9, 1912	559	491	+13.8%	957.04	0.6/km^{2}
Dundurn No. 314	December 13, 1909	2,404	1,148	+109.4%	807.94	3.0/km^{2}
Eagle Creek No. 376	December 13, 1909	595	580	+2.6%	833.08	0.7/km^{2}
Edenwold No. 158	December 9, 1912	4,490	4,132	+8.7%	849.04	5.3/km^{2}
Elcapo No. 154	December 12, 1910	488	481	+1.5%	846.04	0.6/km^{2}
Eldon No. 471	December 13, 1909	750	751	−0.1%	1,007.59	0.7/km^{2}
Elfros No. 307	December 13, 1909	391	432	−9.5%	697.34	0.6/km^{2}
Elmsthorpe No. 100	December 12, 1910	226	210	+7.6%	843.12	0.3/km^{2}
Emerald No. 277	December 12, 1910	405	447	−9.4%	854.44	0.5/km^{2}
Enfield No. 194	December 13, 1909	226	270	−16.3%	1,014.1	0.2/km^{2}
Enniskillen No. 3	December 13, 1909	459	452	+1.5%	834.67	0.5/km^{2}
Enterprise No. 142	April 18, 1913	110	140	−21.4%	989.73	0.1/km^{2}
Estevan No. 5	December 12, 1910	1,370	1,139	+20.3%	773.38	1.8/km^{2}
Excel No. 71	January 1, 1913	391	427	−8.4%	1,122.02	0.3/km^{2}
Excelsior No. 166	December 13, 1909	806	959	−16.0%	1,198.35	0.7/km^{2}
Eye Hill No. 382	December 12, 1910	590	614	−3.9%	798.3	0.7/km^{2}
Eyebrow No. 193	December 13, 1909	195	230	−15.2%	835.04	0.2/km^{2}
Fertile Belt No. 183	January 1, 1913	781	785	−0.5%	1,006.67	0.8/km^{2}
Fertile Valley No. 285	December 13, 1909	539	511	+5.5%	1,016.37	0.5/km^{2}
Fillmore No. 96	December 13, 1909	223	255	−12.5%	828.33	0.3/km^{2}
Fish Creek No. 402	January 1, 1913	345	304	+13.5%	597.9	0.6/km^{2}
Flett's Springs No. 429	December 13, 1909	732	751	−2.5%	844.61	0.9/km^{2}
Foam Lake No. 276	December 12, 1910	586	587	−0.2%	1,345.98	0.4/km^{2}
Fox Valley No. 171	October 29, 1913	330	345	−4.3%	1,253.79	0.3/km^{2}
Francis No. 127	December 13, 1909	674	676	−0.3%	1,106.79	0.6/km^{2}
Frenchman Butte No. 501	January 1, 1954	1,494	1,438	+3.9%	1,927.39	0.8/km^{2}
Frontier No. 19	January 1, 1913	326	371	−12.1%	1,675.02	0.2/km^{2}
Garden River No. 490	January 1, 1913	727	641	+13.4%	662.9	1.1/km^{2}
Garry No. 245	January 1, 1913	364	412	−11.7%	853.59	0.4/km^{2}
Glen Bain No. 105	December 11, 1911	180	205	−12.2%	843.4	0.2/km^{2}
Glen McPherson No. 46	January 1, 1913	72	73	−1.4%	848.29	0.1/km^{2}
Glenside No. 377	December 13, 1909	248	267	−7.1%	905.74	0.3/km^{2}
Golden West No. 95	December 13, 1909	291	315	−7.6%	790.72	0.4/km^{2}
Good Lake No. 274	January 1, 1913	747	684	+9.2%	809.94	0.9/km^{2}
Grandview No. 349	December 11, 1911	348	350	−0.6%	715.38	0.5/km^{2}
Grant No. 372	December 13, 1909	466	425	+9.6%	666.16	0.7/km^{2}
Grass Lake No. 381	December 13, 1909	399	369	+8.1%	801.29	0.5/km^{2}
Grassy Creek No. 78	January 1, 1913	364	284	+28.2%	837.4	0.4/km^{2}
Gravelbourg No. 104	December 9, 1912	472	306	+54.2%	841.98	0.6/km^{2}
Grayson No. 184	January 1, 1913	512	478	+7.1%	874.77	0.6/km^{2}
Great Bend No. 405	December 12, 1910	509	499	+2.0%	830.58	0.6/km^{2}
Griffin No. 66	December 13, 1909	438	398	+10.1%	816.59	0.5/km^{2}
Gull Lake No. 139	January 1, 1913	201	201	0.0%	836.41	0.2/km^{2}
Happy Valley No. 10	January 1, 1913	139	148	−6.1%	812.74	0.2/km^{2}
Happyland No. 231	January 1, 1913	249	284	−12.3%	1,259	0.2/km^{2}
Harris No. 316	December 12, 1910	193	224	−13.8%	805.42	0.2/km^{2}
Hart Butte No. 11	January 1, 1913	252	264	−4.5%	841.98	0.3/km^{2}
Hazel Dell No. 335	January 1, 1913	515	511	+0.8%	1,394.02	0.4/km^{2}
Hazelwood No. 94	January 1, 1913	230	246	−6.5%	743.81	0.3/km^{2}
Heart's Hill No. 352	November 15, 1910	244	260	−6.2%	838.37	0.3/km^{2}
Hillsborough No. 132	January 1, 1913	101	114	−11.4%	445.25	0.2/km^{2}
Hillsdale No. 440	January 1, 1913	553	563	−1.8%	1,028.72	0.5/km^{2}
Hoodoo No. 401	January 1, 1913	675	706	−4.4%	810.58	0.8/km^{2}
Hudson Bay No. 394	May 1, 1977	1,114	1,122	−0.7%	12,462.61	0.1/km^{2}
Humboldt No. 370	January 1, 1913	935	885	+5.6%	796.69	1.2/km^{2}
Huron No. 223	December 12, 1910	198	196	+1.0%	842.11	0.2/km^{2}
Indian Head No. 156	August 6, 1884	336	380	−11.6%	759.98	0.4/km^{2}
Insinger No. 275	January 1, 1913	315	325	−3.1%	849.38	0.4/km^{2}
Invergordon No. 430	December 11, 1911	565	651	−13.2%	854.19	0.7/km^{2}
Invermay No. 305	December 11, 1911	325	334	−2.7%	729.44	0.4/km^{2}
Ituna Bon Accord No. 246	January 1, 1913	374	435	−14.0%	837.23	0.4/km^{2}
Kellross No. 247	December 13, 1909	305	362	−15.7%	834.09	0.4/km^{2}
Kelvington No. 366	January 1, 1913	398	494	−19.4%	862.24	0.5/km^{2}
Key West No. 70	December 12, 1910	255	287	−11.1%	825.26	0.3/km^{2}
Keys No. 303	January 1, 1913	390	417	−6.5%	661.61	0.6/km^{2}
Kindersley No. 290	December 12, 1910	1,049	987	+6.3%	2,112.68	0.5/km^{2}
King George No. 256	December 11, 1911	226	217	+4.1%	831.97	0.3/km^{2}
Kingsley No. 124	December 12, 1910	444	421	+5.5%	844.06	0.5/km^{2}
Kinistino No. 459	December 11, 1911	554	613	−9.6%	948.46	0.6/km^{2}
Lac Pelletier No. 107	January 1, 1913	546	607	−10.0%	849.27	0.6/km^{2}
Lacadena No. 228	December 12, 1910	535	572	−6.5%	1,895.97	0.3/km^{2}
Laird No. 404	December 12, 1910	1,387	1,240	+11.9%	729.98	1.9/km^{2}
Lajord No. 128	December 13, 1909	1,232	993	+24.1%	943.87	1.3/km^{2}
Lake Alma No. 8	May 5, 1913	242	250	−3.2%	822.47	0.3/km^{2}
Lake Johnston No. 102	December 9, 1912	170	160	+6.3%	567.24	0.3/km^{2}
Lake Lenore No. 399	January 1, 1913	587	536	+9.5%	723.53	0.8/km^{2}
Lake of the Rivers No. 72	December 11, 1911	279	302	−7.6%	677.5	0.4/km^{2}
Lakeland No. 521	August 1, 1977	915	869	+5.3%	493.44	1.9/km^{2}
Lakeside No. 338	December 12, 1910	415	387	+7.2%	636.8	0.7/km^{2}
Lakeview No. 337	December 13, 1909	368	336	+9.5%	724.89	0.5/km^{2}
Langenburg No. 181	January 1, 1913	557	572	−2.6%	675.42	0.8/km^{2}
Last Mountain Valley No. 250	December 13, 1909	275	267	+3.0%	871.17	0.3/km^{2}
Laurier No. 38	December 13, 1909	296	321	−7.8%	840.4	0.4/km^{2}
Lawtonia No. 135	December 12, 1910	346	434	−20.3%	845.28	0.4/km^{2}
Leask No. 464	December 9, 1912	686	775	−11.5%	1,257.36	0.5/km^{2}
Leroy No. 339	January 1, 1913	502	490	+2.4%	839.29	0.6/km^{2}
Lipton No. 217	December 11, 1911	381	424	−10.1%	813.69	0.5/km^{2}
Livingston No. 331	January 1, 1913	281	311	−9.6%	1,338.85	0.2/km^{2}
Lomond No. 37	December 11, 1911	296	304	−2.6%	833.95	0.4/km^{2}
Lone Tree No. 18	December 8, 1913	150	145	+3.4%	838	0.2/km^{2}
Longlaketon No. 219	December 12, 1910	1,016	962	+5.6%	1,024.59	1.0/km^{2}
Loon Lake No. 561	January 1, 1978	756	725	+4.3%	2,805.1	0.3/km^{2}
Loreburn No. 254	December 12, 1910	327	346	−5.5%	966.78	0.3/km^{2}
Lost River No. 313	December 11, 1911	242	209	+15.8%	549.92	0.4/km^{2}
Lumsden No. 189	December 9, 1912	1,938	1,772	+9.4%	817.13	2.4/km^{2}
Manitou Lake No. 442	December 12, 1910	573	547	+4.8%	850.95	0.7/km^{2}
Mankota No. 45	January 1, 1913	292	322	−9.3%	1,696.35	0.2/km^{2}
Maple Bush No. 224	December 13, 1909	192	167	+15.0%	811.95	0.2/km^{2}
Maple Creek No. 111	December 10, 1917	1,068	1,154	−7.5%	3,243.33	0.3/km^{2}
Mariposa No. 350	December 12, 1910	205	220	−6.8%	636.73	0.3/km^{2}
Marquis No. 191	December 11, 1911	297	212	+40.1%	801.42	0.4/km^{2}
Marriott No. 317	December 12, 1910	366	372	−1.6%	843.29	0.4/km^{2}
Martin No. 122	January 1, 1913	289	333	−13.2%	556.5	0.5/km^{2}
Maryfield No. 91	December 9, 1912	324	319	+1.6%	759.58	0.4/km^{2}
Mayfield No. 406	December 13, 1909	377	389	−3.1%	782.5	0.5/km^{2}
McCraney No. 282	December 13, 1909	310	307	+1.0%	948.55	0.3/km^{2}
McKillop No. 220	December 13, 1909	732	575	+27.3%	668.44	1.1/km^{2}
McLeod No. 185	January 1, 1913	365	446	−18.2%	886.6	0.4/km^{2}
Meadow Lake No. 588	February 1, 1976	2,501	2,667	−6.2%	6,306.17	0.4/km^{2}
Medstead No. 497	January 1, 1913	508	513	−1.0%	1,203.22	0.4/km^{2}
Meeting Lake No. 466	January 1, 1913	319	376	−15.2%	1,066.74	0.3/km^{2}
Meota No. 468	December 13, 1909	933	936	−0.3%	651.06	1.4/km^{2}
Mervin No. 499	January 1, 1913	1,256	1,224	+2.6%	1,594.6	0.8/km^{2}
Milden No. 286	December 12, 1910	327	283	+15.5%	735.29	0.4/km^{2}
Milton No. 292	December 11, 1911	241	312	−22.8%	658.64	0.4/km^{2}
Miry Creek No. 229	January 1, 1913	370	384	−3.6%	1,221.15	0.3/km^{2}
Monet No. 257	December 13, 1909	445	495	−10.1%	1,591.7	0.3/km^{2}
Montmartre No. 126	December 13, 1909	483	488	−1.0%	853.84	0.6/km^{2}
Montrose No. 315	December 13, 1909	712	712	0.0%	898.38	0.8/km^{2}
Moose Creek No. 33	December 12, 1910	379	372	+1.9%	842.03	0.5/km^{2}
Moose Jaw No. 161	December 11, 1911	1,163	1,147	+1.4%	793.73	1.5/km^{2}
Moose Mountain No. 63	December 11, 1911	492	475	+3.6%	738.38	0.7/km^{2}
Moose Range No. 486	December 11, 1916	1,000	1,131	−11.6%	2,418.7	0.4/km^{2}
Moosomin No. 121	January 1, 1913	470	504	−6.7%	562.01	0.8/km^{2}
Morris No. 312	December 13, 1909	290	316	−8.2%	847.16	0.3/km^{2}
Morse No. 165	December 11, 1911	427	401	+6.5%	1,244.38	0.3/km^{2}
Mount Hope No. 279	December 11, 1911	531	567	−6.3%	1,669.17	0.3/km^{2}
Mount Pleasant No. 2	December 11, 1911	414	383	+8.1%	780.83	0.5/km^{2}
Mountain View No. 318	December 13, 1909	337	333	+1.2%	840.03	0.4/km^{2}
Newcombe No. 260	December 11, 1911	342	400	−14.5%	1,075.6	0.3/km^{2}
Nipawin No. 487	December 9, 1912	1,004	1,030	−2.5%	886.04	1.1/km^{2}
North Battleford No. 437	December 12, 1910	725	733	−1.1%	797.2	0.9/km^{2}
North Qu'Appelle No. 187	December 12, 1910	855	728	+17.4%	494.98	1.7/km^{2}
Norton No. 69	December 13, 1909	233	259	−10.0%	844.8	0.3/km^{2}
Oakdale No. 320	December 13, 1909	253	258	−1.9%	805.92	0.3/km^{2}
Old Post No. 43	January 1, 1967	377	395	−4.6%	1,757	0.2/km^{2}
Orkney No. 244	January 1, 1913	1,875	1,860	+0.8%	806.99	2.3/km^{2}
Paddockwood No. 520	January 1, 1978	895	974	−8.1%	2,456.56	0.4/km^{2}
Parkdale No. 498	January 1, 1913	621	631	−1.6%	1,388.9	0.4/km^{2}
Paynton No. 470	January 1, 1913	255	268	−4.9%	593.95	0.4/km^{2}
Pense No. 160	January 1, 1913	508	471	+7.9%	841.48	0.6/km^{2}
Perdue No. 346	December 13, 1909	445	463	−3.9%	826.14	0.5/km^{2}
Piapot No. 110	December 8, 1913	302	324	−6.8%	1,912.81	0.2/km^{2}
Pinto Creek No. 75	January 1, 1913	283	239	+18.4%	845.49	0.3/km^{2}
Pittville No. 169	January 1, 1913	208	204	+2.0%	1,258.06	0.2/km^{2}
Pleasant Valley No. 288	December 11, 1911	302	345	−12.5%	830.53	0.4/km^{2}
Pleasantdale No. 398	December 11, 1911	596	611	−2.5%	757.91	0.8/km^{2}
Ponass Lake No. 367	January 1, 1913	422	502	−15.9%	750.62	0.6/km^{2}
Poplar Valley No. 12	January 1, 1913	195	200	−2.5%	769.37	0.3/km^{2}
Porcupine No. 395	February 28, 1944	803	820	−2.1%	2,339.96	0.3/km^{2}
Prairie Rose No. 309	December 12, 1910	220	259	−15.1%	839.08	0.3/km^{2}
Prairiedale No. 321	December 13, 1909	247	253	−2.4%	546.74	0.5/km^{2}
Preeceville No. 334	January 1, 1913	919	859	+7.0%	1,394.5	0.7/km^{2}
Prince Albert No. 461	December 9, 1912	3,562	3,601	−1.1%	1,017.44	3.5/km^{2}
Progress No. 351	December 12, 1910	268	260	+3.1%	802.06	0.3/km^{2}
Reciprocity No. 32	December 11, 1911	344	386	−10.9%	733.04	0.5/km^{2}
Redberry No. 435	January 1, 1913	342	372	−8.1%	1,015.2	0.3/km^{2}
Redburn No. 130	January 1, 1913	250	250	0.0%	847.95	0.3/km^{2}
Reford No. 379	December 12, 1910	257	235	+9.4%	707.06	0.4/km^{2}
Reno No. 51	December 11, 1911	379	399	−5.0%	3,461.61	0.1/km^{2}
Riverside No. 168	January 1, 1913	477	490	−2.7%	1,298.39	0.4/km^{2}
Rocanville No. 151	December 9, 1912	507	533	−4.9%	758.48	0.7/km^{2}
Rodgers No. 133	December 9, 1912	90	101	−10.9%	719.8	0.1/km^{2}
Rosedale No. 283	December 13, 1909	526	515	+2.1%	921.51	0.6/km^{2}
Rosemount No. 378	December 12, 1910	201	198	+1.5%	571.35	0.4/km^{2}
Rosthern No. 403	December 9, 1912	2,300	2,015	+14.1%	954.22	2.4/km^{2}
Round Hill No. 467	December 11, 1911	361	446	−19.1%	816.12	0.4/km^{2}
Round Valley No. 410	December 13, 1909	423	361	+17.2%	810.57	0.5/km^{2}
Rudy No. 284	December 13, 1909	466	471	−1.1%	813.86	0.6/km^{2}
Saltcoats No. 213	December 9, 1912	712	673	+5.8%	830.58	0.9/km^{2}
Sarnia No. 221	December 13, 1909	322	266	+21.1%	870.73	0.4/km^{2}
Saskatchewan Landing No. 167	January 1, 1913	415	462	−10.2%	797.52	0.5/km^{2}
Sasman No. 336	January 1, 1913	765	818	−6.5%	1,006.49	0.8/km^{2}
Scott No. 98	December 13, 1909	195	176	+10.8%	850.08	0.2/km^{2}
Senlac No. 411	January 1, 1913	216	195	+10.8%	1,026.75	0.2/km^{2}
Shamrock No. 134	December 9, 1912	205	227	−9.7%	757.52	0.3/km^{2}
Shellbrook No. 493	January 1, 1913	1,587	1,533	+3.5%	1,235.75	1.3/km^{2}
Sherwood No. 159	December 11, 1911	974	879	+10.8%	656.87	1.5/km^{2}
Silverwood No. 123	October 31, 1911	410	466	−12.0%	844.61	0.5/km^{2}
Sliding Hills No. 273	January 1, 1913	421	520	−19.0%	855.28	0.5/km^{2}
Snipe Lake No. 259	December 11, 1911	396	452	−12.4%	1,573.8	0.3/km^{2}
Souris Valley No. 7	December 13, 1909	249	240	+3.8%	817.52	0.3/km^{2}
South Qu'Appelle No. 157	August 6, 1884	1,275	1,271	+0.3%	889.72	1.4/km^{2}
Spalding No. 368	December 11, 1911	453	447	+1.3%	811.47	0.6/km^{2}
Spiritwood No. 496	December 9, 1929	1,347	1,349	−0.1%	2,392.86	0.6/km^{2}
Spy Hill No. 152	December 11, 1911	323	366	−11.7%	679.33	0.5/km^{2}
St. Andrews No. 287	December 12, 1910	522	532	−1.9%	803.75	0.6/km^{2}
St. Louis No. 431	January 1, 1913	1,086	969	+12.1%	790.93	1.4/km^{2}
St. Peter No. 369	December 11, 1911	773	790	−2.2%	823.21	0.9/km^{2}
St. Philips No. 301	January 1, 1913	220	235	−6.4%	655.78	0.3/km^{2}
Stanley No. 215	January 1, 1913	505	516	−2.1%	855.4	0.6/km^{2}
Star City No. 428	January 1, 1913	918	911	+0.8%	824.85	1.1/km^{2}
Stonehenge No. 73	December 11, 1911	319	403	−20.8%	985.74	0.3/km^{2}
Storthoaks No. 31	December 11, 1911	292	304	−3.9%	584.16	0.5/km^{2}
Surprise Valley No. 9	January 1, 1913	217	251	−13.5%	813.93	0.3/km^{2}
Sutton No. 103	December 11, 1911	240	240	0.0%	822.4	0.3/km^{2}
Swift Current No. 137	December 12, 1910	1,932	1,981	−2.5%	1,102.43	1.8/km^{2}
Tecumseh No. 65	December 13, 1909	271	270	+0.4%	824.5	0.3/km^{2}
Terrell No. 101	January 1, 1913	241	224	+7.6%	864.06	0.3/km^{2}
The Gap No. 39	December 12, 1903	199	230	−13.5%	830.92	0.2/km^{2}
Three Lakes No. 400	January 1, 1913	598	620	−3.5%	772.49	0.8/km^{2}
Tisdale No. 427	December 9, 1912	911	916	−0.5%	847.39	1.1/km^{2}
Torch River No. 488	January 1, 1950	1,471	1,468	+0.2%	5,178.9	0.3/km^{2}
Touchwood No. 248	December 12, 1910	343	267	+28.5%	706.72	0.5/km^{2}
Tramping Lake No. 380	December 12, 1910	375	410	−8.5%	615.56	0.6/km^{2}
Tullymet No. 216	January 1, 1913	200	220	−9.1%	562.99	0.4/km^{2}
Turtle River No. 469	December 9, 1912	344	360	−4.4%	664.44	0.5/km^{2}
Usborne No. 310	December 13, 1909	529	547	−3.3%	810.38	0.7/km^{2}
Val Marie No. 17	January 1, 1969	413	420	−1.7%	3,105.26	0.1/km^{2}
Vanscoy No. 345	December 13, 1909	2,840	2,714	+4.6%	865.49	3.3/km^{2}
Victory No. 226	December 8, 1919	380	443	−14.2%	1,375.44	0.3/km^{2}
Viscount No. 341	December 13, 1909	338	371	−8.9%	831.23	0.4/km^{2}
Wallace No. 243	December 11, 1911	852	879	−3.1%	830.24	1.0/km^{2}
Walpole No. 92	December 12, 1910	326	338	−3.6%	844.66	0.4/km^{2}
Waverley No. 44	February 1, 1913	336	359	−6.4%	1,429.3	0.2/km^{2}
Wawken No. 93	January 1, 1913	571	559	+2.1%	766.57	0.7/km^{2}
Webb No. 138	December 13, 1909	541	533	+1.5%	1,098.78	0.5/km^{2}
Wellington No. 97	December 13, 1909	371	356	+4.2%	838.68	0.4/km^{2}
Weyburn No. 67	December 13, 1909	1,064	1,048	+1.5%	808.33	1.3/km^{2}
Wheatlands No. 163	December 13, 1909	149	149	0.0%	827.4	0.2/km^{2}
Whiska Creek No. 106	January 1, 1913	465	499	−6.8%	851.89	0.5/km^{2}
White Valley No. 49	January 1, 1913	478	478	0.0%	2,026.88	0.2/km^{2}
Willner No. 253	January 1, 1913	255	245	+4.1%	835.03	0.3/km^{2}
Willow Bunch No. 42	November 21, 1912	306	361	−15.2%	1,047.77	0.3/km^{2}
Willow Creek No. 458	December 9, 1912	630	693	−9.1%	845.18	0.7/km^{2}
Willowdale No. 153	January 1, 1913	299	297	+0.7%	604.13	0.5/km^{2}
Wilton No. 472	December 13, 1909	1,629	1,494	+9.0%	1,041.27	1.6/km^{2}
Winslow No. 319	December 13, 1909	344	324	+6.2%	798.07	0.4/km^{2}
Wise Creek No. 77	January 1, 1913	205	157	+30.6%	845.81	0.2/km^{2}
Wolseley No. 155	December 13, 1909	372	405	−8.1%	774.26	0.5/km^{2}
Wolverine No. 340	December 13, 1909	480	464	+3.4%	834.78	0.6/km^{2}
Wood Creek No. 281	December 13, 1909	224	205	+9.3%	832.34	0.3/km^{2}
Wood River No. 74	December 9, 1912	433	324	+33.6%	838.45	0.5/km^{2}
Wreford No. 280	December 12, 1910	135	150	−10.0%	798.55	0.2/km^{2}
Total rural municipalities	—	176,535	174,601	+1.1%	307,649.16	0.6/km^{2}

=== Northern municipalities ===
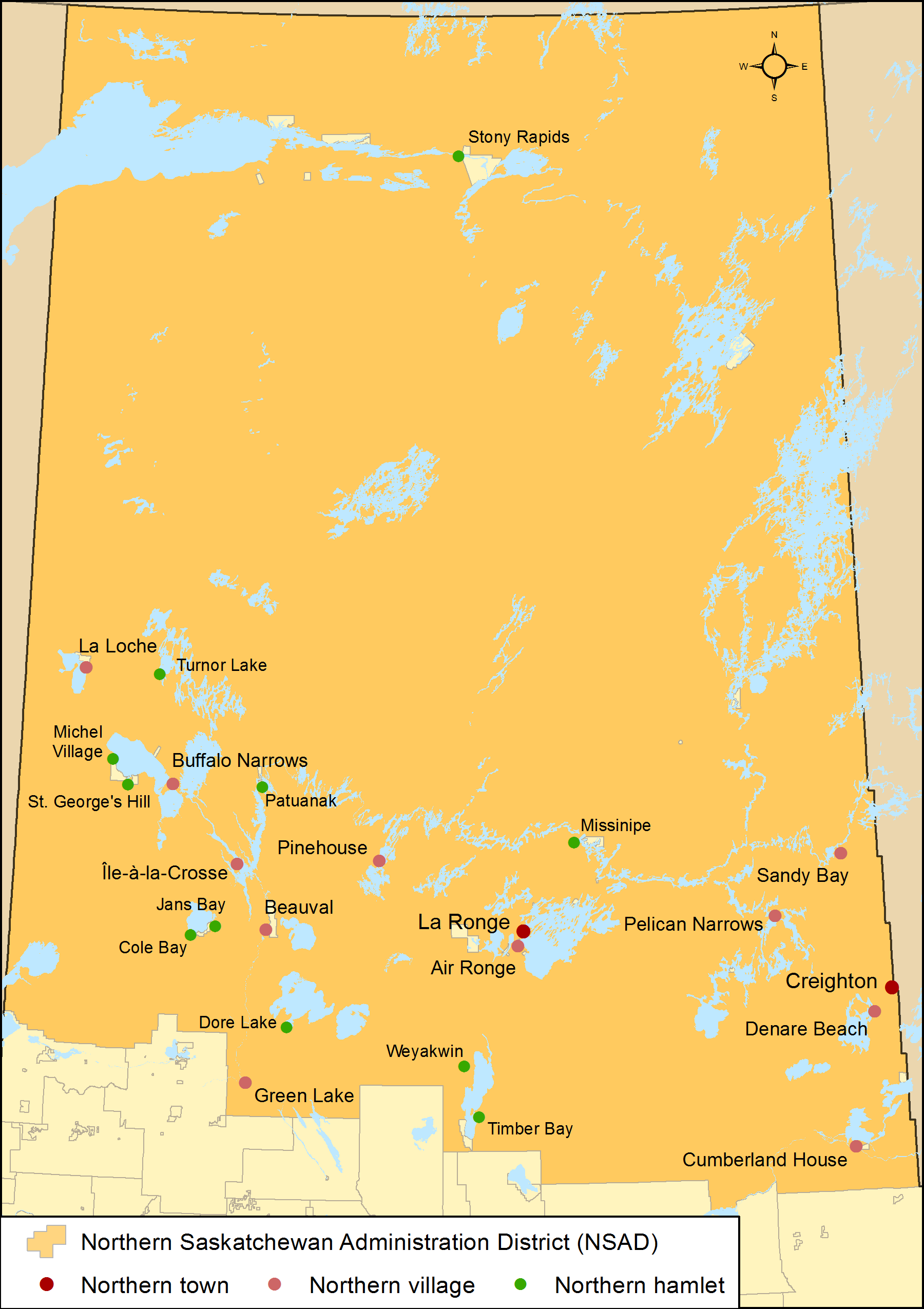
Distribution of Saskatchewan's 2 northern towns, 11 northern villages and 11 northern hamlets within the Northern Saskatchewan Administration District

Saskatchewan has 24 northern municipalities, which includes the sub-types of northern towns, northern villages and northern hamlets.

==== Northern towns ====
A northern town is a town in the Northern Saskatchewan Administration District. Its administration is regulated by The Northern Municipalities Act. A northern village may apply for town status when the actual resident population is at least 500.

Saskatchewan has two northern towns.

Northern towns of Saskatchewan
Name	Incorporation date	Population (2011)	Population (2006)	Change (%)	Land area (km^{2})	Population density (per km^{2})
Creighton	October 1, 1983	1,498	1,502	−0.3	14.39	104.1
La Ronge	May 3, 1905	2,743	2,725	0.7	11.86	231.3
Total northern towns	—	4,241	4,227	0.3	26.25	161.6

==== Northern villages ====
A northern village is located in the Northern Saskatchewan Administration District, and its administration is regulated by The Northern Municipalities Act. A northern hamlet may apply for northern village status when the population is at least 100 and the northern hamlet contains at least 50 separate dwelling units or business premises.

Saskatchewan has 11 northern villages.

Northern villages of Saskatchewan
Name	Incorporation date	Population (2011)	Population (2006)	Change (%)	Land area (km^{2})	Population density (per km^{2})
Air Ronge	July 13, 1977	1,043	1,032	1.1	6.00	173.8
Beauval	November 14, 1969	756	806	−6.2	6.71	112.6
Buffalo Narrows	April 15, 1965	1,153	1,081	6.7	68.63	16.8
Cumberland House	April 15, 1965	831	810	2.6	15.69	53.0
Denare Beach	October 1, 1983	820	785	4.5	5.84	140.4
Green Lake	August 20, 1973	418	361	15.8	121.92	3.4
Île-à-la-Crosse	April 15, 1965	1,365	1,341	1.8	23.84	57.3
La Loche	November 19, 1968	2,611	2,348	11.2	15.59	167.5
Pelican Narrows	October 1, 1983	790	599	31.9	3.70	213.3
Pinehouse	July 6, 1979	978	1,076	−9.1	6.84	142.9
Sandy Bay	April 15, 1965	1,233	1,175	4.9	14.85	83.0
Total northern villages	—	11,998	11,414	5.1	289.61	41.4

==== Northern hamlets ====
A northern hamlet is located in the Northern Saskatchewan Administration District, and its administration is regulated by The Northern Municipalities Act. A northern settlement may apply for northern hamlet status when the population is at least 50 and the northern settlement contains at least 25 separate dwelling units or business premises. Unlike hamlets and northern settlements, northern hamlets are municipal corporations.

Saskatchewan has 11 northern hamlets.

Northern hamlets of Saskatchewan
Name	Incorporation date	Population (2011)	Population (2006)	Change (%)	Land area (km^{2})	Population density (per km^{2})
Black Point	March 26, 2008	47	–	–	–	—
Cole Bay	November 1, 1983	230	156	47.4	4.95	46.5
Dore Lake	January 11, 1985	28	30	−6.7	8.03	3.5
Jans Bay	October 1, 1983	187	181	3.3	5.94	31.5
Michel Village	November 1, 1983	66	79	−16.5	3.73	17.7
Patuanak	December 1, 1983	64	84	−23.8	1.34	47.6
St. George's Hill	December 1, 1983	100	19	426.3	1.46	68.7
Stony Rapids	April 1, 1992	243	255	−4.7	3.96	61.3
Timber Bay	October 1, 1983	93	139	−33.1	4.44	20.9
Turnor Lake	October 1, 1984	179	115	55.7	4.62	38.7
Weyakwin	December 1, 1983	135	99	36.4	8.20	16.5
Total northern hamlets	—	1,372	1,157	18.6	46.67	29.4

== Unincorporated hamlets ==
In Saskatchewan, a hamlet is an unincorporated community that is under the jurisdiction of a rural municipality. It has at least five occupied dwellings situated on separate lots and at least 10 separate lots, the majority of which are an average size of less than one acre.

The Government of Saskatchewan recognizes three different types of hamlets – generic "hamlets", "special service areas" and "organized hamlets". Some organized hamlets in Saskatchewan are recognized as designated places by Statistics Canada, while unorganized hamlets are not.

=== Hamlets ===
Generic hamlets in Saskatchewan are under the jurisdiction of a rural municipality and do not have any decision-making powers or independent authorities.

The following are hamlets that are neither special service areas nor organized hamlets.

- Alticane
- Anglin Lake
- Ardath
- Ardill
- Ardwick
- Arelee
- Armley
- Armour Siding
- Avonhurst
- Baildon
- Baldwinton
- Baljennie
- Bapaume
- Baring
- Barthel
- Bateman
- Batoche
- Battrum
- Bay Trail
- Beacon Hill
- Beadle
- Beaufield (originally named Ednaburg)
- Bechard
- Benito Beach
- Benson
- Berth
- Bertwell
- Besant
- Beverley
- Big Shell
- Birch Lake
- Bird's Point
- Birmingham
- Birsay
- Blackstrap
- Blucher
- Blumenheim
- Blumenhof
- Blumenort
- Bodmin
- Boharm
- Bounty
- Brada
- Bremen
- Bresaylor
- Bridgeford
- Broadacres
- Bromhead
- Brooksby
- Browning
- Buffalo Gap
- Burr
- Burrows
- Bushell Park
- Cactus Lake
- Canora Beach
- Cardross
- Carlea
- Carlton
- Cedoux
- Chamakese
- Chitek
- Chorney Beach
- Chortitz
- Clair
- Clemenceau
- Colfax
- Coop
- Coothill
- Copper Sands
- Corinne
- Cory
- Courval
- Crane Valley
- Crane
- Crooked River
- Crystal Beach
- Danbury
- D'Arcy
- Davis
- Divide
- Dollard
- Donavon (Birdview)
- Duperow (Lydden)
- Duvco
- Edenburg
- Eldersley
- Emma Lake
- Endeavour (Annette)
- England
- Espeseth Cove (Pelican Shores)
- Expanse (former name of Lake Johnston)
- Ferguson Bay
- Fertile
- Fielding
- Fife Lake
- Fir Mountain
- Flintoft
- Floral
- Forgan
- Foxford
- Fulda
- Furness
- Girvin
- Glenbain (Glen Bain)
- Grandora
- Grasswood
- Grenfell Beach
- Griffin
- Guises Beach
- Handel
- Harptree
- Herschel
- Hochstadt
- Hoosier
- Howe Bay
- Inchkeith
- Indian Point
- Insinger
- Instow
- Isham
- Jackfish Lake
- Jan Lake
- Jasmin
- Jedburgh
- Kayville
- Kedleston Beach
- Keeley Lake
- Kinookimaw
- Kuroki Beach
- Lac La Peche
- Lac La Plonge
- Lady Lake
- Langbank
- Laporte
- Laura
- Leacross
- Liebenthal
- Lipp's Beach
- Little Amyot Lake
- Loch Leven
- Lorlie
- Main Centre
- Mantario
- McGee
- McIntosh Point
- Mikado
- Mont Nebo
- Moose Range
- Murray Point
- Neidpath
- Nies Beach
- Nelson Beach
- Nemeiben Lake
- Northgate
- Okema Beach
- Onion Lake
- Oungre
- Parkbeg
- Parkerview (Crowtherview)
- Penzance
- Percival
- Piapot
- Red Deer Hill (originally named Aaskana)
- Redwing
- Reward
- Robsart
- St. Front
- Schantzenfeld
- Schoenfeld
- Serath
- Shipman
- Simmie
- Somme
- Sonningdale
- South Fork
- Sovereign
- Spring Valley
- Springfeld
- Spruce Home
- St. Denis
- Stalwart
- Steelman
- Stony Beach
- Stranraer
- Swanson
- Tarnopol
- Truax
- Uren
- Vantage
- Veregin
- Viceroy
- West Bend
- Wroxton
- Xena
- Zehner
- Zeneta

=== Special service areas ===
Like a generic hamlet, a special service area is under the jurisdiction of a rural municipality and does not have any decision-making powers or independent authorities. Unlike a generic hamlet, a special service area may form its own electoral division within the rural municipality and may have a different tax regime within the rural municipality compared to a generic hamlet.

Special service areas of Saskatchewan
Name	Rural municipality (RM)	Population (2011)
Admiral	Wise Creek No. 77	20
Alsask	Milton No. 292	131
Aneroid	Auvergne No. 76	40
Antler	Antler No. 61	41
Carmichael	Carmichael No. 109	30
Crooked River	Bjorkdale No. 426	40
Dafoe	Big Quill No. 308	15
Domremy	St. Louis No. 431	125
Duff	Stanley No. 215	30
Findlater	Dufferin No. 190	50
Griffin	Griffin No. 66	64
Herschel	Mountain View No. 318	39
Keeler	Marquis No. 191	15
Lake Alma	Lake Alma No. 8	30
Leslie	Foam Lake No. 276	15
Lestock	Kellross No. 247	125
Mantario	Chesterfield No. 261	5
Meyronne	Pinto Creek No. 75	36
Penzance	Sarnia No. 221	25
Primate	Eye Hill No. 382	45
Rockhaven	Cut Knife No. 439	20
Sceptre	Clinworth No. 230	94
Sovereign	St. Andrews No. 287	26
Springwater	Biggar No. 347	15
Stornoway	Wallace No. 243	0
Tribune	Souris Valley No. 7	25
Veregin	Sliding Hills No. 273	70
Welwyn	Moosomin No. 121	135
Willowbrook	Orkney No. 244	35
Yellow Creek	Invergordon No. 430	73

=== Organized hamlets ===
Saskatchewan has 151 organized hamlets that are established via ministerial order and under the jurisdiction of rural municipalities within southern and central Saskatchewan. The people in a hamlet may apply for organized hamlet status within the rural municipality in which the hamlet is located. The minimum requirements for organize status include a permanent population of at least 80 residents, 40 separate dwelling units or places of business, a taxable assessment of at least $4 million, and any other factor the minister may consider appropriate.

Organized hamlets of Saskatchewan
Name	Rural municipality (RM)
Alta Vista	McKillop No. 220
Amsterdam	Buchanan No. 304
Arlington Beach	Last Mountain Valley No. 250
Balone Beach	Hoodoo No. 401
Barrier Ford	Bjorkdale No. 426
Bayard	Terrell No. 101
Bayview Heights	Meota No. 468
Beaubier	Lake Alma No. 8
Beaver Creek	Corman Park No. 344
Bellegarde	Storthoaks No. 31
Big Beaver	Happy Valley No. 10
Blumenthal	Rosthern No. 403
Brancepeth	Birch Hills No. 460
Burgis Beach	Good Lake No. 274
Candiac	Montmartre No. 126
Cannington Lake	Wawken No. 93
Caron	Caron No. 162
Casa Rio	Corman Park No. 344
Cathedral Bluffs	Corman Park No. 344
Cedar Villa Estates	Corman Park No. 344
Chelan	Bjorkdale No. 426
Claybank	Elmsthorpe No. 100
Colesdale Park	McKillop No. 220
Collingwood Lakeshore Estates	McKillop No. 220
Congress	Stonehenge No. 73
Corning	Golden West No. 95
Crawford Estates	Edenwold No. 158
Crutwell	Shellbrook No. 493
Crystal Bay-Sunset	Mervin No. 499
Crystal Lake	Keys No. 303
Crystal Springs	Invergordon No. 430
Cudsaskwa Beach	Hoodoo No. 401
Darlings Beach	Lac Pelletier No. 107
Davin	Lajord No. 128
Day's Beach	Meota No. 468
Deer Valley	Lumsden No. 189
Delmas	Battle River No. 438
Demaine	Victory No. 226
Discovery Ridge	Corman Park No. 344
Eagle Ridge Country Estates	Corman Park No. 344
Edgeley	South Qu'Appelle No. 157
Elbow Lake	Hudson Bay No. 394
Elk Ridge	Lakeland No. 521
Erwood	Hudson Bay No. 394
Evergreen Acres	Mervin No. 499
Evergreen Beach	Mervin No. 499
Exner's Twin Bays	Grayson No. 184
Fairholme	Parkdale No. 498
Fairy Glen	Willow Creek No. 458
Fiske	Pleasant Valley No. 288
Frenchman Butte	Frenchman Butte No. 501
Furdale	Corman Park No. 344
Garrick	Torch River No. 488
Good Spirit Acres	Good Lake No. 274
Gray	Lajord No. 128
Greenspot	Grayson No. 184
Gronlid	Willow Creek No. 458
Guernsey	Usborne No. 310
Hagen	Birch Hills No. 460
Hazel Dell	Hazel Dell No. 335
Hendon	Lakeview No. 337
Hitchcock Bay	Coteau No. 255
Hoey	St. Louis No. 431
Holbein	Shellbrook No. 493
Horseshoe Bay	Parkdale No. 498
Kandahar	Big Quill No. 308
Ketchen	Preeceville No. 334
Kopp's Kove	Mervin No. 499
Kronau	Lajord No. 128
Kuroki	Sasman No. 336
Lakeview	Meota No. 468
Lanz Point	Meota No. 468
Little Fishing Lake	Loon Lake No. 561
Little Swan River	Hudson Bay No. 394
Livelong	Mervin No. 499
Lone Rock	Wilton No. 472
MacDowall	Duck Lake No. 463
MacPheat Park	McKillop No. 220
Martinson's Beach	Meota No. 468
Mayfair	Meeting Lake No. 466
Maymont Beach	Meota No. 468
McCord	Mankota No. 45
Merrill Hills	Corman Park No. 344
Meskanaw	Invergordon No. 430
Mohr's Beach	McKillop No. 220
Moose Bay	Grayson No. 184
Mowrey Beach	Mervin No. 499
Mozart	Elfros No. 307
Mullingar	Meeting Lake No. 466
Nesslin Lake	Big River No. 555
Neuanlage	Rosthern No. 403
Neuhorst	Corman Park No. 344
North Colesdale Park	McKillop No. 220
North Shore Fishing Lake	Sasman No. 336
North Weyburn	Weyburn No. 67
Northside	Paddockwood No. 520
Okla	Hazel Dell No. 335
Ormiston	Lake of the Rivers No. 72
Ottman-Murray Beach	Sasman No. 336
Parkland Beach	Mervin No. 499
Parkview	Marquis No. 191
Parry	Caledonia No. 99
Pasqua Lake	North Qu'Appelle No. 187
Peebles	Chester No. 125
Pelican Cove	Leask No. 464
Pelican Point	Meota No. 468
Pelican Shores	Fertile Belt No. 183
Phillips Grove	Big River No. 555
Powm Beach	Mervin No. 499
Prairie River	Porcupine No. 395
Prince	Meota No. 468
Riceton	Lajord No. 128
River's Edge	Corman Park No. 344
Riverside Estates	Corman Park No. 344
Runnymede	Cote No. 271
Sarnia Beach	Sarnia No. 221
Scout Lake	Willow Bunch No. 42
Sleepy Hollow	Meota No. 468
Snowden	Torch River No. 488
Sorensen Beach	McKillop No. 220
South Waterhen Lake	Meadow Lake No. 588
Spring Bay	McKillop No. 220
Spruce Bay	Spiritwood No. 496
Spruce Lake	Mervin No. 499
St. Isidore-de-Bellevue	St. Louis No. 431
St. Joseph's	South Qu'Appelle No. 157
Summerfield Beach	Meota No. 468
Sunset Beach	Grayson No. 184
Sunset View Beach	Mervin No. 499
Swan Plain	Clayton No. 333
Sylvania	Tisdale No. 427
Tadmore	Buchanan No. 304
Taylor Beach	North Qu'Appelle No. 187
Trevessa Beach	Meota No. 468
Trossachs	Brokenshell No. 68
Tuffnell	Foam Lake No. 276
Turtle Lake South Bay	Mervin No. 499
Tway	Invergordon No. 430
Uhl's Bay	McKillop No. 220
Usherville	Preeceville No. 334
West Chatfield Beach	Meota No. 468
Westview	Stanley No. 215
Wishart	Emerald No. 277
Wymark	Swift Current No. 137

== Northern settlements ==
A northern settlement is an unincorporated community in the Northern Saskatchewan Administration District, and its administration is regulated by The Northern Municipalities Act.

Saskatchewan has 11 northern settlements.

Northern settlements of Saskatchewan
Name	Rural municipality (RM)	Population (2011)
Bear Creek	–	47
Brabant Lake	–	102
Camsell Portage	–	37
Descharme Lake	–	42
Garson Lake	–	34
Missinipe	–	39
Sled Lake	–	35
Southend	–	35
Stanley Mission	–	124
Uranium City	–	201
Wollaston Lake	–	129
Total northern settlements		825

== Ghost towns ==
A ghost town is a town that once had a considerable population, that has since dwindled in numbers causing some or all of its businesses and services to close, either due to the rerouting of a highway, railway tracks being pulled, or exhaustion of some natural resource.

Ghost towns of Saskatchewan
Name	Rural municipality (RM)	Land Address	Lat/Long
Amulet	Norton No. 16		49°37′N 104°45′W
Arena	Frontier No. 19		49°07′01″N 109°16′01″W
Auburnton	Moose Creek No. 33		49°25′N 102°04′W
Baildon	Baildon No. 131		50°09′43″N 105°16′26″W
Bateman	Gravelbourg No. 104		50°01′01″N 106°43′59″W
Battrum	Riverside No. 168		50°32′55″N 108°19′55″W
Bay Trail	Wolverine No. 340		52°07′00″N 105°09′02″W
Bayard	Terrell No. 101		50°01′19″N 105°17′28″W
Bents	Marriott No. 317		51°48′58″N 107°44′02″W
Birch Creek	Emerald No. 277	Sec.10, Twp.30, R.14, W2	
Blewett	Cymri No. 36	SW Sec.12, Twp.5, R.10, W2	49°21′58.41″N 103°14′02.23″W
Bonne Madone	Hoodoo No. 401		52°40′00″N 105°29′04″W
Bounty	Fertile Valley No. 285		51°31′23″N 107°21′45″W
Breeze	Browning No. 34		
Bresaylor	Paynton No. 470		52°58′09″N 108°45′58″W
Bromhead	Souris Valley No. 7	Sec.3, Twp.3, R.13, W2	49°10′54″N 103°40′30″W
Brooking	Laurier No. 38		49°30′00″N 104°25′01″W
Browning	Browning No. 34		49°27′08″N 102°38′02″W
Bryant	Benson No. 35	SW Sec.12 Twp.5 R.9, W2	49°20′53″N 102°59′35″W
Buffalo Gap	Hart Butte No. 11		49°06′56″N 105°16′41″W
Cactus Lake	Heart's Hill No. 352		52°06′51″N 109°48′54″W
Camsell Portage			
Cosine	Eye Hill No. 382		52°08′25″N 109°55′55″W
Canuck	Lone Tree No. 18		49°06′54″N 108°07′48″W
Chandler	Cymri No. 36	SW Sec.10, Twp.5, R.11, W2	49°20′00″N 103°25′01″W
Claydon	Frontier No. 19		49°07′44″N 108°32′31″W
Clearfield	Brokenshell No. 68		
Coalfields	Coalfields No. 4		49.10247° N, 102.74540° W
Colgate	Lomond No. 37	SE Sec.24 Twp.5 R.15, W2	49°23′46″N 103°53′38″W
Court	Antelope Park No. 322		
Crichton	Wise Creek No. 77		49°25′55″N 107°31′23″W
Cullen	Benson No. 35	NW-SW Sec.7 Twp.5 R.7, W2	49°13′N 102°34′W
Cummings	Maple Creek No. 111		50°01′30″N 109°33′43″W
Diana	Bratt's Lake No. 129		50°06′N 104°48′W
Divide	Reno No. 51		49°23′N 109°15′W
Dernic (Federal Grain Spur)	Buchanan No. 304		
Dneiper	Sliding Hills No. 273		
Dobrowody	Invermay No. 305		
Dummer	Caledonia No. 99		49°50′40″N 104°50′13″W
Elcott	Enniskillen No. 3		
Eldorado			
Elswick	Cymri No. 36	NW Sec.2 Twp.5 R.12, W2	49°22′00″N 103°31′59″W
Estuary	Deer Forks No. 232		50°55′59″N 109°54′00″W
Expanse	Lake Johnston No. 102		49°13′19″N 109°10′12″W
Eyre	Chesterfield No. 261		51.27099° N, 109.81812° W
Flintoft	Stonehenge No. 73		
Floral	Corman Park No. 344	Sec.4 Twp.36 R.4, W3	52°03′25″N 106°30′40″W
Forward	Norton No. 69		49°38′21″N 104°28′06″W
Froude	Griffin No. 66		49°40′19″N 103°16′52″W
Fusilier	Antelope Park No. 322		
Garwood	Weyburn No. 67		
Galilee	Terrell No. 101		50°00′N 105°36′W
Gallivan	Cut Knife No. 439		52°42′N 108°54′W
Gibbs	Longlaketon No. 219		50°54′N 104°54′W
Girvin	Arm River No. 252		51°09′00″N 105°55′01″W
Glamis	St. Andrews No. 287	NW_7_28_13_W3	
Glasnevin			49°18′N 105°00′W
Glen Bain	Glen Bain No. 105		
Glen Kerr	Morse No. 165		
Goldfields			
Goodwater	Lomond No. 37		49°23′28″N 103°53′20″W
Gouldtown	Morse No. 165		50°36′39″N 107°13′12″W
Gouverneur	Auvergne No. 76		
Govenlock	Reno No. 51		49°13′01″N 109°48′00″W
Grassdale	Weyburn No. 67		
Gunnar			
Halkett	Estevan No. 5		
Hallonquist	Coulee No. 136		50°06′58″N 107°15′00″W
Handsworth	Golden West No. 95		50°45′N 106°24′W
Hardy	The Gap No. 39		49°28′56″N 104°43′17″W
Harptree	Bengough No. 40		49°18′41″N 105°25′16″W
Hatton	Maple Creek No. 111		50°02′46″N 109°49′39″W
Hearne	Redburn No. 130		50°33′32″N 105°49′52″W
Herschel	Mountain View No. 318		51°39′18″N 108°25′23″W
Hoffer	Souris Valley No. 7		
Holloway	Cymri No. 36	NW Sec.1 Twp.6 R.12, W2	
Horizon	Bengough No. 40		49°31′08″N 105°13′34″W
Hughton	Monet No. 257		51°32′01″N 108°16′52″W
Hume	Griffin No. 66		
Huntoon	Griffin No. 66		
Innes	Griffin No. 66		
Insinger	Insinger No. 275		51°32′00″N 103°04′59″W
Instow	Bone Creek No. 108		49°13′19″N 109°10′12″W
Island Falls			55°31′44″N 102°21′25″W
Jasmin	Ituna Bon Accord No. 246		51°13′42″N 103°38′46″W
Jordan River	Arborfield No. 456		
Kayville	Key West No. 70		49°43′33″N 105°09′00″W
Kingsford	Browning No. 34		
Lakenheath	Stonehenge No. 73		
Lillestrom	Hillsborough No. 132		50°16′00″N 105°52′04″W
Loomis	Frontier No. 19		49°07′19″N 109°26′28″W
Loverna	Antelope Park No. 322		51°40′01″N 110°00′06″W
Luxton	Browning No. 34		
Masefield	Val Marie No. 17		49°55′N 107°29′W
Maxim	Lomond No. 37	NE Sec.21 Twp. 4 R.15, W2	49°18′58.7″N 103°58′43.9″W
Minard	Browning No. 34		
Nashlyn	Reno No. 51		49°12′00″N 109°31′05″W
Neidpath	Coulee No. 136		50°10′44″N 107°22′30″W
Neptune	Lomond No. 37		49°22′21.4″N 104°04′08.8″W
Neville	Whiska Creek No. 106		49°58′16″N 107°40′23″W
New Finland	Willowdale No. 153		50°25′34″N 102°12′47″W
Old Wives	Hillsborough No. 132		50°12′00″N 105°00′04″W
Oungre	Souris Valley No. 7		49°08′44″N 103°48′07″W
Outram	Cambria No. 6		49°09′00″N 103°19′00″W
Oxarat	Reno No. 51		49°26′00″N 109°35′02″W
Parkbeg	Wheatlands No. 163		50°27′00″N 106°16′01″W
Pinto	Coalfields No. 4		
Polwarth	Canwood No. 494		
Rangeview	Reno No. 51		49°12′00″N 109°21′04″W
Ravenscrag	White Valley No. 49		49.5°N 109.268°W
Reynaud	Three Lakes No. 400		
Robinhood	Medstead No. 497		
Robsart	Reno No. 51		49°23′00″N 109°17′02″W
Romance	Leroy No. 339		
Roseray	Pittville No. 169		50°28′00″N 108°29′02″W
Rutland	Colonsay No. 342		52°30′58″N 109°32′53″W
Scotsguard	Bone Creek No. 108		49°43′00″N 108°09′04″W
Senate	Reno No. 51		49°15′40″N 109°48′29″W
Service	Moose Mountain No. 63		
Shand	Estevan No. 5		
Smuts	Grant No. 372		52°26′02″N 106°06′50″W
South Fork	Arlington No. 79		49°36′00″N 108°43′01″W
Southall	Souris Valley No. 7		
St. Boswells	Glen Bain No. 105		50°03′00″N 106°50′02″W
Tableland	Estevan No. 5		
Tarnopol	Invergordon No. 430		52°42′00″N 105°23′02″W
Tatagwa	Weyburn No. 67	NW Sec.17 Twp.8 R.15, W2	
Tate	Mount Hope No. 279		
Tiny	Buchanan No. 304		
Taylorton	Coalfields No. 4		
Trossachs	Brokenshell No. 68		49°38′19″N 104°13′37″W
Truax	Elmsthorpe No. 100		49°54′N 104°57′W
Union Jack	Weyburn No. 67		
Uren	Chaplin No. 164		50°28′27″N 106°45′58″W
Valjean	Chaplin No. 164		50°30′N 106°36′W
Valley Centre	Marriott No. 317		
Vantage	Sutton No. 103		49°50′27″N 106°01′55″W
Verlo	Pittville No. 169		
Vesper	Lac Pelletier No. 107		
Vidora	Reno No. 51		49°20′00″N 109°25′05″W
Viewfield	Benson No. 35	SW S.34 Twp.6 R.9, W2 and NW Sec.27 Twp 6 R.9, W2	49°30′22.8″N 103°08′34.0″W
Wauchope	Antler No. 61		49°36′N 101°54′W
Wheatstone	Key West No. 70		49°44′03.6″N 105°15′04.7″W
Winter	Round Valley No. 410		52°36′59″N 109°30′17″W
Woodley	Browning No. 34		49°15′N 102°32′W
Xena	Morris No. 312		51°43′00″N 105°36′00″W
Yonker	Senlac No. 411		52.652645°N 109.638748°W

== See also ==
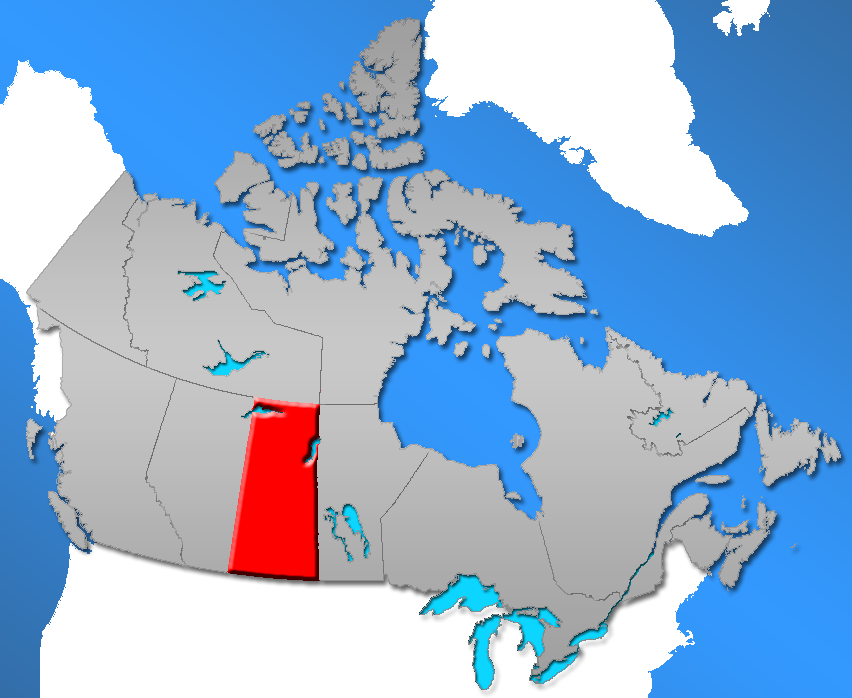
Communities in Canada's provinces and territories
- List of cities in Canada
- List of designated places in Saskatchewan
- List of francophone communities in Saskatchewan

== Other sources ==
- Barry, Bill (1998). People Places : The Dictionary of Saskatchewan Place Names. Regina, Saskatchewan: People Places Publishing Ltd. ISBN 978-1-894022-19-4.
