= Birch Lake, Saskatchewan =

Unincorporated community in Saskatchewan, Canada

Birch Lake
- Unincorporated community
- Location within Saskatchewan Location within Canada
- Coordinates: 53°16′26″N 108°01′28″W
- Country: Canada
- Province: Saskatchewan
- Region: West-central
- Census division: 16
- Rural municipality: Medstead No. 497

Government
  - Governing body: Medstead No. 497
  - Reeve: Archie Latimer
  - Administrator: Christin Baynes
- Time zone: CST
- Postal code: S0M 1W0
- Area code: 306
- Highways: Highway 3

Birch Lake is an unincorporated community in the Rural Municipality of Medstead No. 497, Saskatchewan, Canada. The community is located about 10 kilometres (6.2 mi) north of Highway 3 on Range Road 145, approximately 20 kilometres (12 mi) north of Medstead.

== See also ==
- List of communities in Saskatchewan
