= Moose Range =

Moose Range may refer to:

- The range of moose
- Rural Municipality of Moose Range No. 486, Saskatchewan, Canada
- Moose Range, Saskatchewan, Canada; a village in Rural Municipality of Moose Range No. 486
- Moose Range Lodge, in the East Block of Porcupine Hills Provincial Park, Saskatchewan, Canada

== See also ==
- Kenai National Moose Range, Alaska, USA; former name of the Kenai National Wildlife Refuge
