= Harptree, Saskatchewan =

Hamlet in Saskatchewan, Canada

Coordinates: 49°18′41″N 105°25′15″W

Location of Harptree in Saskatchewan

Harptree is a hamlet in Saskatchewan. The community was named by William Halwell, the first settler, after his original home, The Harptrees (East Harptree/West Harptree) in Somerset, England.

== See also ==
- List of communities in Saskatchewan
