= Chamakese =

Community in Saskatchewan, Canada

Location of Chamakese in Saskatchewan

Chamakese is a hamlet in Saskatchewan. Its coordinates are 53°25′59″N 107°26′35″W / 53.433°and N 107.443°W / 53.433; -107.443.

== See also ==
- List of communities in Saskatchewan
