= Rural Municipality of Browning No. 34 =

Rural municipality in Saskatchewan, Canada

Browning No. 34
- Rural municipality
- Rural Municipality of Browning No. 34
- Location of the RM of Browning No. 34 in Saskatchewan
- Coordinates: 49.389°N 102.650°W
- Country: Canada
- Province: Saskatchewan
- Census division: 1
- SARM division: 1
- Federal riding: Souris—Moose Mountain
- Provincial riding: Cannington
- Formed: December 11, 1911

Government
  - Reeve: Pius Loustel
  - Governing body: RM of Browning No. 34 Council
  - Administrator: Dena Scott
  - Office location: Lampman

Area (2016)
  - Land: 823.38 km^{2} (317.91 sq mi)

Population (2016)
  - Total: 375
  - Density: 0.5/km^{2} (1.3/sq mi)
- Time zone: CST
  - Summer (DST): CST
- Postal code: S0C 1N0
- Area codes: 306 and 639
- Website: Official website

The Rural Municipality of Browning No. 34 (2016 population: 375) is a rural municipality (RM) in the Canadian province of Saskatchewan within Census Division No. 1 and SARM Division No. 1.

== History ==
The RM of Browning No. 34 incorporated as a rural municipality on December 11, 1911. In 1912, the RM had a population of 1,800.

== Geography ==
=== Communities and localities ===
The following urban municipalities are surrounded by the RM.

Towns

- Lampman

The following unincorporated communities are located within the RM.

Unincorporated hamlets

- Wilmar
- Steelman
- Browning

== Demographics ==
Population history (1981–2016)
Year	Pop.	±%
1981	687	—
1986	657	−4.4%
1991	550	−16.3%
1996	552	+0.4%
2001	485	−12.1%
2006	426	−12.2%
2011	399	−6.3%
2016	375	−6.0%
Source: Statistics Canada via Saskatchewan Bureau of Statistics

In the 2021 Census of Population conducted by Statistics Canada, the RM of Browning No. 34 had a population of 355 living in 146 of its 172 total private dwellings, a change of −5.3% from its 2016 population of 375. With a land area of 797 km^{2} (308 sq mi), it had a population density of 0.4/km^{2} (1.2/sq mi) in 2021.

In the 2016 Census of Population, the RM of Browning No. 34 recorded a population of 375 living in 144 of its 163 total private dwellings, a −6% change from its 2011 population of 399. With a land area of 823.38 km^{2} (317.91 sq mi), it had a population density of 0.5/km^{2} (1.2/sq mi) in 2016.

== Government ==
The RM of Browning No. 34 is governed by an elected municipal council and an appointed administrator that meets on the second Wednesday of every month. The reeve of the RM is Pius Loustel while its administrator is Dena Scott. The RM's office is located in Lampman.

== Transportation ==
The Lampman Airport is located within the rural municipality.
