= Buffalo Gap, Saskatchewan =

Community in Saskatchewan, Canada

Coordinates: 49°06′56″N 105°16′41″W

Location of Buffalo Gap in Saskatchewan

Buffalo Gap is a community in the Rural Municipality of Hart Butte No. 11 in Division No. 3 in the Canadian province of Saskatchewan.

The name is a reference to a gap in the hills north of the hamlet through which buffalo herds passed through.

== See also ==
- List of communities in Saskatchewan
