= Chitek =

Community in Saskatchewan, Canada

Coordinates: 53.451°N 107.440°W

Location of Chitek in Saskatchewan

Chitek is a hamlet in the Canadian province of Saskatchewan.

== See also ==
- List of communities in Saskatchewan
