= Roseray =

Hamlet in Saskatchewan, Canada

Coordinates: 50°28′00″N 108°29′03″W

Location of Roseray in Saskatchewan

Roseray is a hamlet in the Canadian province of Saskatchewan, located within the Rural Municipality of Pittville No. 169.

== See also ==
- List of hamlets in Saskatchewan
- List of communities in Saskatchewan
