= Valjean, Saskatchewan =

Community in Saskatchewan, Canada

Coordinates: 50.467°N 106.555°W

Valjean is an unincorporated community in Chaplin Rural Municipality No. 164, Saskatchewan, Canada. The community is located between the villages of Chaplin and Mortlach on Highway 1, about 8 km east of the town of Chaplin. There currently is a population of 2 residents living in Valjean as of 2011.

== See also ==
- List of communities in Saskatchewan
- List of ghost towns in Saskatchewan
