= Moose Range, Saskatchewan =

Hamlet in Saskatchewan, Canada

Coordinates: 53°14′00″N 103°42′02″W

Location of Moose Range in Saskatchewan

Moose Range is a hamlet in the Canadian province of Saskatchewan.

== See also ==
- List of communities in Saskatchewan
- List of hamlets in Saskatchewan
