= Rural Municipality of Medstead No. 497 =

Rural municipality in Saskatchewan, Canada

Medstead No. 497
- Rural municipality
- Rural Municipality of Medstead No. 497
- Location of the RM of Medstead No. 497 in Saskatchewan
- Coordinates: 53.438°N 108.121°W
- Country: Canada
- Province: Saskatchewan
- Census division: 16
- SARM division: 6
- Formed: January 1, 1913

Government
  - Reeve: Ronald Jesse
  - Governing body: RM of Medstead No. 497 Council
  - Administrator: Christin Egeland
  - Office location: Medstead

Area (2016)
  - Land: 1,203.22 km^{2} (464.57 sq mi)

Population (2016)
  - Total: 508
  - Density: 0.4/km^{2} (1.0/sq mi)
- Time zone: CST
  - Summer (DST): CST
- Area codes: 306 and 639

The Rural Municipality of Medstead No. 497 (2016 population: 508) is a rural municipality (RM) in the Canadian province of Saskatchewan within Census Division No. 16 and SARM Division No. 6.

== History ==
The RM of Medstead No. 497 incorporated as a rural municipality on January 1, 1913.

== Geography ==
=== Communities and localities ===
The following urban municipalities are surrounded by the RM.

Villages

- Medstead

The following unincorporated communities are within the RM.

Localities

- Avery
- Belbutte
- Birch Lake
- Cater
- Glenbush
- Park Bluff

== Demographics ==
Population history (1981–2016)
Year	Pop.	±%
1981	872	—
1986	812	−6.9%
1991	689	−15.1%
1996	651	−5.5%
2001	611	−6.1%
2006	524	−14.2%
2011	513	−2.1%
2016	508	−1.0%
Source: Statistics Canada via Saskatchewan Bureau of Statistics

In the 2021 Census of Population conducted by Statistics Canada, the RM of Medstead No. 497 had a population of 489 living in 201 of its 219 total private dwellings, a change of −3.7% from its 2016 population of 508. With a land area of 1,195.14 km^{2} (461.45 sq mi), it had a population density of 0.4/km^{2} (1.1/sq mi) in 2021.

In the 2016 Census of Population, the RM of Medstead No. 497 recorded a population of 508 living in 209 of its 237 total private dwellings, a −1% change from its 2011 population of 513. With a land area of 1,203.22 km^{2} (464.57 sq mi), it had a population density of 0.4/km^{2} (1.1/sq mi) in 2016.

== Government ==
The RM of Medstead No. 497 is governed by an elected municipal council and an appointed administrator that meets on the second Friday of every month. The reeve of the RM is Ronald Jesse while its administrator is Christin Egeland. The RM's office is located in Medstead.

== Transportation ==
- Saskatchewan Highway 3
- Saskatchewan Highway 794
- Canadian Pacific Railway (abandoned)

== See also ==
- List of rural municipalities in Saskatchewan
