= Little Swan River, Saskatchewan =

Coordinates: 52°24′04″N 102°09′47″W

Little Swan Subdivision is a hamlet in the Canadian province of Saskatchewan.

== Demographics ==
In the 2021 Census of Population conducted by Statistics Canada, Little Swan River had a population of 30 living in 12 of its 47 total private dwellings, a change of inf% from its 2016 population of . With a land area of 0.78 km^{2} (0.30 sq mi), it had a population density of 38.5/km^{2} (99.6/sq mi) in 2021.
