= Coothill =

Railway point in Saskatchewan, Canada

Coordinates: 50°13′59″N 101°52′59″W

Location of Coothill in Saskatchewan

Coothill is a railway point in the Canadian province of Saskatchewan.
