= Uren, Saskatchewan =

Human settlement in Saskatchewan, Canada

Coordinates: 50°28′27″N 106°45′57″W

Location of Uren in Saskatchewan

Uren is an unincorporated community in Saskatchewan. It is located in the Rural Municipality of Chaplin No. 164.

== Wildlife ==
The Uren Marsh is located south of Uren on the north-south grid road between the westbound (northern) and eastbound (southern) lanes of Highway 1. Though this area is privately owned with no official designation, the marsh is known to bird watchers.

Like nearby Chaplin Lake, which is crucial habitat for many shorebird species, Uren Marsh supports many birds. Black-necked Stilts, which are relatively uncommon but expanding in Saskatchewan, can sometimes be viewed in the marsh from the grid road. Examples of shorebird species that have been reported to use the marsh as a place to rest and feed during migration include Semipalmated Sandpipers, Least Sandpipers, and Pectoral Sandpipers.

Numerous species of grassland birds, which are in steep decline in Canada, are also present in area during the summer.
