= Rural Municipality of Chaplin No. 164 =

Rural municipality in Saskatchewan, Canada

Chaplin No. 164
- Rural municipality
- Rural Municipality of Chaplin No. 164
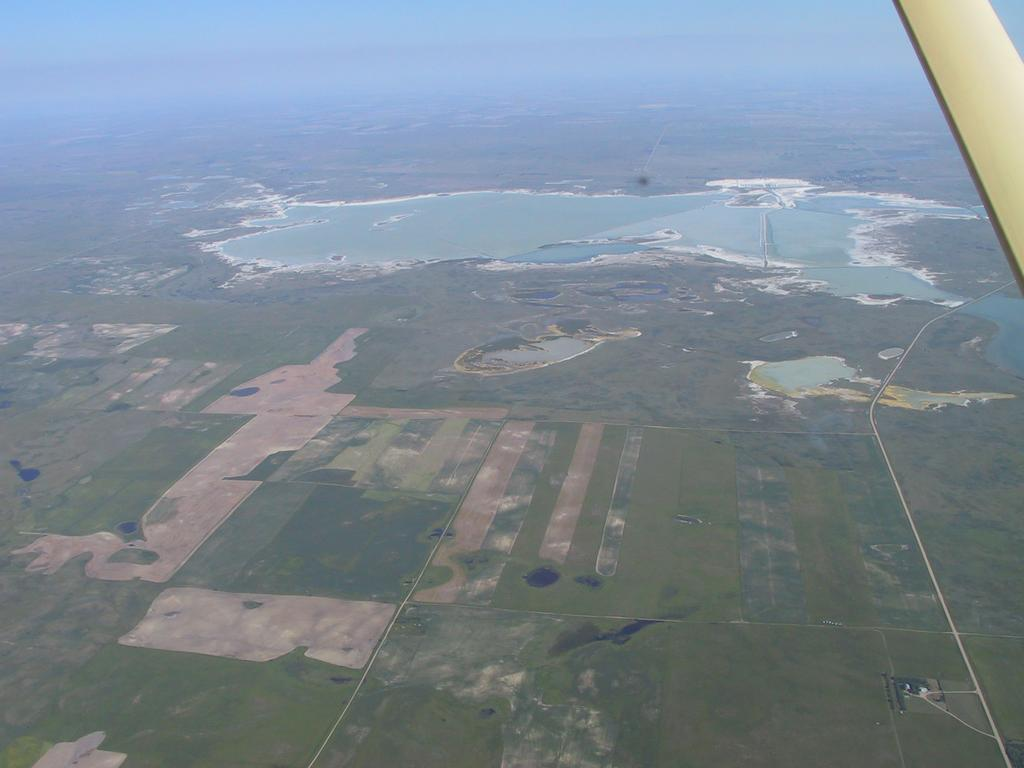
- Aerial view of Highway 58 through Chaplin Lake

- Location of the RM of Chaplin No. 164 in Saskatchewan
- Coordinates: 50.449°N 106.623°W
- Country: Canada
- Province: Saskatchewan
- Census division: 7
- SARM division: 2
- Formed: January 1, 1913

Government
  - Reeve: Duane Doell
  - Governing body: RM of Chaplin No. 164 Council
  - Administrator: Faye Campbell
  - Office location: Chaplin

Area (2016)
  - Land: 802.74 km^{2} (309.94 sq mi)

Population (2016)
  - Total: 113
  - Density: 0.1/km^{2} (0.26/sq mi)
- Time zone: CST
  - Summer (DST): CST
- Area codes: 306 and 639

The Rural Municipality of Chaplin No. 164 (2016 population: 113) is a rural municipality (RM) in the Canadian province of Saskatchewan within Census Division No. 7 and SARM Division No. 2. It is located in the southwest portion of the province.

== History ==
The RM of Chaplin No. 164 incorporated as a rural municipality on January 1, 1913.

== Geography ==
Chaplin Lake, a large saline lake, is located in the RM.

=== Communities ===
The following urban municipalities are surrounded by the RM.

Villages

- Chaplin

The following unincorporated communities are located within the RM.

Localities

- Droxford
- Halvorgate
- Melaval
- Valjean
- Uren

== Demographics ==
Population history (1981–2016)
| Year | Pop. | ±% |
|---|---|---|
| 1981 | 305 | — |
| 1986 | 278 | −8.9% |
| 1991 | 231 | −16.9% |
| 1996 | 198 | −14.3% |
| 2001 | 160 | −19.2% |
| 2006 | 138 | −13.7% |
| 2011 | 147 | +6.5% |
| 2016 | 113 | −23.1% |
Source: Statistics Canada via Saskatchewan Bureau of Statistics

In the 2021 Census of Population conducted by Statistics Canada, the RM of Chaplin No. 164 had a population of 127 living in 52 of its 68 total private dwellings, a change of 12.4% from its 2016 population of 113. With a land area of 837.96 km^{2} (323.54 sq mi), it had a population density of 0.2/km^{2} (0.4/sq mi) in 2021.

In the 2016 Census of Population, the RM of Chaplin No. 164 recorded a population of 113 living in 45 of its 51 total private dwellings, a −23.1% change from its 2011 population of 147. With a land area of 802.74 km^{2} (309.94 sq mi), it had a population density of 0.1/km^{2} (0.4/sq mi) in 2016.

== Economy ==
The production of sodium sulphate is a major industry combined with grain and livestock agriculture.

== Government ==
The RM of Chaplin No. 164 is governed by an elected municipal council and an appointed administrator that meets on the second Tuesday of every month. The reeve of the RM is Duane Doell while its administrator is Faye Campbell. The RM's office is located in Chaplin.
