= Steelman, Saskatchewan =

Community in Saskatchewan, Canada

Coordinates: 49°18′00″N 102°36′02″W

Location of Steelman in Saskatchewan

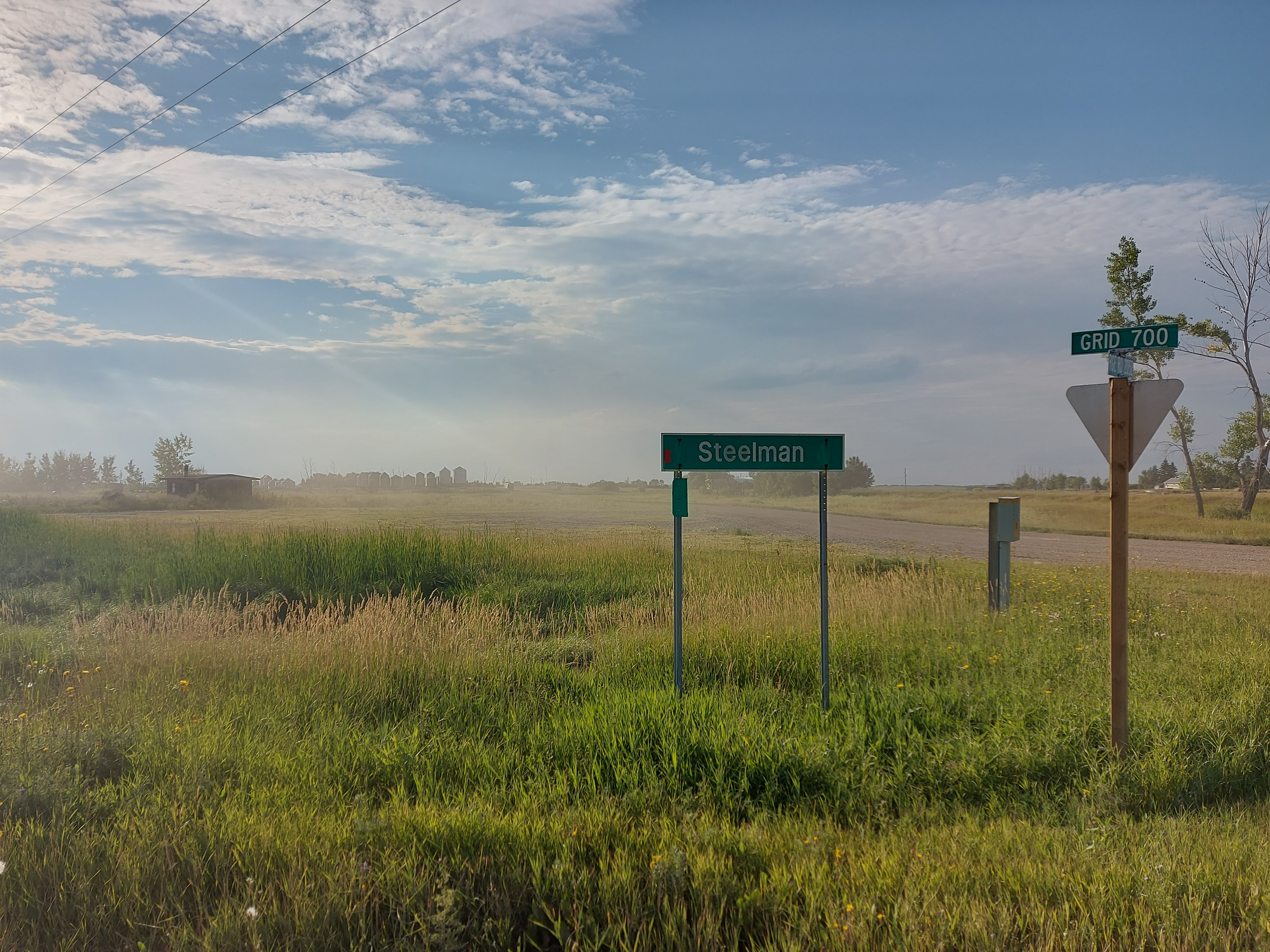
Steelman

Steelman is a hamlet in the Canadian province of Saskatchewan. Access is from Highway 700.

== See also ==
- List of communities in Saskatchewan
- list of ghost towns in Saskatchewan
