= Blumenheim =

Community in Saskatchewan, Canada

Coordinates: 52°22′35″N 106°30′28″W

Location of Blumenheim in Saskatchewan

Blumenheim is an unincorporated community in the Canadian province of Saskatchewan.
