= Medstead, Saskatchewan =

Village in Saskatchewan, Canada

Village of Medstead
- Village
- Location of Medstead in Saskatchewan Village of Medstead (Canada)
- Coordinates: 53.305°N 108.043°W
- Country: Canada
- Province: Saskatchewan
- Region: West-central
- Census division: 16
- Rural municipality: Medstead No. 497
- Post office Founded: N/A
- Incorporated (Village): N/A
- Incorporated (Town): N/A

Government
  - Mayor: Robert Bonsan
  - Administrator: Debbie A. Arsenault
  - Governing body: Medstead Village Council

Area
  - Total: 0.67 km^{2} (0.26 sq mi)

Population (2006)
  - Total: 148
  - Density: 213.4/km^{2} (553/sq mi)
- Time zone: CST
- Postal code: S0M 1W0
- Area code: 306
- Highways: Highway 794

Medstead (2016 population: 130) is a village in the Canadian province of Saskatchewan within the Rural Municipality of Medstead No. 497 and Census Division No. 16.

== History ==
Medstead incorporated as a village on April 23, 1931.

== Demographics ==
Population history (1981–2016)
Year	Pop.	±%
1981	163	—
1986	180	+10.4%
1991	172	−4.4%
1996	162	−5.8%
2001	144	−11.1%
2006	148	+2.8%
2011	120	−18.9%
2016	130	+8.3%
Source: Statistics Canada via Saskatchewan Bureau of Statistics

In the 2021 Census of Population conducted by Statistics Canada, Medstead had a population of 121 living in 60 of its 73 total private dwellings, a change of −6.9% from its 2016 population of 130. With a land area of 0.65 km^{2} (0.25 sq mi), it had a population density of 186.2/km^{2} (482.1/sq mi) in 2021.

In the 2016 Census of Population, the Village of Medstead recorded a population of 130 living in 65 of its 72 total private dwellings, a 7.7% change from its 2011 population of 120. With a land area of 0.67 km^{2} (0.26 sq mi), it had a population density of 194.0/km^{2} (502.5/sq mi) in 2016.

== See also ==
- List of communities in Saskatchewan
- List of villages in Saskatchewan
