= Rural Municipality of Pittville No. 169 =

Rural municipality in Saskatchewan, Canada

Pittville No. 169
- Rural municipality
- Rural Municipality of Pittville No. 169

- Location of the RM of Pittville No. 169 in Saskatchewan
- Coordinates: 50.448°N 108.741°W
- Country: Canada
- Province: Saskatchewan
- Census division: 8
- SARM division: 3
- Formed: January 1, 1913

Government
  - Reeve: Larry Sletten
  - Governing body: RM of Pittville No. 169 Council
  - Administrator: Terry Erdelyan
  - Office location: Hazlet

Area (2016)
  - Land: 1,258.06 km^{2} (485.74 sq mi)

Population (2016)
  - Total: 208
  - Density: 0.2/km^{2} (0.52/sq mi)
- Time zone: CST
  - Summer (DST): CST
- Postal code: S0N 1E0
- Area codes: 306 and 639
- Highway(s): Highway 332

The Rural Municipality of Pittville No. 169 (2016 population: 208) is a rural municipality (RM) in the Canadian province of Saskatchewan within Census Division No. 8 and SARM Division No. 3. Located in the southwest portion of the province, it lies northwest of the town of Gull Lake.

== History ==
The RM of Pittville No. 169 incorporated as a rural municipality on January 1, 1913.

== Geography ==
=== Communities and localities ===
The following urban municipalities are surrounded by the RM.

Villages

- Hazlet

The following unincorporated communities are located in the RM.

Localities

- Nadeauville
- Roadene
- Roseray
- Verlo

=== Parks and recreation ===
- Hazlet Regional Park

== Demographics ==
Population history (1981–2016)
Year	Pop.	±%
1981	406	—
1986	356	−12.3%
1991	309	−13.2%
1996	291	−5.8%
2001	272	−6.5%
2006	216	−20.6%
2011	204	−5.6%
2016	208	+2.0%
Source: Statistics Canada via Saskatchewan Bureau of Statistics

In the 2021 Census of Population conducted by Statistics Canada, the RM of Pittville No. 169 had a population of 201 living in 81 of its 93 total private dwellings, a change of −3.4% from its 2016 population of 208. With a land area of 1,256.42 km^{2} (485.11 sq mi), it had a population density of 0.2/km^{2} (0.4/sq mi) in 2021.

In the 2016 Census of Population, the RM of Pittville No. 169 recorded a population of 208 living in 82 of its 107 total private dwellings, a 2% change from its 2011 population of 204. With a land area of 1,258.06 km^{2} (485.74 sq mi), it had a population density of 0.2/km^{2} (0.4/sq mi) in 2016.

== Government ==
The RM of Pittville No. 169 is governed by an elected municipal council and an appointed administrator that meets on the second Tuesday of every month. The reeve of the RM is Larry Sletten while its administrator is Terry Erdelyan. The RM's office is located in Hazlet.

== Standing Rock ==
Standing Rock (50.3944°N 108.6857°W) is a large glacial erratic left from the last ice age around 14,000 years ago. It is composed of granite from the Hudson Bay area and is 3.35 m (11.0 ft) high and 9.14 m (30.0 ft) long. It is about 6 kilometres (3.7 mi) west of Hazlet along Highway 332. It was used as a scratching post for bison for centuries, and as a landmark by First Nations and later on by early settlers. It is a recorded petrograph site and is now a historical site.

== Transportation ==
Highways within the RM include:

- Highway 332
- Highway 633
- Highway 728

== See also ==
- List of rural municipalities in Saskatchewan
