= List of designated places in Saskatchewan =

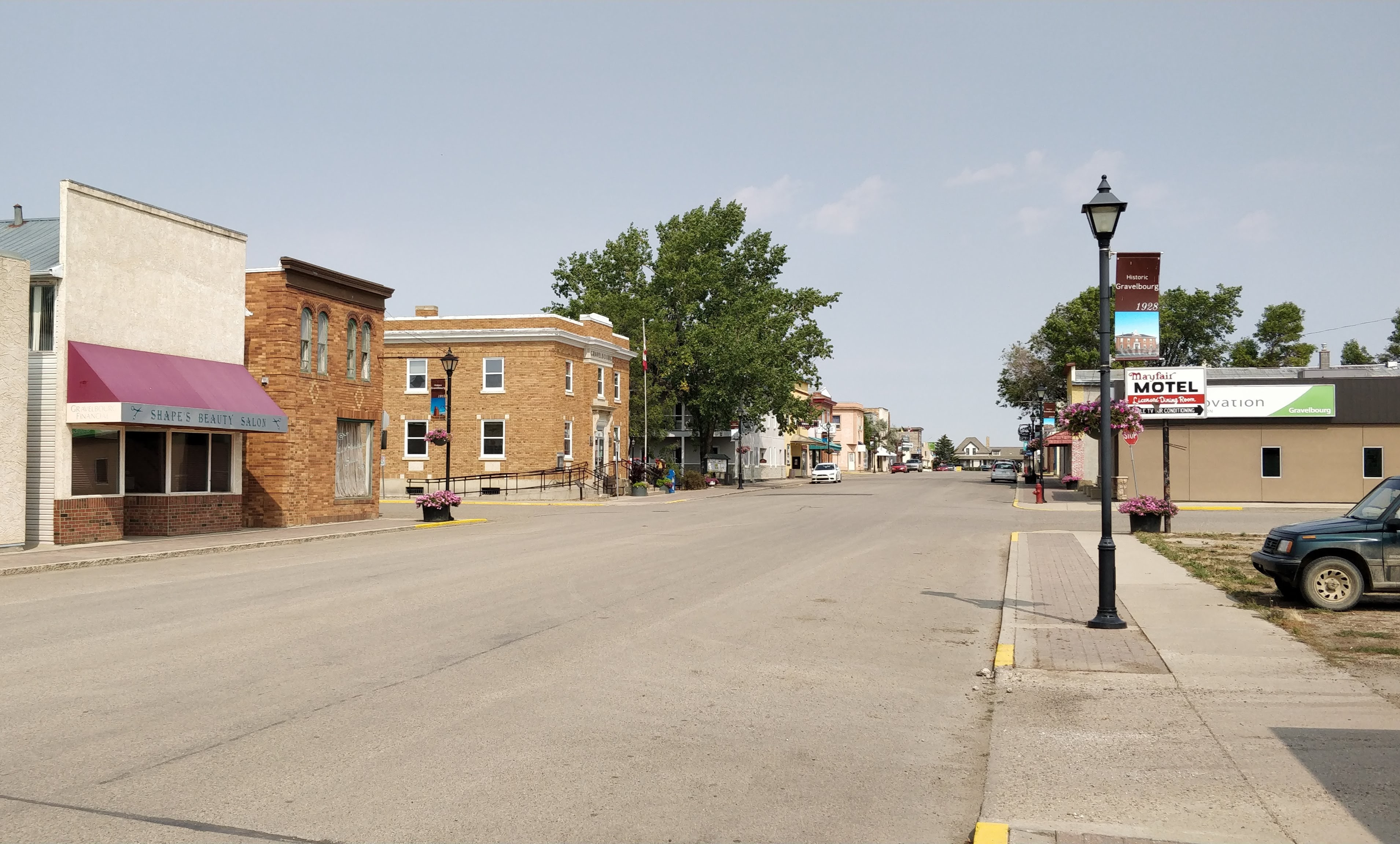
Downtown main street of Gravelbourg, Saskatchewan's most populous designated place

A designated place is a type of geographic unit used by Statistics Canada to disseminate census data. It is usually "a small community that does not meet the criteria used to define incorporated municipalities or Statistics Canada population centres (areas with a population of at least 1,000 and no fewer than 400 persons per square kilometre)." Provincial and territorial authorities collaborate with Statistics Canada in the creation of designated places, so that data can be published for sub-areas within municipalities. Starting in 2016, Statistics Canada allowed the overlapping of designated places with population centres.

In the 2021 Census of Population, Saskatchewan had 198 designated places, an increase from 193 in 2016. Designated place types in Saskatchewan include 2 cluster subdivisions, 40 dissolved municipalities, 9 northern settlements, 143 organized hamlets, 2 resort subdivisions, and 2 retired population centre. In 2021, the 198 designated places had a cumulative population of 11,858, and an average population of 60. Saskatchewan's largest designated place is Gravelbourg with a population of 986.

== List ==
List of designated places in Saskatchewan
Name	Type	2021 Census of Population				
Name	Type	Population (2021)	Population (2016)	Change (%)	Land area (km^{2})	Population density (per km^{2})
Admiral	Dissolved municipality	15	20	−25.0%	1.87	8.0/km^{2}
Alsask	Dissolved municipality	113	111	+1.8%	1.87	60.4/km^{2}
Alta Vista	Organized hamlet	33	36	−8.3%	0.14	235.7/km^{2}
Amsterdam	Organized hamlet	30	25	+20.0%	0.3	100.0/km^{2}
Aneroid	Dissolved municipality	25	50	−50.0%	0.97	25.8/km^{2}
Antler	Dissolved municipality	30	40	−25.0%	0.7	42.9/km^{2}
Arelee	Dissolved municipality	10	10	0.0%	0.3	33.3/km^{2}
Arlington Beach	Organized hamlet	38	20	+90.0%	0.5	76.0/km^{2}
Balone Beach	Organized hamlet	18	5	+260.0%	0.05	360.0/km^{2}
Bankend	Organized hamlet	15	15	0.0%	0.28	53.6/km^{2}
Barrier Ford	Organized hamlet	30	20	+50.0%	0.17	176.5/km^{2}
Bayview Heights	Organized hamlet	10	15	−33.3%	0.05	200.0/km^{2}
Bear Creek	Northern settlement	45	33	+36.4%	1.95	23.1/km^{2}
Beaubier	Organized hamlet	20	30	−33.3%	0.08	250.0/km^{2}
Beaver Creek	Organized hamlet	111	107	+3.7%	2.05	54.1/km^{2}
Bellegarde	Organized hamlet	35	30	+16.7%	0.15	233.3/km^{2}
Benson	Dissolved municipality	95	116	−18.1%	0.45	211.1/km^{2}
Big Beaver	Organized hamlet	10	10	0.0%	0.22	45.5/km^{2}
Birsay	Dissolved municipality	40	46	−13.0%	0.78	51.3/km^{2}
Blumenthal	Organized hamlet	123	102	+20.6%	0.71	173.2/km^{2}
Brancepeth	Organized hamlet	20	35	−42.9%	0.2	100.0/km^{2}
Burgis Beach	Organized hamlet	113	55	+105.5%	0.36	313.9/km^{2}
Camsell Portage	Northern settlement	0	10	−100.0%	4.14	0.0/km^{2}
Candiac	Organized hamlet	10	20	−50.0%	0.28	35.7/km^{2}
Cando	Dissolved municipality	70	66	+6.1%	0.64	109.4/km^{2}
Caron	Organized hamlet	199	163	+22.1%	0.66	301.5/km^{2}
Cedar Villa Estates	Organized hamlet	113	104	+8.7%	0.68	166.2/km^{2}
Chelan	Organized hamlet	45	55	−18.2%	0.2	225.0/km^{2}
Chortitz	Organized hamlet	15	19	−21.1%	0.21	71.4/km^{2}
Claybank	Organized hamlet	15	15	0.0%	0.18	83.3/km^{2}
Clemenceau	Organized hamlet	15	10	+50.0%	0.27	55.6/km^{2}
Colesdale Park	Organized hamlet	25	20	+25.0%	0.09	277.8/km^{2}
Congress	Organized hamlet	20	20	0.0%	0.99	20.2/km^{2}
Corning	Organized hamlet	25	25	0.0%	0.21	119.0/km^{2}
Crane Valley	Organized hamlet	20	15	+33.3%	0.52	38.5/km^{2}
Crooked River	Organized hamlet	49	32	+53.1%	0.28	175.0/km^{2}
Crutwell	Organized hamlet	77	57	+35.1%	0.09	855.6/km^{2}
Crystal Bay-Sunset	Organized hamlet	39	15	+160.0%	0.53	73.6/km^{2}
Crystal Lake part A	Organized hamlet	115	61	+88.5%	0.8	143.8/km^{2}
Crystal Lake part B	Organized hamlet	56	31	+80.6%	0.42	133.3/km^{2}
Crystal Springs	Organized hamlet	20	15	+33.3%	0.3	66.7/km^{2}
Cudsaskwa Beach	Organized hamlet	61	52	+17.3%	0.05	1,220.0/km^{2}
Davin	Organized hamlet	50	43	+16.3%	0.2	250.0/km^{2}
Day's Beach	Organized hamlet	43	35	+22.9%	0.26	165.4/km^{2}
Delmas	Organized hamlet	103	128	−19.5%	0.47	219.1/km^{2}
Demaine	Organized hamlet	20	25	−20.0%	0.29	69.0/km^{2}
Descharme Lake	Northern settlement	26	5	+420.0%	0.24	108.3/km^{2}
Dollard	Dissolved municipality	20	5	+300.0%	0.56	35.7/km^{2}
Domremy	Dissolved municipality	113	101	+11.9%	0.66	171.2/km^{2}
Eagle Point	Cluster subdivision	105	91	+15.4%	1	105.0/km^{2}
Edgeley	Organized hamlet	41	45	−8.9%	0.16	256.3/km^{2}
Elbow Lake	Organized hamlet	10	0	NA	0.01	1,000.0/km^{2}
Eldersley	Organized hamlet	25	30	−16.7%	0.16	156.3/km^{2}
Erwood	Organized hamlet	35	50	−30.0%	0.44	79.5/km^{2}
Evergreen Acres	Organized hamlet	43	20	+115.0%	0.15	286.7/km^{2}
Evergreen Brightsand	Organized hamlet	53	26	+103.8%	0.93	57.0/km^{2}
Fairholme	Organized hamlet	20	15	+33.3%	0.16	125.0/km^{2}
Fairy Glen	Organized hamlet	37	30	+23.3%	0.27	137.0/km^{2}
Fife Lake	Organized hamlet	25	25	0.0%	0.36	69.4/km^{2}
Fiske	Organized hamlet	74	65	+13.8%	0.54	137.0/km^{2}
Frenchman Butte	Organized hamlet	235	53	+343.4%	0.77	305.2/km^{2}
Furdale	Organized hamlet	181	188	−3.7%	1.99	91.0/km^{2}
Garrick	Organized hamlet	15	20	−25.0%	0.25	60.0/km^{2}
Garson Lake	Northern settlement	10	10	0.0%	1.34	7.5/km^{2}
Girvin	Dissolved municipality	25	15	+66.7%	0.78	32.1/km^{2}
Gladmar	Dissolved municipality	37	57	−35.1%	0.49	75.5/km^{2}
Good Spirit Acres	Organized hamlet	138	133	+3.8%	1.34	103.0/km^{2}
Gravelbourg	Retired population centre	986	1,083	−9.0%	3.12	316.0/km^{2}
Gray	Organized hamlet	58	94	−38.3%	0.28	207.1/km^{2}
Griffin	Organized hamlet	128	111	+15.3%	0.61	209.8/km^{2}
Gronlid	Organized hamlet	71	74	−4.1%	0.38	186.8/km^{2}
Guernsey	Organized hamlet	95	97	−2.1%	0.66	143.9/km^{2}
Hagen	Organized hamlet	25	32	−21.9%	0.19	131.6/km^{2}
Handel	Dissolved municipality	20	20	0.0%	2.73	7.3/km^{2}
Hazel Dell	Organized hamlet	15	15	0.0%	0.42	35.7/km^{2}
Hendon	Organized hamlet	10	20	−50.0%	0.28	35.7/km^{2}
Herschel	Dissolved municipality	30	30	0.0%	1.28	23.4/km^{2}
Hitchcock Bay	Organized hamlet	108	64	+68.8%	1.28	84.4/km^{2}
Hoey	Organized hamlet	53	45	+17.8%	0.33	160.6/km^{2}
Holbein	Organized hamlet	122	109	+11.9%	0.5	244.0/km^{2}
Horseshoe Bay	Organized hamlet	90	37	+143.2%	0.8	112.5/km^{2}
Indian Point-Golden Sands	Organized hamlet	137	88	+55.7%	0.8	171.3/km^{2}
Kandahar	Organized hamlet	10	20	−50.0%	0.46	21.7/km^{2}
Kayville	Organized hamlet	10	10	0.0%	0.36	27.8/km^{2}
Ketchen	Organized hamlet	20	15	+33.3%	0.18	111.1/km^{2}
Khedive	Dissolved municipality	20	15	+33.3%	0.58	34.5/km^{2}
Kimosom Pwatinahk 203 (Deschambault Lake)	Retired population centre	840	1,046	−19.7%	1.4	600.0/km^{2}
Kopp's Kove	Organized hamlet	55	35	+57.1%	0.16	343.8/km^{2}
Kronau	Organized hamlet	288	394	−26.9%	0.67	429.9/km^{2}
Kuroki	Organized hamlet	35	50	−30.0%	0.53	66.0/km^{2}
Kylemore	Organized hamlet	5	0	NA	0.25	20.0/km^{2}
Lady Lake	Organized hamlet	20	10	+100.0%	0.34	58.8/km^{2}
Lakeview	Organized hamlet	80	42	+90.5%	0.22	363.6/km^{2}
Langbank	Organized hamlet	20	25	−20.0%	0.2	100.0/km^{2}
Lanz Point	Organized hamlet	56	37	+51.4%	0.12	466.7/km^{2}
Leslie	Dissolved municipality	20	15	+33.3%	0.55	36.4/km^{2}
Lisieux	Organized hamlet	10	10	0.0%	0.21	47.6/km^{2}
Little Fishing Lake	Organized hamlet	45	20	+125.0%	0.26	173.1/km^{2}
Little Swan River	Organized hamlet	30	0	NA	0.78	38.5/km^{2}
Livelong	Organized hamlet	100	74	+35.1%	0.17	588.2/km^{2}
Lockwood	Dissolved municipality	5	15	−66.7%	0.73	6.8/km^{2}
Lone Rock	Organized hamlet	50	76	−34.2%	0.33	151.5/km^{2}
Loverna	Dissolved municipality	5	5	0.0%	0.64	7.8/km^{2}
MacDowall	Organized hamlet	119	125	−4.8%	0.9	132.2/km^{2}
Mantario	Dissolved municipality	15	5	+200.0%	0.77	19.5/km^{2}
Martinson's Beach	Organized hamlet	49	50	−2.0%	0.12	408.3/km^{2}
Mayfair	Organized hamlet	20	30	−33.3%	0.09	222.2/km^{2}
Maymont Beach	Organized hamlet	36	35	+2.9%	0.19	189.5/km^{2}
Mazenod	Dissolved municipality	25	10	+150.0%	3.77	6.6/km^{2}
McCord	Organized hamlet	25	30	−16.7%	0.34	73.5/km^{2}
Meskanaw	Organized hamlet	15	20	−25.0%	0.07	214.3/km^{2}
Meyronne	Dissolved municipality	20	35	−42.9%	0.41	48.8/km^{2}
Mikado	Organized hamlet	40	25	+60.0%	0.41	97.6/km^{2}
Missinipe	Northern settlement	27	5	+440.0%	1.5	18.0/km^{2}
Mohr's Beach	Organized hamlet	15	0	NA	0.3	50.0/km^{2}
Moose Bay	Organized hamlet	71	41	+73.2%	0.23	308.7/km^{2}
Mozart	Organized hamlet	28	25	+12.0%	0.23	121.7/km^{2}
Napatak	Resort subdivision	118	134	−11.9%	0.57	207.0/km^{2}
Nesslin Lake	Organized hamlet	15	5	+200.0%	0.11	136.4/km^{2}
Neuanlage	Organized hamlet	571	522	+9.4%	1.99	286.9/km^{2}
Neuhorst	Organized hamlet	89	114	−21.9%	0.3	296.7/km^{2}
North Colesdale Park	Organized hamlet	22	30	−26.7%	0.11	200.0/km^{2}
North Shore Fishing Lake	Organized hamlet	151	74	+104.1%	0.41	368.3/km^{2}
North Weyburn	Organized hamlet	96	111	−13.5%	0.61	157.4/km^{2}
Northside	Organized hamlet	35	30	+16.7%	0.31	112.9/km^{2}
Nut Mountain	Organized hamlet	5	10	−50.0%	0.34	14.7/km^{2}
Okla	Organized hamlet	20	10	+100.0%	0.41	48.8/km^{2}
Ormiston	Organized hamlet	10	10	0.0%	0.35	28.6/km^{2}
Otthon	Organized hamlet	56	73	−23.3%	0.27	207.4/km^{2}
Ottman-Murray Beach	Organized hamlet	46	15	+206.7%	0.59	78.0/km^{2}
Oungre	Organized hamlet	10	20	−50.0%	0.16	62.5/km^{2}
Palmer	Dissolved municipality	20	10	+100.0%	2.47	8.1/km^{2}
Parkland Beach	Organized hamlet	27	10	+170.0%	0.38	71.1/km^{2}
Parkview	Organized hamlet	56	32	+75.0%	0.39	143.6/km^{2}
Parry	Organized hamlet	15	15	0.0%	0.24	62.5/km^{2}
Pasqua Lake	Organized hamlet	213	200	+6.5%	0.64	332.8/km^{2}
Peebles	Organized hamlet	15	20	−25.0%	0.07	214.3/km^{2}
Pelican Cove	Organized hamlet	69	42	+64.3%	0.33	209.1/km^{2}
Pelican Point	Organized hamlet	50	29	+72.4%	0.25	200.0/km^{2}
Pelican Shores	Organized hamlet	10	5	+100.0%	0.08	125.0/km^{2}
Penzance	Dissolved municipality	30	25	+20.0%	0.65	46.2/km^{2}
Phillips Grove	Organized hamlet	15	15	0.0%	0.31	48.4/km^{2}
Piapot	Dissolved municipality	40	50	−20.0%	0.74	54.1/km^{2}
Potato Lake	Cluster subdivision	43	45	−4.4%	1.6	26.9/km^{2}
Powm Beach	Organized hamlet	59	37	+59.5%	0.46	128.3/km^{2}
Prairie River	Organized hamlet	70	55	+27.3%	0.16	437.5/km^{2}
Prince	Organized hamlet	37	50	−26.0%	0.66	56.1/km^{2}
Ramsey Bay	Resort subdivision	159	79	+101.3%	0.52	305.8/km^{2}
Riceton	Organized hamlet	33	61	−45.9%	0.61	54.1/km^{2}
Robsart	Dissolved municipality	15	20	−25.0%	1.67	9.0/km^{2}
Rockhaven	Dissolved municipality	15	10	+50.0%	1.52	9.9/km^{2}
Runnymede	Organized hamlet	20	30	−33.3%	0.24	83.3/km^{2}
Ruthilda	Dissolved municipality	10	5	+100.0%	0.69	14.5/km^{2}
Sarnia Beach	Organized hamlet	37	15	+146.7%	0.16	231.3/km^{2}
Scout Lake	Organized hamlet	10	10	0.0%	0.35	28.6/km^{2}
Shackleton	Dissolved municipality	5	10	−50.0%	0.72	6.9/km^{2}
Shipman	Organized hamlet	5	10	−50.0%	0.37	13.5/km^{2}
Simmie	Organized hamlet	25	41	−39.0%	0.15	166.7/km^{2}
Sled Lake	Northern settlement	24	10	+140.0%	1.97	12.2/km^{2}
Sleepy Hollow	Organized hamlet	29	18	+61.1%	0.04	725.0/km^{2}
Snowden	Organized hamlet	15	20	−25.0%	0.1	150.0/km^{2}
Sorenson's Beach	Organized hamlet	44	33	+33.3%	0.17	258.8/km^{2}
Sovereign	Dissolved municipality	40	25	+60.0%	1.12	35.7/km^{2}
Spring Bay	Organized hamlet	20	10	+100.0%	0.22	90.9/km^{2}
Springwater	Dissolved municipality	10	10	0.0%	0.67	14.9/km^{2}
Spruce Bay	Organized hamlet	15	20	−25.0%	0.14	107.1/km^{2}
Spruce Lake	Dissolved municipality	42	55	−23.6%	0.63	66.7/km^{2}
St. Isidore-de-Bellevue	Organized hamlet	154	152	+1.3%	0.22	700.0/km^{2}
St. Joseph's	Organized hamlet	130	131	−0.8%	0.36	361.1/km^{2}
St. Victor	Dissolved municipality	25	20	+25.0%	0.24	104.2/km^{2}
Stanley Mission	Northern settlement	104	95	+9.5%	0.28	371.4/km^{2}
Summerfield Beach	Organized hamlet	44	43	+2.3%	0.33	133.3/km^{2}
Sunset Beach	Organized hamlet	61	38	+60.5%	0.21	290.5/km^{2}
Sunset View Beach	Dissolved municipality	133	74	+79.7%	1	133.0/km^{2}
Swan Plain	Organized hamlet	5	15	−66.7%	0.2	25.0/km^{2}
Sylvania	Organized hamlet	52	57	−8.8%	0.32	162.5/km^{2}
Tadmore	Organized hamlet	20	20	0.0%	0.26	76.9/km^{2}
Taylor Beach	Organized hamlet	48	58	−17.2%	0.37	129.7/km^{2}
Trevessa Beach	Organized hamlet	52	60	−13.3%	0.19	273.7/km^{2}
Trossachs	Organized hamlet	50	42	+19.0%	0.36	138.9/km^{2}
Tuffnell	Organized hamlet	5	15	−66.7%	0.17	29.4/km^{2}
Turtle Lake South Bay	Organized hamlet	61	41	+48.8%	0.36	169.4/km^{2}
Tway	Organized hamlet	5	5	0.0%	0.2	25.0/km^{2}
Uhl's Bay	Organized hamlet	20	5	+300.0%	1.15	17.4/km^{2}
Uranium City	Northern settlement	91	73	+24.7%	5.99	15.2/km^{2}
Usherville	Organized hamlet	5	0	NA	0.12	41.7/km^{2}
Vawn	Dissolved municipality	20	49	−59.2%	0.6	33.3/km^{2}
Veregin	Dissolved municipality	47	45	+4.4%	1.46	32.2/km^{2}
Viceroy	Dissolved municipality	25	20	+25.0%	1.14	21.9/km^{2}
West Chatfield Beach	Organized hamlet	29	23	+26.1%	0.1	290.0/km^{2}
Westview	Organized hamlet	53	45	+17.8%	0.39	135.9/km^{2}
White Bear	Organized hamlet	25	10	+150.0%	0.24	104.2/km^{2}
Willowbrook	Dissolved municipality	30	37	−18.9%	0.46	65.2/km^{2}
Wishart	Dissolved municipality	50	70	−28.6%	0.66	75.8/km^{2}
Wollaston Lake	Northern settlement	96	104	−7.7%	1.45	66.2/km^{2}
Woodrow	Dissolved municipality	20	58	−65.5%	0.54	37.0/km^{2}
Wymark	Organized hamlet	148	138	+7.2%	0.32	462.5/km^{2}
Yellow Creek	Dissolved municipality	35	45	−22.2%	0.52	67.3/km^{2}
Total designated places	—	11,858	11,098	+6.8%	119.87	98.9/km^{2}
Province of Saskatchewan	—	1,132,505	1,098,352	+3.1%	577,060.40	2.0/km^{2}

== See also ==
- List of census agglomerations in Saskatchewan
- List of cities in Saskatchewan
- List of communities in Saskatchewan
- List of ghost towns in Saskatchewan
- List of hamlets in Saskatchewan
- List of Indian reserves in Saskatchewan
- List of municipalities in Saskatchewan
- List of population centres in Saskatchewan
- List of resort villages in Saskatchewan
- List of rural municipalities in Saskatchewan
- List of towns in Saskatchewan
- List of villages in Saskatchewan
