= Brightsand Lake =

Lake in Saskatchewan, Canada

- Location in Saskatchewan Brightsand Lake (Canada)
- Location: RM of Mervin No. 499,Saskatchewan
- Coordinates: 53.6001°N 108.8840°W
- Part of: Saskatchewan River drainage basin
- Primary outflows: Brightsand Creek
- Basin countries: Canada
- Surface area: 4,560.7 ha (11,270 acres)
- Max. depth: 14.7 m (48 ft)
- Shore length^{1}: 27.2 km (16.9 mi)
- Surface elevation: 652 m (2,139 ft)
- ^{1} Shore length is not a well-defined measure.

Brightsand Lake is a lake in the Canadian Province of Saskatchewan. It is in the Rural Municipality of Mervin No. 499 in the west-central part of the province in the aspen parkland ecoregion. Brightsand Creek — located on the western side of the lake — is the outflow and it flows in a southerly direction into Turtlelake River, which is a tributary of the North Saskatchewan River. Turtle Lake is about 9.5 kilometres (5.9 mi) to the east and the Meadow Lake Escarpment is to the north-east.

There are several communities and a regional park dotted around its shores. At the southern end of the lake is Crystal Bay-Sunset and Thunderchild Indian Reserve 115Z; along the eastern shore is Evergreen Beach, Mowrey Beach, and Lakeshore Estates subdivision; and Brightsand Lake Regional Park is at the northern end. Access to the lake is from Highways 795 and 796.

== Brightsand Lake Regional Park ==
Brightsand Lake Regional Park (53.6436°N 108.8458°W) is a 1,600-acre park about 27 kilometres (17 mi) east of the town of St. Walburg on the northern end of Brightsand Lake. Though it was founded in 1965, the area has been a popular place for vacationers since the early 1900s because of its clear water and mile-long sandy beach. The park is accessed off of Highway 795.

Amenities and attractions at Brightsand Regional Park include camping, golfing, mini golf, 28 kilometres of hiking trails, a boat launch, concession, a playground, fishing, and swimming.

The campground has 106 individual campsites and 17 group campsites. All of the group sites are electric and about half the individual sites are electric. There are also two modern cabins for rent. At the campground there's a shower house, washrooms, and a sani-dump.

The golf course is a par 37, 9-hole, sand greens course. The men's tees total 2,860 yards and the ladies' total 2,608.

Brightsand Regional Park has won Saskatchewan's Park of the Year Award twice, first in 2015 and again in 2026.

== Fish species ==
Fish species commonly found in the lake include are northern pike, white sucker, rainbow trout, walleye, and yellow perch.

== See also ==
- List of lakes of Saskatchewan
- List of protected areas of Saskatchewan
- Tourism in Saskatchewan
