= Turtleford =

Town in Saskatchewan, Canada

- Town
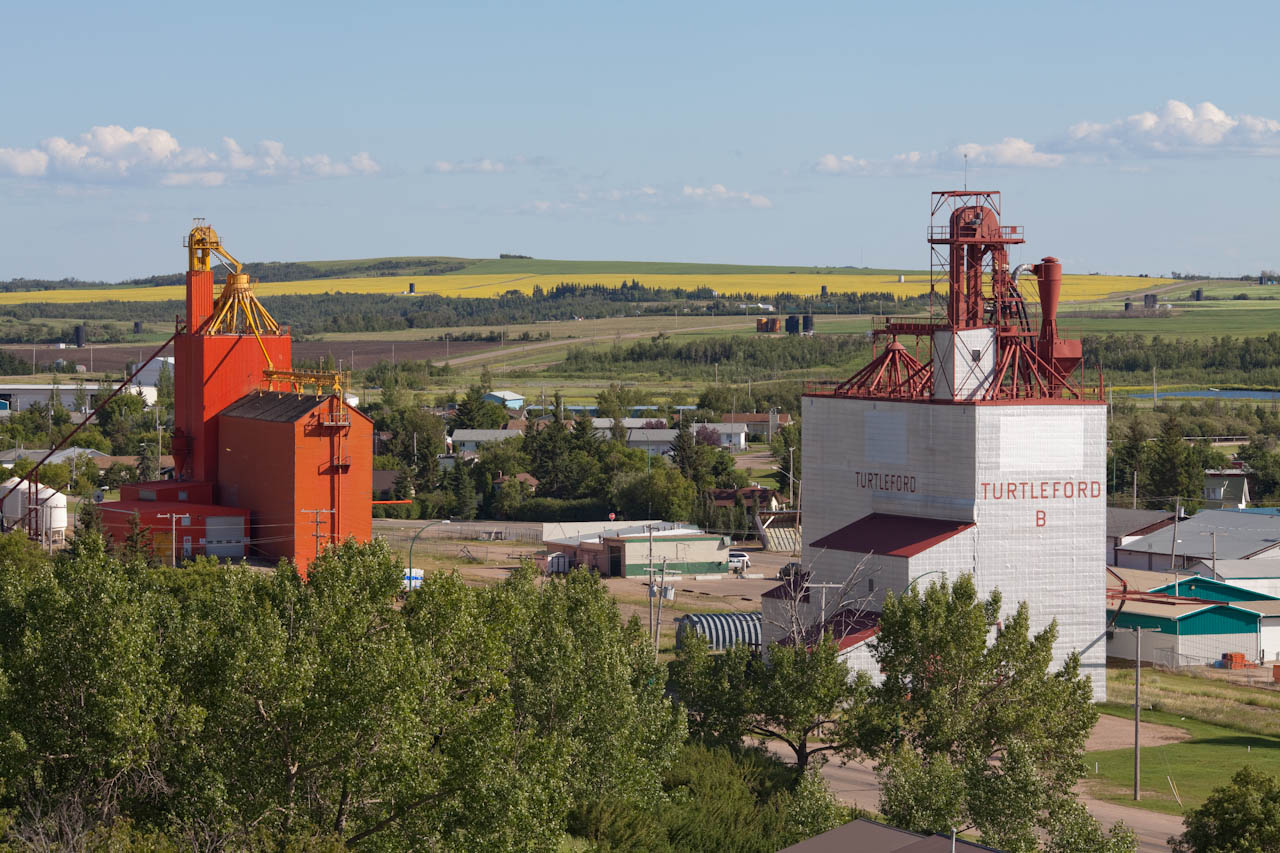

- Location of Turtleford in Saskatchewan Turtleford (Canada)
- Coordinates: 53°23′N 108°57′W
- Country: Canada
- Province: Saskatchewan
- Rural municipalities (RM): Mervin No. 499
- Post office Founded: 1913-12-01
- Town: July 1, 1983

Government
  - Mayor: Milne, Doug(2024)
  - MLA of Cut Knife-Turtleford: Larry Doke
  - MP of Battlefords—Lloydminster: Rosemarie Falk

Area
  - Total: 1.69 km^{2} (0.65 sq mi)

Population (2011)
  - Total: 525
  - Density: 311.6/km^{2} (807/sq mi)
- Time zone: UTC−6 (Central Standard Time)
  - Summer (DST): UTC−5
- Postal code: S0M 2Y0
- Highways: Highway 26 / Highway 3 / Highway 301
- Website: Official Website

Turtleford is a town in the Rural Municipality of Mervin No. 499, in the Canadian province of Saskatchewan. Turtleford is located on Highway 26 near the intersection / concurrency with Highway 3 and Highway 303. The nearest cities are North Battleford and Lloydminster. The Turtlelake River runs through Turtleford, and nearby are Brightsand Lake and Turtle Lake.

Turtleford has Canada's largest turtle statue (more than eight feet tall), named Ernie. "Ernie the Turtle" is on Highway 26 near the south edge of town.

A small vulnerable songbird called Sprague's pipit has a breeding range in the northern Great Plains of North America, and amongst their breeding spots is Turtleford, Saskatchewan.

== History ==
First settled in 1907 and 1908 the town was named for its proximity to the early river crossing (or ford) on the Turtlelake River. A post office opened in 1913 and by 1914 the ongoing extension of a Canadian Northern Railway (CNoR) branch from North Battleford had reached Turtleford. By 1915 dozens of businesses had opened and Turtleford became a major centre for the area population.

The North Battleford — Turtleford Branch of the CNoR (later merged into Canadian National Railway), which primarily serviced the grain elevators used by the farmers northwest of North Battleford, ceased operation by 2005, when the remaining elevators closed. The branch had served Hamlin, Prince, Meota (1910 extension), Cavalier, Vawn, Edam, Mervin and Turtleford, and had been extended farther northwest to Cleeves, Spruce Lake, St. Walburg (1919 extension), with a fork to Paradise Hill and Frenchman Butte. The rail line and Saskatchewan Highway 26 ran beside each other from Prince to St. Walburg.

== Demographics ==
In the 2021 Census of Population conducted by Statistics Canada, Turtleford had a population of 503 living in 213 of its 228 total private dwellings, a change of 1.4% from its 2016 population of 496. With a land area of 1.66 km^{2} (0.64 sq mi), it had a population density of 303.0/km^{2} (784.8/sq mi) in 2021.

Canada census – Turtleford community profile

	2011
Population	525 (+13.9% from 2006)
Land area	1.69 km^{2} (0.65 sq mi)
Population density	311.6/km^{2} (807/sq mi)
Median age	40.9 (M: 36.5, F: 43.0)
Private dwellings	227 (total)
Median household income

References: 2011

== Education ==
Turtleford (Turtleford Community School) belongs to Turtleford School Division #65 a part of Northwest School Division. Turtleford is served by Lakeland Library Region — Turtleford Branch

== Media ==
- Turtleford is served by The Northwest News weekly newspaper

== Notable people ==
- Eric B. Rosendahl, Member of the Legislative Assembly of Alberta for West Yellowhead, May 5, 2015 – March 19, 2019

== See also ==
- List of towns in Saskatchewan
- List of francophone communities in Saskatchewan
