= St. Walburg, Saskatchewan =

Town in Saskatchewan, Canada

St. Walburg
- Town
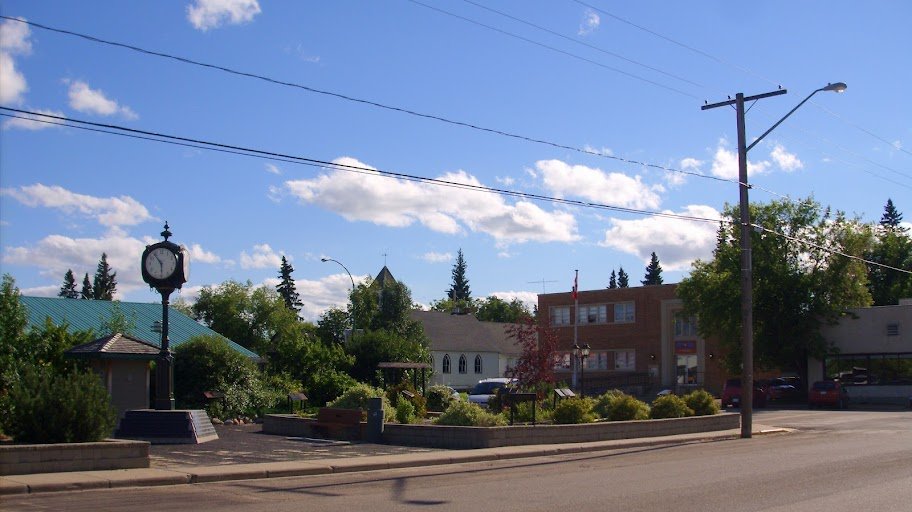
- View of St. Walburg

- Location within Saskatchewan Location within Canada
- Coordinates: 53.6335°N 109.2006°W
- Country: Canada
- Province: Saskatchewan
- Census division: Division No. 17
- Post office Founded: 1915

Government
  - Mayor: Nancy Schneider
  - Administrator: Christine Seguin
  - MLA Constituency of Meadow Lake: Jeremy Harrison
  - MP Battlefords—Lloydminster: Rosemarie Falk

Area
  - Total: 2.12 km^{2} (0.82 sq mi)

Population (2011)
  - Total: 716
  - Density: 338/km^{2} (880/sq mi)
- Time zone: UTC−6 (CST)
- Postal code: S0M 2T0
- Area code: 306
- Highways: Highway 26
- Website: stwalburg.ca

St. Walburg is a town in west-central Saskatchewan's prairie region on Highway 26. St. Walburg is surrounded by the Rural Municipality of Frenchman Butte No. 501. The Bronson Provincial Forest is about 10 kilometres (6.2 mi) to the north.

The community is named for the wife of the first postmaster, but also to honour Saint Walpurga, an eighth-century English nun educated by the Benedictines, who was canonized for a life dedicated to evangelical work among the German people.

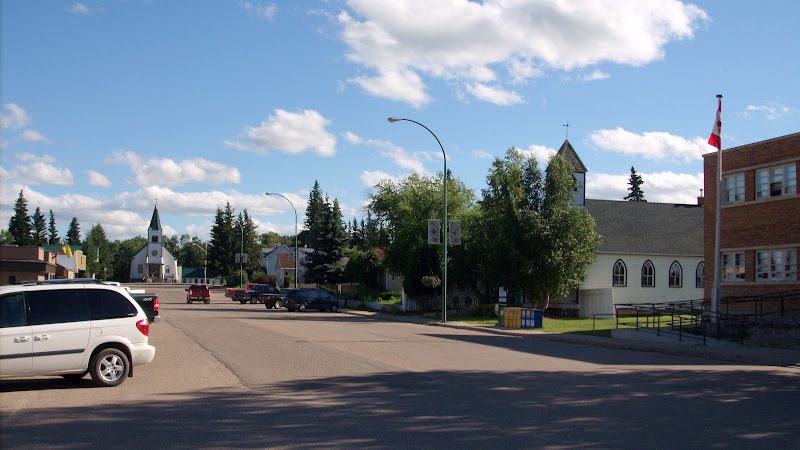
Central area of St. Walburg

== History ==
The town and surrounding area were originally settled by Germans between the 1910s and 1930s, with a few Polish, Ukrainian, and French settlers arriving later.

The Canadian Northern Railway (CNoR) continued the extension of its northwest branch line from North Battleford, reaching St. Walburg in 1919. This caused a boom in the area, with many homesteaders arriving within months, now able to deliver their production to the grain elevators at St. Walburg. The branch had served Hamlin, Prince, Meota (1910 extension), Cavalier, Vawn, Edam, Mervin, Turtleford (1914 extension), Cleeves, Spruce Lake and St. Walburg, with a fork to Paradise Hill and Frenchman Butte. Later the rail line and Highway 26 ran beside each other from Prince to St. Walburg. The Canadian National Railway abandoned the entire branch line in 2005, when the remaining grain elevators closed. The line was officially abandoned in 2008.

== Demographics ==
In the 2021 Census of Population conducted by Statistics Canada, St. Walburg had a population of 591 living in 276 of its 331 total private dwellings, a change of −14.2% from its 2016 population of 689. With a land area of 2.02 km^{2} (0.78 sq mi), it had a population density of 292.6/km^{2} (757.8/sq mi) in 2021.

Canada census – St. Walburg, Saskatchewan community profile

	2011
Population	716 (+6.5% from 2006)
Land area	2.12 km^{2} (0.82 sq mi)
Population density	338.0/km^{2} (875/sq mi)
Median age	40.4 (M: 38.1, F: 43.8)
Private dwellings	336 (total)
Median household income

References: 2011

== Economy ==
The main industries are grain and cattle farming. The oil and natural gas industries have become increasingly important in the area.

== Notable people ==
- Count Berthold von Imhoff (1868–1939) an artist known for his religious murals and paintings homesteaded southwest of St. Walburg in 1914. In 1937 he was awarded a knighthood in the Pontifical Order of St. Gregory the Great by Pope Pius XI. He is buried in the St. Walburg Cemetery next to his wife Matilda. The Imhoff Museum (the home, studio and farm of Imhoff) was designated a Saskatchewan Heritage Property in 1993.
- Cal Nichols, former chairman of the Edmonton Oilers Hockey Club.
- Lucien Larré(1932–2026), Catholic Priest

== See also ==
- List of towns in Saskatchewan
- List of francophone communities in Saskatchewan
