= Midnight Lake =

Lake in Saskatchewan, Canada

- Location in Saskatchewan Midnight Lake (Canada)
- Location: RM of Parkdale No. 498, Saskatchewan
- Coordinates: 53.5001°N 108.3507°W
- Part of: North Saskatchewan River drainage basin
- River sources: Meadow Lake Escarpment
- Primary outflows: Dewan Creek
- Basin countries: Canada
- Max. length: 9.2 km (5.7 mi)
- Max. width: 500 m (1,600 ft)
- Surface area: 2,433 ha (6,010 acres)
- Shore length^{1}: 28 km (17 mi)
- Settlements: None
- ^{1} Shore length is not a well-defined measure.

Midnight Lake is a lake in the Canadian province of Saskatchewan about 70 kilometres (43 mi) south of the city of Meadow Lake. It is also south of the Meadow Lake Escarpment, which is a plateau that separates the Saskatchewan and Churchill River drainage basins. The lake sits in the transition zone between the boreal forest and aspen parkland ecozones and is at the centre of an Important Bird Area (IBA) of Canada. Access is from Highway 4

Midnight Lake is fed by several small streams that flow in from the surrounding hills. From the south end of the lake, Dewan Creek flows out in a westerly direction. It empties into Stony Lake, which is connected to Turtle Lake by Warner River. To the east of Midnight Lake are Helene and Birch Lakes. The community of Midnight Lake is located near the southern tip of the lake and the hamlet of Helena Lake is near the eastern shore, close to Helene Lake. The village of Glaslyn is about 12 kilometres (7.5 mi) to the south and Saulteaux 159EE Indian reserve is to the north.

== Midnight Lake IBA ==
The Midnight Lake (SK 087) IBA covers a total of 130.05 km^{2} (50.21 sq mi). It is an important habitat for staging whooping cranes in both the spring and autumn migration.

== See also ==
- List of lakes of Saskatchewan
- List of protected areas of Saskatchewan
