= Turtlelake River =

River in Saskatchewan, Canada

Turtlelake River Turtle River
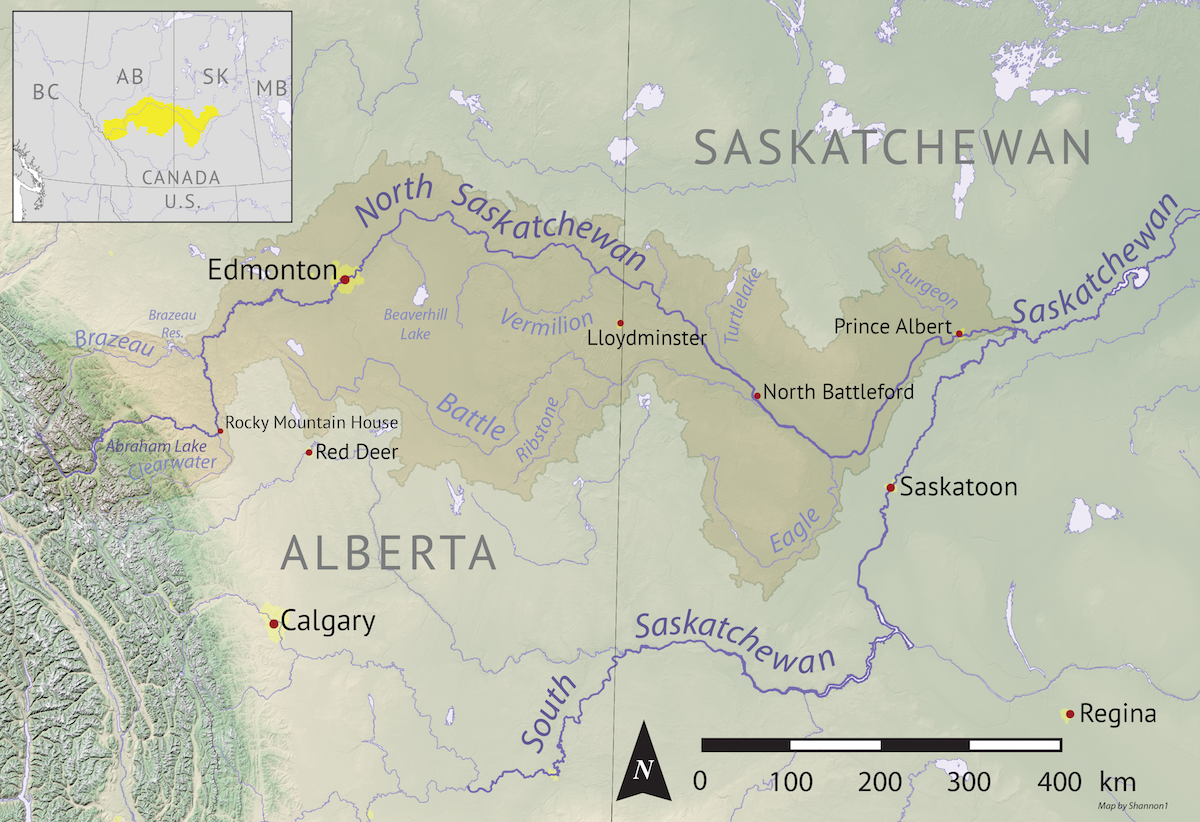
- The North Saskatchewan River drainage basin

- Location of river's mouth in Saskatchewan Turtlelake River (Canada)

Location
- Country: Canada
- Province: Saskatchewan

Physical characteristics
- Source: Turtle Lake
  - location: RM of Mervin No. 499
  - coordinates: 53.5155°N 108.7079°W
  - elevation: 649 m (2,129 ft)
- Mouth: North Saskatchewan River
  - location: RM of Turtle River No. 469
  - coordinates: 52.9479°N 108.5667°W

Basin features
- River system: Saskatchewan River
- Tributaries
  - left: Warner River; Crawford Creek
  - right: Bightsand Creek

Turtlelake River, also known as Turtle River, is a river in the Canadian province of Saskatchewan. It runs in a southerly direction from the southern end of Turtle Lake to the North Saskatchewan River across from Delmas. The town of Turtleford is the only sizeable community along the river's course.

== Description ==
Turtleford River begins at the community of Turtle Lake South Bay at the southern end of Turtle Lake in the Rural Municipality of Mervin No. 499. At the source, Turtle Lake South Bay is on one side of the river and the 10-acre Turtle River Campground is on the other. From the lake, the river flows south-west through the Thunderchild 115B Indian reserve where it is met by Brightsand Creek (which originates at Brightsand Lake) to the town of Turtleford. At Turtleford, Turtlelake River turns south towards the Rural Municipality of Turtle River No. 469 and the North Saskatchewan River. It meets the North Saskatchewan across from Delmas, near the Michaud Islands.

Highways 26, 303, 674, and 795 cross Turtlelake River.

== See also ==
- List of rivers of Saskatchewan
- Hudson Bay drainage basin
