= Saskatchewan Highway 303 =

Provincial highway in Saskatchewan, Canada

Highway 303

Route information
- Maintained by Ministry of Highways and Infrastructure
- Length: 82.2 km (51.1 mi)

Major junctions
- West end: Highway 16 (TCH/YH) near Lloydminster
- Highway 21 in McLaren
- East end: Highway 26 in Turtleford

Location
- Country: Canada
- Province: Saskatchewan
- Rural municipalities: Britannia, Wilton, Eldon, Frenchman Butte, Mervin

Highway system
- Provincial highways in Saskatchewan
← Highway 302	→ Highway 304

Highway 303 is a provincial highway in the Canadian province of Saskatchewan. It runs from Highway 16, approximately 1.7 kilometres (1.1 mi) east of Lloydminster city limits, to Highway 26 in Turtleford. It is about 82 kilometres (51 mi) long.

== Route description ==
Hwy 303 begins in the Rural Municipality of Wilton No. 472 at an intersection with the Yellowhead Highway (Hwy 16) on the eastern outskirts of Lloydminster, curving due eastward to run along the Rural Municipality of Britannia No. 502 boundary for several kilometres, where it has an intersection with Hwy 688 / Range Road 3265 near Big Gully Municipal Park, before crossing Big Gully Creek, and curving back south into Wilton No. 472. Running parallel to the north bank of the creek, the highway shares a short concurrency (overlap) with Hwy 675 and enters the Rural Municipality of Eldon No. 471, having a junction with Hwy 684 before becoming concurrent with northbound Hwy 21 at the locality of McLaren, just north of Silver Lake Regional Park. The pair head north through Milleton to cross the Toby Nollet Bridge over the North Saskatchewan River into the Rural Municipality of Frenchman Butte No. 501.

Upon crossing the river, Hwy 303 splits off and heads east to pass a Carlton Trail historical marker and cross the Englishman River just south of Englishman Lake before having an intersection with Range Road 3221, which leads south to Westhazel, and entering the Rural Municipality of Mervin No. 499. The highway travels through rural farmland for a few kilometres to cross the Turtlelake River and enter the town of Turtleford, running along 1st Street S on the southern edge of downtown to cross the remains of a former railway and come to an end at an intersection with Hwy 26, just across the street from the Ernie the Turtle statue. The entire length of Hwy 303 is a paved, two-lane highway.

== Major intersections ==
From west to east:

Rural municipality	Location	km	mi	Destinations	Notes
Wilton No. 472	Lloydminster	0.0	0.0	Highway 16 (TCH/YH) – Lloydminster, The Battlefords	Western terminus
Britannia No. 502 – Wilton No. 472 line		14.3	8.9	Highway 688 south – Marshall; Range Road 3265 – Big Gully Municipal Park, Fish & Game / Lloyd Archers Youth Centre	
Wilton No. 472		16.6	10.3	Bridge over Big Gully Creek	
Wilton No. 472		21.1	13.1	Range Road 3255	Former Highway 675 north
Wilton No. 472		22.7	14.1	Highway 675 south – Lashburn	
Eldon No. 471		30.8	19.1	Highway 684 – Waseca	
Eldon No. 471	McLaren	44.4	27.6	Highway 21 south – Maidstone	West end of Highway 21 concurrency
↑ / ↓		57.5	35.7	Toby Nollet Bridge over the North Saskatchewan River	
Frenchman Butte No. 501		59.3	36.8	Highway 21 north – St. Walburg, Paradise Hill	East end of Highway 21 concurrency
Frenchman Butte No. 501		68.3	42.4	Bridge over the Englishman River	
Mervin No. 499	Turtleford	81.6	50.7	Bridge over the Turtlelake River	
Mervin No. 499	Turtleford	82.2	51.1	Highway 26 to Highway 3 – St. Walburg, Glaslyn, The Battlefords	Eastern terminus
1.000 mi = 1.609 km; 1.000 km = 0.621 mi: Concurrency terminus

== See also ==
- Transportation in Saskatchewan
- Roads in Saskatchewan
