= Rural Municipality of Turtle River No. 469 =

Rural municipality in Saskatchewan, Canada

Turtle River No. 469
- Rural municipality
- Rural Municipality of Turtle River No. 469
- Location of the RM of Turtle River No. 469 in Saskatchewan
- Coordinates: 53.134°N 108.849°W
- Country: Canada
- Province: Saskatchewan
- Census division: 17
- SARM division: 6
- Formed: December 9, 1912

Government
  - Reeve: Louis McCaffrey
  - Governing body: RM of Turtle River No. 469 Council
  - Administrator: Rebecca Carr
  - Office location: Edam

Area (2016)
  - Land: 664.44 km^{2} (256.54 sq mi)

Population (2016)
  - Total: 344
  - Density: 0.5/km^{2} (1.3/sq mi)
- Time zone: CST
  - Summer (DST): CST
- Area codes: 306 and 639
- Website: Official website

The Rural Municipality of Turtle River No. 469 (2016 population: 344) is a rural municipality (RM) in the Canadian province of Saskatchewan within Census Division No. 17 and SARM Division No. 6.

== History ==
The RM of Turtle River No. 469 incorporated as a rural municipality on December 9, 1912. The RM's name is taken from the Turtle River, which outlets from Turtle Lake and drains into the North Saskatchewan River near the Michaud Islands, across the river from Delmas.

== Geography ==
=== Communities and localities ===
The following urban municipalities are surrounded by the RM.

Villages

- Edam

The following unincorporated communities are within the RM.

Localities

- Dulwich
- St. Hippolyte
- Vawn

== Demographics ==
Population history (1981–2016)
Year	Pop.	±%
1981	441	—
1986	450	+2.0%
1991	409	−9.1%
1996	374	−8.6%
2001	358	−4.3%
2006	336	−6.1%
2011	360	+7.1%
2016	344	−4.4%
Source: Statistics Canada via Saskatchewan Bureau of Statistics

In the 2021 Census of Population conducted by Statistics Canada, the RM of Turtle River No. 469 had a population of 307 living in 117 of its 133 total private dwellings, a change of −9.4% from its 2016 population of 339. With a land area of 655.72 km^{2} (253.17 sq mi), it had a population density of 0.5/km^{2} (1.2/sq mi) in 2021.

In the 2016 Census of Population, the RM of Turtle River No. 469 recorded a population of 344 living in 129 of its 150 total private dwellings, a −4.4% change from its 2011 population of 360. With a land area of 664.44 km^{2} (256.54 sq mi), it had a population density of 0.5/km^{2} (1.3/sq mi) in 2016.

== Attractions ==
- Washbrook Museum

== Government ==
The RM of Turtle River No. 469 is governed by an elected municipal council and an appointed administrator that meets on the second Wednesday of every month. The reeve of the RM is Louis McCaffrey while its administrator is Rebecca Carr. The RM's office is located in Edam.

== Transportation ==
- Saskatchewan Highway 26 (parallels the North Saskatchewan River through much of the RM)
- Saskatchewan Highway 674
- Saskatchewan Highway 769
- Canadian National Railway
- Paynton Ferry
- Edam Airport

== See also ==
- List of rural municipalities in Saskatchewan
