= Saskatchewan Highway 304 =

Provincial highway in Saskatchewan, Canada

Highway 304

Route information
- Maintained by Ministry of Highways and Infrastructure
- Length: 48.5 km (30.1 mi)

Major junctions
- West end: Highway 26 near Loon Lake
- East end: Highway 4 / Highway 799 near Meadow Lake

Location
- Country: Canada
- Province: Saskatchewan
- Rural municipalities: Loon Lake, Meadow Lake

Highway system
- Provincial highways in Saskatchewan
← Highway 303	→ Highway 305

Highway 304 is a provincial highway in the Canadian province of Saskatchewan. It runs from Hwy 26 just south of Loon Lake to Hwy 4 and Hwy 799 just south of Meadow Lake, passing through the towns of Makwa and Morin Creek. It is about 49 kilometres (30 mi) long.

== Route description ==
Hwy 304 begins in the Rural Municipality of Loon Lake No. 561 at an intersection with Hwy 26 just of the town of Loon Lake, on the western shore of Nichols Lake. It heads east through farmland, crossing Horse Head Creek before travelling straight through the centre of the village of Makwa along Main Street. The highway crosses Rabbit Creek before going through a switchback and passing through the hamlet of Morin Creek. After crossing the creek of the same name, Hwy 304 enters the Rural Municipality of Meadow Lake No. 588 and takes a northeast jog through the woodlands of Nesset Lake Recreation Site as it travels just to the south of Nesset Lake. Now turning back eastward, the highway travels through rural farmland for several kilometres, crossing several small streams to come an end at the intersection between Hwy 4 and the western end of Hwy 799 just south the town of Meadow Lake. The entire length of Hwy 304 is a paved, two-lane highway.

== Major intersections ==
From west to east:

Rural municipality	Location	km	mi	Destinations	Notes
Loon Lake No. 561		0.0	0.0	Highway 26 – St. Walburg, Loon Lake, Goodsoil	Western terminus
Meadow Lake No. 588		48.5	30.1	Highway 4 – Meadow Lake, Glaslyn Highway 799 east (Cabana Road) – Cabana	Eastern terminus; western terminus of Hwy 799; road continues east as Hwy 799
1.000 mi = 1.609 km; 1.000 km = 0.621 mi

== See also ==
- Transportation in Saskatchewan
- Roads in Saskatchewan
