= Helena Lake =

Community in Saskatchewan, Canada

Coordinates: 53°30′00″N 108°15′02″W

Helena Lake is a hamlet in the Rural Municipality of Parkdale No. 498 in the Canadian province of Saskatchewan. It is situated between Midnight and Helene Lakes.
