= Parkland Beach =

Parkland Beach may refer to:

- Parkland Beach, Alberta
- Parkland Beach, Saskatchewan
