= Sunset View Beach =

Organized hamlet in Saskatchewan, Canada

- Organized hamlet
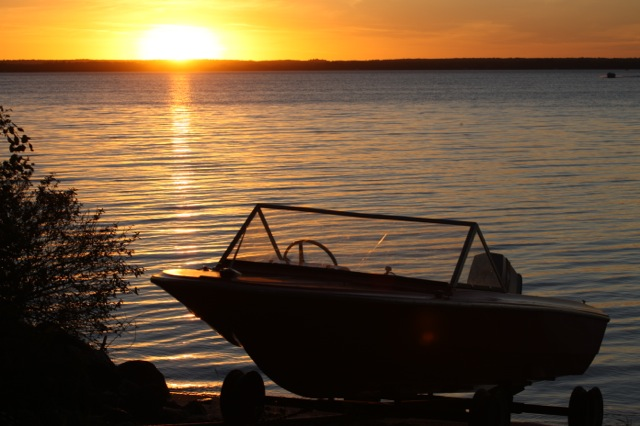
- Sunset over Turtle Lake at Sunset View Beach

- Location within Saskatchewan Location within Canada
- Coordinates: 53.550°N 108.636°W
- Country: Canada
- Province: Saskatchewan
- Census division: 17
- Rural municipality: Mervin No. 499
- Incorporated (resort village): September 1, 1992
- Dissolved (organized hamlet): January 1, 2005

Government
  - Board chair: Ray Fenrich
  - Governing body: Hamlet Board
  - Board members: Jason Krueckl; Gerald Nickel

Area (2016)
  - Land: 0.80 km^{2} (0.31 sq mi)

Population (2016)
  - Total: 74
  - Density: 92.5/km^{2} (240/sq mi)
- Time zone: CST
  - Summer (DST): CST
- Area codes: 306 and 639
- Highway(s): Highway 697
- Waterway(s): Turtle Lake

Sunset View Beach (2016 population: 74) is an organized hamlet in the Canadian province of Saskatchewan within the RM of Mervin No. 499 and Census Division No. 17. Part of the RM of Parkdale No. 498 prior to September 1992, it subsequently held resort village status until it dissolved to become part of the RM of Mervin No. 499 in January 2015. Sunset View Beach is on the southeast shore of Turtle Lake, approximately 43 kilometres (27 mi) northeast of the town of Turtleford and 102 kilometres (63 mi) north of the city of North Battleford.

== History ==
Sunset View Beach originally incorporated as a resort village on September 1, 1992. Prior to incorporation it was part of the RM of Parkdale No. 498. Sunset View Beach subsequently dissolved on January 1, 2005, becoming an organized hamlet under the jurisdiction of the RM of Mervin No. 499.

== Demographics ==
Population history (1991–2006)
Year	Pop.	±%
1991	22	—
1996	32	+45.5%
2001	35	+9.4%
2006	43	+22.9%
2011	61	+41.9%
2016	74	+21.3%
Source: Statistics Canada

In the 2021 Census of Population conducted by Statistics Canada, Sunset View Beach had a population of 133 living in 71 of its 243 total private dwellings, a change of 79.7% from its 2016 population of 74. With a land area of 1 km^{2} (0.39 sq mi), it had a population density of 133.0/km^{2} (344.5/sq mi) in 2021.

== Government ==
While Sunset View Beach is under the jurisdiction of the RM of Mervin No. 499, it has a three-person hamlet board that is chaired by Ray Fenrich.

== See also ==
- List of communities in Saskatchewan
- List of municipalities in Saskatchewan
- List of resort villages in Saskatchewan
