= Edam, Saskatchewan =

Village in Saskatchewan, Canada

Edam
- Village
- Village of Edam
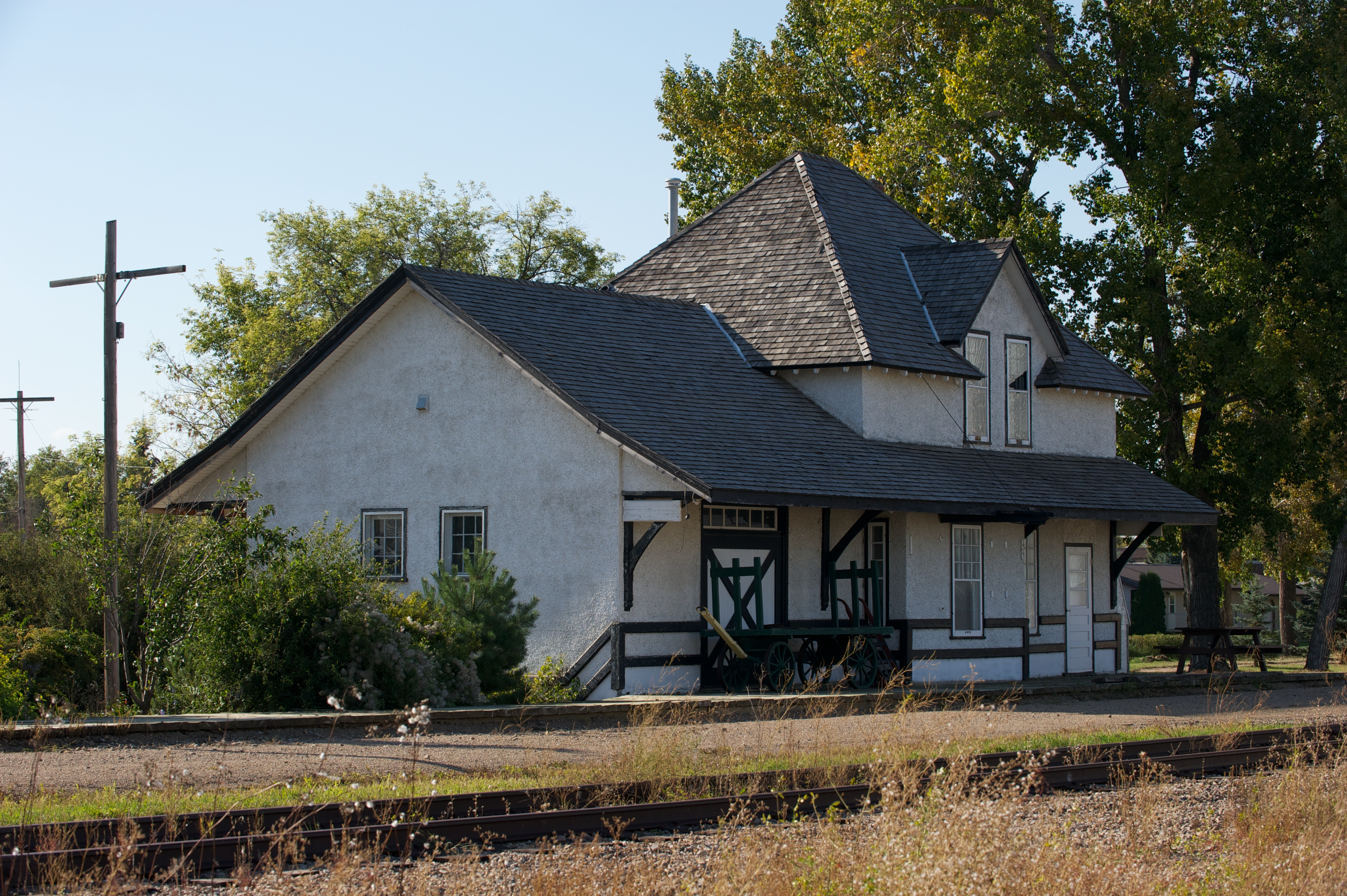
- The 1912 Canadian Northern railway station in Edam, designated a Historic Place in 1981
- Motto: Little piece of Holland in Saskatchewan
- Location of Edam in Saskatchewan Edam (Canada)
- Coordinates: 53°11′17″N 108°46′06″W
- Country: Canada
- Province: Saskatchewan
- Region: Central
- Census division: 17
- Rural Municipality: Turtle River No. 469
- Post office Founded: 1908
- Village: 1911

Government
  - Type: Municipal
  - Governing body: Edam Village Council
  - Mayor: Larry McDaid
  - MLA: Larry Doke
  - MP: Rosemarie Falk

Area
  - Total: 1.19 km^{2} (0.46 sq mi)

Population (2016)
  - Total: 480
  - Density: 403.4/km^{2} (1,045/sq mi)
- Time zone: UTC−6 (Central Standard Time)
  - Summer (DST): UTC−5
- Postal code: S0M 0V0
- Highways: Highway 26 Highway 674 Highway 769
- Railways: Canadian National Railway
- Website: Village of Edam

Edam (2016 population: 480) is a village in the Canadian province of Saskatchewan within the Rural Municipality of Turtle River No. 469 and Census Division No. 17. Edam is located off Highway 26, south of Turtleford and north of Vawn.

The village is known as a "Little piece of Holland in Saskatchewan". Established in 1907, the then unincorporated hamlet was named for the city of Edam, Netherlands, after the name 'Amsterdam' was rejected by the Saskatchewan Government Office as "too long".

== History ==
Edam incorporated as a village on October 12, 1911.

The location was chosen to take advantage of the Canadian Northern Railway (CNoR) line running through that site, with the Edam CNoR railway station completed in 1912. The CNoR merged into the Canadian National Railway in 1923; the station was recognized as a Municipal Heritage Property by Saskatchewan, and added to the Canadian Register of Historic Places, in March 2008.

Three years after completion of the railway station, Chinese immigrant Charlie Chan opened a two storey building housing a café on the main floor and hotel rooms on the second floor. The businesses closed in 1986, and the Edam Café building was recognized as a Municipal Heritage Property by Saskatchewan, and added to the Canadian Register of Historic Places, in June 2005.

== Demographics ==
Population history (1981–2021)
| Year | Pop. | ±% |
|---|---|---|
| 1981 | 384 | — |
| 1986 | 440 | +14.6% |
| 1991 | 425 | −3.4% |
| 1996 | 398 | −6.4% |
| 2001 | 429 | +7.8% |
| 2006 | 399 | −7.0% |
| 2011 | 444 | +11.3% |
| 2016 | 480 | +8.1% |
| 2021 | 476 | −0.8% |
Source: Statistics Canada via Saskatchewan Bureau of Statistics

In the 2021 Census of Population conducted by Statistics Canada, Edam had a population of 476 living in 199 of its 234 total private dwellings, a change of −0.8% from its 2016 population of 480. With a land area of 1.14 km^{2} (0.44 sq mi), it had a population density of 417.5/km^{2} (1,081.4/sq mi) in 2021.

In the 2016 Census of Population, the Village of Edam recorded a population of 480 living in 179 of its 210 total private dwellings, a 7.5% change from its 2011 population of 444. With a land area of 1.19 km^{2} (0.46 sq mi), it had a population density of 403.4/km^{2} (1,044.7/sq mi) in 2016.

== Notable people ==
- Fiona Smith-Bell, two-time world champion hockey player with the Canadian women's hockey team.
- Wayne Wouters, former Clerk of the Privy Council (the most senior civil servant) in the Government of Canada.

== Transportation ==
- Highway 674
- Paynton Ferry
- Edam Airport

== See also ==
- List of communities in Saskatchewan
- List of francophone communities in Saskatchewan
- List of villages in Saskatchewan
