= Kivimaa-Moonlight Bay =

Resort village in Saskatchewan, Canada

- Resort village
- Resort Village of Kivimaa-Moonlight Bay
- Location within Saskatchewan Location within Canada
- Coordinates: 53.6096°N 108.6628°W
- Country: Canada
- Province: Saskatchewan
- Census division: 17
- Rural municipality: Mervin No. 499
- Incorporated: January 1, 1989

Government
  - Mayor: Steven Nasby
  - Governing body: Resort Village Council
  - Administrator: Jackie Helgeton

Area (2016)
  - Land: 0.55 km^{2} (0.21 sq mi)

Population (2016)
  - Total: 84
  - Density: 152.7/km^{2} (395/sq mi)
- Time zone: CST
  - Summer (DST): CST
- Area codes: 306 and 639
- Waterway(s): Turtle Lake

Kivimaa-Moonlight Bay (2016 population: 84) is a resort village in the Canadian province of Saskatchewan within Census Division No. 17. It is on the shores of Turtle Lake in the Rural Municipality of Mervin No. 499.

== History ==
Kivimaa-Moonlight Bay incorporated as a resort village on January 1, 1989.

== Demographics ==
Population history (1981–2016)
Year	Pop.	±%
1981		—
1986		—
1991	22	—
1996	28	+27.3%
2001	42	+50.0%
2006	81	+92.9%
2011	84	+3.7%
2016	84	+0.0%
Source: Statistics Canada via Saskatchewan Bureau of Statistics

In the 2021 Census of Population conducted by Statistics Canada, Kivimaa-Moonlight Bay had a population of 137 living in 74 of its 256 total private dwellings, a change of 63.1% from its 2016 population of 84. With a land area of 0.57 km^{2} (0.22 sq mi), it had a population density of 240.4/km^{2} (622.5/sq mi) in 2021.

In the 2016 Census of Population conducted by Statistics Canada, the Resort Village of Kivimaa-Moonlight Bay recorded a population of 84 living in 45 of its 238 total private dwellings, a 0% change from its 2011 population of 84. With a land area of 0.55 km^{2} (0.21 sq mi), it had a population density of 152.7/km^{2} (395.6/sq mi) in 2016.

== Government ==
The Resort Village of Kivimaa-Moonlight Bay is governed by an elected municipal council and an appointed administrator that meets on the third Tuesday of every month. The mayor is Steven Nasby and its administrator is Jackie Helgeton.

== See also ==
- List of communities in Saskatchewan
- List of municipalities in Saskatchewan
- List of resort villages in Saskatchewan
- List of villages in Saskatchewan
- List of summer villages in Alberta
