= Thunderchild First Nation =

Cree tribe and Indian reserve in Saskatchewan, Canada

Coordinates: 53°28′28″N 108°52′45″W

Flag of the Thunderchild First Nation Band in Canada.

Thunderchild First Nation (Cree: ᑳ ᐱᑎᑰᓈᕽ, romanized: kâ-pitikônâhk) is an independent Cree First Nations band government in Turtleford, Saskatchewan, Canada, with no affiliation with any Tribal Council. It is located approximately 113 kilometers northwest of North Battleford. European settlement in 1909 caused the reserve to be moved by the Government of Canada from its original location near Delmas, Saskatchewan, to where it now currently resides near Turtleford, Saskatchewan.

The First Nation's population is 1,868 of whom approximately 630 reside on the reserve.

This reserve came about after Chief Piyesiw-awasis's headmen were forced to sign an adhesion to Treaty Six in August of 1879, at Special Area No. 4. Piyesiw-awasis was one of Big Bear's bodyguards until starvation and sickness led his people to adhere to the treaty. However, Piyesiw-awasis did not put his mark to the treaty document.

== See also ==
- List of Indian reserves in Saskatchewan
- Thunderchild 115B
- Thunderchild 115C
