= Helene Lake =

Lake in Saskatchewan, Canada

- Location in Saskatchewan Helene Lake (Canada)
- Location: RM of Parkdale No. 498 and RM of Medstead No. 497, Saskatchewan
- Coordinates: 53.5501°N 108.2007°W
- Part of: Churchill River drainage basin
- Basin countries: Canada
- Surface area: 2,461.5 ha (6,082 acres)
- Max. depth: 4.2 m (14 ft)
- Shore length^{1}: 33.8 km (21.0 mi)
- Surface elevation: 684 m (2,244 ft)
- ^{1} Shore length is not a well-defined measure.

Helene Lake is a shallow lake in the Canadian province of Saskatchewan. It is on the plateau that separates the Saskatchewan and Churchill River drainage basins. The lake sits in the transition zone between the boreal forest and aspen parkland ecozones of Canada. It has a subarctic climate and is mostly surrounded by muskeg and boreal forests with some agricultural lands near the south-western shore. The lake's outflow is a short river that flows out of the south-western corner and west to neighbouring Midnight Lake. North of Helene Lake is the Meadow Lake Escarpment.

The eastern part of Helene Lake is within the RM of Medstead No. 497 and the western is within the RM of Parkdale No. 498. The small community of Helena Lake is situated near the south-western corner — between Midnight and Helene Lakes. At the north-eastern part of the lake is a section of the Saulteaux 159A Indian reserve. Directly south of Helene Lake is Birch Lake.

== Helene Lake Recreation Site ==
Helene Lake Recreation Site (53.5462°N 108.2258°W) is a small, rustic provincial campground along the north-western shore of Helene Lake. The campground is free and has few services. A gravel road from nearby Highway 4 provides access.

== See also ==
- List of lakes of Saskatchewan
- Tourism in Saskatchewan
