= Little Loon Lake =

Lake in Saskatchewan, Canada

- Location in Saskatchewan Little Loon Lake (Canada)
- Location: RM of Parkdale No. 498, Saskatchewan
- Coordinates: 53.3536°N 108.2481°W
- Part of: Saskatchewan River drainage basin
- Basin countries: Canada
- Max. length: 3 km (1.9 mi)
- Surface area: 96.5 ha (238 acres)
- Max. depth: 9.5 m (31 ft)
- Shore length^{1}: 7.7 km (4.8 mi)
- Surface elevation: 699 m (2,293 ft)
- Settlements: None
- ^{1} Shore length is not a well-defined measure.

Little Loon Lake is a recreational lake in the Canadian province of Saskatchewan. The lake is in the RM of Parkdale No. 498 and near the headwaters of Jackfish Creek in the boreal transition zone. Jackfish Creek flows into Jackfish Lake, which is connected to the North Saskatchewan River via Jackfish River. At 5 kilometres (3.1 mi) to the west, Glaslyn is the closest community to Little Loon Lake. On the southern shore of the lake is Little Loon Regional Park and access to the lake and its amenities is from Highway 3.

== Little Loon Regional Park ==
Little Loon Regional Park (53.3556°N 108.2562°W) is a regional park on the southern shore of Little Loon Lake. The park has a campground, picnic area, a grass greens golf course, mini golf, and a beach. The campground has 58 campsites, washrooms, showers, and a sani-dump. Thirty-four of the campsites are serviced with water and electricity. Little Loon Golf Club is a 9-hole, par 29 course with 2,234 total yards. It opened in 1970 and has a clubhouse that was created from renovating a former one-room Heritage School Building.

== Fish species ==
Fish commonly found in Little Loon Lake include walleye and northern pike. The walleye are stocked while the northern pike are native.

== See also ==
- List of lakes of Saskatchewan
- Tourism in Saskatchewan
