= Thunderchild 115C =

Indian reserve in Saskatchewan, Canada

Coordinates: 53°38′00″N 108°38′05″W

- Indian reserve
- Thunderchild Indian Reserve No. 115C
- Location in Saskatchewan
- First Nation: Thunderchild
- Country: Canada
- Province: Saskatchewan

Area
  - Total: 755.5 ha (1,867 acres)

Population (2016)
  - Total: 34
  - Density: 4.5/km^{2} (12/sq mi)

Thunderchild 115C is an Indian reserve of the Thunderchild First Nation in Saskatchewan. In the 2016 Canadian Census, it recorded a population of 34 living in 14 of its 16 total private dwellings. The reserve is on the western shore of Turtle Lake adjacent to Horseshoe Bay.

== See also ==
- List of Indian reserves in Saskatchewan
