= Saskatchewan Highway 26 =

Provincial highway in Saskatchewan, Canada

Highway 26
- Highway 26 highlighted in red

Route information
- Maintained by Ministry of Highways and Infrastructure
- Length: 198.3 km (123.2 mi)

Major junctions
- South end: Highway 4 north of North Battleford
- Highway 3 at Turtleford and St. Walburg; Highway 55 at Peerless
- North end: Highway 224 / Highway 950 at Goodsoil

Location
- Country: Canada
- Province: Saskatchewan
- Rural municipalities: Meota, Turtle River, Mervin, Frenchman Butte, Loon Lake, Beaver River
- Towns: Turtleford, St. Walburg

Highway system
- Provincial highways in Saskatchewan
| ← Highway 25 | → Highway 27 |

Highway 26 is a provincial highway on the western side of the Canadian province of Saskatchewan. The southern terminus is at the junction with Highway 4 about 20 kilometres (12 mi) north of North Battleford. From there, the highway runs generally north-west until just south of St. Walburg where takes a more northerly route. Highway 26 terminates at a junction with Highways 224 and 950 on the north side of the village of Goodsoil, just south of Meadow Lake Provincial Park. It is about 198 kilometres (123 mi) long.

== Route description ==
The southern 100 kilometres (62 mi) of the nearly 200-kilometre (120 mi) long Highway 26 runs alongside a former Canadian Northern Railway (CNoR) branch line from Prince to St. Walburg, which CNoR built out from North Battleford and steadily extended until 1919. The rail line, and adjoining roads, caused a boom in the area, as early homesteaders were then able to deliver their production to grain elevators. The Canadian National Railway abandoned the entire branch line in 2005, when the remaining grain elevators closed, with grain now transported by truck on Highway 26.

Highway 26's southern terminus begins at Highway 4 about 4.5 kilometres (2.8 mi) east of Prince. South on Highway 4 is North Battleford while north is Jackfish Lake and The Battlefords Provincial Park. From Prince, Highway 26 travels north-west following the aforementioned railway towards the western shore of Jackfish Lake where it provides access to several small communities and parks, such as Meota and Meota Regional Park. Continuing north-west from the lake, the highway passes through Cavalier, Vawn, Edam, Mervin, and Turtleford. On the north side of Turtleford, it begins a 29-kilometre (18 mi) concurrency with Highway 3 that continues to a point about 4 kilometres (2.5 mi) south of St. Walburg. Communities along this stretch include Cleeves and Spruce Lake. At that junction south of St. Walburg, Highway 3 turns west while 26 turns north into town.

Highway 26 travels north through St. Walburg as 2nd St E until the intersection with 1st Ave, at which point it turns east and leaves town. Shortly after leaving St. Walburg, Highway 26 heads due east before turning north-east towards the junction with Highway 795. From Highway 795, it heads north until it meets Highway 304, at which point it turns north-west towards Loon Lake. Heading into Loon Lake, Highway 26 meets, and then has a short 1.3-kilometre (0.81 mi) concurrency with, Highway 699. Highway 699 continues west into Makwa Lake Provincial Park while Highway 26 turns north on 1st Ave. The highway then winds its way through Makwa Lake 129B Indian reserve, follows the western shore of Makwa Lake, crosses Makwa River, and arrives at Pine Cove on the northern shore of Makwa Lake. From Pine Cove, the highway heads north where it crosses the Beaver River and meets Highway 55 south of Peerless. After a short 1.4-kilometre (0.87 mi) concurrency with Highway 55, 26 continues north for a further 7.3 kilometres (4.5 mi) to its northern terminus on the north side of Goodsoil. At the northern terminus, it carries on north into Meadow Lake Provincial Park as Highway 224.

=== Major attractions ===
The following are some major attractions accessible from Highway 26:

- The Goodsoil Historical Museum Site, in Goodsoil, is a Municipal Heritage Property on the Canadian Register of Historic Places
- Makwa Lake Provincial Park at Makwa Lake
- Meota Regional Park on the western shore of Jackfish Lake
- Meadow Lake Provincial Park at the highway's northern terminus
- Ernie the Turtle at Turtleford
- Windmill at the village of Edam
- Imhoff Museum & Art Gallery at St. Walburg
- St.Walburg & District Historical Museum at St. Walburg

== Major intersections ==
From south to north:

| Rural municipality | Location | km | mi | Destinations | Notes |
|---|---|---|---|---|---|
| Meota No. 468 | | 0.0 | 0.0 | Highway 4 – Meadow Lake, The Battlefords | East of Prince |
| Meota No. 468 | Meota | 14.3 | 8.9 | Metinota Access Road | Road accesses the south shore of Jackfish Lake |
| Meota No. 468 | | 18.8 | 11.7 | Jackfish Road – Jackfish Lake | Road accesses the west shore of Jackfish Lake; former Highway 697 north |
| Turtle River No. 469 | Edam | 42.4 | 26.3 | Highway 674 south / Highway 769 east | |
| Mervin No. 499 | Mervin | 60.3 | 37.5 | Highway 794 west | |
| Mervin No. 499 | Turtleford | 68.7 | 42.7 | Highway 303 west – Lloydminster | |
| Mervin No. 499 | Turtleford | 69.5 | 43.2 | Highway 3 east – Glaslyn, Prince Albert | South end of Highway 3 concurrency |
| Mervin No. 499 | Spruce Lake | 88.4 | 54.9 | Highway 796 east | |
| Frenchman Butte No. 501 | | 98.7 | 61.3 | Highway 3 west – Paradise Hill | North end of Highway 3 concurrency |
| Frenchman Butte No. 501 | St. Walburg | 102.7 | 63.8 | | |
| Frenchman Butte No. 501 | | 106.9 | 66.4 | Highway 795 east | |
| Loon Lake No. 561 | | 146.3 | 90.9 | Highway 304 east – Meadow Lake | |
| Loon Lake No. 561 | | 148.8 | 92.5 | Highway 699 east | South end of Highway 699 concurrency |
| Loon Lake No. 561 | Loon Lake | 150.1 | 93.3 | Highway 699 west – Makwa Lake Provincial Park | North end of Highway 699 concurrency |
| Beaver River No. 622 | | 189.6 | 117.8 | Highway 55 east (NWRR) – Meadow Lake, Prince Albert | South end of Highway 55 concurrency |
| Beaver River No. 622 | Peerless | 191.0 | 118.7 | Highway 55 west (NWRR) – Pierceland, Cold Lake | North end of Highway 55 concurrency |
| Beaver River No. 622 | | 191.8 | 119.2 | Highway 779 east – Dorintosh | |
| Beaver River No. 622 | Goodsoil | 198.3 | 123.2 | Highway 954 west Highway 224 north – Meadow Lake Provincial Park | |
1.000 mi = 1.609 km; 1.000 km = 0.621 mi: Concurrency terminus

== See also ==
- Transportation in Saskatchewan
- Roads in Saskatchewan
