= Rural Municipality of Mervin No. 499 =

Rural municipality in Saskatchewan, Canada

Mervin No. 499
- Rural municipality
- Rural Municipality of Mervin No. 499
- Location of the RM of Mervin No. 499 in Saskatchewan
- Coordinates: 53.507°N 108.821°W
- Country: Canada
- Province: Saskatchewan
- Census division: 17
- SARM division: 6
- Formed: January 1, 1913
- Amalgamated: June 1, 1990 (with RM of Greenfield No. 529)

Government
  - Reeve: Gerry Ritz
  - Governing body: RM of Mervin No. 499 Council
  - Administrator: L. Ryan Domotor
  - Office location: Turtleford

Area (2016)
  - Land: 1,594.6 km^{2} (615.7 sq mi)

Population (2016)
  - Total: 1,256
  - Density: 0.8/km^{2} (2.1/sq mi)
- Time zone: CST
  - Summer (DST): CST
- Area codes: 306 and 639
- Website: Official website

The Rural Municipality of Mervin No. 499 (2016 population: 1,256) is a rural municipality (RM) in the Canadian province of Saskatchewan within Census Division No. 17 and SARM Division No. 6.

== History ==
The RM of Mervin No. 499 incorporated as a rural municipality on January 1, 1913. It absorbed the RM of Greenfield No. 529. The RM of Greenfield No. 529 was originally named the RM of Bright Sand No. 529 prior to February 2, 1926.

== Geography ==
=== Communities and localities ===
The following urban municipalities are surrounded by the RM.

Towns

- Turtleford

Villages

- Mervin

Resort villages

- Kivimaa-Moonlight Bay

The following unincorporated communities are within the RM.

Organized hamlets

- Crystal Bay-Sunset
- Evergreen Acres
- Evergreen Beach
- Horseshoe Bay
- Kopp's Kove
- Livelong
- Mowrey Beach
- Parkland Beach
- Powm Beach
- Spruce Lake
- Sunset View Beach, restructured from resort village status, January 1, 2005
- Turtle Lake South Bay

Localities

- Aspen Cove
- Cleeves
- Cuffley
- Daysville
- Diamond Willows
- Eastview Beach
- Elmhurst
- Sandy Point
- Stowlea
- Thunderchild
- Turtle Cove

== Demographics ==
Population history (1981–2016)
Year	Pop.	±%
1981	856	—
1986	889	+3.9%
1991	1,219	+37.1%
1996	1,169	−4.1%
2001	1,169	+0.0%
2006	1,269	+8.6%
2011	1,224	−3.5%
2016	1,256	+2.6%
Source: Statistics Canada via Saskatchewan Bureau of Statistics

In the 2021 Census of Population conducted by Statistics Canada, the RM of Mervin No. 499 had a population of 1,711 living in 781 of its 1,631 total private dwellings, a change of 36.2% from its 2016 population of 1,256. With a land area of 1,581.66 km^{2} (610.68 sq mi), it had a population density of 1.1/km^{2} (2.8/sq mi) in 2021.

In the 2016 Census of Population, the RM of Mervin No. 499 recorded a population of 1,256 living in 583 of its 1,607 total private dwellings, a 2.6% change from its 2011 population of 1,224. With a land area of 1,594.6 km^{2} (615.7 sq mi), it had a population density of 0.8/km^{2} (2.0/sq mi) in 2016.

== Government ==
The RM of Mervin No. 499 is governed by an elected municipal council and an appointed administrator that meets on the second and fourth Tuesday of every month. The reeve of the RM is Gerry Ritz while its administrator is L. Ryan Domotor. The RM's office is located in Turtleford.

== Attractions ==
- Turtle Lake
- Brightsand Lake
  - Brightsand Lake Regional Park

== Transportation ==
- Saskatchewan Highway 3
- Saskatchewan Highway 26
- Saskatchewan Highway 303
- Saskatchewan Highway 794
- Saskatchewan Highway 795
- Saskatchewan Highway 796

== See also ==
- List of rural municipalities in Saskatchewan
