= Evergreen Beach =

Hamlet in Saskatchewan, Canada

Coordinates: 53°36′48″N 108°50′14″W

Evergreen Beach, also known as Evergreen Brightsand, is an organized hamlet in the Canadian province of Saskatchewan under the jurisdiction of the Rural Municipality of Mervin No. 499.

== Geography ==
Evergreen Beach is on the eastern shore of Brightsand Lake.

== Demographics ==
In the 2021 Census of Population conducted by Statistics Canada, Evergreen Brightsand had a population of 53 living in 31 of its 90 total private dwellings, a change of 103.8% from its 2016 population of 26. With a land area of 0.93 km^{2} (0.36 sq mi), it had a population density of 57.0/km^{2} (147.6/sq mi) in 2021.

== See also ==
- List of communities in Saskatchewan
- List of designated places in Saskatchewan
- List of hamlets in Saskatchewan
