= Peerless, Saskatchewan =

Peerless
- Hamlet
- Location within Saskatchewan Location within Canada
- Coordinates: 54°21′0″N 109°14′3″W
- Country: Canada
- Province: Saskatchewan
- Census division: 17
- Rural Municipality: Beaver River No. 622
- Time zone: CST
- Area code: 306
- Highways: Hwy 26, Hwy 55

Peerless is a hamlet in Rural Municipality of Beaver River No. 622, Saskatchewan, Canada. The hamlet is located near the intersection of Highway 26 and Highway 55 about 350 km (220 mi) northwest of Saskatoon and 52 km (32 mi) east of the Alberta border.

== See also ==
- List of communities in Saskatchewan
