= Turtle Lake Monster =

Alleged lake monster in Saskatchewan, Canada

Creature information
- Sub grouping: Lake monster

Origin
- Country: Canada
- Region: Turtle Lake, Saskatchewan
- Habitat: Water

In Canadian folklore, the Turtle Lake Monster is an entity purportedly inhabiting Turtle Lake, in West Central Saskatchewan, Canada. The monster is usually described as a creature 3–9 m (9.8–29.5 ft) long, scaly or smooth, with no dorsal fin, and a head resembling either a dog, a seahorse, or a pig. Natives are said to be nervous about the attention the monster might bring and claim it's simply a massive sturgeon that left its home and lives in Turtle Lake. About once a year, someone claims to have had an encounter with the beast.

Reports date back to pre-settlement days when the local Cree had a legend about people who ventured into the Turtle Lake Monster's territory and vanished without a trace. There is speculation that the monster sightings may be attributed to sightings of an unusually large lake sturgeon, or a relict population of prehistoric plesiosaurs.

There was also a report of a man seeing the creature while on the lake with his grandson and daughter. They say they saw the monster about 12 metres (39 ft) away. The witnesses were quoted as saying, "Its head came up, its back came up and it sort of rolled over". They further added, "we never saw the tail … its head looked like a seahorse".

Gord Sedgewick, a fisheries biologist and the Ministry of Environment in Saskatchewan wrote:

Much has been reported and written over the years about the Turtle Lake "monster" (although nothing has been reported in recent years). Over the years, people fishing in the open water have reported sightings of a big "thing" swimming near their boat. Could it have been a lake sturgeon? Lake sturgeon inhabit the Saskatchewan River system, and the outflow from Turtle Lake flows via the Turtle River directly into the North Saskatchewan River. It is not inconceivable during some years of very high outflow that sturgeon could have found their way from the North Saskatchewan up the Turtle River and into Turtle Lake. Sturgeon have a very long life span, so the few that may have entered the lake could have stayed there for many decades. And of course, the longer they lived in the lake, the larger they grew. Sturgeon are bottom feeding fish, so they wouldn't often be sighted near the surface. The presence of a few lake sturgeon is the most plausible explanation for the numerous reported sightings of a "monster" swimming in the waters of Turtle Lake. Having said this, sturgeon have never been caught in any test netting surveys, nor in any commercial fishing nets, so there is no conclusive evidence of their presence in the lake. However, there are similarities between Turtle Lake and Candle Lake in regard to their connection to the Saskatchewan River system; in the case of Candle Lake, a few large lake sturgeon have actually been caught which verifies they were able to find their way upstream and take up residence in the lake. But for Turtle Lake we'll likely never know for sure!

== See also ==
- List of lake monsters
