= Turtle View =

Resort village in Saskatchewan, Canada

- Resort village
- Resort Village of Turtle View
- Location within Saskatchewan Location within Canada
- Coordinates: 53.314°N 108.414°W
- Country: Canada
- Province: Saskatchewan
- Census division: 17
- Rural municipality: Parkdale No. 498
- Incorporated: January 1, 2020

Government
  - Mayor: Troy Johnson
  - Governing body: Resort Village Council
  - Administrator: Lorrie Bannerman

Population (2021)
  - Total: 193
- Time zone: CST
  - Summer (DST): CST
- Area codes: 306 and 639
- Highway(s): Highway 697
- Waterway(s): Turtle Lake
- Website: Official website

Turtle View (population: 193) is a resort village in the Canadian province of Saskatchewan within Census Division No. 17. It is on the shores of Turtle Lake in the Rural Municipality of Parkdale No. 498, approximately 207 kilometres (129 mi) northwest of Saskatoon.

== History ==
Turtle View incorporated as a resort village on January 1, 2020. It was formed through the amalgamation of the organized hamlets of Indian Point – Golden Sands and Turtle Lake Lodge.

== Demographics ==
According to Statistics Canada, Turtle View had a population of 193 in 2021.

== Government ==
The Resort Village of Turtle View is governed by an elected municipal council and an appointed administrator that meets on the third Saturday of every month. The mayor is Troy Johnson and its administrator is Lorrie Bannerman.

== See also ==
- List of communities in Saskatchewan
- List of municipalities in Saskatchewan
- List of resort villages in Saskatchewan
- List of villages in Saskatchewan
- List of summer villages in Alberta
