= Saulteaux 159A =

Indian reserve in Saskatchewan, Canada

Coordinates: 53°29′22″N 108°07′29″W

- Indian reserve
- Saulteaux Indian Reserve No. 159A
- Location in Saskatchewan
- First Nation: Saulteaux
- Country: Canada
- Province: Saskatchewan

Area
  - Total: 2,011.3 ha (4,970 acres)

Population (2016)
  - Total: 26
  - Density: 1.3/km^{2} (3.3/sq mi)

Saulteaux 159A is an Indian reserve of the Saulteaux First Nation in Saskatchewan. It is about 77 kilometres (48 mi) north of North Battleford, on the northern shore of Birch Lake and eastern shore of Helene Lake. In the 2016 Canadian Census, it recorded a population of 26 living in 7 of its 10 total private dwellings.

== See also ==
- List of Indian reserves in Saskatchewan
