= Weyakwin Lake =

Lake in Saskatchewan, Canada

- Location in Saskatchewan Weyakwin Lake (Canada)
- Location: Northern Administration District, Saskatchewan
- Coordinates: 54.5001°N 106.0005°W
- Part of: Churchill River drainage basin
- River sources: Thunder Hills
- Primary outflows: Weyakwin River
- Basin countries: Canada
- Surface area: 7,582.1 ha (18,736 acres)
- Max. depth: 11.1 m (36 ft)
- Shore length^{1}: 99 km (62 mi)
- Surface elevation: 584 m (1,916 ft)
- Settlements: Ramsey Bay
- ^{1} Shore length is not a well-defined measure.

Weyakwin Lake is a lake in the Canadian province of Saskatchewan. It is situated east of the Thunder Hills and north-east of Prince Albert National Park in the boreal forest ecozone. The lake's outflow, Weyakwin River, stems from the eastern shore and heads east into Montreal Lake. Ramsey Bay, located at the lake's southern end on the western shore of Ramsey Bay, is the only community on the lake. Also at the southern end is the provincial Weyakwin Lake (Ramsey Bay) Recreation Site.

Access to Weyakwin Lake and its amenities is from a 16-kilometre (9.9 mi) all-weather road that branches off Highway 2 at the community of Weyakwin.

== Weyakwin Lake (Ramsey Bay) Recreation Site ==
Weyakwin Lake (Ramsey Bay) Recreation Site (54.4472°N 105.9748°W) is a provincial recreation site at the southern end of Weyakwin Lake. It is adjacent to the community of Ramsey Bay and has a campground and access to the lake. The campground has campsites with power hook ups, showers, and laundry facilities. There are also two cabins for rent. The park has access to the lake for swimming at sandy beaches, fishing, and boating. Canoes are available for rent.

== Fish species ==
Fish commonly found in Weyakwin Lake include walleye, northern pike, yellow perch, and burbot.

== See also ==
- List of lakes of Saskatchewan
- Tourism in Saskatchewan
