= Turtle Lake Lodge =

Former hamlet in Saskatchewan, Canada

- Former organized hamlet
- Location within Saskatchewan Location within Canada
- Coordinates: 53.314°N 108.414°W
- Country: Canada
- Province: Saskatchewan
- Census division: 17
- Rural municipality: Parkdale No. 498
- Amalgamated: January 1, 2020
- Time zone: UTC-6 (CST)
- Area code: 306
- Highway(s): Highway 697
- Waterway(s): Turtle Lake

Turtle Lake Lodge is a former organized hamlet of the Rural Municipality of Parkdale No. 498 that is now part of the Resort Village of Turtle View in Saskatchewan, Canada. It is located on the eastern shore of Turtle Lake, approximately 209 kilometres (130 mi) northwest of Saskatoon.

== History ==
Turtle Lake Lodge amalgamated with the nearby Organized Hamlet of Indian Point – Golden Sands on January 1, 2020, to form the Resort Village of Turtle View.

== See also ==
- List of communities in Saskatchewan
