= Pasqua Lake, Saskatchewan =

Hamlet in Saskatchewan, Canada

Pasqua Lake
- Resort village
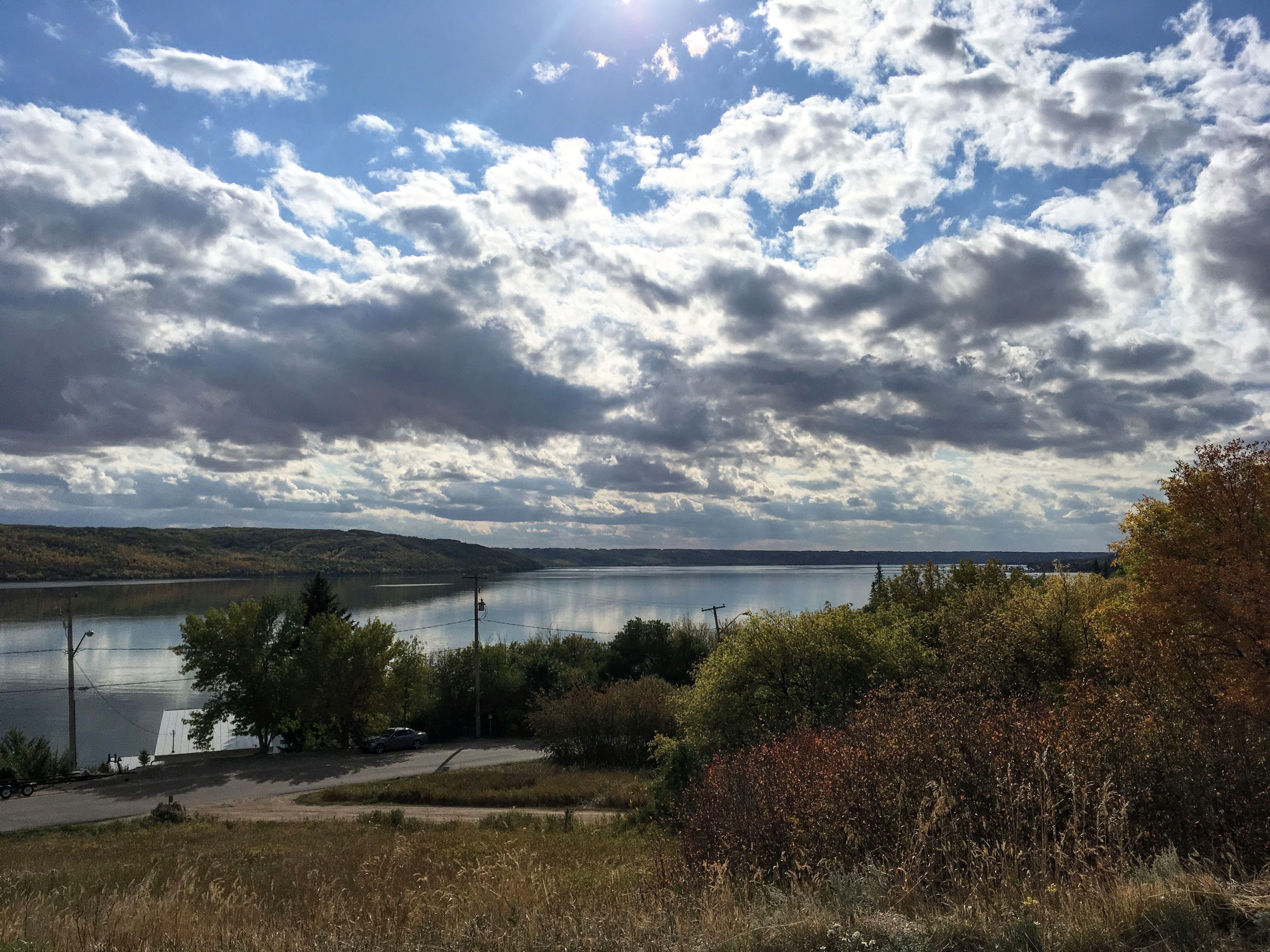
- Pasqua Lake in 2017

- Location of Pasqua Lake in Saskatchewan
- Coordinates: 50.793°N 103.963°W
- Country: Canada
- Province: Saskatchewan
- Rural Municipality: North Qu'Appelle No. 187
- Organized hamlet: 1 November 1985
- Resort village: 1 January 2024

Area
  - Land: 0.64 km^{2} (0.25 sq mi)

Population (2021)
  - Total: 213
- Time zone: UTC-6 (Saskatchewan (ST))
- Area code: 306

Pasqua Lake is a resort village on a lake of the same name in the Qu'Appelle Valley in the Canadian province of Saskatchewan.

== History ==
Pasqua Lake was incorporated as an organized hamlet on 1 November 1985. It incorporated as a resort village on 1 January 2024.

== Geography ==
The Organized Hamlet of Pasqua Lake includes the communities of Bence Beach, Bolingbrook Place, Braumberger Beach, Qu'Appelle Beach, Mapleview, Pasqua, Pasqua Lake, Spanier Beach, and Wambach.

== Demographics ==
In the 2021 Census of Population conducted by Statistics Canada, Pasqua Lake had a population of 213 living in 101 of its 256 total private dwellings, a change of 6.5% from its 2016 population of 200. With a land area of 0.64 km^{2} (0.25 sq mi), it had a population density of 332.8/km^{2} (862.0/sq mi) in 2021.

== Government ==
The first council of the Resort Village of Pasqua Lake consists of a mayor and three councillors. Its first election occurred on 29 July 2023.

== See also ==
- List of communities in Saskatchewan
- List of designated places in Saskatchewan
- List of resort villages in Saskatchewan
