= Napatak, Saskatchewan =

Napatak
- Resort subdivision (designated place)
- Location of Napatak in Saskatchewan
- Coordinates: 54.988°N 105.266°W
- Country: Canada
- Province: Saskatchewan
- Census division: No. 18
- District: Northern Saskatchewan Administration District

Government
  - Type: Unincorporated

Area
  - Land: 0.57 km^{2} (0.22 sq mi)

Population (2021)
  - Total: 118
- Time zone: UTC-6 (CST)
- Area code: +1-306

Napatak is an unincorporated community and resort subdivision within northern Saskatchewan, Canada. It is recognized as a designated place by Statistics Canada.

== Geography ==
Napatak is on the western shore of Lac la Ronge.

== Demographics ==
In the 2021 Census of Population conducted by Statistics Canada, Napatak had a population of 118 living in 54 of its 116 total private dwellings, a change of −11.9% from its 2016 population of 134. With a land area of 0.57 km^{2} (0.22 sq mi), it had a population density of 207.0/km^{2} (536.2/sq mi) in 2021.
