= Powm Beach =

Community in Saskatchewan, Canada

- Hamlet
- Location in Saskatchewan Powm Beach (Canada)
- Coordinates: 53°34′24″N 108°42′18″W
- Country: Canada
- Province: Saskatchewan
- Census division: 17
- Rural municipality: Mervin No. 499
- Highway(s): Highway 795
- Waterway(s): Turtle Lake

Powm Beach is a hamlet in the Canadian province of Saskatchewan. It is on the western shore of Turtle Lake.

== Demographics ==
In the 2021 Census of Population conducted by Statistics Canada, Powm Beach had a population of 59 living in 28 of its 97 total private dwellings, a change of 59.5% from its 2016 population of 37. With a land area of 0.46 km^{2} (0.18 sq mi), it had a population density of 128.3/km^{2} (332.2/sq mi) in 2021.

== See also ==
- List of communities in Saskatchewan
