= Turtle Lake South Bay =

Community in Saskatchewan, Canada

Turtle Lake South Lake
- Hamlet
- Location in Saskatchewan Turtle Lake South Lake (Canada)
- Coordinates: 53°31′01″N 108°42′28″W
- Country: Canada
- Province: Saskatchewan
- Census division: 17
- Rural municipality: Mervin No. 499
- Highway(s): Highway 795
- Waterway(s): Turtle Lake

Turtle Lake South Bay is a hamlet in the Canadian province of Saskatchewan. It is on the southern shore of Turtle Lake where the Turtlelake River flows out.

== Demographics ==
In the 2021 Census of Population conducted by Statistics Canada, Turtle Lake South Bay had a population of 61 living in 32 of its 107 total private dwellings, a change of 48.8% from its 2016 population of 41. With a land area of 0.36 km^{2} (0.14 sq mi), it had a population density of 169.4/km^{2} (438.9/sq mi) in 2021.

== See also ==
- List of communities in Saskatchewan
