= Indian Point – Golden Sands =

Former hamlet in Saskatchewan, Canada

- Former organized hamlet
- Interactive map of Indian Point – Golden Sands
- Coordinates: 53.5896806°N 108.60465°W
- Country: Canada
- Province: Saskatchewan
- Census division: 17
- Rural municipality: Parkdale No. 498
- Amalgamated: January 1, 2020

Area (2016)
  - Land: 0.81 km^{2} (0.31 sq mi)

Population (2016)
  - Total: 88
  - Density: 109.3/km^{2} (283/sq mi)
- Time zone: UTC-6 (CST)
- Area code: 306
- Highway(s): Highway 697
- Waterway(s): Turtle Lake

Indian Point – Golden Sands is a former organized hamlet of the Rural Municipality of Parkdale No. 498 that is now part of the Resort Village of Turtle View in Saskatchewan, Canada. It is also recognized as a designated place by Statistics Canada. It is located on the east shore of Turtle Lake, approximately 209 kilometres (130 mi) northwest of Saskatoon.

== History ==
Indian Point – Golden Sands amalgamated with the nearby Organized Hamlet of Turtle Lake Lodge on January 1, 2020 to form the Resort Village of Turtle View.

== Demographics ==
In the 2021 Census of Population conducted by Statistics Canada, Indian Point-Golden Sands had a population of 137 living in 66 of its 217 total private dwellings, a change of 55.7% from its 2016 population of 88. With a land area of 0.8 km^{2} (0.31 sq mi), it had a population density of 171.3/km^{2} (443.5/sq mi) in 2021.

== See also ==
- List of communities in Saskatchewan
