= Livelong, Saskatchewan =

Community in Saskatchewan, Canada

Livelong
- Hamlet
- Location within Saskatchewan Location within Canada
- Coordinates: 53°26′52″N 108°42′16″W
- Country: Canada
- Province: Saskatchewan
- Census division: 17
- Rural municipality (RM): Mervin No. 499
- Time zone: CST
- Area code: 306

Livelong is a hamlet in the Rural Municipality of Mervin No. 499 in the Canadian province of Saskatchewan. Access is from Highway 795.

A war memorial cenotaph was erected in front of the Livelong Legion #192. Constructed in 1988 in memory of all veterans of Livelong and district. The cenotaph was constructed by Bill Rhode, Sam Rhode, and Murray Kopp. Art Dorval made the cross and it was erected by Chief Denny.

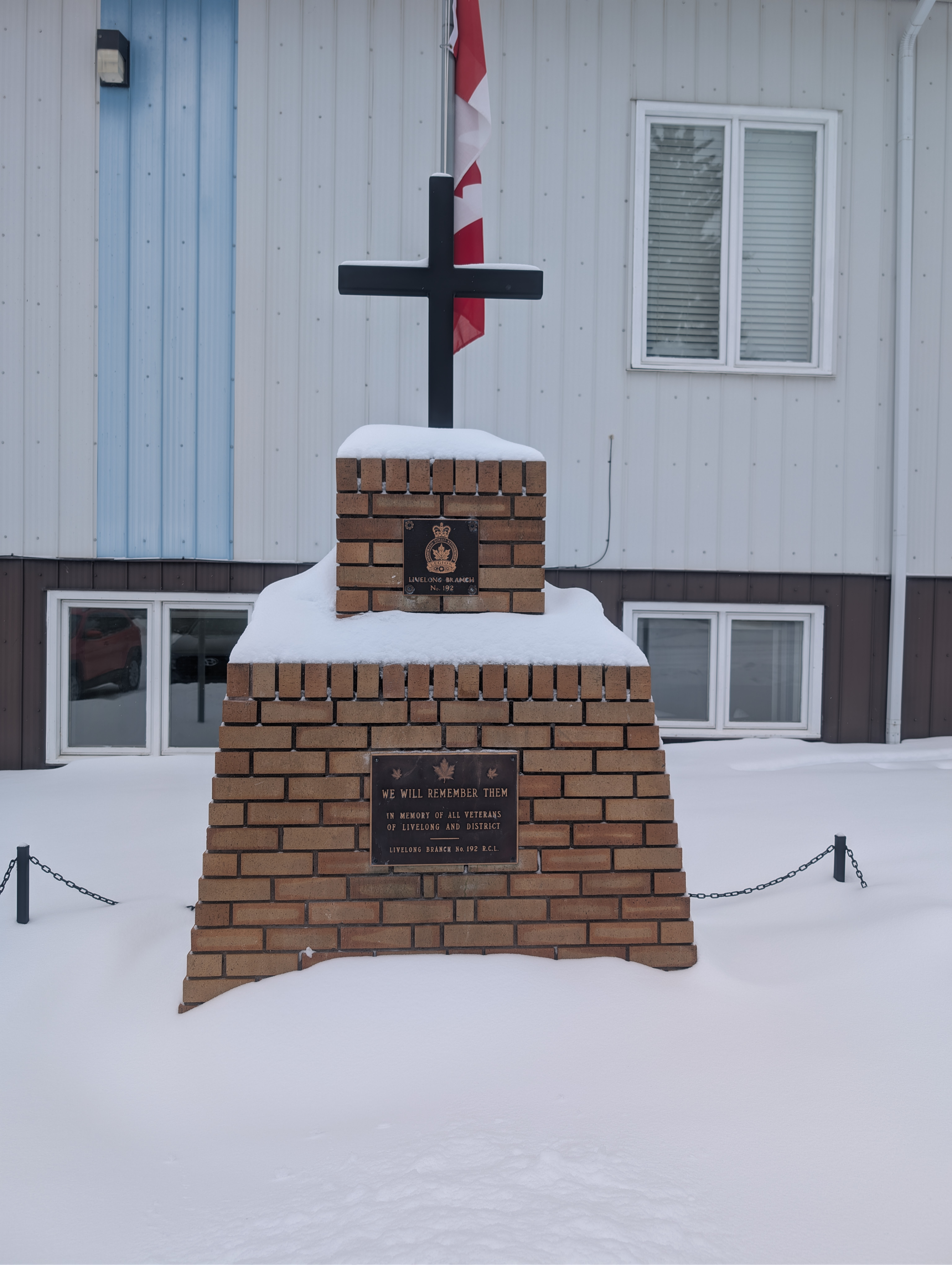
Livelong Cenotaph

== Demographics ==
In the 2021 Census of Population conducted by Statistics Canada, Livelong had a population of 100 living in 39 of its 47 total private dwellings, a change of 35.1% from its 2016 population of 74. With a land area of 0.17 km^{2} (0.066 sq mi), it had a population density of 588.2/km^{2} (1,523.5/sq mi) in 2021.

== Churches ==
- St. John's Anglican Church

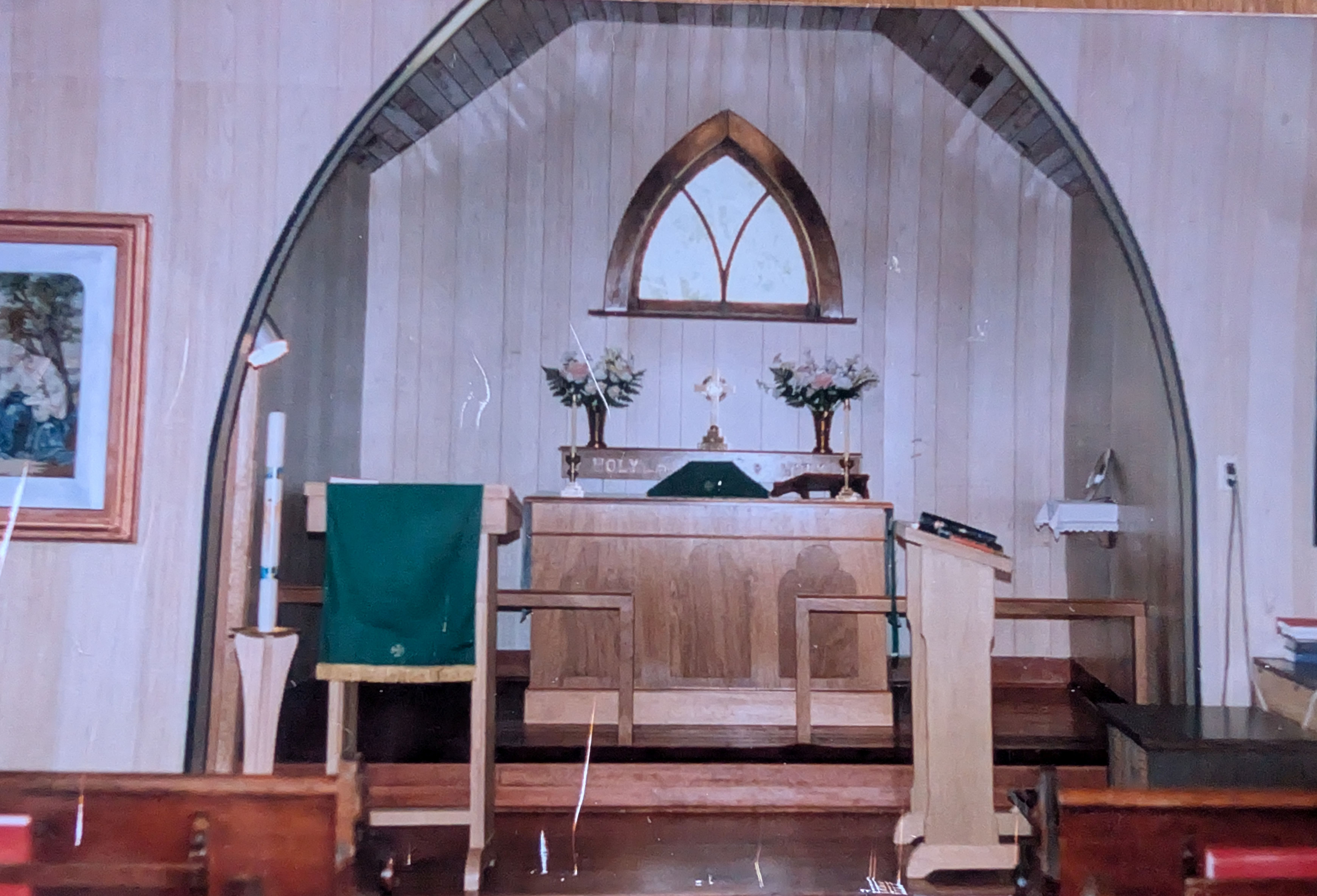
St. Johns Church Altar August 1982

== Clubs and organizations ==
- Turtle Lake Watershed Inc. Their mission: The maintenance of a healthy aquatic ecosystem within the Turtle Lake watershed basin. (Turtle Lake is approx. 6 miles north of Livelong.)
- Livelong Pinetoppers
- Livelong Curling Club

== Pop culture ==
- Girl at the Window: Author Byrna Barclay takes her readers from Livelong, Saskatchewan to Spain and the Island of Crete in this collection of short stories published in 2004.
- The Garden of Eloice Loon, written by Edna Alford a Livelong resident.

== See also ==
- List of communities in Saskatchewan
