= Potato Lake, Saskatchewan =

Potato Lake
- Cluster subdivision (designated place)
- Location of Potato Lake in Saskatchewan
- Coordinates: 55.004°N 105.346°W
- Country: Canada
- Province: Saskatchewan
- Census division: No. 18
- District: Northern Saskatchewan Administration District

Government
  - Type: Unincorporated

Area
  - Land: 1.60 km^{2} (0.62 sq mi)

Population (2021)
  - Total: 43
- Time zone: UTC-6 (CST)
- Area code: +1-306

Potato Lake is an unincorporated community and cluster subdivision within northern Saskatchewan, Canada. It is recognized as a designated place by Statistics Canada.

== Geography ==
Potato Lake is along Highway 2 on the western shore of Potato Lake.

== Demographics ==
In the 2021 Census of Population conducted by Statistics Canada, Potato Lake had a population of 43 living in 19 of its 20 total private dwellings, a change of −4.4% from its 2016 population of 45. With a land area of 1.6 km^{2} (0.62 sq mi), it had a population density of 26.9/km^{2} (69.6/sq mi) in 2021.
