= Ramsey Bay, Saskatchewan =

Community in Saskatchewan, Canada

Ramsey Bay
- Resort subdivision (designated place)
- Location of Ramsey Bay in Saskatchewan Ramsey Bay (Canada)
- Coordinates: 54.446°N 105.972°W
- Country: Canada
- Province: Saskatchewan
- Census division: No. 18
- District: Northern Saskatchewan Administration District

Government
  - Type: Unincorporated

Area
  - Land: 0.52 km^{2} (0.20 sq mi)

Population (2021)
  - Total: 159
- Time zone: UTC-6 (CST)
- Area code: +1-306

Ramsey Bay is an unincorporated community and resort subdivision within northern Saskatchewan, Canada. It is recognized as a designated place by Statistics Canada.

== Geography ==
Ramsey Bay is at the southern end of Weyakwin Lake on the western shore of Ramsey Bay.

== Demographics ==
In the 2021 Census of Population conducted by Statistics Canada, Ramsey Bay had a population of 159 living in 69 of its 210 total private dwellings, a change of 101.3% from its 2016 population of 79. With a land area of 0.52 km^{2} (0.20 sq mi), it had a population density of 305.8/km^{2} (791.9/sq mi) in 2021.

== See also ==
- List of communities in Saskatchewan
