= Mowrey Beach =

- Organized hamlet
- Location of Mowrey Beach in Saskatchewan Mowrey Beach (Canada)
- Coordinates: 53.633°N 108.840°W
- Country: Canada
- Province: Saskatchewan
- Census division: 17
- Rural municipality (RM): Mervin No. 499
- Time zone: CST
- Area code: 306
- Waterways: Brightsand Lake
- Website: Official website

Mowrey Beach is an organized hamlet within the Rural Municipality (RM) of Mervin No. 499 in the Canadian province of Saskatchewan. It is on the northeast shore of Brightsand Lake approximately 87 km (54 mi) northeast of the City of Lloydminster.

== Government ==
While Mowrey Beach is under the jurisdiction of the RM of Mervin No. 499, it has a three-person hamlet board.
