= Kopp's Kove =

Community in Saskatchewan, Canada

- Hamlet
- Location in Saskatchewan Kopp's Kove (Canada)
- Coordinates: 53°31′44″N 108°41′31″W
- Country: Canada
- Province: Saskatchewan
- Census division: 17
- Rural municipality: Mervin No. 499
- Highway(s): Highway 795
- Waterway(s): Turtle Lake

Kopp's Kove is a hamlet in the Canadian province of Saskatchewan. It is on the western shore at the south end of Turtle Lake, west of Prince Albert and north-west of Saskatoon.

== Demographics ==
In the 2021 Census of Population conducted by Statistics Canada, Kopp's Kove had a population of 55 living in 31 of its 110 total private dwellings, a change of 57.1% from its 2016 population of 35. With a land area of 0.16 km^{2} (0.062 sq mi), it had a population density of 343.8/km^{2} (890.3/sq mi) in 2021.

== See also ==
- List of communities in Saskatchewan
