= Eagle Point, Saskatchewan =

Eagle Point
- Cluster subdivision (designated place)
- Location of Eagle Point in Saskatchewan
- Coordinates: 55.127°N 105.263°W
- Country: Canada
- Province: Saskatchewan
- Census division: No. 18
- District: Northern Saskatchewan Administration District

Government
  - Type: Unincorporated

Area
  - Land: 1.00 km^{2} (0.39 sq mi)

Population (2021)
  - Total: 105
- Time zone: UTC-6 (CST)
- Area code: +1-306

Eagle Point is an unincorporated community and cluster subdivision within northern Saskatchewan, Canada. It is recognized as a designated place by Statistics Canada.

== Geography ==
Eagle Point is on the western shore of Lac la Ronge.

== Demographics ==
In the 2021 Census of Population conducted by Statistics Canada, Eagle Point had a population of 105 living in 33 of its 36 total private dwellings, a change of 15.4% from its 2016 population of 91. With a land area of 1 km^{2} (0.39 sq mi), it had a population density of 105.0/km^{2} (271.9/sq mi) in 2021.
