= Horseshoe Bay, Saskatchewan =

Community in Saskatchewan, Canada

Horseshoe Bay
- Hamlet
- Location in Saskatchewan Horseshoe Bay (Canada)
- Coordinates: 53°37′00″N 108°38′26″W
- Country: Canada
- Province: Saskatchewan
- Census division: 17
- Rural municipality: Mervin No. 499
- Waterway(s): Turtle Lake

Horseshoe Bay is a hamlet in the Canadian province of Saskatchewan. It is on the western shore of Turtle Lake surrounded by the Thunderchild 115C Indian reserve.

== Demographics ==
In the 2021 Census of Population conducted by Statistics Canada, Horseshoe Bay had a population of 90 living in 46 of its 170 total private dwellings, a change of 143.2% from its 2016 population of 37. With a land area of 0.8 km^{2} (0.31 sq mi), it had a population density of 112.5/km^{2} (291.4/sq mi) in 2021.

== See also ==
- List of communities in Saskatchewan
