= Thunderchild 115B =

Indian reserve in Saskatchewan, Canada

Coordinates: 53°29′22″N 108°51′46″W

- Indian reserve
- Thunderchild Indian Reserve No. 115B
- Location in Saskatchewan
- First Nation: Thunderchild
- Country: Canada
- Province: Saskatchewan

Area
  - Total: 6,131.4 ha (15,151 acres)

Population (2016)
  - Total: 706
  - Density: 11.5/km^{2} (29.8/sq mi)
- Community Well-Being Index: 42

Thunderchild 115B is an Indian reserve of the Thunderchild First Nation in Saskatchewan. It is 85 kilometres northwest of North Battleford. In the 2016 Canadian Census, it recorded a population of 706 living in 172 of its 200 total private dwellings. In the same year, its Community Well-Being index was calculated at 42 of 100, compared to 58.4 for the average First Nations community and 77.5 for the average non-Indigenous community.

== See also ==
- List of Indian reserves in Saskatchewan
