= Parkland Beach, Saskatchewan =

Community in Saskatchewan, Canada

Parkland Beach
- Hamlet
- Location in Saskatchewan Parkland Beach (Canada)
- Coordinates: 53°33′06″N 108°41′33″W
- Country: Canada
- Province: Saskatchewan
- Census division: 17
- Rural municipality: Mervin No. 499
- Highway(s): Highways 795, 796
- Waterway(s): Turtle Lake

Parkland Beach is a hamlet in the Canadian province of Saskatchewan on the western shore of Turtle Lake.

== Demographics ==
In the 2021 Census of Population conducted by Statistics Canada, Parkland Beach had a population of 27 living in 15 of its 50 total private dwellings, a change of 170% from its 2016 population of 10. With a land area of 0.38 km^{2} (0.15 sq mi), it had a population density of 71.1/km^{2} (184.0/sq mi) in 2021.

== See also ==
- List of communities in Saskatchewan
