= Paynton Ferry =

Coordinates: 53.023°N 108.829°W

The Paynton Ferry is a cable ferry in the Canadian province of Saskatchewan near Paynton, Saskatchewan. The ferry crosses the North Saskatchewan River, as part of Grid Road 674.

The six-car ferry is operated by the Saskatchewan Ministry of Highways and Infrastructure. The ferry is free of tolls and operates between 6:00 am and 11:00 pm during the ice-free season. The ferry has a length of 18.2 metres (60 ft), a width of 6.0 metres (19.7 ft), and a load limit of 31.5 tonnes (31.0 long tons; 34.7 short tons).

The ferry handles approximately 30,000 vehicles a year.

https://www.saskatchewan.ca/residents/transportation/ferry-crossings/paynton-ferry

== See also ==
- List of crossings of the North Saskatchewan River
