= Evergreen Acres, Saskatchewan =

Community in Saskatchewan, Canada

Evergreen Acres
- Hamlet
- Location in Saskatchewan Evergreen Acres (Canada)
- Coordinates: 53°31′47″N 108°39′44″W
- Country: Canada
- Province: Saskatchewan
- Census division: 17
- Rural municipality: Mervin No. 499
- Highway(s): Highway 697
- Waterway(s): Turtle Lake

Evergreen Acres is a hamlet in the Canadian province of Saskatchewan on the south-eastern shore of Turtle Lake.

== Demographics ==
In the 2021 Census of Population conducted by Statistics Canada, Evergreen Acres had a population of 43 living in 24 of its 48 total private dwellings, a change of 115% from its 2016 population of 20. With a land area of 0.15 km^{2} (0.058 sq mi), it had a population density of 286.7/km^{2} (742.5/sq mi) in 2021.

== See also ==
- List of communities in Saskatchewan
