= Rural Municipality of Parkdale No. 498 =

Rural municipality in Saskatchewan, Canada

Parkdale No. 498
- Rural municipality
- Rural Municipality of Parkdale No. 498
- Location of the RM of Parkdale No. 498 in Saskatchewan
- Coordinates: 53.450°N 108.445°W
- Country: Canada
- Province: Saskatchewan
- Census division: 17
- SARM division: 6
- Formed: January 1, 1913

Government
  - Reeve: Daniel Hicks
  - Governing body: RM of Parkdale No. 498 Council
  - Administrator: Ashela McCullough
  - Office location: Glaslyn

Area (2016)
  - Land: 1,388.9 km^{2} (536.3 sq mi)

Population (2016)
  - Total: 621
  - Density: 0.4/km^{2} (1.0/sq mi)
- Time zone: CST
  - Summer (DST): CST
- Area codes: 306 and 639
- Website: Official website

The Rural Municipality of Parkdale No. 498 (2016 population: 621) is a rural municipality (RM) in the Canadian province of Saskatchewan within Census Division No. 17 and SARM Division No. 6.

== History ==
The RM of Parkdale No. 498 incorporated as a rural municipality on January 1, 1913.

== Geography ==
=== Communities and localities ===
The following urban municipalities are surrounded by the RM.

Villages

- Glaslyn

Resort villages

- Turtle View (incorporated on January 1, 2020, through the amalgamation of the organized hamlets of Turtle Lake Lodge and Indian Point – Golden Sands)

The following unincorporated communities are within the RM.

Organized hamlets

- Fairholme

Localities

- Evergreen Acres
- Helen Lake
- Longhope
- Midnight Lake
- Minnehaha
- Park Bluff
- Robinhood
- Speedwell

== Demographics ==
Population history (1981–2016)
Year	Pop.	±%
1981	814	—
1986	816	+0.2%
1991	768	−5.9%
1996	691	−10.0%
2001	645	−6.7%
2006	711	+10.2%
2011	631	−11.3%
2016	621	−1.6%
Source: Statistics Canada via Saskatchewan Bureau of Statistics

In the 2021 Census of Population conducted by Statistics Canada, the RM of Parkdale No. 498 had a population of 725 living in 311 of its 734 total private dwellings, a change of 16.7% from its 2016 population of 621. With a land area of 1,375.62 km^{2} (531.13 sq mi), it had a population density of 0.5/km^{2} (1.4/sq mi) in 2021.

In the 2016 Census of Population, the RM of Parkdale No. 498 recorded a population of 621 living in 264 of its 741 total private dwellings, a −1.6% change from its 2011 population of 631. With a land area of 1,388.9 km^{2} (536.3 sq mi), it had a population density of 0.4/km^{2} (1.2/sq mi) in 2016.

== Attractions ==
- Little Loon Lake
  - Little Loon Lake Regional Park
- Turtle Lake
  - Turtle Lake Recreation Site
- Helene Lake Recreation Site

== Government ==
The RM of Parkdale No. 498 is governed by an elected municipal council and an appointed administrator that meets on the second Wednesday of every month. The reeve of the RM is Daniel Hicks while its administrator is Ashela McCullough. The RM's office is located in Glaslyn.

== Transportation ==
- Saskatchewan Highway 3
- Saskatchewan Highway 4
- Saskatchewan Highway 794
- Canadian Pacific Railway (abandoned)
- Glaslyn Airport

== See also ==
- List of rural municipalities in Saskatchewan
