= Mervin, Saskatchewan =

Village in Saskatchewan, Canada

Village of Mervin
- Village
- Location of Mervin in Saskatchewan Village of Mervin (Canada)
- Country: Canada
- Province: Saskatchewan
- Region: West-central
- Census division: 17
- Rural municipality: Mervin No. 499
- Post office Founded: N/A
- Incorporated (Village): N/A
- Incorporated (Town): N/A

Government
  - Deputy Mayor: Clarence Pearce
  - Councillors: Keri Burgess, Cliff Currie, Janessa Macnab, Doris Tollifson
  - Administrator: Tannys Thom
  - Governing body: Mervin Village Council

Area
  - Total: 0.73 km^{2} (0.28 sq mi)

Population (2006)
  - Total: 228
  - Density: 198.7/km^{2} (515/sq mi)
- Time zone: CST
- Postal code: S0M 1Y0
- Area code: 306
- Highways: Highway 26

Mervin (2016 population: 159) is a village in the Canadian province of Saskatchewan within the Rural Municipality of Mervin No. 499 and Census Division No. 17.

The village was named for the son of the first postmaster, Archie Gemmell.

== History ==
Mervin incorporated as a village on March 17, 1920.

== Demographics ==
Population history (1981–2016)
Year	Pop.	±%
1981	155	—
1986	174	+12.3%
1991	156	−10.3%
1996	161	+3.2%
2001	146	−9.3%
2006	145	−0.7%
2011	160	+10.3%
2016	159	−0.6%
Source: Statistics Canada via Saskatchewan Bureau of Statistics

In the 2021 Census of Population conducted by Statistics Canada, Mervin had a population of 159 living in 72 of its 84 total private dwellings, a change of 0% from its 2016 population of 159. With a land area of 0.69 km^{2} (0.27 sq mi), it had a population density of 230.4/km^{2} (596.8/sq mi) in 2021.

In the 2016 Census of Population, the Village of Mervin recorded a population of 159 living in 83 of its 94 total private dwellings, a −0.6% change from its 2011 population of 160. With a land area of 0.73 km^{2} (0.28 sq mi), it had a population density of 217.8/km^{2} (564.1/sq mi) in 2016.

== See also ==
- List of communities in Saskatchewan
- List of villages in Saskatchewan
