= Crystal Bay-Sunset =

Canadian village in Sakatchewan

Coordinates: 53°33′03″N 108°51′37″W

Crystal Bay-Sunset is a hamlet in the Canadian province of Saskatchewan.

== Demographics ==
In the 2021 Census of Population conducted by Statistics Canada, Crystal Bay-Sunset had a population of 39 living in 22 of its 94 total private dwellings, a change of 160% from its 2016 population of 15. With a land area of 0.53 km^{2} (0.20 sq mi), it had a population density of 73.6/km^{2} (190.6/sq mi) in 2021.
