= Prince, Saskatchewan =

Hamlet in Saskatchewan, Canada

Coordinates: 52.9580°N 108.3745°W

Prince is a hamlet in the Canadian province of Saskatchewan. Access is from Highway 26. It is within the Rural Municipality of Meota No. 468.

== Demographics ==
In the 2021 Census of Population conducted by Statistics Canada, Prince had a population of 37 living in 12 of its 14 total private dwellings, a change of -26% from its 2016 population of 50. With a land area of 0.66 km^{2} (0.25 sq mi), it had a population density of 56.1/km^{2} (145.2/sq mi) in 2021.

== See also ==
- List of hamlets in Saskatchewan
