= Glaslyn, Saskatchewan =

Village in Saskatchewan, Canada

Glaslyn
- Village
- Village of Glaslyn
- Location of Glaslyn in Saskatchewan Glaslyn (Canada)
- Coordinates: 53.358°N 108.372°W
- Country: Canada
- Province: Saskatchewan
- Region: West-central
- Census division: 17
- Rural municipality: Parkdale No. 498
- Post office Founded: 1911
- Incorporated (Village): 1929

Government
  - Type: Municipal
  - Governing body: Glaslyn Village Council
  - Mayor: Ken Morrison
  - Administrator: Kate Clarke
  - MLA: Scott Moe
  - MP of Battlefords—Lloydminster: Gerry Ritz

Area
  - Total: 1.97 km^{2} (0.76 sq mi)

Population (2016)
  - Total: 387
  - Density: 196.3/km^{2} (508/sq mi)
- Time zone: UTC-6 (CST)
- Postal code: S0M 0Y0
- Area code: 306
- Highways: Highway 3 Highway 4
- Railways: Abandoned
- Website: Village of Glaslyn

Glaslyn (2016 population: 387) is a village in the Canadian province of Saskatchewan within the Rural Municipality of Parkdale No. 498 and Census Division No. 17. The village is located 67 kilometres (42 mi) north of the city of North Battleford and 91 kilometres (57 mi) south of Meadow Lake at the intersection of Highway 4 and Highway 3.

== History ==
Glaslyn incorporated as a village on April 16, 1929. Its name is Welsh for "clear water", after the Afon Glaslyn (River Glaslyn) in Wales.

== Demographics ==
Population history (1981–2016)
Year	Pop.	±%
1981	430	—
1986	480	+11.6%
1991	435	−9.4%
1996	374	−14.0%
2001	375	+0.3%
2006	369	−1.6%
2011	397	+7.6%
2016	387	−2.5%
Source: Statistics Canada via Saskatchewan Bureau of Statistics

In the 2021 Census of Population conducted by Statistics Canada, Glaslyn had a population of 353 living in 161 of its 180 total private dwellings, a change of −8.8% from its 2016 population of 387. With a land area of 1.91 km^{2} (0.74 sq mi), it had a population density of 184.8/km^{2} (478.7/sq mi) in 2021.

In the 2016 Census of Population, the Village of Glaslyn recorded a population of 387 living in 161 of its 179 total private dwellings, a −2.6% change from its 2011 population of 397. With a land area of 1.97 km^{2} (0.76 sq mi), it had a population density of 196.4/km^{2} (508.8/sq mi) in 2016.

== Recreation ==
The village has a hockey arena, bowling lanes, baseball diamonds as well as local parks and a regional park nearby.

- Glaslyn Minor Hockey
- Glaslyn Figure Skating Club
- Glaslyn Minor Ball Association
- Glaslyn Heritage Lanes
- Little Loon Regional Park

== Education ==
In Northwest School Division #203, Glaslyn Central School offers grades K-12 to about 115 students.

== See also ==
- List of communities in Saskatchewan
- List of villages in Saskatchewan
