= Turtle Lake (Saskatchewan) =

Lake in Saskatchewan, Canada

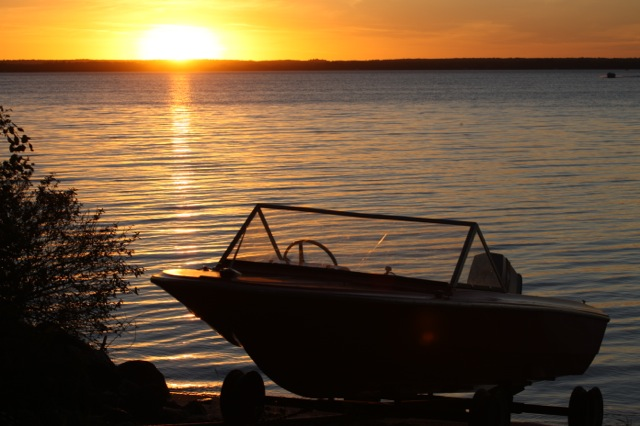
- Turtle Lake at sunset

- Location in Saskatchewan Turtle Lake (Canada)
- Location: RM of Parkdale No. 498 and RM of Mervin No. 499, Saskatchewan
- Coordinates: 53°34′N 108°39′W
- Part of: Saskatchewan River drainage basin
- Primary inflows: Warner River
- River sources: Meadow Lake Escarpment
- Primary outflows: Turtlelake River
- Basin countries: Canada
- Max. length: 21 km (13 mi)
- Max. width: 5 km (3.1 mi)
- Surface area: 6,772 ha (16,730 acres)
- Max. depth: 19.2 m (63 ft)
- Shore length^{1}: 58 km (36 mi)
- Surface elevation: 651 m (2,136 ft)
- Islands: Eyinatik Island
- Settlements: Turtle View
- ^{1} Shore length is not a well-defined measure.

Turtle Lake is a lake in the west-central part of the Canadian province of Saskatchewan. It is fairly long (about 21 km (13 mi)) while also narrow (about 5 km (3.1 mi) across). The closest town is Livelong and the closest cities are North Battleford, Meadow Lake, and Lloydminster. Turtle Lake is a heavily utilized recreational lake with campgrounds and small resort villages along its shores. Access to the lake and its amenities is from Highways 697 and 795.

Turtle Lake's primary outlet is the Turtlelake River, which flows south into the North Saskatchewan River near the Michaud Islands, across the river from Delmas. Warner River and Mikinak Lake are the primary inflows. The lake is situated at the southern slopes of the Meadow Lake Escarpment.

Locals tell stories of a monster of some sort in its waters. The Turtle Lake Monster stories go back many years.

== Communities ==
With over 1,500 cabins, Turtle Lake is dotted with several lakeside communities of cabin owners, including (clockwise from the north-east) Turtle View (which is an amalgamation of Turtle Lake Lodge and Indian Point – Golden Sands), Sunset View Beach, Evergreen Acres, Turtle Lake South Bay, Kopp's Kove, Aspen Cove, Parkland Beach, Powm Beach, Kivimaa-Moonlight Bay, and Horseshoe Bay. The Thunderchild 115C Indian reserve is on the north-western shore adjacent to Horseshoe Bay. Prior to 2010, Turtle Lake Lodge had a store and rental cabins with some facilities, since converted to residential lots. Prior to 2018, Moonlight Bay also had a small store with fuel sales available. Since those closures, South Bay is the only beach on the lake with store / gas / restaurant & lounge operations, open seasonally during summer.

== Recreation ==
Along Turtle Lake's shores are campgrounds, parks, golf courses, resorts, beaches, boat launches, and other amenities geared towards recreation.

Turtle Lake Recreation Site (53.6157°N 108.5826°W) is a 266-acre park on the north-eastern shore. It has a small campground, beach, and a boat launch. At the southern end of the lake is the 10-acre Turtle River Campground. It is in the community of Turtle Lake South Bay and adjacent to Turtlelake River. It has cabin rentals and a campground.

On the lake's eastern shore, between Indian Point – Golden Sands and Turtle Lake Lodge, is the 112-acre Turtle Lake Nature Sanctuary. The sanctuary has trails for wildlife viewing, hiking, cycling, and cross-country skiing.

Near Powm Beach is the 18-hole Blueberry Hill Golf Course and in Kivimaa-Moonlight Bay is the Kivimaa-Moonlight Bay mini golf.

== Fish species ==
Turtle Lake has several species of fish, including northern pike, walleye, perch, and whitefish.

=== Fish stocking ===
The fish stocking program at Turtle Lake started in 1950, and has been ongoing with some regularity over the past 80 years. Two species have been the focus of the stocking program in an effort to bolster their populations: walleye and lake whitefish.

Whitefish stocking started in 1927 and was discontinued in 1984. During this period, tens of millions of whitefish fry (newly hatched) were stocked. From 1932 to 1962, over 14 million walleye fry were stocked in the lake. The fisheries survey of 1964–65 indicated poor stocking success, so the stocking program was terminated. But due to high angler demand for walleye in the late 1960s, the walleye stocking program was re-introduced. From 1969 to 2004, another 22 million walleye fry as well as 461,300 walleye fingerlings (about 5 cm long) were stocked.

== Gallery ==
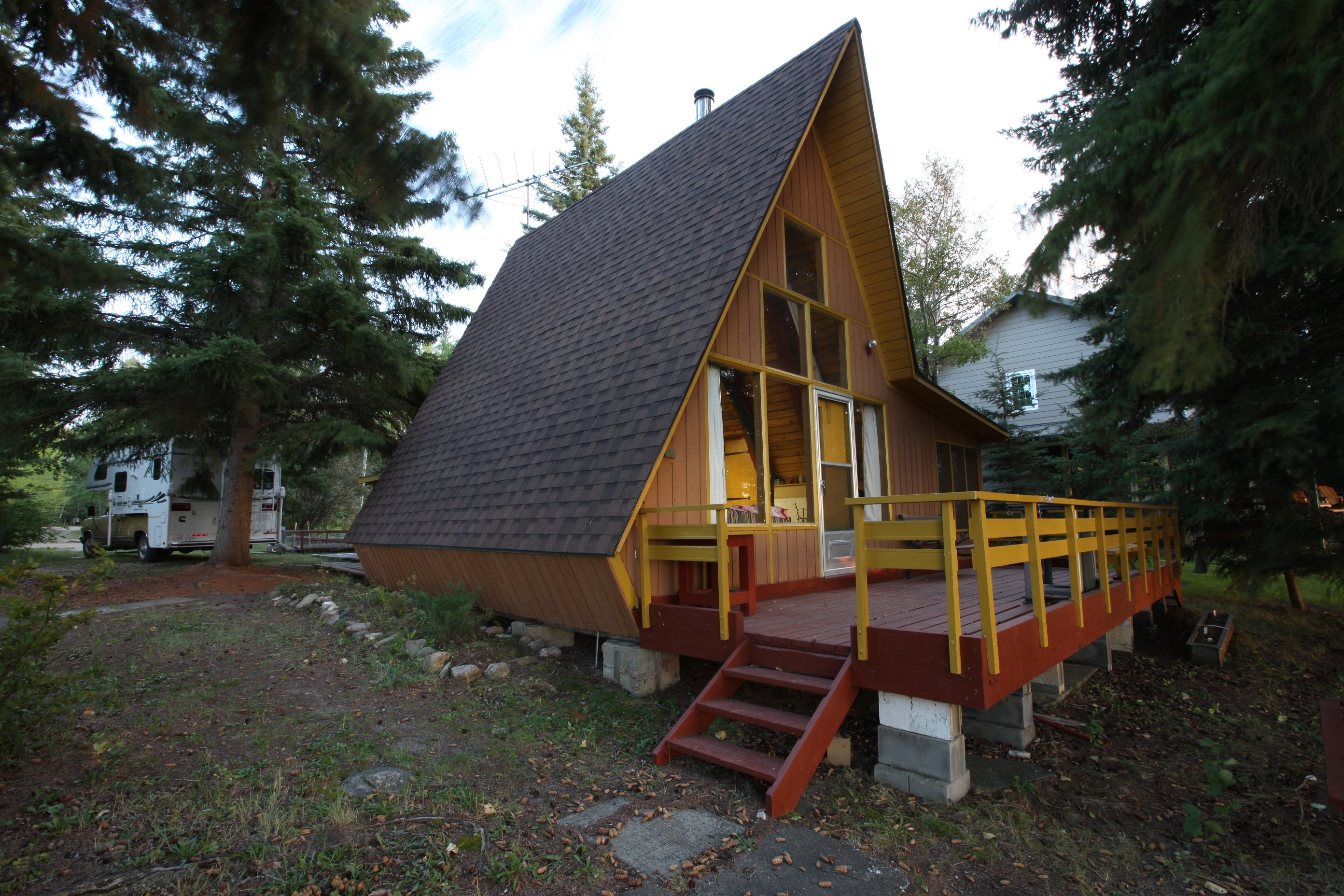
Classic A-Frame cabin Sunset View Beach

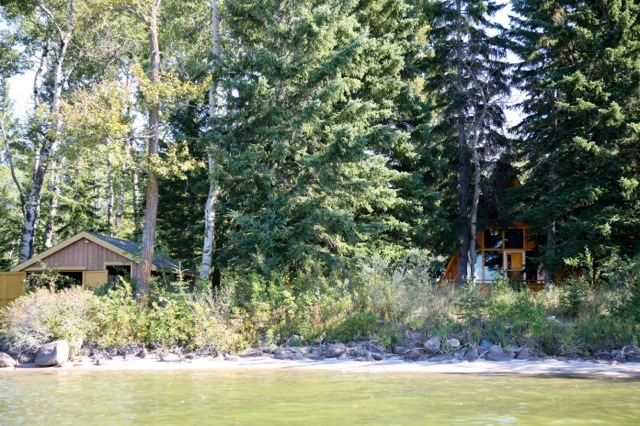
View of A Frame Cabin from water

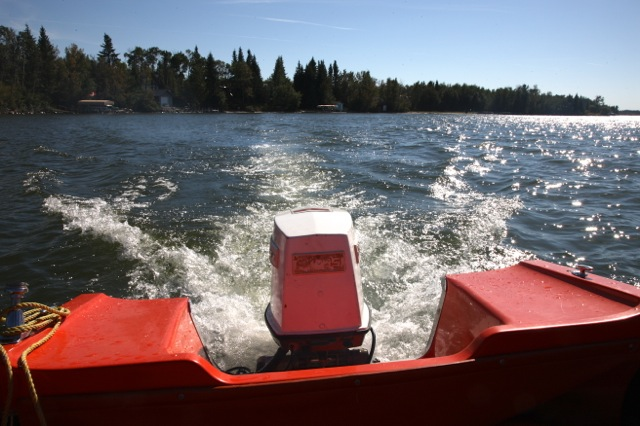
1972 Vanguard Boat

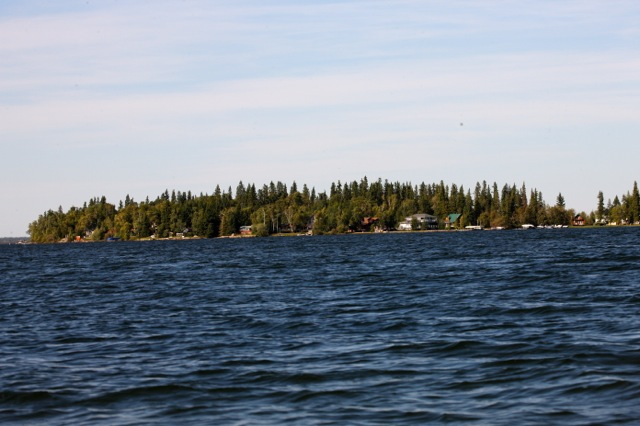
Indian point, Moes Beach

== See also ==
- List of lakes of Saskatchewan
- List of protected areas of Saskatchewan
