= Vawn, Saskatchewan =

Hamlet in Saskatchewan, Canada

Coordinates: 53°07′00″N 108°41′03″W

Vawn is a former village, now a hamlet, in the Canadian province of Saskatchewan. It was dissolved as a village in 2004; its population is now counted as part of the Rural Municipality of Turtle River No. 469. Vawn is located on Highway 26 about 52 kilometres (32 mi) north west of the city of North Battleford.

== History ==
Prior to February 15, 2004, Vawn was incorporated as a village, and was restructured as a hamlet under the jurisdiction of the Rural Municipality of Turtle River No. 469 on that date.

== Demographics ==
In the 2021 Census of Population conducted by Statistics Canada, Vawn had a population of 20 living in 12 of its 16 total private dwellings, a change of −59.2% from its 2016 population of 49. With a land area of 0.6 km^{2} (0.23 sq mi), it had a population density of 33.3/km^{2} (86.3/sq mi) in 2021.

== See also ==
- List of communities in Saskatchewan
- List of hamlets in Saskatchewan
