= Spruce Lake, Saskatchewan =

Community in Saskatchewan, Canada

Coordinates: 53°32′00″N 109°05′03″W

Location of Spruce Lake in Saskatchewan

Spruce Lake is an unincorporated community in west-central Saskatchewan. Access is from Highway 26.

== History ==
The area around Spruce Lake was first settled in 1910. Quite a large number of the first settlers were German. There were also several Scandinavians, British, Ukrainian, Polish, and French settlers. The Canadian Northern Railway (now the Canadian National Railway) came through in 1919 and the first grain elevator was built that year. Cattle was also shipped from Spruce Lake on the railway. The last remaining grain elevator burned down in 1983. Spruce Lake lost village status in 2006. The rail line that ran through the community was abandoned in 2005 and torn up in 2008.

== Demographics ==
In the 2021 Census of Population conducted by Statistics Canada, Spruce Lake had a population of 42 living in 23 of its 32 total private dwellings, a change of -23.6% from its 2016 population of 55. With a land area of 0.63 km^{2} (0.24 sq mi), it had a population density of 66.7/km^{2} (172.7/sq mi) in 2021.
