= Jackfish River =

River in Saskatchewan, Canada

- Location of the river's mouth in Saskatchewan Jackfish River (Canada)

Location
- Country: Canada
- Province: Saskatchewan

Physical characteristics
- Source: Jackfish Lake
  - location: RM of Meota No. 468, Saskatchewan
  - coordinates: 53.0209°N 108.3648°W
  - elevation: 528 m (1,732 ft)
- Mouth: North Saskatchewan River
  - location: RM of North Battleford No. 437, Saskatchewan
  - coordinates: 52.8862°N 108.4187°W
- Basin size: 3,730 km^{2} (1,440 sq mi)

Basin features
- River system: Saskatchewan River

Jackfish River is a river in the Canadian province of Saskatchewan. It begins at a control structure at the southern end of Jackfish Lake in the Rural Municipality of Meota No. 468 and flows south to the North Saskatchewan River in the Rural Municipality of North Battleford No. 437. The mouth is about 16 kilometres (9.9 mi) upstream from The Battlefords.

While there are no communities along the banks of the river, there are several communities, parks, and a migratory bird sanctuary within its watershed. Highway 26 crosses the river about 4.8 kilometres (3 mi) south of Jackfish Lake. In 1990, Ducks Unlimited Canada constructed a marsh along the northern part of Jackfish River.

== Jackfish River basin ==
The Jackfish River drainage basin is within the boreal parkland ecoregion of Saskatchewan and covers an area of 3,730 square kilometres (1,440 sq mi). Jackfish and Murray Lakes are important features in the basin as their total watershed area is 3,320 square kilometres (1,280 sq mi), which is 89% of Jackfish River's entire basin. Murray Lake has several small communities along its shores and is encompassed by Murray Lake Migratory Bird Sanctuary. Jackfish Lake, the larger of the two lakes, also has several small communities and two parks along its shores. The Battlefords Provincial Park is at the north-east corner of the lake, north of Cochin, while Meota Regional Park is along the southern shore at the village of Meota.

== Control structure ==
In 1932, a control structure (dam) was built at the southern end of Jackfish Lake — the start of the Jackfish River. The structure regulated the water levels of Jackfish and Murray Lakes. The Jackfish Lake Watershed Association Board (JLWAB) was formed in 1964 to "manage, construct, operate and maintain projects to control and develop the water resources of Jackfish and Murray Lakes". It is operated under the authority of the Saskatchewan Water Security Agency. The JLWAB replaced the original dam in 1966 and is tasked to regulate Jackfish Lake's water levels. It is licensed to maintain a maximum lake level of 529.44 metres (1,737.0 ft) and to supply downstream landowners with enough water.

After coming to an agreement with the JLWAB in 1988, Ducks Unlimited Canada (DUC) constructed a marsh project along Jackfish River, south of Jackfish Lake, in 1990. The JLWAB allotted DUC 1,000 dam^{3} (35,000,000 cu ft) per year to replenish the marsh, which was about the same amount the landowners downstream had received. Since then, though, an average of only 52.5 dam^{3} (1,850,000 cu ft) per year has been released to the marsh. This is due to "during past periods when the lakes were low, DUC voluntarily gave up all or a portion of its water allotment".

== Fish species ==
Fish commonly found in Jackfish River include walleye and lake sturgeon.

== See also ==
- List of rivers of Saskatchewan
- Dams and reservoirs in Saskatchewan
- Hudson Bay drainage basin
