= Moosomin First Nation =

Indian reserve in Saskatchewan, Canada

The Moosomin First Nation (Cree: ᒨᓱᒥᓂᕽ môsominihk) is a Cree First Nation band government in Cochin in the Canadian province of Saskatchewan. Its reserves are approximately 35 kilometres (22 mi) and 22 kilometres (14 mi) north of North Battleford. It borders the rural municipalities of Meota No. 468 and Round Hill No. 467. Moosomin First Nation has over 1,500 Band members and control of more than 50,000 acres (200 km^{2}) of land.

The First nation is named after Cree Chief ᒨᓱᒥᐣ môsomin. The name literally means "mooseberry or high bush cranberry".

== Name ==
Moosomin is the Cree word for the mooseberry.

== Indian reserves ==
The band governs thirteen Indian reserves:

- Moosomin Indian Reserve No. 112A, 259.8 ha (642 acres)
- Moosomin Indian Reserve No. 112B, 32 kilometres (20 mi) north of Battleford, 6,871.1 ha (16,979 acres)
- Moosomin Indian Reserve No. 112E, 129.5 ha (320 acres)
- Moosomin Indian Reserve No. 112F, 582 ha (1,440 acres).
- Moosomin Indian Reserve No. 112G, 37 kilometres (23 mi) of Spiritwood, 5,077.9 ha (12,548 acres)
- Moosomin Indian Reserve No. 112H, 37 kilometres (23 mi) west of Spiritwood, 2,042.9 ha (5,048 acres)
- Moosomin Indian Reserve No. 112J, 23 kilometres (14 mi) south-west of Spiritwood, 199 ha (490 acres)
- Moosomin Indian Reserve No. 112K, 129.5 ha (320 acres)
- Moosomin Indian Reserve No. 112L, 27 kilometres (17 mi) north-west of Blaine Lake, 2,069.2 ha (5,113 acres)
- Moosomin Indian Reserve No. 112M, 707.7 ha (1,749 acres)
- Moosomin Indian Reserve No. 112N, 64.8 ha (160 acres)
- Moosomin Indian Reserve No. 112P, 29 kilometres (18 mi) north of Hafford, 709 ha (1,750 acres)
- Moosomin Indian Reserve No. 112S, 126.6 ha (313 acres)

== History ==
Chief Moosomin signed Treaty 6 at Battleford in 1880. In August 2022, they became signatories to the Buffalo Treaty.

== See also ==
- List of Indian reserves in Saskatchewan
