= Cochin Bridge =

Cochin Bridge may refer to

- Cochin Bridge (Saskatchewan), bridge in Cochin, Saskatchewan, Canada
- Cochin Bridge (India), bridge in Kerala, India
