= Saskatchewan Highway 204 =

Provincial highway in Saskatchewan, Canada

Highway 204
- Bayview Heights Road

Route information
- Maintained by Ministry of Highways and Infrastructure
- Length: 5.1 km (3.2 mi)

Major junctions
- South end: Highway 4 north of Cochin
- North end: Bayview Heights in The Battlefords Provincial Park

Location
- Country: Canada
- Province: Saskatchewan
- Rural municipalities: Meota

Highway system
- Provincial highways in Saskatchewan
← Highway 202	→ Highway 209

Highway 204, also known as Bayview Heights Road, is a provincial highway in the Canadian province of Saskatchewan. Saskatchewan's 200-series highways primarily service its recreational areas. The highway is entirely within The Battlefords Provincial Park. It begins at Highway 4 north of Cochin and heads into the park where it provides access to its amenities. It is about 5 kilometres (3.1 mi) long.

In May 2022, the Saskatchewan government announced plans to repave and improve the highways in and around The Battlefords Provincial Park. This work — at a cost of $9.8 million — included a section of Highway 4, the entire 5 kilometres (3.1 mi) of Highway 204, and many of the roads and parking lots within the park. It was completed by the fall of that year.

== Major intersections ==
From west to east:

Rural municipality	Location	km	mi	Destinations	Notes
Meota No. 468	The Battlefords Provincial Park	0.0	0.0	Boat Launch / Highland Avenue – Bayview Heights	Western terminus
Meota No. 468	The Battlefords Provincial Park	3.8	2.4	Delorme Beach access road	
Meota No. 468	The Battlefords Provincial Park	4.9	3.0	The Battlefords Provincial Park main gate	
Meota No. 468	The Battlefords Provincial Park	5.1	3.2	Highway 4 – Meadow Lake, The Battlefords	Eastern terminus
1.000 mi = 1.609 km; 1.000 km = 0.621 mi
