= Saskatchewan Highway 4 =

Provincial highway in Saskatchewan, Canada

Highway 4
- Highway 4 highlighted in red

Route information
- Maintained by Saskatchewan Ministry of Highways and Infrastructure
- Length: 652.2 km (405.3 mi)

Major junctions
- South end: US 191 at the U.S. border at Monchy
- Highway 18 at Val Marie; Highway 13 in Cadillac; Highway 1 (TCH) in Swift Current; Highway 15 near Rosetown; Highway 7 in Rosetown; Highway 14 / Highway 51 in Biggar; Highway 16 (TCH/YH) / Highway 40 in The Battlefords; Highway 26 near North Battleford; Highway 3 in Glaslyn; Highway 55 at Meadow Lake
- North end: Highway 224 / Highway 904 in Meadow Lake Provincial Park

Location
- Country: Canada
- Province: Saskatchewan
- Major cities: Swift Current, North Battleford, Meadow Lake
- Towns: Rosetown, Biggar, Battleford

Highway system
- Provincial highways in Saskatchewan
← Highway 3	→ Highway 5

Highway 4 is a major north–south provincial highway in Saskatchewan, Canada. The highway runs from U.S. Route 191 at the Canada–US border crossing of Morgan–Monchy about 31 kilometres (19 mi) south of Val Marie to Highway 224 / Highway 904 in Meadow Lake Provincial Park. It is about 652 kilometres (405 mi) long.

Some of the major highways that 4 intersects include 18, 13, 1 (the Trans-Canada Highway), 7, 14, 16 (the Yellowhead Highway), and 3. It also passes through the cities of Swift Current, North Battleford, and Meadow Lake. Towns accessed from the highway include Rosetown, Biggar, and Battleford. Provincial parks along the highway's route include Saskatchewan Landing, Meadow Lake, and The Battlefords.

== History ==
Highway 4 was originally designated as Provincial Highway 1, while the present-day Highway 1 was designated as Provincial Highway 4. The designations were switched around c. 1940 to allow for the future Trans-Canada Highway to have the same number across Western Canada.

Highway 4 follows a similar routing as the historic Swift Current–Battleford Trail between Swift Current and Battleford.

== Route description ==
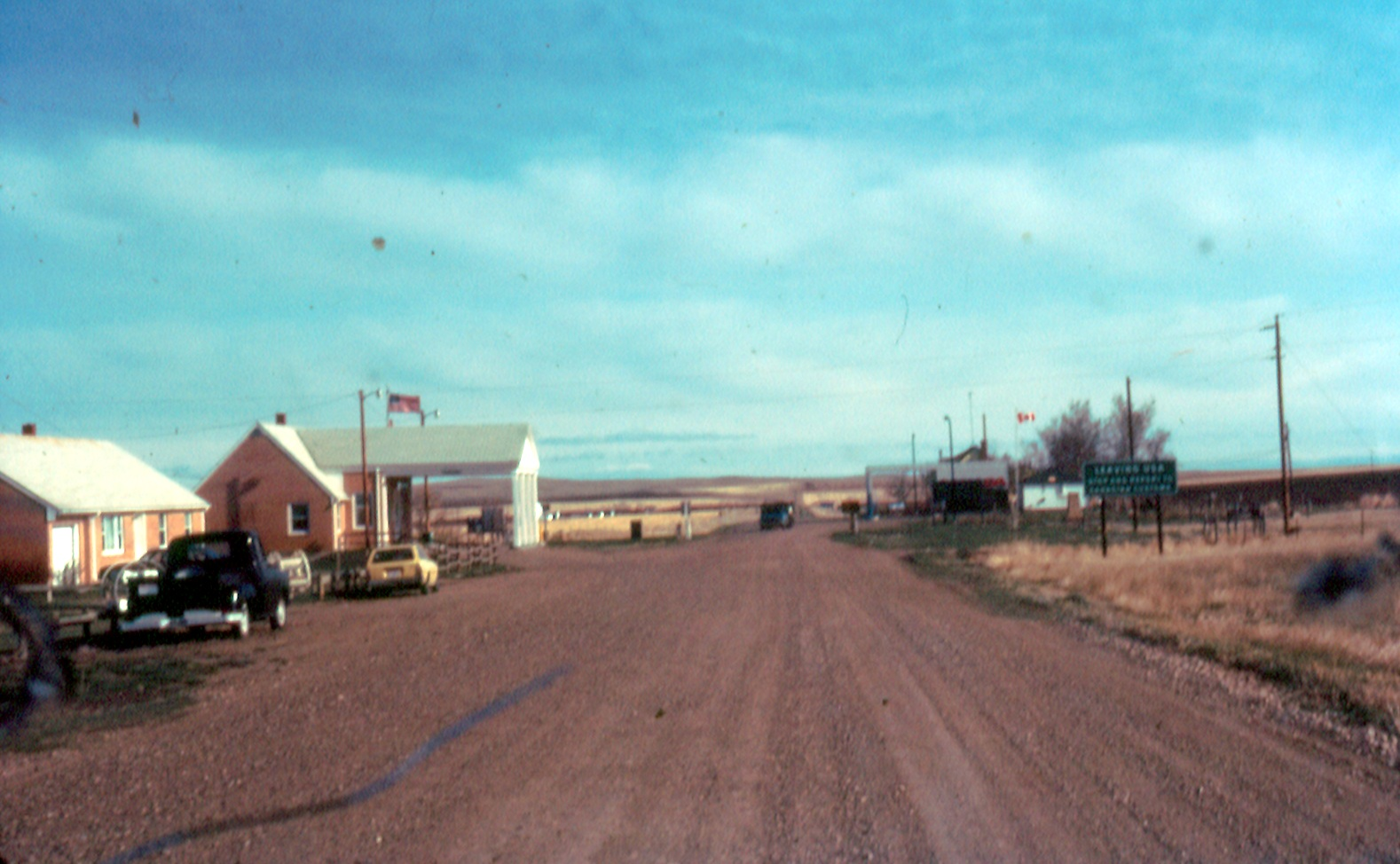
Morgan–Monchy Border Crossing in 1985

Highway 4 runs from the semi-arid hills of the Missouri Coteau near the Canada–U.S. border in the south, north to the boreal forest of central and northern Saskatchewan. The highway traverses hills, plateaus, a continental divide, and open prairie. It crosses several significant rivers, passes by large lakes, and provides access to several cities, towns, and parks.

=== U.S. border to Swift Current ===
Highway 4 begins in south-western Saskatchewan at the Canada–US border crossing of Morgan–Monchy, about 31 kilometres (19 mi) south of Val Marie. At the border crossing, the highway continues south into Montana as U.S. Route 191. Heading north, Highway 4 passes by the former community of Monchy en route to the east–west Highway 18. From the border to 18, it is about 15 kilometres (9.3 mi). Highway 18 and 4 then share a 16-kilometre (9.9 mi) long concurrency that heads north-east past the community of Masefield towards the West Block of Grasslands National Park. Once the highway reaches Highway 607, the access road to the park, it turns north to Val Marie. At Val Marie, the concurrency ends with 18 resuming its eastward travel and 4 continuing north. On the north side of town, Highway 4 crosses the Frenchman River, which is a major river in the region that has its source to the west in the Cypress Hills and its mouth to the south at the Milk River in Montana. Highway 4 continues north from Val Marie into the hills of the Missouri Coteau following Denniel Creek — a tributary of the Frenchman River — to the community of Beaver Valley. At Beaver Valley, Denniel Creek turns west while Highway 4 continues north for a further 29 kilometres (18 mi) to the village of Cadillac and Highway 13. The highway runs along the western side of Cadillac and intersects Highway 13 at the north-west corner of the village. From Cadillac, Highway 4 travels north for about 65 kilometres (40 mi) to Highway 1, the Trans-Canada Highway, in the city of Swift Current. Along the way, it crosses the continental divide and descends the northern slopes of the Missouri Coteau, roughly paralleling the north-flowing Swift Current Creek. Along this segment, Highway 4 provides access to the communities of Blumenort, Blumenhof, Wymark, Springfeld, and Schantzenfeld and intersects Highways 43, 343, 721, 379, and 363.

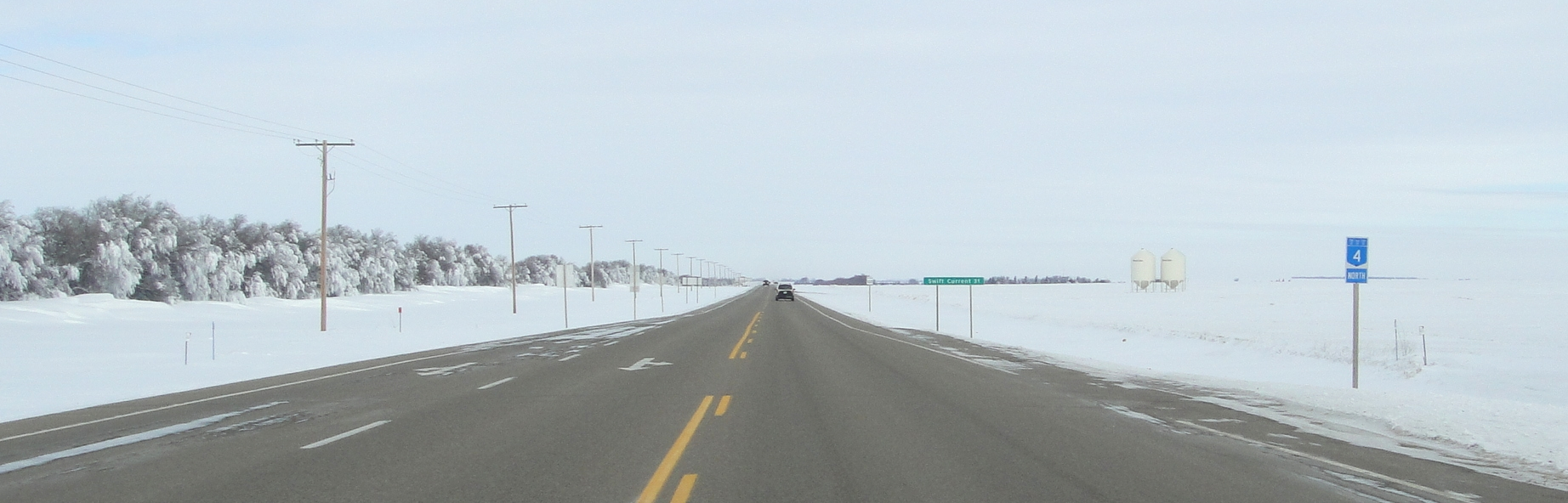
Highway 4 south of Swift Current, northbound

=== Swift Current ===
Highway 4 approaches Swift Current at the city's south-east corner. As the highway enters the city, it travels through an industrial area as Memorial Drive. It intersects several roads, including Airport Road, which leads out to Swift Current Airport. At that intersection with Airport Road, it crosses an aqueduct and then continues north across a set of railway tracks. A short distance later, it intersects Chaplin Street and Paterdon Drive at which point it also becomes 22nd Street NE. The highway continues north, then north-west passing by a housing subdivision, Swift Current Recreational Complex, and Elmwood Golfclub. It then crosses Swift Current Creek and has an interchange with Highway 1. On the north side of Highway 1, Highway 4 becomes four lanes for less than 400 metres (1,300 ft) as it has several intersections through a commercial area that includes Swift Current Mall, big-box stores, and Cypress Regional Hospital. The highway then turns west for almost a kilometre before coming to a stop sign at the intersection with Central Avenue N. At that intersection, Highway 4 turns north and leaves the city.

=== Swift Current to The Battlefords ===
After travelling north for 30 kilometres (19 mi) past Swift Current, Highway 4 bends to the north-west for 4 kilometres (2.5 mi) where it provides access to Stewart Valley, turns due east, and begins a 6.8-kilometre (4.2 mi) long concurrency with Highway 738. At the end of the concurrency, 738 continues east while 4 heads north-west into Saskatchewan Landing Provincial Park. The highway then meanders down into a valley where it crosses the western end of Lake Diefenbaker (South Saskatchewan River) via a causeway and bridge. Once across the lake, the highway climbs out of the valley, leaves the park, and resumes its northerly routing towards Kyle and Highway 342. Highway 342 heads east into the Coteau Hills where it provides access to Clearwater Lake Regional Park and the Matador Grassland. Travelling north of the Highway 342 intersection, Highway 4 provides access to Sanctuary (via Highway 647) and Elrose. Just north of Elrose, Highway 4 begins a 3.2-kilometre (2 mi) long northbound concurrency with Highway 44. From where 44 departs the concurrency and resumes its eastward travel, Highway 4 continues a further 30 kilometres (19 mi) north to the western terminus of Highway 15. About 5 kilometres (3.1 mi) north of that, Highway 4 meets Highway 7 at a four-way stop in Rosetown. Highway 7 is a major highway that connects the city of Saskatoon to points west in the province of Alberta. Highway 4 runs north along the western side of Rosetown providing access to many businesses and facilities, including the Rosetown Health Centre and Rosetown Central High School. Highway 4 leaves Rosetown heading north to Biggar. En route, it crosses Eagle Creek, intersects the eastern terminus of Highway 31, travels through Marriott at Highway 768, traverses the eastern slopes of The Bear Hills, and skirts around Richmond Lake.

Just south-west of Biggar, Highway 4 meets the eastern terminus of Highway 51, turns to the north-east, crosses four sets of railway tracks, and runs along the western side of town to Highway 14. At that intersection, the two highways begin a 1-kilometre (0.62 mi) long south south-eastbound concurrency that runs along the northern limits of Biggar. At Main Street, Highway 14 continues east while 4 turns north towards the North Saskatchewan River. The highway heads north through Monarchvale and then begins to bend to the north-west at Highway 784 west of Lizard Lake. Almost 8.5 kilometres (5.3 mi) later, it straightens out and heads west to Cando and Highway 655. From Cando, it turns north and heads into the Mosquito 109 and Grizzly Bear's Head 110 & Lean Man 111 Indian reserves. North of the Indian reserves, the highway crosses Cooper Creek and then Battle River. Once across the Battle River, it enters The Battlefords. "The Battlefords" is the collective name given to the adjacent communities of the city of North Battleford and the town of Battleford.

Once across Battle River, Highway 4 heads north towards the North Saskatchewan River where it goes from a two-lane highway to a four-lane one. Highway 4 passes by Fort Battleford National Historic Site, which is on the east side of the highway, just south of the town of Battleford. Highway 4 then runs along the western side of Battleford where it is joined by Highway 40. The two highways run concurrently to meet Highway 16 (the Yellowhead Highway) at an interchange. The three highways then run concurrently north-east across the North Saskatchewan River via the Battlefords Bridge. Once across the river, 16 and 40 veer off to the south-east while 4 continues into the city of North Battleford. It goes under a railway bridge and then comes to a four-way intersection controlled by traffic lights. Railway Avenue E approaches the intersection from the south, 11th Avenue from the east, and 100th Street from the north. Highway 4 turns north and heads out of the city as 100th Street. The road travels through commercial, residential, and light industrial as it heads out of the city. It is also at this point it returns to being a two-lane highway, almost 10 kilometres (6.2 mi) after the four-lane section started.

=== The Battlefords to Meadow Lake Provincial Park ===
From the city of North Battleford to the highway's northern terminus in Meadow Lake Provincial Park, it is about 194 kilometres (121 mi). Continuing north out of the city, Highway 4 intersects Highways 378 and 26 and provides access to Hamlin. North of the intersection with Highway 26, Highway 4 approaches Jackfish Lake, Murray Lake, and The Battlefords Provincial Park. The highway travels between the two lakes giving access to several lakeside communities, including Trevessa Beach, Summerfield Beach, Day's Beach, Pelican Point, West Chatfield Beach, Sleepy Hollow, Maymont Beach, and Cochin. North of Cochin, Highway 4 runs along the eastern boundary of The Battlefords Provincial Park. Highway 204, also known as Bayview Heights Road, branches off 4 into the park providing access to the amenities. North of the park, Highway 4 intersects Highway 674. Highway 674 heads west along the northern shore of Jackfish Lake. Highway 4 then ascends the Meadow Lake Escarpment en route to Meadow Lake. The divide between the Saskatchewan and Churchill Rivers is on the escarpment. Continuing north, the highway passes through Marlin and several small Indian reserves. It also has a 6.5-kilometre (4.0 mi) long concurrency with Highway 794. It then meets, and has a 1.6 kilometres (1 mi) long concurrency with, Highway 3 at Glaslyn. Highway 4 then continues north past Midnight Lake and enters the boreal forest. It continues north through the forested hills for about 70 kilometres (43 mi) en route to the city of Meadow Lake. As the highway approaches the city, it descends from the Meadow Lake Escarpment, crosses Nolin Creek, and intersects Highway 304 and Highway 799. It then travels past Meadow Lake Golf Club and runs along the western side of Meadow Lake providing access to commercial and light industrial neighbourhoods. At the north-western part of the city, it meets, and begins a 9.8-kilometre (6.1 mi) long concurrency with, Highway 55 (Northern Woods and Water Route) that first goes north then west. Highway 55 continues west while 4 turns north towards Meadow Lake Provincial Park and its northern terminus.

The final leg of Highway 4 is about 31 kilometres (19 mi) long. It crosses the Beaver River and then passes through the village of Dorintosh (where it intersects Highway 779). About 6 kilometres (3.7 mi) north of Dorintosh, the highway enters Meadow Lake Provincial Park. Shortly thereafter, it crosses the Waterhen River and ends at the junction of Highway 224 and Highway 904.

== Highway 4S ==
Several maps, such as MapArt's mapbook of Saskatchewan cities and towns shows a Highway 4S spur heading east from the intersection of Highway 4 in Swift Current to the city's airport, following Airport Road. The roadway is not designated Highway 4S on the Saskatchewan Highway's Official Highway Map.

== Major intersections ==
From south to north:

Rural municipality	Location	km	mi	Destinations	Notes
Val Marie No. 17	Monchy	0.0	0.0	US 191 south – Malta, Lewistown	Continuation into Montana
Val Marie No. 17	Monchy	0.0	0.0	Canada–United States border at Morgan–Monchy Border Crossing	
Val Marie No. 17		16.4	10.2	Highway 18 west – Orkney, Climax	South of Masefield; south end of Highway 18 concurrency
Val Marie No. 17		25.6	15.9	Highway 607 east – Grasslands National Park (West Block)	
Val Marie No. 17	Val Marie	31.2	19.4	Highway 18 east – Mankota, Grasslands National Park (East Block)	North end of Highway 18 concurrency
Wise Creek No. 77		76.2	47.3	Highway 722 west – Shaunavon	
Wise Creek No. 77	Cadillac	85.9	53.4	Highway 13 (Red Coat Trail) – Shaunavon, Assiniboia, Weyburn	
Lac Pelletier No. 107		112.2	69.7	Highway 43 east – Vanguard, Gravelbourg	
Lac Pelletier No. 107		118.7	73.8	Highway 343 west / Blumenort access road – Simmie, Blumenort	
Swift Current No. 137		128.4	79.8	Highway 379 east / Highway 721 – McMahon	
Swift Current No. 137		141.3	87.8	Highway 363 east – Hodgeville	
City of Swift Current		148.1	92.0	South Railway Street / Airport Road	Unofficial Highway 4S
City of Swift Current		148.5	92.3	Chaplin Street E – City Centre	
City of Swift Current		150.9	93.8	Highway 1 (TCH) – Medicine Hat, Moose Jaw	Interchange
City of Swift Current		152.4	94.7	Central Avenue to Highway 1 west – City Centre, Medicine Hat	
Saskatchewan Landing No. 167		171.9	106.8	Highway 736 east	
Saskatchewan Landing No. 167	Stewart Valley	185.6	115.3	Highway 738 east	South end of Highway 738 concurrency
Saskatchewan Landing No. 167		192.3	119.5	Highway 738 west – Cabri	North end of Highway 738 concurrency
↑ / ↓	Saskatchewan Landing Provincial Park	199.8	124.1	Saskatchewan Landing Bridge across Lake Diefenbaker (South Saskatchewan River)	
Lacadena No. 228	Kyle	221.3	137.5		
Lacadena No. 228		224.9	139.7	Highway 342 – Eston, Beechy	
Lacadena No. 228		239.6	148.9	Highway 647 west – Lacadena	
Monet No. 257		261.5	162.5	Highway 751 east	
Monet No. 257	Elrose	264.7	164.5	Highway 44 west – Eston	South end of Highway 44 concurrency
Monet No. 257		268.0	166.5	Highway 44 east – Dinsmore, Davidson	North end of Highway 44 concurrency
Monet No. 257		271.3	168.6	Highway 752 west – McMorran	
St. Andrews No. 287		297.7	185.0	Highway 15 east – Outlook	
St. Andrews No. 287	Rosetown	302.6	188.0	Highway 7 – Calgary, Kindersley, Saskatoon	
Marriott No. 317		314.3	195.3	Highway 31 west – Kerrobert	
Marriott No. 317	Marriott	330.5	205.4	Highway 768 east – Tessier	
Biggar No. 347	Biggar	359.9	223.6	Highway 51 west – Kerrobert	
Biggar No. 347	Biggar	361.0	224.3	Highway 14 west – Wilkie, Unity	South end of Highway 14 concurrency
Biggar No. 347	Biggar	362.0	224.9	Highway 14 east – Saskatoon	North end of Highway 14 concurrency
Glenside No. 377		390.9	242.9	Highway 784 east – Struan	South end of Highway 784 concurrency
Rosemount No. 378	Cando	409.4	254.4	Highway 656 south – Landis	
Buffalo No. 409	Red Pheasant 108	417.1	259.2	Highway 784 west to Highway 656 north – Wilkie	North end of Highway 784 concurrency
Battle River No. 438		448.3	278.6	Highway 656 south	
Battle River No. 438		448.5	278.7	Crosses Battle River	
Town of Battleford		450.7	280.1	Highway 40 west (Poundmaker Trail) to Highway 29 / 22nd Street – Wilkie, Cut Knife, Wainwright	South end of Highway 40 concurrency; former Highway 16A east
Town of Battleford		452.6	281.2	Highway 16 (TCH/YH) west – Lloydminster, Edmonton	Interchange; south end of Highway 16 concurrency
↑ / ↓		453.4	281.7	Battlefords Bridge over North Saskatchewan River	
City of North Battleford		454.3	282.3	Highway 16B (TCH) begins / Highway 16 (TCH/YH) east / Highway 40 east – Prince Albert, Saskatoon	Interchange; northbound exit and southbound entrance; north end of Highway 16 / Highway 40 concurrency; south end of Highway 16B concurrency
City of North Battleford		455.1	282.8	Territorial Drive to Highway 4 north – Meadow Lake	North Battleford bypass
City of North Battleford		455.5	283.0	100 Street / Railway Avenue (Highway 16B (TCH) east) / 11 Avenue	North end of Highway 16B concurrency; Highway 4 follows 100 Street
City of North Battleford		457.5	284.3	Territorial Drive to Highway 4 south / Highway 16 (TCH) / Highway 40 – Saskatoon, Battleford, Lloydminster	North Battleford bypass
North Battleford No. 437		463.1	287.8	Highway 378 east – Rabbit Lake, Spiritwood	
Meota No. 468		472.8	293.8	Highway 750 east – Whitkow	
Meota No. 468		476.1	295.8	Highway 26 north – Turtleford	
Meota No. 468		482.6	299.9	Metinota Access Road	Road accesses the south shore of Jackfish Lake
Meota No. 468	Cochin	490.0	304.5	Highway 769 east – Rabbit Lake	South end of Highway 769 concurrency
Meota No. 468	The Battlefords Provincial Park	493.4	306.6	Highway 204 west (Bayview Heights Road) – Bayview Heights, The Battlefords Provincial Park	
Meota No. 468		497.7	309.3	Highway 769 west – Aquadeo	North end of Highway 769 concurrency
Parkdale No. 498		513.1	318.8	Highway 794 east – Medstead	South end of Highway 794 concurrency
Parkdale No. 498		519.6	322.9	Highway 794 west – Turtleford	North end of Highway 794 concurrency
Parkdale No. 498	Glaslyn	522.0	324.4	Highway 3 east – Prince Albert	South end of Highway 3 concurrency
Parkdale No. 498	Glaslyn	523.5	325.3	Highway 3 west – Turtleford	North end of Highway 3 concurrency
Meadow Lake No. 588		605.8	376.4	Highway 304 west – Loon Lake Highway 799 east	
City of Meadow Lake		611.9	380.2	Highway 55 east (1 Avenue W / NWWR) – Green Lake, Prince Albert	South end Highway 55 concurrency
Meadow Lake No. 588		621.7	386.3	Highway 55 west (NWWR) – Pierceland, Cold Lake	North end Highway 55 concurrency
Meadow Lake No. 588		638.1	396.5	Crosses Beaver River	
Meadow Lake No. 588	Dorintosh	645.0	400.8	Highway 779 west – Peerless	
Meadow Lake No. 588	Meadow Lake Provincial Park	652.2	405.3	Highway 224 west / Highway 904 north – Greig Lake	Northern terminus
1.000 mi = 1.609 km; 1.000 km = 0.621 mi: Concurrency terminus; Incomplete access; Route transition

== See also ==
- Transportation in Saskatchewan
- Roads in Saskatchewan
