= Lanz Point =

Community in Saskatchewan, Canada

- Hamlet
- Location of Lanz Point
- Coordinates: 53°01′51″N 108°17′23″W
- Country: Canada
- Province: Saskatchewan
- Census division: 17
- Rural Municipality: Meota No. 468

Population (2006)
  - Total: 35
- Time zone: CST
- Postal code: S0M 1X0
- Area code: 306

Lanz Point is a hamlet in the Canadian province of Saskatchewan. It is on the southern shore of Murray Lake within the Rural Municipality of Meota No. 468.

== Demographics ==
In the 2021 Census of Population conducted by Statistics Canada, Lanz Point had a population of 56 living in 23 of its 64 total private dwellings, a change of 51.4% from its 2016 population of 37. With a land area of 0.12 km^{2} (0.046 sq mi), it had a population density of 466.7/km^{2} (1,208.7/sq mi) in 2021.

== See also ==
- List of communities in Saskatchewan
