= Division No. 17, Saskatchewan =

Census division in Canada

Coordinates: 53°05′14″N 109°17′34″W

Division No. 17
- Census division in Saskatchewan
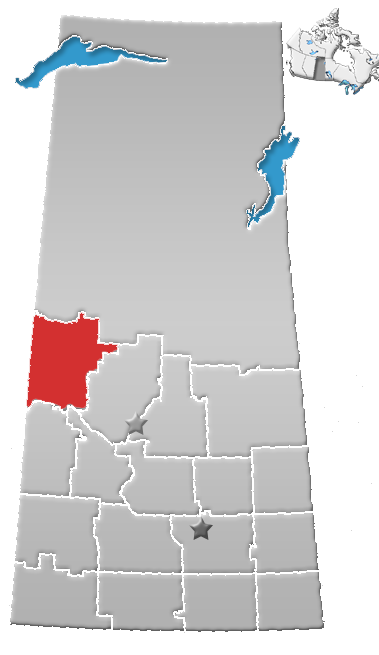
- Country: Canada
- Province: Saskatchewan

Area
  - Total: 22,457.10 km^{2} (8,670.73 sq mi)
- As of 2016

Population (2016)
  - Total: 47,900
  - Density: 2.13/km^{2} (5.52/sq mi)

Division No. 17 is one of eighteen census divisions in the province of Saskatchewan, Canada, as defined by Statistics Canada. It is located in the west-northwest part of the province, bordering Alberta. The most populous community in this division is the interprovincial city of Lloydminster. Another important population centre is the town of Meadow Lake.

== Demographics ==
In the 2021 Census of Population conducted by Statistics Canada, Division No. 17 had a population of 47,834 living in 17,565 of its 23,104 total private dwellings, a change of −0.1% from its 2016 population of 47,900. With a land area of 22,222.67 km^{2} (8,580.22 sq mi), it had a population density of 2.2/km^{2} (5.6/sq mi) in 2021.

== Census subdivisions ==
The following census subdivisions (municipalities or municipal equivalents) are located within Saskatchewan's Division No. 17.

=== Cities ===
- Lloydminster
- Meadow Lake

=== Towns ===
- Lashburn
- Maidstone
- Marshall
- St. Walburg
- Turtleford

=== Villages ===
- Dorintosh
- Edam
- Glaslyn
- Goodsoil
- Loon Lake
- Makwa
- Meota
- Mervin
- Paradise Hill
- Paynton
- Pierceland
- Waseca

=== Resort villages ===
- Aquadeo
- Cochin
- Greig Lake
- Kivimaa-Moonlight Bay
- Metinota

=== Rural municipalities ===
- RM No. 468 Meota
- RM No. 469 Turtle River
- RM No. 470 Paynton
- RM No. 471 Eldon
- RM No. 472 Wilton
- RM No. 498 Parkdale
- RM No. 499 Mervin
- RM No. 501 Frenchman Butte
- RM No. 502 Brittania
- RM No. 561 Loon Lake
- RM No. 588 Meadow Lake
- RM No. 622 Beaver River

=== Indian reserves ===
- Big Island Lake Cree Nation
- Eagles Lake 165C
- Flying Dust 105
- Makaoo 120
- Makwa Lake 129
- Makwa Lake 129A
- Makwa Lake 129B
- Makwa Lake 129C
- Meadow Lake 105A
- Min-A-He-Quo-Sis 116C
- Ministikwan 161
- Ministikwan 161A
- Moosomin 112B
- Saulteaux 159
- Seekaskootch 119
- Thunderchild First Nation 115B
- Thunderchild First Nation 115C
- Thunderchild First Nation 115D
- Waterhen 130

== See also ==
- List of census divisions of Saskatchewan
- List of communities in Saskatchewan
