= The Battlefords Provincial Park =

Provincial park in Saskatchewan, Canada

- Location within Saskatchewan Location within Canada
- Interactive map of The Battlefords Provincial Park
- Location: Saskatchewan, Canada
- Nearest city: North Battleford
- Coordinates: 53.1176°N 108.3743°W
- Established: 1960
- Governing body: Sask Parks

The Battlefords Provincial Park is a recreational provincial park in the Canadian Province of Saskatchewan. It is about 39 kilometres (24 mi) north of the city of North Battleford in the RM of Meota No. 468 on Jackfish Lake. Highway 4 runs north from North Battleford to the park and Highway 204 runs through the park providing access to the amenities.

The park is set in forested, rolling hills on Robinson Bay at the north-east corner of Jackfish Lake. Bayview Heights is a hamlet at the northern end of the park and the resort villages of Cochin (to the south) and Aquadeo (to the north) are on either side of the park.

== Attractions and amenities ==
The Battlefords Provincial Park is a recreational park that has a campground with over 300 campsites, a golf course, beach access, hiking, and boating.

The campground consists of 317 individual campsites, 165 of which are electrified, and eight group sites. Nearby the campgrounds, there are modern washroom / shower facilities, a store, laundry, concession, the beach, and picnic areas. Other activities at the park include mini-golf, hiking, water sports, fishing, boating, and mountain biking. In the winter, there's ice fishing and 25 kilometres (16 mi) of marked and groomed cross-country ski trails.

Just off shore, Sask Aquatic Adventures has a water adventure park set up. It is one of several in Saskatchewan.

== Jackfish Lodge Golf and Conference Centre ==
Jackfish Lodge Golf and Conference Centre is a par 72 (ladies' 74), 18-hole championship golf course on Jackfish Lake in the Battlefords Provincial Park. The golf course features a conference room, driving range, pro shop, 58-room hotel, boardrooms, banquet room, beach access, and a restaurant.

== See also ==
- List of protected areas of Saskatchewan
- Tourism in Saskatchewan
