= Saulteaux First Nation =

First Nation band government in Canada

Coordinates: 53°08′31″N 108°18′43″W

Saulteaux First Nation (Ojibwe: Ginoozhe-zaaga'iganiing Nakawewag, "the Saulteaux at Jackfish Lake") is a Saulteaux Anishinaabe First Nation band government, whose reserves are located near Cochin, Saskatchewan. In February 2012, the First Nation had a total of 1,225 registered members, of whom 604 lived on their own reserve.

== Reserves ==
The Saulteaux First Nation have reserved for themselves 40 discontinuous parcels ranging from 0.2 hectares (0.49 acres) to 3,796.2 hectares (9,381 acres) in size for a total 17,392 hectares (42,980 acres). Of these tracts, the 3,796.2 hectares (9,381 acres) Saulteaux Indian Reserve 159 serves as their main reserve.

== Government ==
Under the Canadian Indian Act, the First Nation elects their leadership under the Custom Electoral System. Their current elected officials are Chief Kenny Moccasin and five councillors: Jordan Gopher, Rebecca Gopher, Adam Houle, Dolphus Moccasin, Gabriel Moccasin .

The First Nation government provides infrastructure to their member; the infrastructure includes a band office, band hall, fire hall, school, clinic, arena, and various structures required for the band's maintenance. In turn, the Saulteaux First Nation's council is a member of the Battlefords Agency Tribal Chiefs, a local Chief Council, who together with other members, provide additional services to their constituency. In turn, the First Nation is also a member of the Confederacy of Treaty Six First Nations, a Tribal Political Organisation representing First Nations who are signatories to Treaty 6.

== History ==
In August 2022, they became a signatory of the Buffalo Treaty.
