= Jackfish Lake, Saskatchewan =

Hamlet in Saskatchewan, Canada

Jackfish Lake
- Hamlet
- Location within Saskatchewan Location within Canada
- Coordinates: 53.083455°N 108.292788°W
- Country: Canada
- Province: Saskatchewan
- Region: North-central
- Census division: 16
- Rural municipality: Meota No. 468

Government
  - Governing body: Meoto No. 468
- Elevation: 542 m (1,778 ft)
- Time zone: CST
- Area code: 306
- Highways: Highway 697

Jackfish Lake is a hamlet in the Rural Municipality of Meota No. 468, Saskatchewan, Canada. The hamlet is located north of Jackfish Lake, at the junction of L'Heureux Road and Jackfish Road. It is approximately 48 kilometres (30 mi) north of the city of North Battleford.

== See also ==
- List of communities in Saskatchewan
