= Cochin Bridge (Saskatchewan) =

Bridge in Saskatchewan, Canada

- Coordinates: 53.0799°N 108.3371°W
- Carries: Pedestrian (current); Road (former)
- Crosses: Lehman Creek
- Locale: Cochin, Saskatchewan, Canada
- Website: www.cochinbridge.com

Characteristics
- Design: Rainbow arch
- Material: Reinforced Concrete

History
- Construction end: July, 1926
- Closed: 1989 (road traffic)

Location
- Interactive map of Cochin Bridge

The Cochin Bridge spans Lehman Creek in Cochin, Saskatchewan, Canada. Lehman Creek is a channel that connects Jackfish Lake and Murray Lake. The bridge was originally referred to as Jackfish Lake Narrows Bridge. The bridge was constructed by John Kenward (a concrete contractor from Regina) based on a James Barney Marsh double arch design. The bridge served as the main entrance into Cochin as part of Highway 4 until 1962 when a new bridge was constructed and the highway realigned. The bridge continued to serve local traffic until 1989 when it became a pedestrian only bridge.

== See also ==
- List of bridges in Canada
