= Sleepy Hollow, Saskatchewan =

Community in Saskatchewan, Canada

Coordinates: 53°03′53″N 108°19′22″W

Sleepy Hollow is a hamlet in the Canadian province of Saskatchewan. It is on the western shore of Murray Lake within the Rural Municipality of Meota No. 468. Access is from Highway 4.

== Demographics ==
In the 2021 Census of Population conducted by Statistics Canada, Sleepy Hollow had a population of 29 living in 11 of its 26 total private dwellings, a change of 61.1% from its 2016 population of 18. With a land area of 0.04 km^{2} (0.015 sq mi), it had a population density of 725.0/km^{2} (1,877.7/sq mi) in 2021.

== See also ==
- List of communities in Saskatchewan
