= Moosomin 112G =

Indian reserve in Saskatchewan, Canada

Coordinates: 53°17′13″N 107°57′34″W

- Indian reserve
- Moosomin Indian Reserve No. 112G
- Location in Saskatchewan
- First Nation: Moosomin
- Country: Canada
- Province: Saskatchewan

Area
  - Total: 5,270.9 ha (13,025 acres)

Moosomin 112G is an Indian reserve of the Moosomin First Nation in Saskatchewan, Canada. It is about 32 kilometres (20 mi) west of Spiritwood.

== See also ==
- List of Indian reserves in Saskatchewan
