= Pelican Point, Saskatchewan =

Organized hamlet in Saskatchewan, Canada

Coordinates: 53°03′02″N 108°19′07″W

Pelican Point is a hamlet in the Canadian province of Saskatchewan. It is on the western shore of Murray Lake within the Rural Municipality of Meota No. 468. Access is from Highway 4.

== Demographics ==
In the 2021 Census of Population conducted by Statistics Canada, Pelican Point had a population of 50 living in 23 of its 58 total private dwellings, a change of 72.4% from its 2016 population of 29. With a land area of 0.25 km^{2} (0.097 sq mi), it had a population density of 200.0/km^{2} (518.0/sq mi) in 2021.

== See also ==
- List of communities in Saskatchewan
