= Day's Beach =

Hamlet in Saskatchewan, Canada

Coordinates: 53°03′20″N 108°20′45″W

Day's Beach is a hamlet in the Canadian province of Saskatchewan. It is within the Rural Municipality of Meota No. 468. Access is from Highway 4.

== Geography ==
It is on the eastern shore of Jackfish Lake.

== Demographics ==
In the 2021 Census of Population conducted by Statistics Canada, Day's Beach had a population of 43 living in 24 of its 60 total private dwellings, a change of 22.9% from its 2016 population of 35. With a land area of 0.26 km^{2} (0.10 sq mi), it had a population density of 165.4/km^{2} (428.3/sq mi) in 2021.

== See also ==
- List of communities in Saskatchewan
