= Moosomin 112P =

Indian reserve in Saskatchewan, Canada

Coordinates: 52°55′22″N 107°17′30″W

- Indian reserve
- Moosomin Indian Reserve No. 112P
- Location in Saskatchewan
- First Nation: Moosomin
- Country: Canada
- Province: Saskatchewan

Area
  - Total: 838.4 ha (2,072 acres)

Moosomin 112P is an Indian reserve of the Moosomin First Nation in Saskatchewan. It is about 29 kilometres (18 mi) north of Hafford.

== See also ==
- List of Indian reserves in Saskatchewan
