= Moosomin 112H =

Indian reserve in Saskatchewan, Canada

Coordinates: 53°04′01″N 108°00′14″W

- Indian reserve
- Moosomin Indian Reserve No. 112H
- Location in Saskatchewan
- First Nation: Moosomin
- Country: Canada
- Province: Saskatchewan

Area
  - Total: 2,042.9 ha (5,048 acres)

Moosomin 112H is an Indian reserve of the Moosomin First Nation in Saskatchewan. It is about 37 kilometres (23 mi) west of Spiritwood.

== See also ==
- List of Indian reserves in Saskatchewan
