= Moosomin 112J =

Indian reserve in Saskatchewan, Canada

Coordinates: 53°12′50″N 107°44′44″W

- Indian reserve
- Moosomin Indian Reserve No. 112J
- Location in Saskatchewan
- First Nation: Moosomin
- Country: Canada
- Province: Saskatchewan

Area
  - Total: 199 ha (490 acres)

Moosomin 112J is an Indian reserve of the Moosomin First Nation in Saskatchewan. It is about 23 kilometres (14 mi) south-west of Spiritwood.

== See also ==
- List of Indian reserves in Saskatchewan
