= Trevessa Beach =

Organized hamlet in Saskatchewan, Canada

Coordinates: 53°02′05″N 108°20′34″W

Trevessa Beach is a hamlet in the Canadian province of Saskatchewan. It is within the Rural Municipality of Meota No. 468 on the eastern shore of Jackfish Lake. Access is from Highway 4.

== Demographics ==
In the 2021 Census of Population conducted by Statistics Canada, Trevessa Beach had a population of 52 living in 28 of its 41 total private dwellings, a change of -13.3% from its 2016 population of 60. With a land area of 0.19 km^{2} (0.073 sq mi), it had a population density of 273.7/km^{2} (708.8/sq mi) in 2021.

== See also ==
- List of communities in Saskatchewan
