= Summerfield Beach =

Community in Saskatchewan, Canada

Coordinates: 53°02′18″N 108°18′31″W

Summerfield Beach is a hamlet in the Canadian province of Saskatchewan. It is on the western shore of Murray Lake within the Rural Municipality of Meota No. 468. Access is from Highway 4.

== Demographics ==
In the 2021 Census of Population conducted by Statistics Canada, Summerfield Beach had a population of 44 living in 16 of its 39 total private dwellings, a change of 2.3% from its 2016 population of 43. With a land area of 0.33 km^{2} (0.13 sq mi), it had a population density of 133.3/km^{2} (345.3/sq mi) in 2021.

== See also ==
- List of communities in Saskatchewan
