= West Chatfield Beach =

Community in Saskatchewan, Canada

Coordinates: 53°03′46″N 108°20′42″W

West Chatfield Beach is a hamlet in the Canadian province of Saskatchewan. It is within the Rural Municipality of Meota No. 468 on the eastern shore of Jackfish Lake. Access is from Highway 4.

== Demographics ==
In the 2021 Census of Population conducted by Statistics Canada, West Chatfield Beach had a population of 29 living in 14 of its 43 total private dwellings, a change of 26.1% from its 2016 population of 23. With a land area of 0.1 km^{2} (0.039 sq mi), it had a population density of 290.0/km^{2} (751.1/sq mi) in 2021.

== See also ==
- List of communities in Saskatchewan
