= Maymont Beach =

Community in Saskatchewan, Canada

Coordinates: 53°04′01″N 108°19′48″W

Maymont Beach is a hamlet in the Canadian province of Saskatchewan. It is on the western shore of Murray Lake within the Rural Municipality of Meota No. 468. Access is from Highway 4.

== Demographics ==
In the 2021 Census of Population conducted by Statistics Canada, Maymont Beach had a population of 36 living in 19 of its 45 total private dwellings, a change of 2.9% from its 2016 population of 35. With a land area of 0.19 km^{2} (0.073 sq mi), it had a population density of 189.5/km^{2} (490.7/sq mi) in 2021.

== See also ==
- List of communities in Saskatchewan
