= Meota =

Village in Saskatchewan, Canada

- Village
- Village of Meota
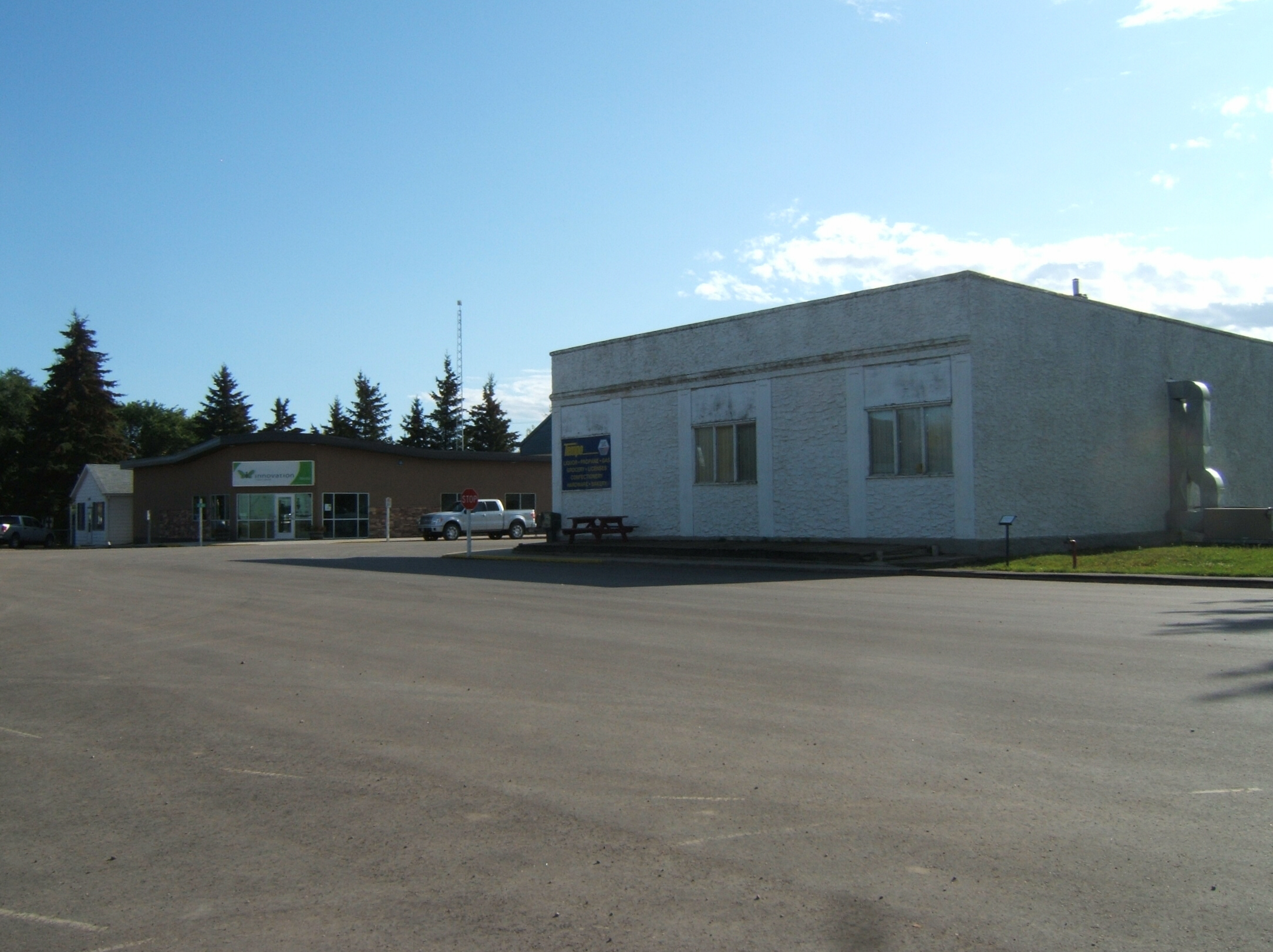
- Meota business district
- Motto: It is good here!
- Location within Meota No. 468 Location within Saskatchewan Location within Canada
- Coordinates: 53°02′09″N 108°27′17″W
- Country: Canada
- Province: Saskatchewan
- Region: Northwest
- Census division: 17
- Rural Municipality: Meota No. 468
- Established: 1894
- Incorporated (Village): February 1, 1911

Government
  - Mayor: Derek Welford
  - Administrator: Kristen Tokaryk
  - Governing body: Meota Village Council

Area
  - Total: 1.55 km^{2} (0.60 sq mi)

Population (2021)
  - Total: 325
  - Density: 191.9/km^{2} (497/sq mi)
- Time zone: CST
- Postal code: S0M 1X0
- Area code: 306
- Highways: Highway 26
- Railways: Canadian Northern Railway

Meota (2021 population: 325) is a village in the Canadian province of Saskatchewan within the Rural Municipality of Meota No. 468 and Census Division No. 17. The village name is derived from the Cree phrase Meotate or Mo-Was-In-Ota, meaning "good place to camp" or "it is good here."

Meota is on the south-western shore of Jackfish Lake and is accessed from Highway 26. Meota Regional Park is adjacent to the community.

== History ==
A post office named Meota was established in 1894, but it was located where the present-day community of Metinota is, leading to some confusion over the origins of the current village of Meota. The first post office in present-day Meota was established in 1910, although it was initially called Beachview.

Joseph A. Dart, an early merchant, had previously established a store in a tent near current-day Meota, and in 1910, he moved to the Meota townsite where his store operated in a building on Main Street. The Canadian Northern Railway opened its line through Meota in 1910–1911. Meota incorporated as a village on July 6, 1911. In 1912 the first grain elevator was constructed, and then a dance pavilion opened in 1921. Other industries included brick manufacturing, a flour mill, and commercial fishing ("Meota Whites"). A series of fires has since decimated the village's business district, and the advent of the automobile caused many local residents to drive to North Battleford for shopping.

== Demographics ==
Population history (1981–2016)
Year	Pop.	±%
1981	235	—
1986	241	+2.6%
1991	268	+11.2%
1996	274	+2.2%
2001	293	+6.9%
2006	297	+1.4%
2011	307	+3.4%
2016	304	−1.0%
Source: Statistics Canada via Saskatchewan Bureau of Statistics

In the 2021 Census of Population conducted by Statistics Canada, Meota had a population of 325 living in 156 of its 213 total private dwellings, a change of 6.9% from its 2016 population of 304. With a land area of 1.61 km^{2} (0.62 sq mi), it had a population density of 201.9/km^{2} (522.8/sq mi) in 2021.

In the 2016 Census of Population, the Village of Meota recorded a population of 304 living in 148 of its 208 total private dwellings, a −1% change from its 2011 population of 307. With a land area of 1.55 km^{2} (0.60 sq mi), it had a population density of 196.1/km^{2} (508.0/sq mi) in 2016.

== Meota Regional Park ==
Meota Regional Park (53.0379°N 108.4507°W) is a regional park in the village of Meota on the shore of Jackfish Lake. The park has a campground, lake access with a sandy beach, boat launch, ball diamonds, swimming pool, and a tennis court. The 9-hole Meota & District Lakeside Golf Course is adjacent to the park. The campground has 100 campsites, washrooms, showers, and laundry.

== See also ==
- List of communities in Saskatchewan
- List of francophone communities in Saskatchewan
- List of villages in Saskatchewan
