= Lakeview, Saskatchewan =

Community in Saskatchewan, Canada

Coordinates: 53°02′19″N 108°25′12″W

Lakeview is a hamlet in the Canadian province of Saskatchewan. It is within the Rural Municipality of Meota No. 468 on the southern shore of Jackfish Lake.

== Demographics ==
In the 2021 Census of Population conducted by Statistics Canada, Lakeview had a population of 80 living in 40 of its 133 total private dwellings, a change of 90.5% from its 2016 population of 42. With a land area of 0.22 km^{2} (0.085 sq mi), it had a population density of 363.6/km^{2} (941.8/sq mi) in 2021.

== See also ==
- List of communities in Saskatchewan
