= Moosomin 112L =

Indian reserve in Saskatchewan, Canada

Coordinates: 53°01′09″N 107°20′33″W

- Indian reserve
- Moosomin Indian Reserve No. 112L
- Location in Saskatchewan
- First Nation: Moosomin
- Country: Canada
- Province: Saskatchewan

Area
  - Total: 2,069.2 ha (5,113 acres)

Moosomin 112L is an Indian reserve of the Moosomin First Nation in Saskatchewan. It is about 27 kilometres (17 mi) northwest of Blaine Lake.

== See also ==
- List of Indian reserves in Saskatchewan
