= Murray Lake (Saskatchewan) =

Lake in Saskatchewan, Canada

- Location in Saskatchewan Murray Lake (Canada)
- Location: Rural Municipality of Meota No. 468, Saskatchewan
- Coordinates: 53.0436°N 108.2996°W
- Part of: Saskatchewan River drainage basin
- Primary inflows: Lost Horse Creek; Crystal Creek
- Primary outflows: Lehman Creek
- Basin countries: Canada
- Max. length: 8.5 km (5.3 mi)
- Surface area: 1,183.4 ha (2,924 acres)
- Max. depth: 8.9 m (29 ft)
- Shore length^{1}: 22 km (14 mi)
- Surface elevation: 527 m (1,729 ft)
- Islands: Tucker Island
- Settlements: Cochin
- ^{1} Shore length is not a well-defined measure.

Murray Lake is a lake in the Canadian province of Saskatchewan about 30 kilometres (19 mi) north of North Battleford in the Rural Municipality of Meota No. 468. Murray Lake's outflow, Lehman Creek, connects it to the larger Jackfish Lake within the North Saskatchewan River drainage basin. Murray Lake Migratory Bird Sanctuary encompasses Murray Lake and some of the surrounding shoreline.

Several small communities dot the lake's shore with the resort village of Cochin being the largest. Highways 4 and 769 provide access to the lake and its amenities. Murray Lake's water levels are regulated by a control structure at Jackfish Lake's outflow.

== Description ==
Murray Lake is a deep lake with a steep shoreline. It is about 8.5 km (5.3 mi) long and covers an area of 1,183.4 ha (2,924 acres). At the southern end are the two main inflows — Crystal Creek and Lost Horse Creek — and the prominent Tucker Island. The outflow, Lehman Creek, is at the northern end. It is a short creek that flows west into Jackfish Lake through the resort village of Cochin. In "ancient times", when water levels were higher, Murray and Jackfish Lakes were joined as one lake. The hill south of Cochin was an island and, on the north-west side of Jackfish Lake, there are "three previous beach lines".

In 1932, a control structure was built at Jackfish Lake's outflow (the beginning of the Jackfish River). It was rebuilt in 1966 by the Jackfish Lake Watershed Association Board (JLWAB). This control structure, which is operated by JLWAB, regulates water levels in both lakes ensuring a maximum water level of 529.44 metres (1,737.0 ft).

=== Flora ===
Murray Lake is in the boreal parkland ecoregion of Saskatchewan. The shore's vegetation consists mostly of sedges, grasses, bulrush, and cattail, while water milfoil, hornwort, water crowfoot, bladderwort, and pondweed beds make up most of the aquatic vegetation.

== Communities ==
There are several communities that line Murray Lake's shore. At the northern end of the lake is the resort village of Cochin. Cochin straddles the isthmus that separarates Jackfish and Murray Lakes. Murray Lake's outflow, Lehman Creek, runs through the community. Just to the north of Cochin is the Cochin Lighthouse. It overlooks the community and both lakes and is Saskatchewan's only lighthouse.

Along Murray Lake's western shore are the communities of Maymont Beach, Sleepy Hollow, Pelican Point, and Summerfield Beach. Lanz Point is along the southern shore, near the inflow of Crystal Creek. The Indian reserves of Moosomin 112B and Saulteaux 159 border the north-eastern corner of the lake.

== Murray Lake MBS ==
Murray Lake Migratory Bird Sanctuary was established on 3 November 1948. It was one of five new migratorty bird sanctuaries (MBS) created in Canada that year. They replaced five other sanctuaries that lost status due to drought conditions. Murray Lake MBS covers an area of 1,165 ha (2,880 acres) and encompasses the lake, its shoreline, Tucker Island, and the deltas of Crystal and Lost Horse Creek. It "consists of 60% open water, 36% sedge meadow/marsh, and 4% island". The sanctuary "preserves quality habitat for many ducks to rest and feed".

Besides ducks, there are several other water and shore birds that inhabit Murray Lake at various points of the year. Some of the birds that breed at the lake include common snipes, Wilson's phalaropes, killdeers, western and pied-billed grebes, soras, Foster's and black terns, and Franklin's gulls. Birds that use the lake, but are not known to breed there, include white pelicans, ring-billed gulls, common terns, and American avocets.

== Fish species ==
Fish commonly found in Murray Lake include northern pike, walleye, and yellow perch.

== See also ==
- List of lakes of Saskatchewan
- List of protected areas of Saskatchewan
- List of Migratory Bird Sanctuaries of Canada
