= Martinson's Beach =

Community in Saskatchewan, Canada

Coordinates: 53°05′59″N 108°25′59″W

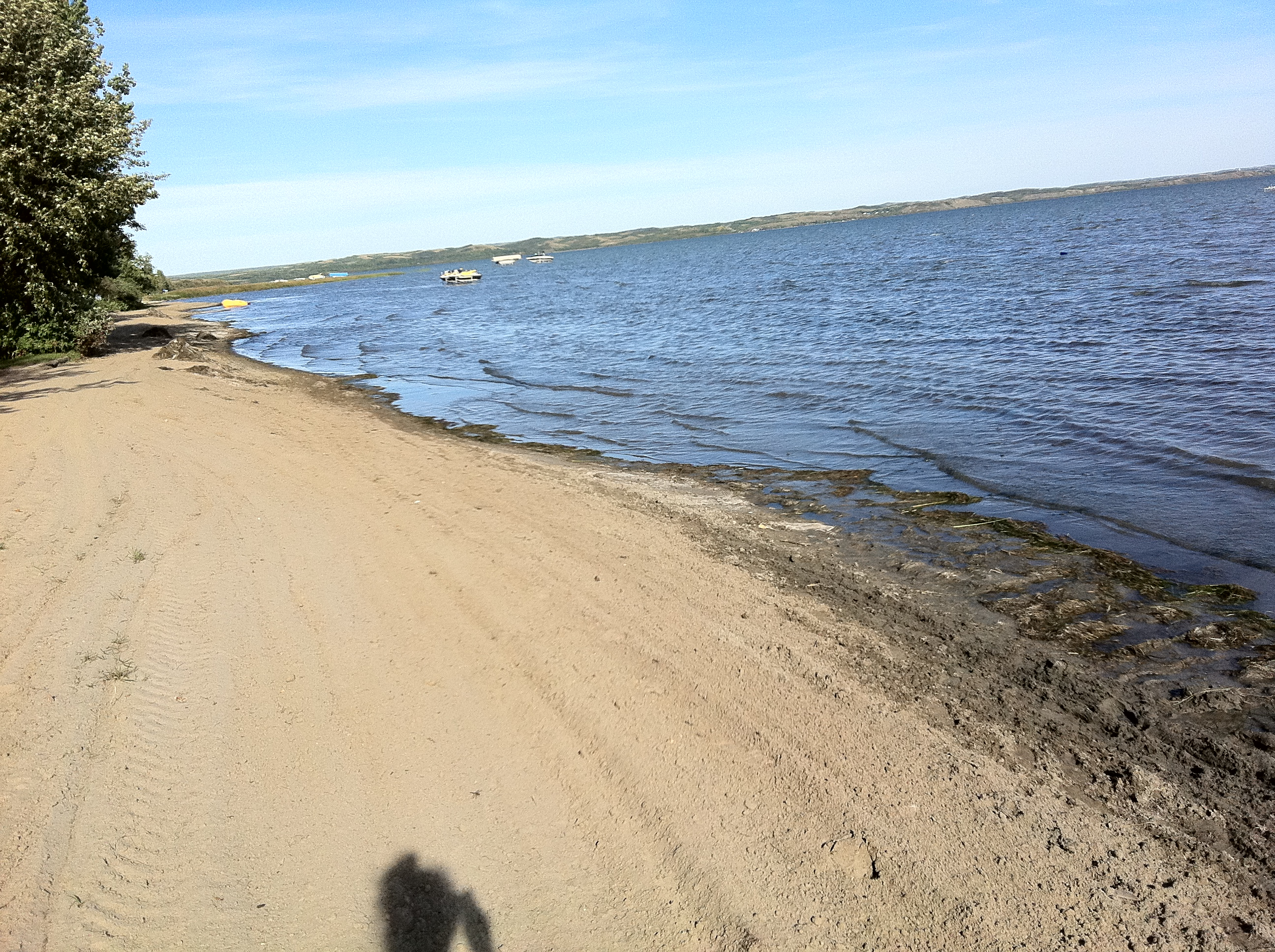
Beach along Jackfish Lake at Martinson's Beach

Martinson's Beach is a hamlet in the Canadian province of Saskatchewan. It is on the western shore of Jackfish Lake in the Rural Municipality of Meota No. 468.

== Demographics ==
In the 2021 Census of Population conducted by Statistics Canada, Martinson's Beach had a population of 49 living in 22 of its 65 total private dwellings, a change of -2% from its 2016 population of 50. With a land area of 0.12 km^{2} (0.046 sq mi), it had a population density of 408.3/km^{2} (1,057.6/sq mi) in 2021.

== See also ==
- List of communities in Saskatchewan
