= Moosomin 112B =

Indian reserve in Saskatchewan, Canada

Coordinates: 53°06′56″N 108°14′20″W

- Indian reserve
- Moosomin Indian Reserve No. 112B
- Location in Saskatchewan
- First Nation: Moosomin
- Country: Canada
- Province: Saskatchewan

Area
  - Total: 6,933.8 ha (17,134 acres)

Population (2016)
  - Total: 724
  - Density: 10.4/km^{2} (27.0/sq mi)
- Community Well-Being Index: 48

Moosomin 112B is an Indian reserve of the Moosomin First Nation in Saskatchewan. It is about 32 kilometres (20 mi) north of North Battleford. The south-west corner of the reserve is along the north-eastern shore of Murray Lake.

In the 2016 Canadian Census, the reserve recorded a population of 724 living in 183 of its 195 total private dwellings. In the same year, its Community Well-Being index was calculated at 48 of 100, compared to 58.4 for the average First Nations community and 77.5 for the average non-Indigenous community.

== See also ==
- List of Indian reserves in Saskatchewan
