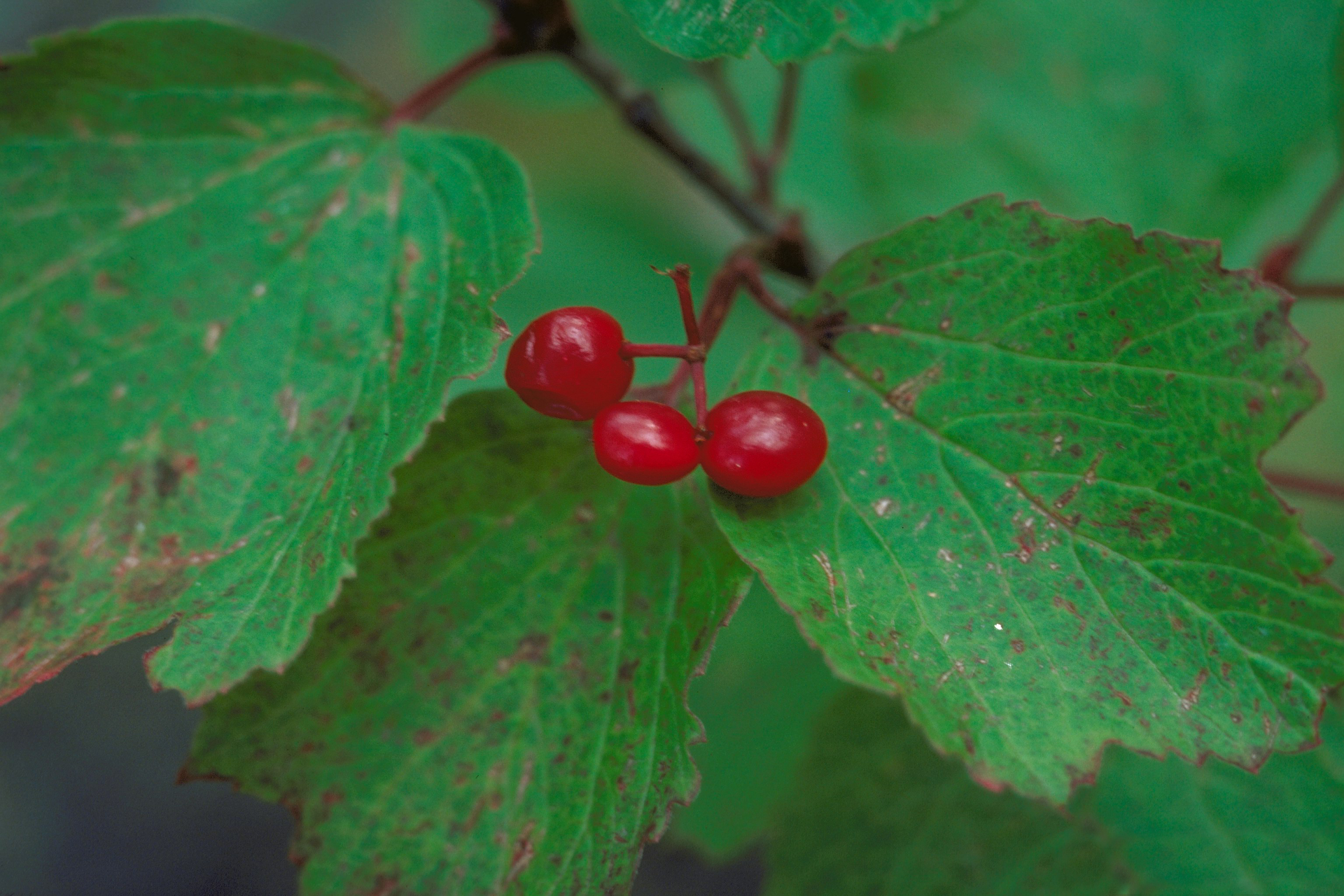

Scientific classification
- Kingdom: Plantae
- Clade: Tracheophytes
- Clade: Angiosperms
- Clade: Eudicots
- Clade: Asterids
- Order: Dipsacales
- Family: Adoxaceae
- Genus: Viburnum
- Species: V. edule

Binomial name
- Viburnum edule (Michx.) Raf.

= Viburnum edule =

Squashberry

Species of flowering plant

Viburnum edule, the squashberry, mooseberry, moosomin, moosewood viburnum, pembina, pimina, highbush cranberry, or lowbush cranberry is a species of shrub. It grows up to 2.5 metres (8 ft) tall and has smooth branches.

The species is native to Canada and the northern United States. The tart berries ripen early in spring and are eaten by various animals. With the seeds removed, they are edible to humans as well, and can be made into jam.

== Description ==
It is a deciduous, dicot shrub growing 0.5–2.5 metres (1 1/2–8 ft) tall. The bark is smooth and reddish-grey in colour, the twigs glabrous.

The leaves are opposite, elliptic in shape, 6–10 centimetres (2 1/4–4 in) long, unlobed or shallowly 3-lobed, jaggedly serrated, and turning red in autumn; their underside glabrous, especially along the veins.

The flowers are arranged in a small, compact, and flat or rounded inflorescence 1–3 cm (1/2–1 1/4 in) across consisting of several flowers. The flowers are synoecious and fertile, the petals white and fused at the base forming a tube that flares into 5 lobes at the top; the stamens short (≤ 1mm) and hidden within the corolla.

Ripening early in spring, the fruit is an edible red or orange berry-like drupe, 0.8–1.5 cm (1/4–1/2 in) long, arranged in clusters, each fruit containing a single, flattened stone.

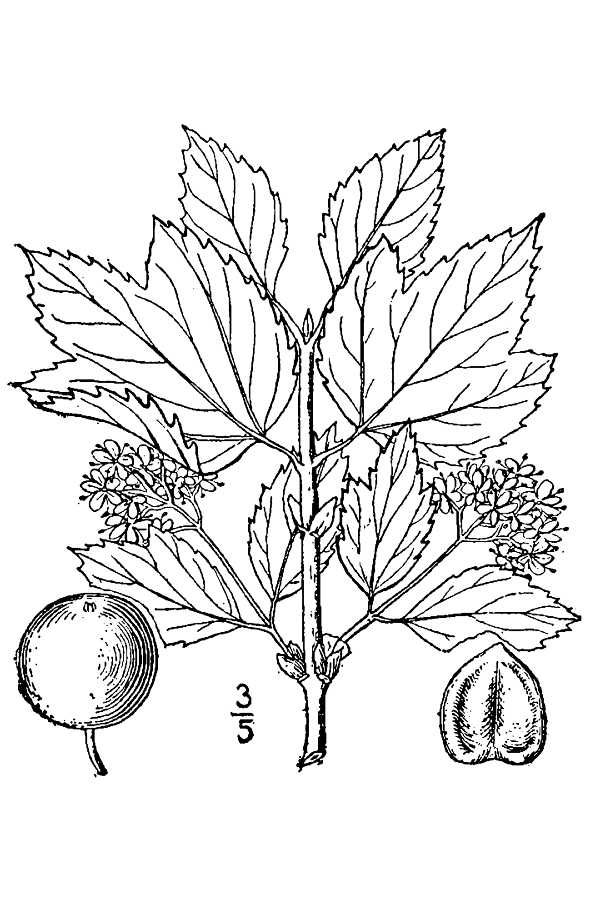
Illustration

== Taxonomy ==
French botanist André Michaux is the first recorded authority to provide a scientific name for the plant, calling it Viburnum opulus var. Pimina or Viburnum trilobum var. edule in 1803. The name edule is derived from the latin word ĕdūlis, meaning edible. The name Pimina refers to the common name for the plant used in Canada at the time. French naturalist Constantine Samuel Rafinesque observed the plant later in 1808, calling it Viburnum edule, V. opulus var. of Michaux. A lack of communication and consensus between naming authorities resulted in further names being provided for the same plant, the most popular being Viburnum pauciflorum. The discrepancy was eventually resolved, and the name Viburnum edule became the commonly accepted scientific name that is still in use today.

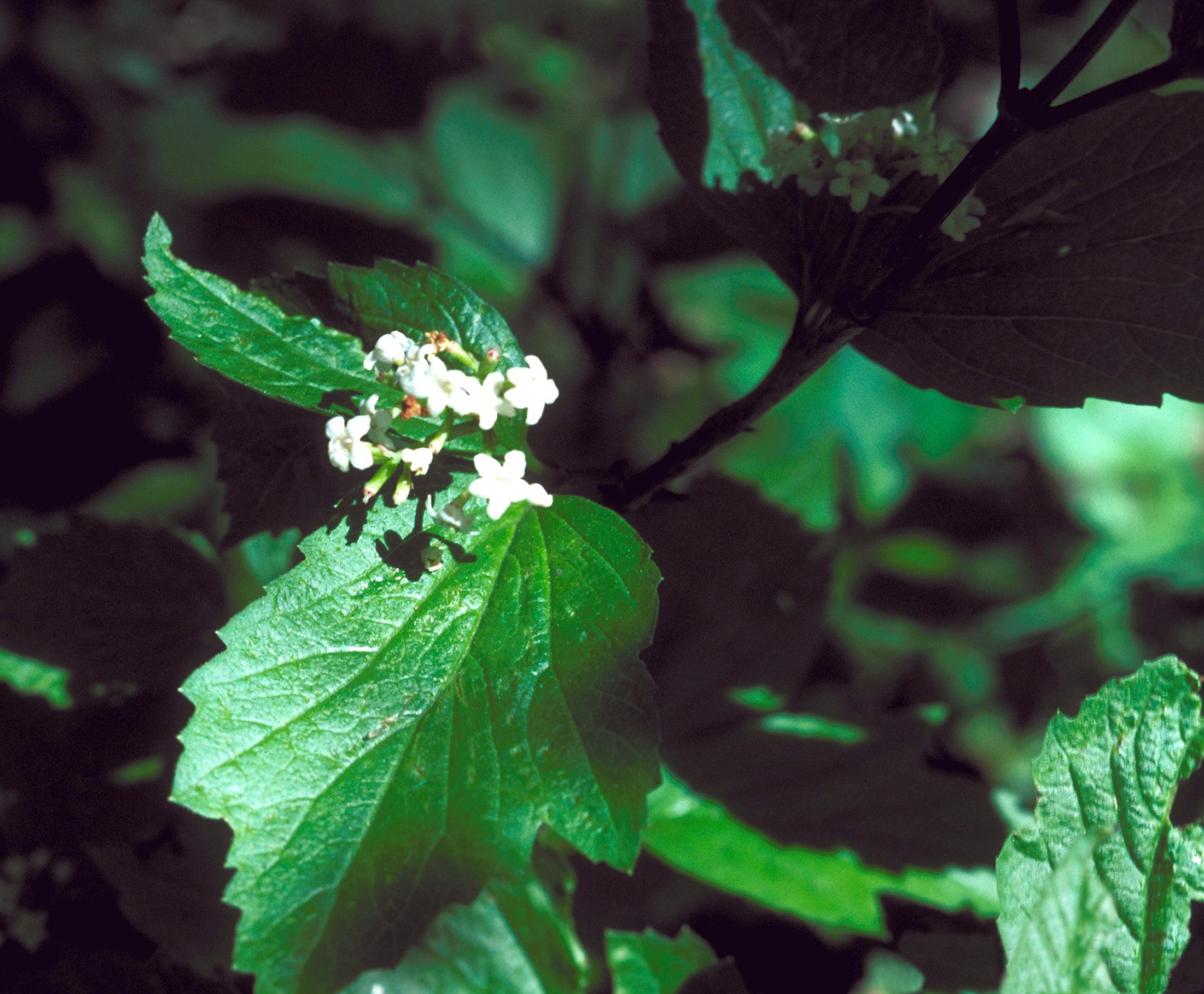
Flowers

Viburnum edule was originally categorized as a member of the Caprifoliaceae (honeysuckle) family; however, phylogenetic analysis has caused the plant to be re-classified as a member of the Adoxaceae (moschatel) family.

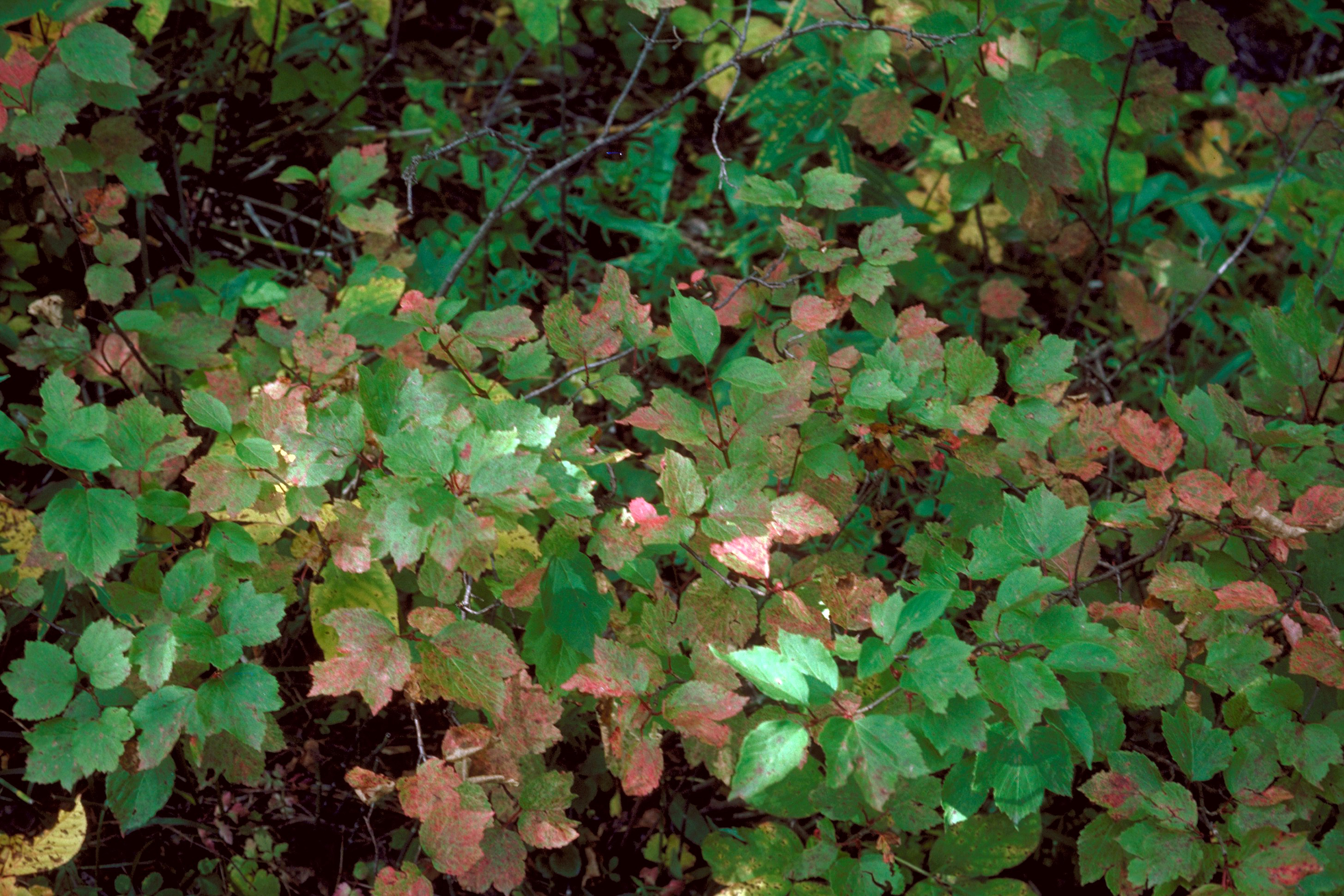
Foliage

== Distribution and habitat ==
Squashberry is distributed across Canada, all throughout Alaska, and in northern states of the US Specifically, it can abundantly be found in the following regions: the Yukon, northern Quebec, western District of Mackenzie to James Bay, south Newfoundland to Oregon, Idaho, Colorado, Minnesota and Pennsylvania. It will be found either as a dominant or codominant understory plant of coniferous forests. Oftentimes, squashberry grows abundantly in Picea glauca (white spruce) forests. Squashberry is also known to be an important pioneer species that grows early after forest fires.

Squashberry can be found growing in moist soils of various forested regions. It is also found growing in dense areas of trees and shrubs, alongside wetlands and bodies of water, and at higher elevations on gravel banks. The ideal type of soil is moist alluvial soil with good drainage. This plant is dispersed through animals, such as birds and mammals, that carry, eat, digest, and excrete the seeds in different areas.

== Ecology ==
Many birds and mammals consume the wild berries, while smaller animals can use the plant as shelter.

== Uses ==
With the seeds removed, the fruit is commonly consumed fresh and can be used to prepare foods such as jams and jellies.

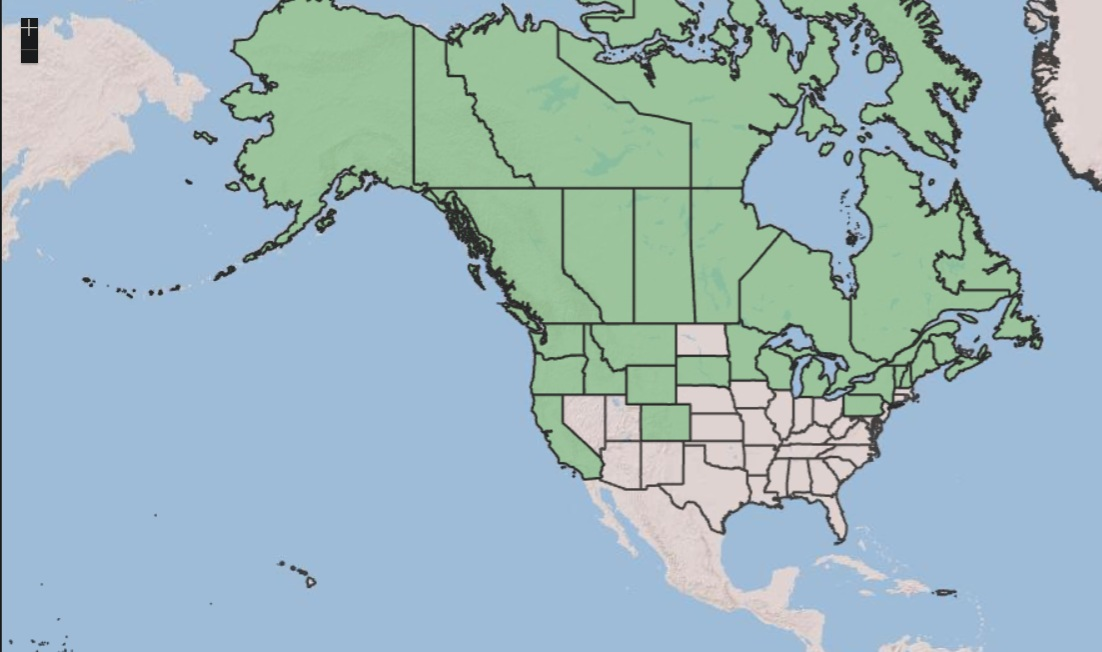
The range of Viburnum edule in North America

Multiple parts of the plant have been used in herbal medicine. The berries can be used to prepare herbal cough medicines, while the roots have been used to make tea for relief of tooth pain or a sore throat. The twigs of the plant can be chewed or gargled as a tea to treat sore throat. Lip sores have been treated by massaging the closed flower buds of V. edule on the lips. Modern research efforts have found that the fruit contains high levels of antioxidants.

Numerous Indigenous peoples have traditionally used the plant. The Nuxalk people from the Bella Coola region of British Columbia utilize the berries for food due to the plant's rapid growth rate and high berry production. A single Viburnum edule shrub can produce a yield of up to 100 berries. Multiple First Nations groups on the northwestern coast of North America have cultivated V. edule plants, planting them in wild forest gardens. Consumption of the berries was mentioned in multiple origin myths of the Haida people, often depicted as the food eaten at feasts or consumed by supernatural beings. Inuit peoples near the Nain settlement in Newfoundland and Labrador are also known to traditionally collect the wild fruits.
