= Jackfish Lake (Saskatchewan) =

Lake in Saskatchewan, Canada

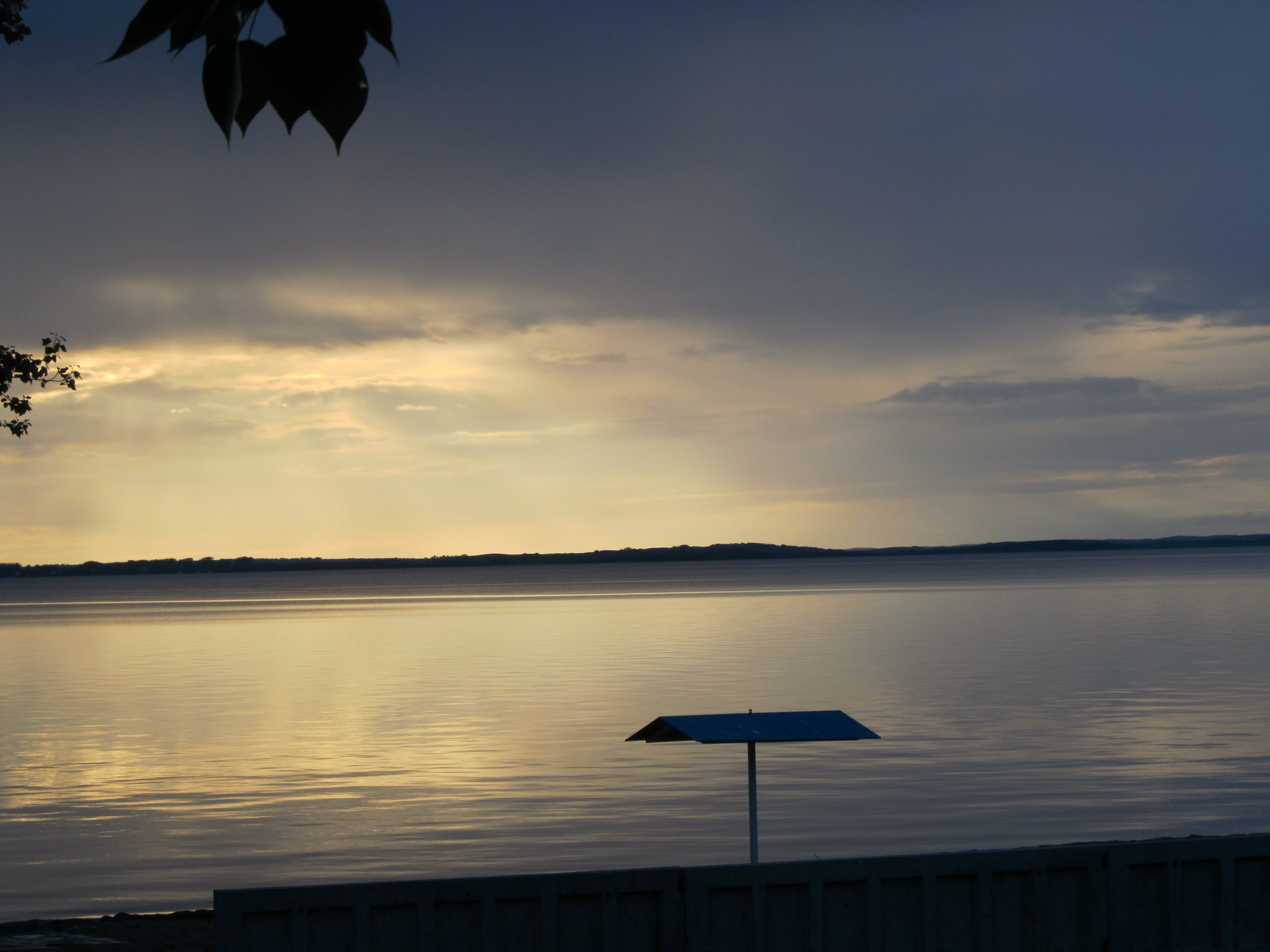
- Dusk at Jackfish Lake

- Location in Saskatchewan Jackfish Lake (Canada)
- Location: RM of Meota No. 468, Saskatchewan
- Coordinates: 53.0667°N 108.4007°W
- Part of: Saskatchewan River drainage basin
- Primary inflows: Jackfish Creek; Lehman Creek
- Primary outflows: Jackfish River
- Catchment area: 3,320 km^{2} (1,280 sq mi)
- Basin countries: Canada
- Max. length: 14.8 km (9.2 mi)
- Max. width: 9 km (5.6 mi)
- Surface area: 7,212.6 ha (17,823 acres)
- Average depth: 2.4 m (7 ft 10 in)
- Max. depth: 7.1 m (23 ft)
- Shore length^{1}: 42 km (26 mi)
- Surface elevation: 528 m (1,732 ft)
- Settlements: Meota; Metinota; Cochin; Aquadeo
- ^{1} Shore length is not a well-defined measure.

Jackfish Lake is a large, shallow lake in central Saskatchewan, Canada. It is about 48 kilometres (30 mi) southeast of the village of Edam in the Rural Municipality of Meota No. 468. There are several communities and two parks along the lake's shores. Access to the lake and its amenities is from Highways 4, 26, 697, 674, 769, and 204.

Jackfish River, located at the lake's southern end, is the primary outflow. The river exits at the south end of the lake through a control structure that was built in 1966 that regulates Jackfish Lake's levels. From the control structure, the river flows south into the North Saskatchewan River about 16 kilometres (9.9 mi) upstream, to the northwest, from The Battlefords. Charette Creek, Jackfish Creek, and Lehman Creek from Murray Lake at Cochin are its main inflows.

== Description ==
Jackfish Lake is in the boreal parkland ecoregion of east-central Saskatchewan. It is a large, shallow lake that covers an area of 7,212.6 hectares (17,823 acres) and has an average depth of 2.4 metres (7 ft 10 in). It is about 14.8 kilometres (9.2 mi) long and 9 kilometres (5.6 mi) wide. The drainage basin of the lake is 3,320 square kilometres (1,280 sq mi).

In "ancient times", when water levels were higher, Murray and Jackfish Lakes were joined as one lake. The hill south of Cochin was an island and, on the north-west side of Jackfish Lake, there are "three previous beach lines".

In 1966, the Jackfish River control structure was built by the Jackfish Lake Watershed Association Board (JLWAB) at the lake's outflow to regulate water levels and ensure a stable water supply for downstream water users. The control structure ensures a maximum water level of 529.44 metres (1,737.0 ft).

== Communities ==
There are several small communities around the lake. Along the southern shore is the village of Meota, the resort village of Metinota, and the hamlet of Lakeview. Along the eastern shore is the resort village of Cochin and the hamlets of Trevessa Beach, Day's Beach, West Chatfield Beach, and Bayview Heights. Also along the eastern shore is a small part of Saulteaux 159 Indian reserve. Cochin straddles the isthmus that separarates Jackfish and Murray Lakes with Murray Lake's outflow, Lehman Creek, running through the community. Just to the north of Cochin is the Cochin Lighthouse. It overlooks the community and both lakes and is Saskatchewan's only lighthouse.

The resort village of Aquadeo is the only community on the northern shore and the hamlet of Martinson's Beach is the only one on the western side.

== Parks and recreation ==
There are two parks at Jackfish Lake. The Battlefords Provincial Park is along the north-eastern shore and Meota Regional Park is along the southern.

The Battlefords Provincial Park has several beaches, three campgrounds with over 300 campsites, several hiking trails, and a golf course. Meota Regional Park is in the village of Meota. It has a beach, swimming pool, ball diamonds, over 100 campsites, mini-golf, and nature trails. A golf course is located adjacent to the park.

== Fish species ==
Fish commonly found in Jackfish Lake include perch, walleye, northern pike, burbot, channel catfish, and whitefish.

== Gallery ==
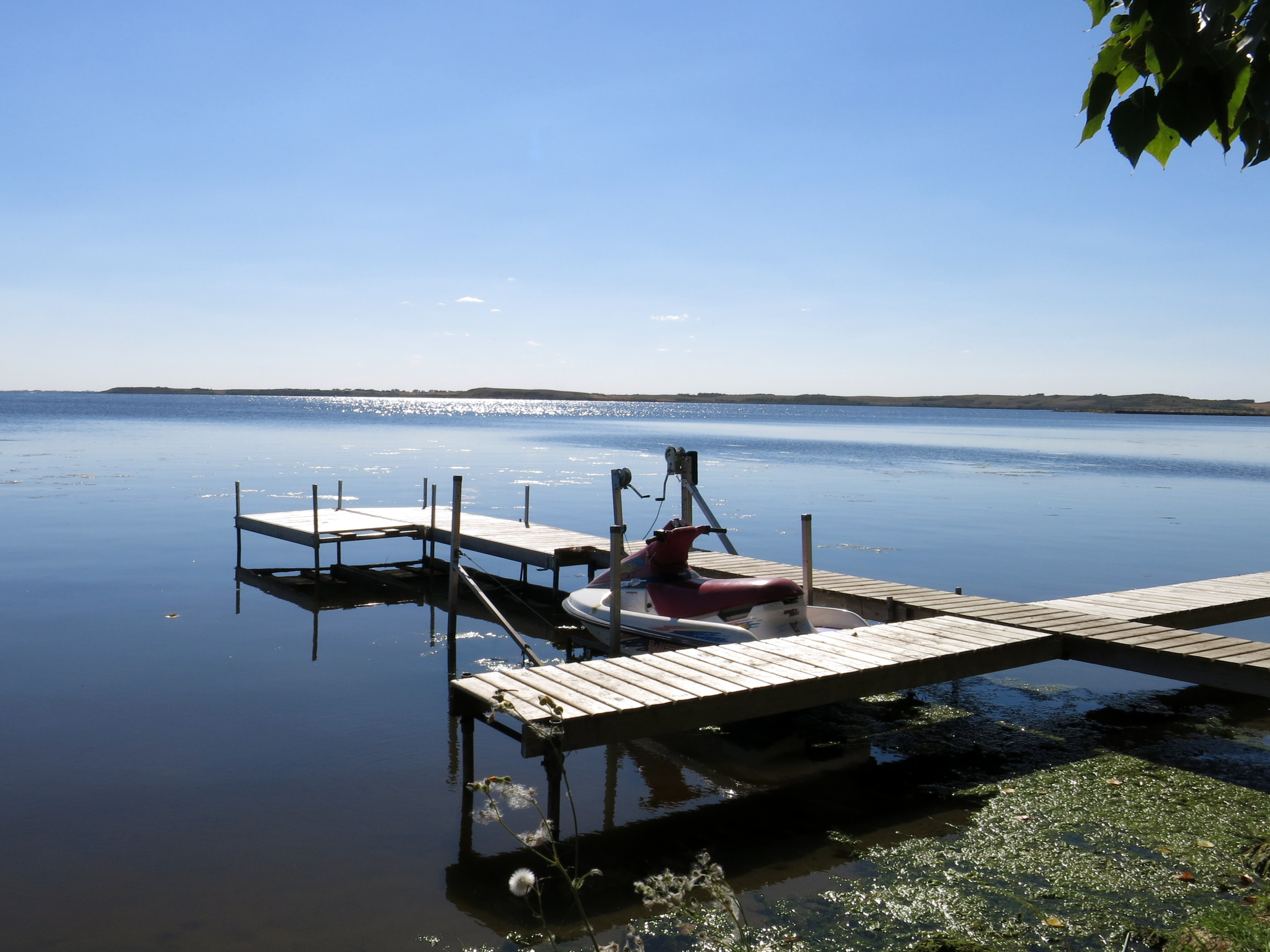
Pier at Jackfish Lake

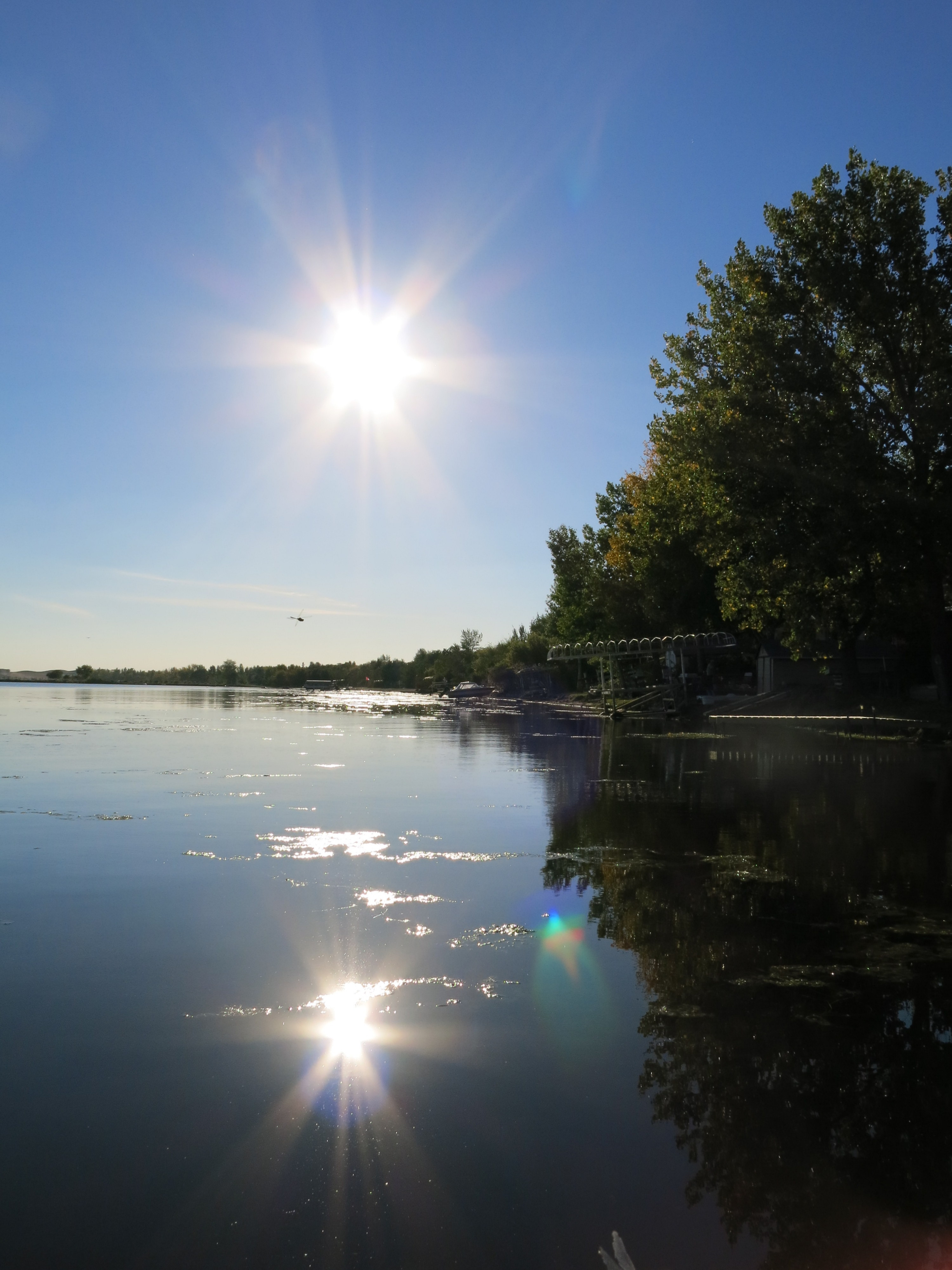

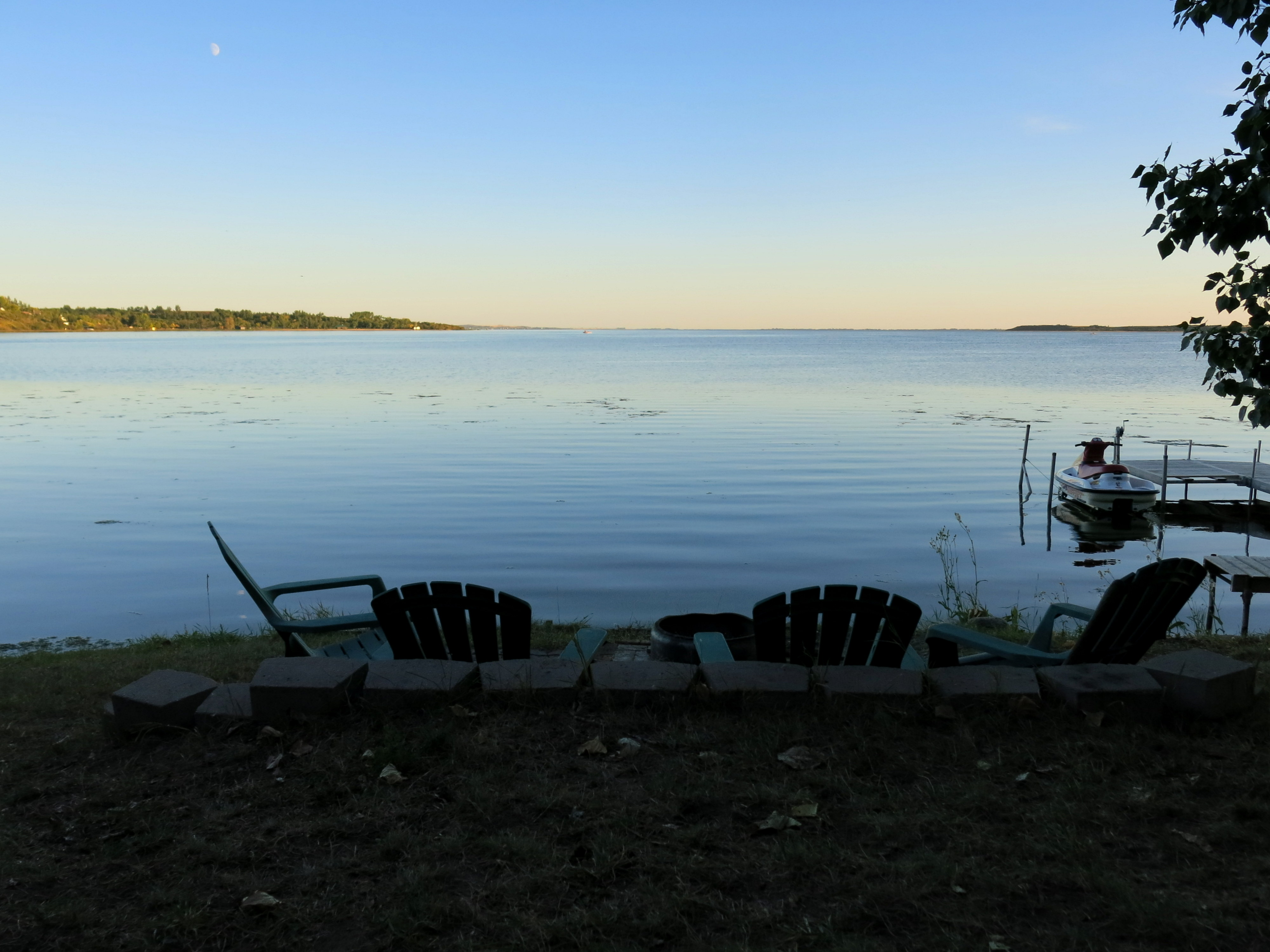

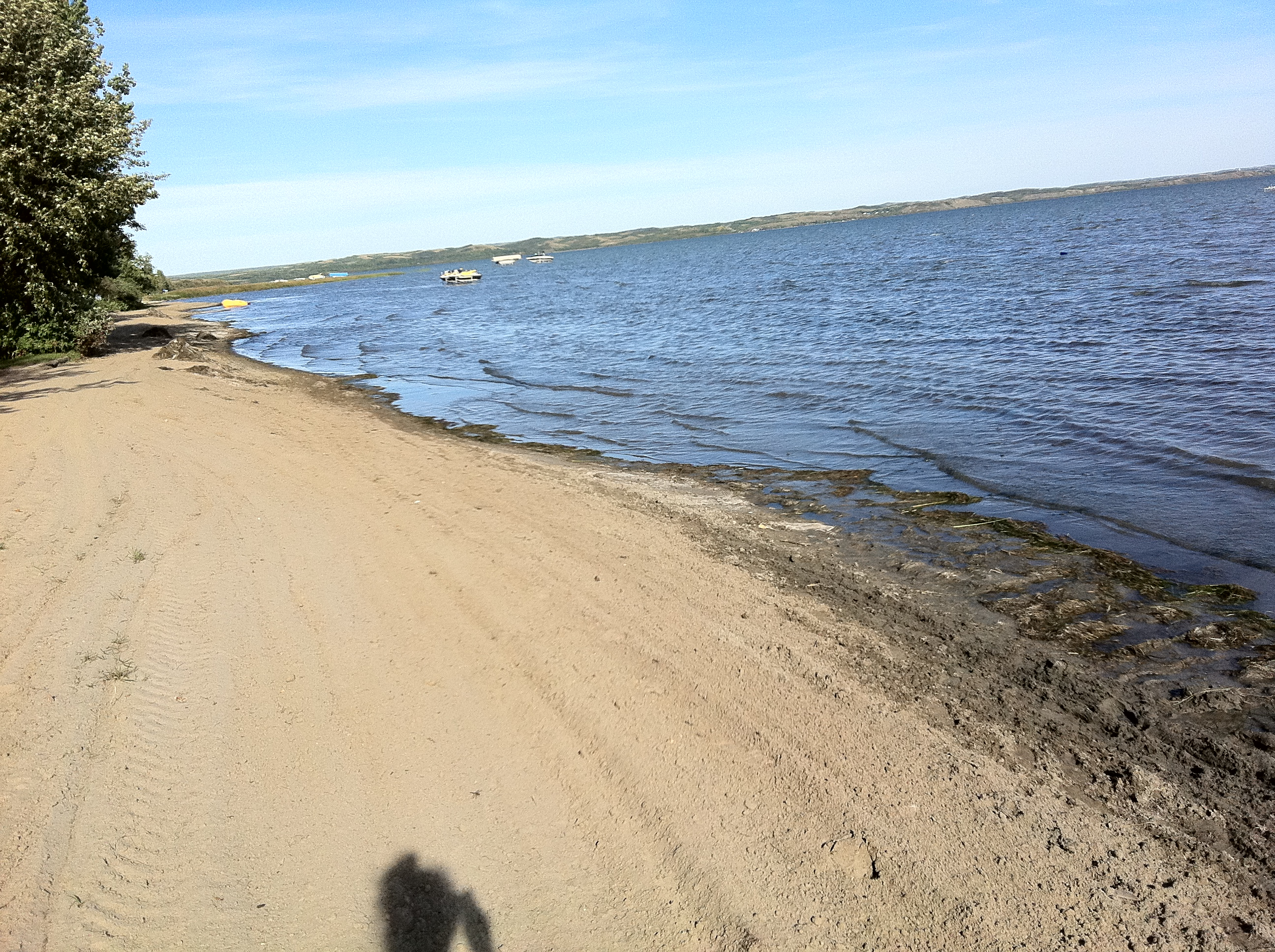
View of Jackfish Lake from Martinson's Beach.

== See also ==
- List of lakes of Saskatchewan
