= Saulteaux 159 =

Indian reserve in Saskatchewan, Canada

Coordinates: 53°08′37″N 108°19′07″W

- Indian reserve
- Saulteaux Indian Reserve No. 159
- Location in Saskatchewan
- First Nation: Saulteaux
- Country: Canada
- Province: Saskatchewan

Area
  - Total: 3,925.3 ha (9,700 acres)

Population (2016)
  - Total: 473
  - Density: 12.1/km^{2} (31.2/sq mi)
- Community Well-Being Index: 50

Saulteaux 159 is an Indian reserve of the Saulteaux First Nation in Saskatchewan, Canada. It is on the shores of both Jackfish and Murray Lakes, about 43 kilometres (27 mi) north of North Battleford.

In the 2016 Canadian Census, the reserve recorded a population of 473 living in 133 of its 142 total private dwellings. In the same year, its Community Well-Being index was calculated at 50 of 100, compared to 58.4 for the average First Nations community and 77.5 for the average non-Indigenous community.

== See also ==
- List of Indian reserves in Saskatchewan
