= Cochin Bridge (Palakkad, India) =

Bridge in Kerala, India

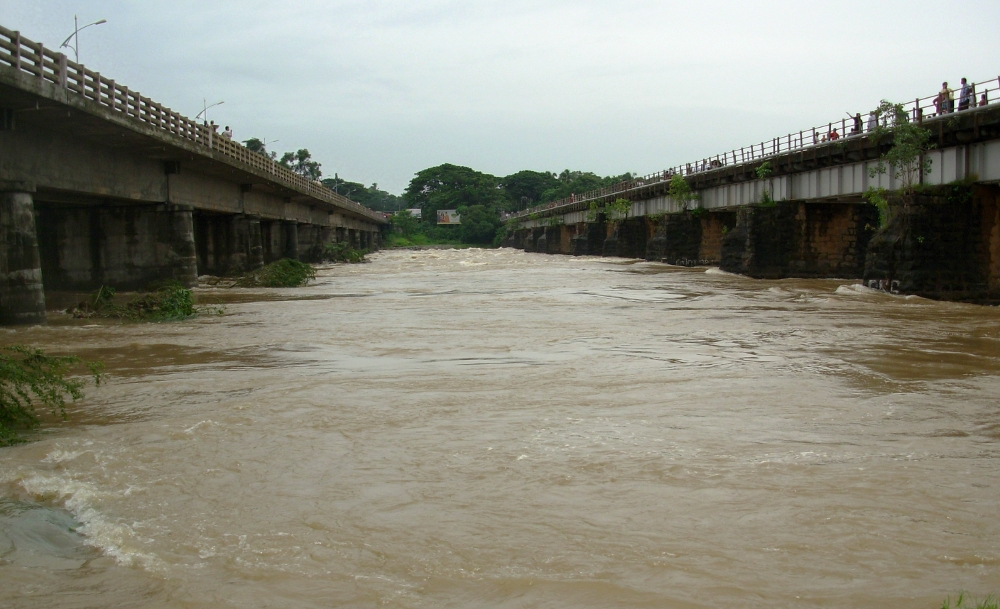
- Old Cochin Bridge and new Cochin Bridge in 2007
- Coordinates: 10°45′12″N 76°16′32″E
- Carried: Rail (former); Road
- Crossed: Bharathappuzha
- Locale: Shoranur, Palakkad district, Kerala
- Official name: Kochi Bridge
- Maintained by: Archeology Department, Kerala

Characteristics
- Design: Indo- British
- Material: Steel & Rail
- Total length: 32 m(Previously 322 Meter)
- Width: 180 Meter
- Height: 85 Cm
- Longest span: 14
- No. of spans: 15
- Load limit: 5000 Kg
- Clearance above: Yes
- Clearance below: -

History
- Designer: British Government
- Construction start: 1901
- Construction end: 1902
- Opened: 2 June 1902
- Collapsed: 2009 ( First time), 2011( Second time), 2021( Third time), 2024( Last time)
- Closed: 1989

Statistics
- Daily traffic: Traffic only on Road Bridge
- Toll: No

Location
- Interactive map of Cochin Bridge

The Cochin Bridge is a collapsed historical bridge located in Palakkad district, Kerala, India. It was originally constructed as a rail bridge, that lies across the Bharathapuzha river, connecting Shoranur in Palakkad district with Cheruthuruthy in Thrissur district. The bridge's construction was completed in 1902 at the cost of 84 lakh rupees by Shri Rama Varma Thampuran, the Maharaja of Kochi, who reigned from the year 1895 till 1914. This was the only bridge built in that time to make Malabar navigable to the Kingdom of Kochi. The first freight train passed over the bridge on 2 June 1902 and a few days later on the 16 June, the first passenger train made the journey from Shoranur to Kochi through the bridge. Due to damage, it was closed in 1989, and a new bridge was built parallel to it. As of October 2023, the bridge is in a collapsed condition and the authorities are planning to completely dismantle it.

== History ==
Rama Varma Thampuran, who ruled the Kingdom of Cochin from 1895 to 1914, constructed the bridge. The railway line that came up to Shoranur was intended to be extended all the way to Cochin by the King, who was praised as a progressive leader. Two arterial train routes intersected in Shoranur, making it a significant location on the rail map. The Ernakulam-Shoranur railway line was constructed on the King's initiative, and the first train ran on it in June 1902. According to railway historian Devan Varma, to fund the railway project, the King sold some of the royal family's prized possessions, including the elephant's nettipattam (caparisons).

Bullock carts were allowed to traverse the bridge in its early days even though it was initially a narrow gauge rail bridge. It was converted to a broad gauge bridge in 1935. When the British built a brand-new rail bridge next to it, the old one was converted to a road bridge in 1945. The Kerala government built a new Cochin Bridge in 2003 to replace the old one. In 2009, a pillar of the bridge collapsed and in November 2011, the eighth and ninth spans of the bridge collapsed when the ninth pillar gave in.

== See also ==
- List of bridges in India
