= Bayview Heights, Saskatchewan =

Community in Saskatchewan, Canada

Coordinates: 53°08′01″N 108°23′53″W

Bayview Heights is a hamlet in the Canadian province of Saskatchewan. It is within the Rural Municipality of Meota No. 468.

== Geography ==
It is located in The Battlefords Provincial Park on the eastern shore of Jackfish Lake.

== Demographics ==
In the 2021 Census of Population conducted by Statistics Canada, Bayview Heights had a population of 10 living in 2 of its 21 total private dwellings, a change of -33.3% from its 2016 population of 15. With a land area of 0.05 km^{2} (0.019 sq mi), it had a population density of 200.0/km^{2} (518.0/sq mi) in 2021.

== See also ==
- List of communities in Saskatchewan
