= Aquadeo =

Resort village in Saskatchewan, Canada

- Resort village
- Resort Village of Aquadeo
- Location within Saskatchewan Location within Canada
- Coordinates: 53.137°N 108.425°W
- Country: Canada
- Province: Saskatchewan
- Census division: 17
- Rural municipality: RM of Meota No. 468
- Incorporated: January 1, 1988

Government
  - Mayor: Peter Delainey
  - Governing body: Resort Village Council
  - Administrator: Brian de Montbrun

Area (2016)
  - Land: 0.74 km^{2} (0.29 sq mi)

Population (2016)
  - Total: 111
  - Density: 150/km^{2} (390/sq mi)
- Time zone: CST
  - Summer (DST): CST
- Postal code: S0M 0L0
- Area codes: 306 and 639
- Highway(s): Highway 769
- Waterway(s): Jackfish Lake
- Website: Official website

Aquadeo (2016 population: 111) is a resort village in the Canadian province of Saskatchewan within Census Division No. 17. It is on the northern shore of Jackfish Lake in the Rural Municipality of Meota No. 468. It is approximately 40 kilometres (25 mi) north of North Battleford.

== History ==
Aquadeo incorporated as a resort village on January 1, 1988. The name is a portmanteau of "aquatic" and "rodeo".

== Demographics ==
Population history (1981–2016)
Year	Pop.	±%
1981		—
1986		—
1991	43	—
1996	53	+23.3%
2001	62	+17.0%
2006	123	+98.4%
2011	84	−31.7%
2016	111	+32.1%
Source: Statistics Canada via Saskatchewan Bureau of Statistics

In the 2021 Census of Population conducted by Statistics Canada, Aquadeo had a population of 203 living in 101 of its 450 total private dwellings, a change of 82.9% from its 2016 population of 111. With a land area of 0.7 km^{2} (0.27 sq mi), it had a population density of 290.0/km^{2} (751.1/sq mi) in 2021.

In the 2016 Census of Population conducted by Statistics Canada, the Resort Village of Aquadeo recorded a population of 111 living in 58 of its 387 total private dwellings, a 32.1% change from its 2011 population of 84. With a land area of 0.74 km^{2} (0.29 sq mi), it had a population density of 150.0/km^{2} (388.5/sq mi) in 2016.

== Government ==
The Resort Village of Aquadeo is governed by an elected municipal council and an appointed administrator that meets on the third Wednesday of every month. The mayor is Peter Delainey and its administrator is Brian de Montbrun.

== See also ==
- List of communities in Saskatchewan
- List of resort villages in Saskatchewan
- List of summer villages in Alberta
