= Metinota =

Resort village in Saskatchewan, Canada

- Resort village
- Resort Village of Metinota
- Location within Saskatchewan Location within Canada
- Coordinates: 53.035°N 108.416°W
- Country: Canada
- Province: Saskatchewan
- Census division: 17
- Rural municipality: RM of Meota No. 468
- Incorporated: August 19, 1924

Government
  - Mayor: Tim Lafreniere
  - Governing body: Resort Village Council
  - Administrator: Carmen Menssa

Area (2016)
  - Land: 0.52 km^{2} (0.20 sq mi)

Population (2016)
  - Total: 80
  - Density: 153.8/km^{2} (398/sq mi)
- Time zone: CST
  - Summer (DST): CST
- Area codes: 306 and 639
- Waterway(s): Jackfish Lake

Metinota (2016 population: 80) is a resort village in the Canadian province of Saskatchewan within Census Division No. 17. It is on the shores of Jackfish Lake in the Rural Municipality of Meota No. 468. It is approximately 154 kilometres (96 mi) northwest of Saskatoon.

== History ==
Metinota incorporated as a resort village on August 19, 1924 under the name of Village of Metinota. The name means “It’s really nice here” to the Cree Nation. Its name was officially changed to the Resort Village of Metinota on August 9, 2019 to match its municipal status.

== Demographics ==
Population history (1981–2016)
Year	Pop.	±%
1981	19	—
1986	9	−52.6%
1991	18	+100.0%
1996	32	+77.8%
2001	69	+115.6%
2006	89	+29.0%
2011	89	+0.0%
2016	80	−10.1%
Source: Statistics Canada via Saskatchewan Bureau of Statistics

In the 2021 Census of Population conducted by Statistics Canada, Metinota had a population of 86 living in 44 of its 97 total private dwellings, a change of 7.5% from its 2016 population of 80. With a land area of 0.46 km^{2} (0.18 sq mi), it had a population density of 187.0/km^{2} (484.2/sq mi) in 2021.

In the 2016 Census of Population conducted by Statistics Canada, the Resort Village of Metinota recorded a population of 80 living in 37 of its 57 total private dwellings, a −10.1% change from its 2011 population of 89. With a land area of 0.52 km^{2} (0.20 sq mi), it had a population density of 153.8/km^{2} (398.5/sq mi) in 2016.

== Government ==
The Resort Village of Metinota is governed by an elected municipal council and an appointed administrator. The mayor is Tim Lafreniere and its administrator is Carmen Menssa.

== See also ==
- List of communities in Saskatchewan
- List of resort villages in Saskatchewan
- List of summer villages in Alberta
