= Rural Municipality of Meota No. 468 =

Rural municipality in Saskatchewan, Canada

Meota No. 468
- Rural municipality
- Rural Municipality of Meota No. 468

- Location of the RM of Meota No. 468 in Saskatchewan
- Coordinates: 53.104°N 108.359°W
- Country: Canada
- Province: Saskatchewan
- Census division: 17
- SARM division: 6
- Formed: December 13, 1909

Government
  - Reeve: Sherry Jimmy
  - Governing body: RM of Meota No. 468 Council
  - Administrator: Kirk Morrison
  - Office location: Meota

Area (2016)
  - Land: 651.06 km^{2} (251.38 sq mi)

Population (2016)
  - Total: 933
  - Density: 1.4/km^{2} (3.6/sq mi)
- Time zone: CST
  - Summer (DST): CST
- Area codes: 306 and 639

The Rural Municipality of Meota No. 468 (2016 population: 933) is a rural municipality (RM) in the Canadian province of Saskatchewan within Census Division No. 17 and SARM Division No. 6.

== History ==
The RM of Meota No. 468 incorporated as a rural municipality on December 13, 1909.

== Geography ==
=== Communities and localities ===
The following urban municipalities are surrounded by the RM.

Villages

- Meota

Resort villages

- Aquadeo
- Cochin
- Metinota

The following unincorporated communities are within the RM.

Organized hamlets

- Bayview Heights
- Day's Beach
- Lakeview
- Lanz Point
- Martinson's Beach
- Maymont Beach
- Prince
- Pelican Point
- Sleepy Hollow
- Summerfield Beach
- Trevessa Beach
- West Chatfield Beach

Localities

- Jackfish Lake

== Demographics ==
Population history (1981–2016)
Year	Pop.	±%
1981	1,106	—
1986	1,084	−2.0%
1991	799	−26.3%
1996	800	+0.1%
2001	885	+10.6%
2006	984	+11.2%
2011	936	−4.9%
2016	933	−0.3%
Source: Statistics Canada via Saskatchewan Bureau of Statistics

In the 2021 Census of Population conducted by Statistics Canada, the RM of Meota No. 468 had a population of 1,110 living in 465 of its 930 total private dwellings, a change of 19% from its 2016 population of 933. With a land area of 642.11 km^{2} (247.92 sq mi), it had a population density of 1.7/km^{2} (4.5/sq mi) in 2021.

In the 2016 Census of Population, the RM of Meota No. 468 recorded a population of 933 living in 395 of its 837 total private dwellings, a −0.3% change from its 2011 population of 936. With a land area of 651.06 km^{2} (251.38 sq mi), it had a population density of 1.4/km^{2} (3.7/sq mi) in 2016.

== Attractions ==
- Cochin Bridge
- Jackfish Lake
- Meota Regional Park
- The Battlefords Provincial Park

== Government ==
The RM of Meota No. 468 is governed by an elected municipal council and an appointed administrator that meets on the first Wednesday of every month. The reeve of the RM is Sherry Jimmy while its administrator is Kirk Morrison. The RM's office is located in Meota.

== Transportation ==
- Saskatchewan Highway 4
- Saskatchewan Highway 26
- Saskatchewan Highway 769
- Canadian Pacific Railway (abandoned)

== See also ==
- List of rural municipalities in Saskatchewan
