= Cochin, Saskatchewan =

Resort village in Saskatchewan, Canada

Cochin
- Resort village
- Resort Village of Cochin
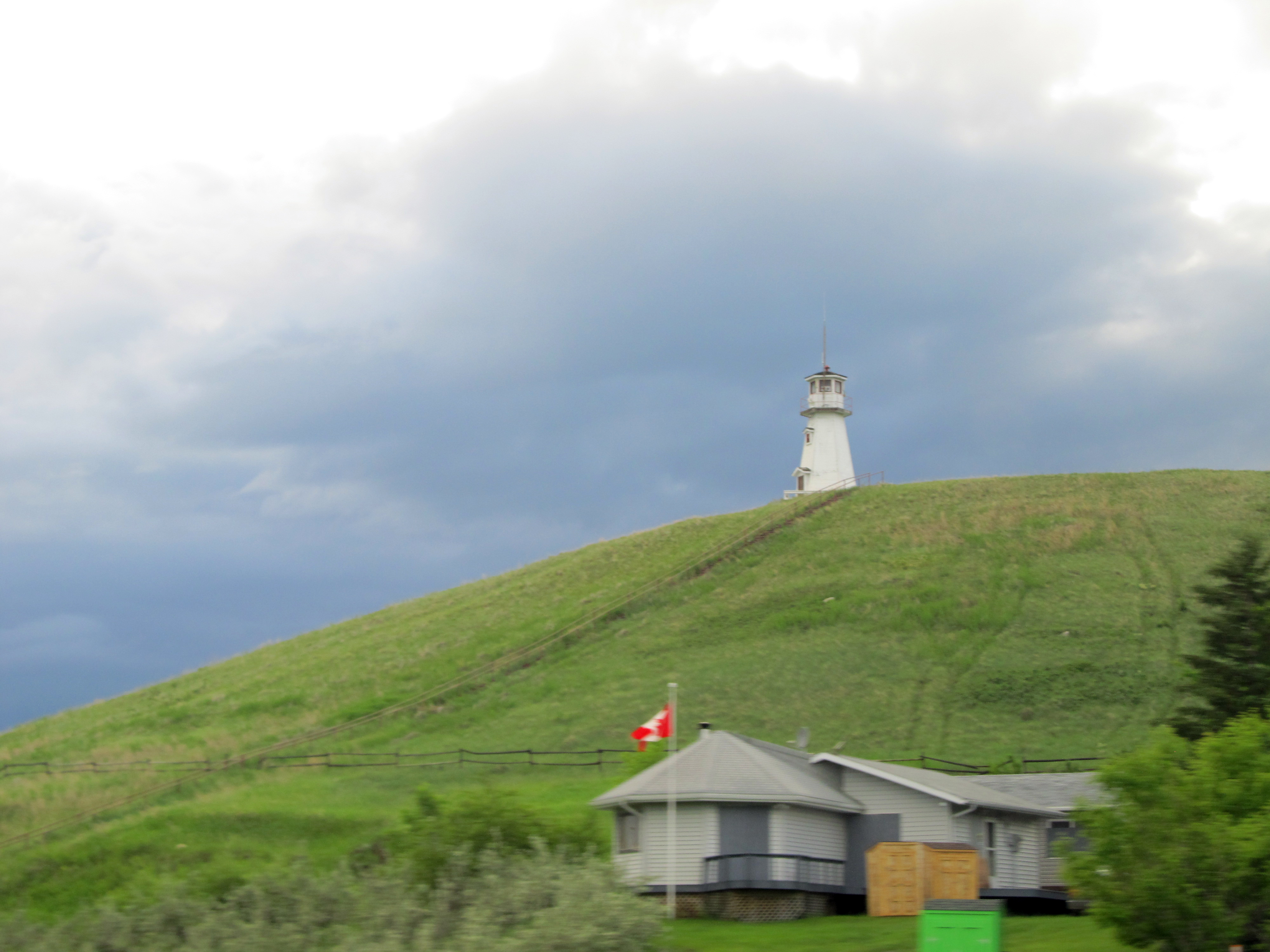
- Lighthouse atop Pirot Hill overlooking Jackfish Lake

- Location within Saskatchewan
- Coordinates: 53.078°N 108.339°W
- Country: Canada
- Province: Saskatchewan
- Census division: 17
- Rural municipality: Meota No. 468
- Incorporated: January 1, 1988

Government
  - Mayor: Harvey Walker
  - Governing body: Resort Village Council
  - Administrator: Amber Loeppky

Area (2016)
  - Land: 1.35 km^{2} (0.52 sq mi)

Population (2016)
  - Total: 148
  - Density: 109.6/km^{2} (284/sq mi)
- Time zone: CST
  - Summer (DST): CST
- Postal code: S0M 0L0
- Area codes: 306 and 639
- Highway(s): Highway 4; Highway 769
- Waterway(s): Jackfish Lake

Cochin (2016 population: 148) is a resort village in the Canadian province of Saskatchewan within Census Division No. 17. It is on the eastern shore Jackfish Lake on the isthmus that separates Jackfish and Murray Lakes in the Rural Municipality of Meota No. 468. Access is from Highway 4.

== History ==
French traders referred to the immediate area of Cochin as les Détroits before the village was created.

Cochin was founded by father Louis Cochin, originally as a Christian mission. Louis Cochin was himself a french-born Oblate Order missionary. Cochin was incorporated as a resort village on January 1, 1988.

== Demographics ==
Population history (1981–2016)
Year	Pop.	±%
1981		—
1986		—
1991	166	—
1996	150	−9.6%
2001	136	−9.3%
2006	208	+52.9%
2011	122	−41.3%
2016	148	+21.3%
Source: Statistics Canada via Saskatchewan Bureau of Statistics

In the 2021 Census of Population conducted by Statistics Canada, Cochin had a population of 219 living in 116 of its 385 total private dwellings, a change of 48% from its 2016 population of 148. With a land area of 1.32 km^{2} (0.51 sq mi), it had a population density of 165.9/km^{2} (429.7/sq mi) in 2021.

In the 2016 Census of Population conducted by Statistics Canada, the Resort Village of Cochin recorded a population of 148 living in 80 of its 442 total private dwellings, a 21.3% change from its 2011 population of 122. With a land area of 1.35 km^{2} (0.52 sq mi), it had a population density of 109.6/km^{2} (283.9/sq mi) in 2016.

== Government ==
The Resort Village of Cochin is governed by an elected municipal council and an appointed administrator that meets on the first Tuesday of every month. The mayor is Harvey Walker and its administrator is Amber Loeppky.

== Transportation ==
The Cochin Bridge provides pedestrian access across Lehman Creek into the resort village.

== See also ==
- List of communities in Saskatchewan
- List of francophone communities in Saskatchewan
- List of resort villages in Saskatchewan
- List of summer villages in Alberta
