= Monnery River =

River in Saskatchewan, Canada

Monnery River Red Deer River
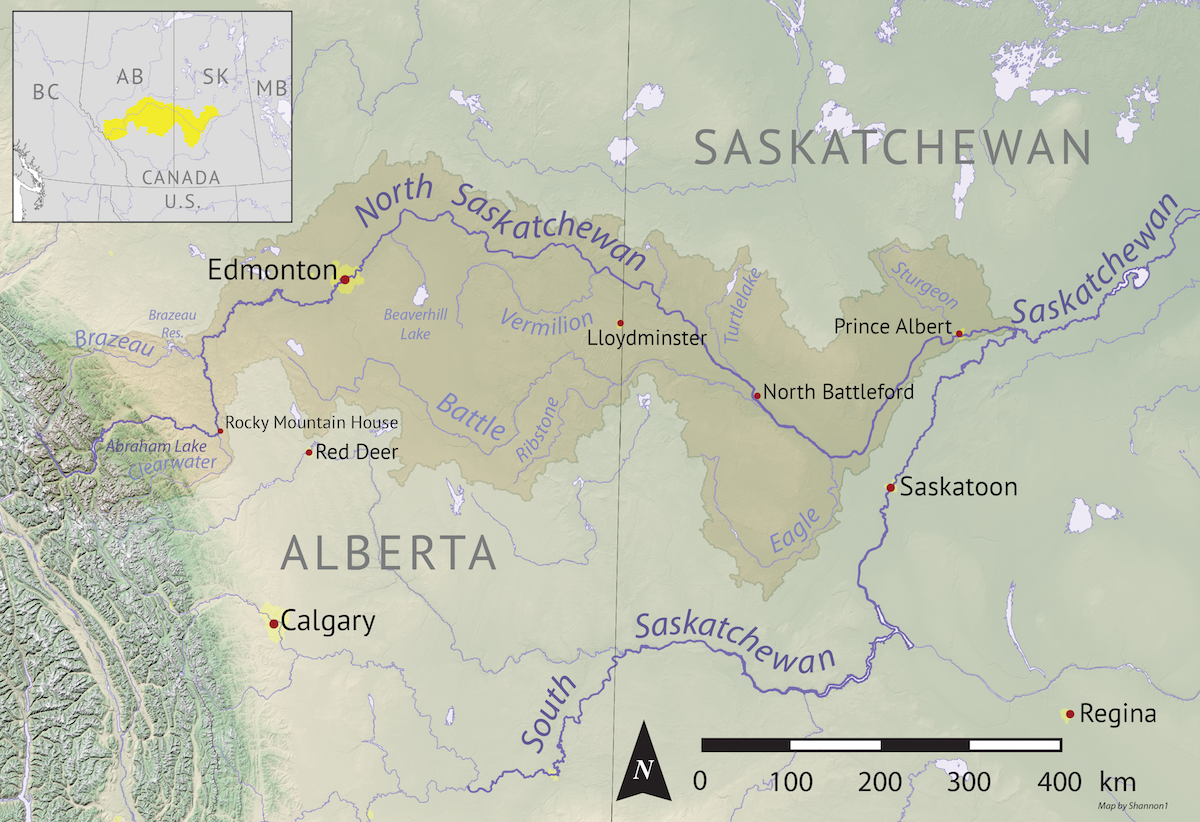
- The North Saskatchewan River drainage basin

- Location of the river's mouth in Saskatchewan Monnery River (Canada)

Location
- Country: Canada
- Province: Saskatchewan

Physical characteristics
- Source: Peck Lake
  - location: Bronson Forest Recreation Site
  - coordinates: 53.8775°N 109.5893°W
- Mouth: North Saskatchewan River
  - location: RM of Frenchman Butte No. 501
  - coordinates: 53.4998°N 109.5651°W

Basin features
- River system: Saskatchewan River
- Tributaries
  - left: Glenbogie Creek
- Waterbodies: Phone Lake

Monnery River, formerly known as Red Deer River, is a river in the Canadian province of Saskatchewan. It begins at Peck Lake in the Bronson Forest Recreation Site and flows southward into the North Saskatchewan River.

== Description ==
The Monnery River begins at Peck Lake in the Bronson Forest area of the Meadow Lake Escarpment in the Rural Municipality of Loon Lake No. 561 and flows south into the North Saskatchewan River. There are several lakes near the river's headwaters that contribute to its flow, some of which include, Little Fishing Lake, Galletly Lake, Round Lake, Cash Lake, and the bifurcating Worthington Lake. A creek flows north out of Worthington Lake into Ministikwan Lake of the Churchill River drainage basin and another flows south out of the lake and into Galletly and Peck Lakes of the Saskatchewan River drainage basin.

Monnery River flows out of the southern end of Peck Lake near the campground. It is followed by Highway 21 past Little Fishing Lake and the community of the same name. The highway roughly parallels the river southward as it leaves the Bronson Forest and enters a landscape of rural farmland. As the river nears its terminus, it enters a coulee that opens up into a valley. At this point, the east–west Highway 3 crosses the river just west of the community of Paradise Hill. A short distance later, the Monnery River empties into the North Saskatchewan River. To the north of the river's mouth is Frenchman Butte and to the east is Paradise Hill. Adjacent to the river's mouth is Deer Creek and the North Tangleflags CNRL heavy oil production facility.

== Fish species ==
Fish species commonly found in Monnery River include lake sturgeon, walleye, and white sucker.

== See also ==
- List of rivers of Saskatchewan
- Hudson Bay drainage basin
- Tourism in Saskatchewan
