= St. Anthony's Indian Residential School =

St. Anthony’s Indian Residential School was a residential school located on Seekaskootch Onion Lake Reserve of the Cree Nation, under Treaty 6, in Saskatchewan, Canada. It operated from 1894 until its closure in 1974. It was managed by the Roman Catholic Church by the Sisters of the Assumption, the Oblates of Mary Immaculate, and the Oblate Indian and Eskimo Council.

The school underwent several name changes and a location change during the course of its operation. From 1895 to 1924, it was named Onion Lake Roman Catholic Boarding School. From 1931 to 1968, it was named St. Anthony’s (Onion Lake) Indian Residential School. At the end of its operation, from 1969 to 1974, it was named St. Anthony’s (Onion Lake) Student Residence.

== History ==
=== Beginnings of Catholic school at Onion Lake ===
The first Catholic mission in Onion Lake was founded in 1884 by Father Marchand. A request for a Catholic school in Onion Lake was proposed in February of 1884 by Father Marchand and Father Fafard but was refused by the Department of Indian Affairs. Nonetheless, Father Marchand instructed children at the mission until his death in the Frog Lake Massacre in 1885. In 1888, a Catholic day school was opened by Father Vachon.

The Sisters of Assumption arrived to Onion Lake in 1891, operating the day school and its transition into boarding school. Onion Lake Roman Catholic Boarding School was officially recognized by the Department of Indian Affairs on July 1st, 1894.

Towards the end of the 19th century, the government of Canada shifted funding towards industrial or boarding schools, later both termed residential schools, as opposed to day schools. These schools kept children at the school for almost the entire year, reflecting the government’s goal to assimilate Indigenous children into white, Christian culture.

In 1894, the Canadian government amended the Indian Act to require all Indigenous children older than 7 to attend school. This law was enforced by the North West Mounted Police.

=== Buildings ===
The first building intended to be used as the Onion Lake Roman Catholic Boarding School burned down completely on Feb 17, 1894, before it could be used for schooling. Construction began on a replacement building in November of 1894 and was completed in November of 1895. The building was 35’ by 45’ and had three stories.

In 1925, it was announced that a new building would be constructed. The recent reconstruction of the Anglican boarding school spurred competition, alongside the age of the Catholic school and its lack of modern features. In 1927, a new building was constructed 4 miles south of the original location.

=== Fires ===
Two significant fires occurred during the course of the Onion Lake Roman Catholic School’s operation. On September 19, 1913, a fire was started in the girls' lavatory but did not destroy the building. However, damages cost $250. On February 10, 1928, a fire burned the school completely and classes were cancelled until September of that year. The cause of the fire was not discovered by authorities. At this time, a new school building had already been in construction and was ready to be moved into for fall of 1928.

== Life at school ==
=== Arrival at school ===
Upon arrival at the school, each student was given a number by which they were referred. Joseph Dion, an alumnus of Onion Lake, was branded number 7, making him one of the first students to attend the school.

=== Assimilation and curriculum ===
The parents of students and any traditional Indigenous ways of being were referred to in a derogatory manner by the staff of the school, effectively alienating the children from their own families and cultures. The focus was on assimilating them into white settler culture through a curriculum that focused on the English language, catechism and training for a future as manual labourers or housewives according to traditional European gender roles. As such, every morning students went to mass and then spent a significant portion of their day on Catholic teachings. Additionally, the three and a half hours that students were permitted to spend outside, although referred to as free time by administrators, was dedicated to chores such as, in the case of the boys, wood splitting and sawing. Attempts were frequently made to keep, often orphaned, girls of 16 or older at school for longer until the principal could arrange a marriage to former students so as to keep them from reintegrating into their Indigenous culture. Accounts vary as to whether students were allowed to speak Cree. Some say that the nuns allowed students to speak the language in their free time, while others say that they were given the strap or slapped if they were caught speaking it.

=== Punishment and abuse ===
Shaving of hair and corporal punishment such as ear twisting, slapping or getting the strap were commonly used as disciplinary measures. Shirley Waskewitch, a survivor of the residential school, recounted a time that she faked a toothache to escape an abusive teacher and had one of her molars pulled out with pliers, unmedicated, by one of the nuns before being sent back to class. There was one recounted incident of a student being impregnated by one of the Oblate Fathers who was then sent home to give birth.

=== Food and hygiene ===
Students were permitted to bathe once a week on Saturdays, but no toothbrushes were given to them.

Although official records of inspection show that students were properly fed, the institution was given two weeks notice before an evaluation took place. Nancy Half, a school survivor, recounted that while the staff ate well cooked, balanced meals, the food students were offered was spoiled and to this day she cannot stomach stew because it reminds her of the rotten stew she was offered. She spoke of stealing food because she was always hungry.

=== Allotment of funds ===
By 1900, six years after its opening in 1894, the school had an ever-increasing student body and was already considered overcrowded. Requests were made to the Department of Indian Affairs for funds towards building expansion, but upon refusal they enlisted current students, usually the older boys and people from the reserve, to complete the necessary construction and upkeep. When funds were made available by the Department, school administrators often prioritized the allocation towards staff comfort rather than student needs and well-being. A request for additional heating stoves for only the principal and nuns’ personal quarters was made, with the justification that it was too expensive to use the furnace to heat the entire school.

=== Vacation time ===
In the first decade or so of its existence, students were kept at school 364 days a year and were only permitted leave to travel home to their families from 8am to 7pm on July 1^{st}. This policy later changed to allow students one month of vacation on the condition that they were well behaved during the school year. However, students who lived far from the Onion Lake reserve or were from a different reserve all together often remained at school as the cost of transportation, which was assumed by the school or diverted to the parents, was deemed too high.

=== Amebicide study ===
A study was done on 28 students of St. Anthony’s following an outbreak of Entamoeba histolytica dysentery (amoebiasis) in 1964. The illness is associated with poor sanitation and can be transmitted via contaminated water or food, infected fecal matter coming in contact with the mouth, or swallowing the bacterium from a surface or fingers contaminated with E. histolytica. The 28 students tested positive for the parasite and were given Furamide as treatment. Dr. R. D. F. Eaton concluded there were not enough students in the study to produce any meaningful results. According to the Truth and Reconciliation Commission of Canada, there is little to no evidence that the parents or children were spoken to for any approval for this study.

== Death toll ==
The death toll at Onion Lake Roman Catholic Boarding School was largely related to illnesses that would infect many students and some of the staff. Since there were no doctors on the reserve in the early years of the school, the Sisters were the ones taking care of the children when diseases erupted. Infections would spread quickly because of the number of children overcrowding the facilities, making outbreaks difficult to contain.

=== Tuberculosis ===
Tuberculosis epidemics were often infecting the Onion Lake reserve, and many cases were recorded at the school. Tuberculosis was mentioned twice in the reports between 1911 to 1920. Records show that tuberculosis caused the death of an unnamed student in 1913 and another in 1918, Christine Dumont. However, according to the agent who would report back to the Onion Lake Agency, it is unlikely that these were the only two deaths related to tuberculosis during those years.

Between 1921 to 1930, several more cases of tuberculosis were recorded. In 1921, 1923, and 1930 respectively, three girls passed away from the infection, as well as two boys sent to the hospital in 1925. The Sisters' secretary records indicate there may have been other cases of tuberculosis deaths between those years. As of 1964, cases had declined significantly with 93% of kindergarten students testing negative.

=== Other illnesses ===
In 1902 and in 1918, influenza epidemics hit Onion Lake Roman Catholic Boarding School. Both times, all children and some staff were infected. Influenza caused the death of one child in the 1902 epidemic and eleven children in the 1913 epidemic.

Other diseases such as measles and diphtheria also infected the school throughout the years. Multiple cases of measles were recorded, noted during the years 1901, 1925, 1930, 1937, and 1944, with one death mentioned. Another testimony from Joseph Dion refers to diphtheria taking the lives of many of the children attending school with him. Cases of typhoid, mumps, smallpox, whooping cough, and pneumonia were also recurrent at the school, with some children having to visit the hospital for recovery.

== Testimonies ==
According to Joseph Dion, disease was a prominent component at the school. The most impactful illness as described by Joseph was tuberculosis, leaving such an impact on him and his classmates that they labeled students who developed the symptoms as “branded for the grave”. However, he also describes students falling ill with measles, diphtheria, chicken pox and scarlet fever.

Shirley Waskewitch described being isolated in an infirmary room for an extended period, and being uninformed of her condition while being treated for a lung illness at the school. She said that the door was kept locked and was only opened to place a tray inside before being locked again. She described the experience as terrifying and lonely.
