= Peck Lake (Saskatchewan) =

Lake in Saskatchewan, Canada

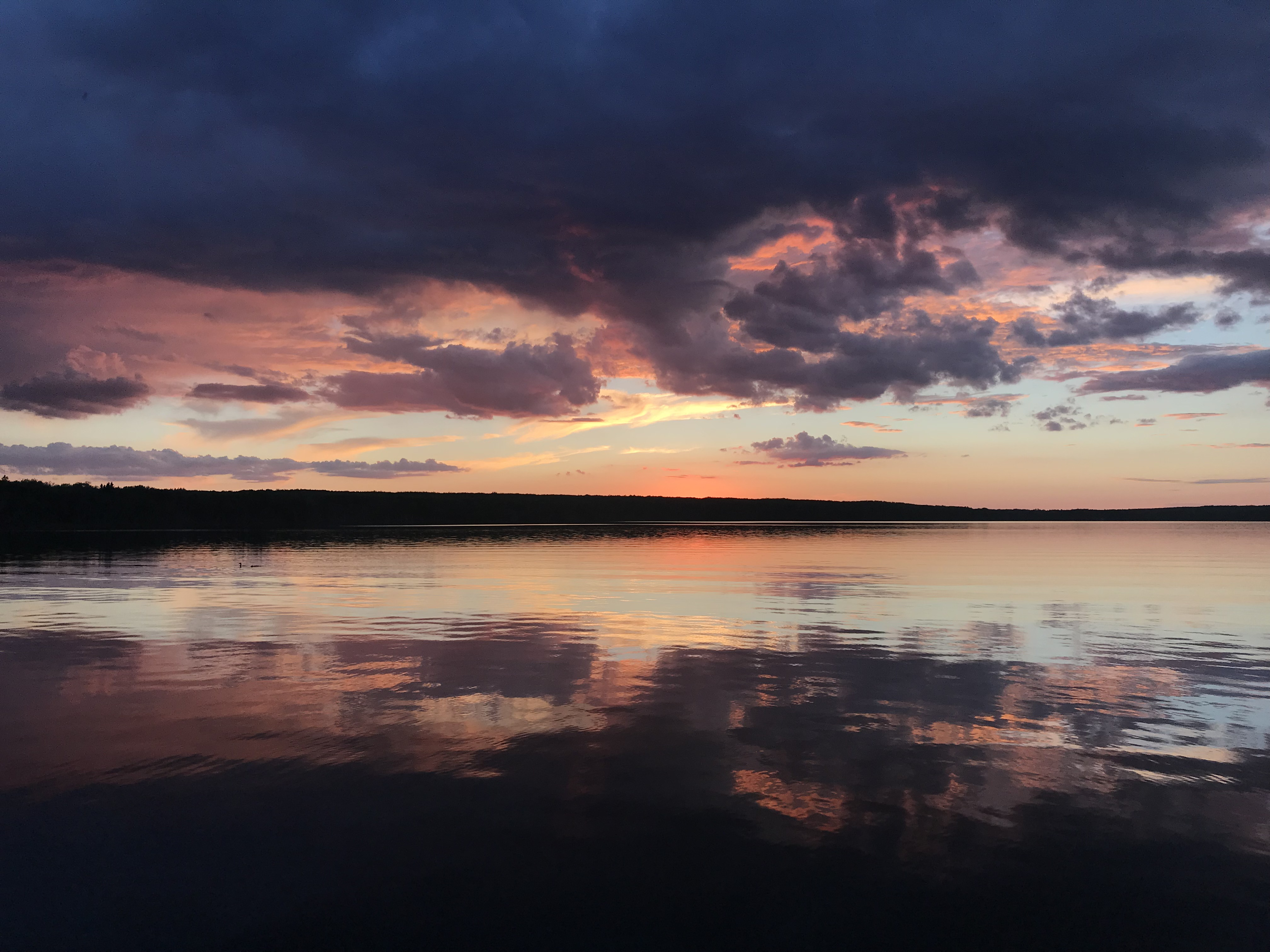
- Calm Evening on Peck Lake

- Location in Saskatchewan Peck Lake (Canada)
- Location: RM of Loon Lake No. 561, Saskatchewan
- Coordinates: 53°52′53″N 109°34′50″W
- Part of: Saskatchewan River drainage basin
- Primary inflows: Galletly Lake
- River sources: Meadow Lake Escarpment
- Primary outflows: Monnery River
- Basin countries: Canada
- Max. length: 4.52 km (2.81 mi)
- Max. width: 2.78 km (1.73 mi)
- Surface area: 736.2 ha (1,819 acres)
- Max. depth: 14 m (46 ft)
- Shore length^{1}: 20.1 km (12.5 mi)
- ^{1} Shore length is not a well-defined measure.

Peck Lake (/ˌpɛkˈleɪk/; French: lac Peck), a lake in the Canadian province of Saskatchewan, is located in the Bronson Forest Recreation Site in the Rural Municipality of Loon Lake No. 561, 27 kilometres (17 mi) east of the Alberta border. Access to the lake and its amenities is from Highway 21.

== Geography ==
Known for its bright turquoise-coloured water, unlike most other lakes in the region, Peck Lake is a popular spot for beachgoers, fishermen, and boaters. Peck Lake reaches a depth of 14 metres (46 ft). Water flows southward across the lake, entering Peck Lake from Galletly Lake and exiting into the Monnery River. Monnery River is a tributary of the North Saskatchewan River. The south-eastern shore of the lake is subdivided into 50 lots, 45 of which have permanent structures.

== Camping ==
Peck Lake has one government-run campground, split into two sections: the beachfront campsites and the "overflow" forested campsites. Facilities include washrooms, a picnic shelter, fish-filleting table, sewage dump, and a swingset. The beachfront campground is situated directly next to the boat launch, providing easy access for launching watercraft. Each campsite has a picnic table, firepit, electrical plug, and free access to firewood.

== Fish species ==
Sport fish commonly found in Peck Lake include walleye, northern pike, yellow perch, lake whitefish, and burbot. White sucker, spottail shiner, and brook stickleback also inhabit Peck Lake.

== See also ==
- List of lakes of Saskatchewan
