= Horsehills Creek =

- Location of mouth

Location
- Country: Canada
- Province: Alberta

Physical characteristics
- Mouth: North Saskatchewan River
  - coordinates: 53°37′59″N 113°19′32″W

Basin features
- River system: Saskatchewan River

Horsehills Creek is a creek that flows in the far northeastern corridor of the city of Edmonton, Alberta, Canada. The creek is a minor tributary to the North Saskatchewan River and is surrounded by agricultural fields and native vegetation. The City of Edmonton considers Horsehills Creek a designated protected site, because of the flora and fauna located in patches of forest and wetlands.

== Topography ==
The area is generally flat with some light sloping and low isolated hills. However, the creek's ravine itself is a much more sharper depression in the land as it drains into the river. The creek's banks are less steep upstream and tend to be shallow depressions in the surrounding land.

== Watercourse ==
Horsehills Creek is fed by sloughs and lakes which occur in the north of Edmonton; the creek's water levels tend to be low, especially in the summer when sloughs tend to dry out. It has many tributaries which all join as one large creek, a portion of which is culverted in order for it to flow rather than filling it. There are no known manmade courses for the creek to follow. Horsehills Creek is also fed by groundwater, generally in the ravine portion. Its hydrology is very similar to that of Rat Creek except that it flows through its entire length and has not been changed nor destroyed throughout its history.
