= Ministikwan 161 =

Indian reserve in Saskatchewan, Canada

Coordinates: 54°01′47″N 109°41′31″W

- Indian reserve
- Ministikwan Indian Reserve No. 161
- Location in Saskatchewan
- First Nation: Ministikwan Lake
- Country: Canada
- Province: Saskatchewan

Area
  - Total: 8,349.3 ha (20,632 acres)

Population (2016)
  - Total: 624
  - Density: 7.47/km^{2} (19.4/sq mi)
- Community Well-Being Index: 38

Ministikwan 161, also known as Island Lake No. 161, is an Indian reserve of the Ministikwan Lake Cree Nation in Saskatchewan. The reserve is about 161 kilometres (100 mi) north-west of North Battleford. It is adjacent to the Bronson Forest Recreation Site and surrounds most of Ministikwan Lake.

In the 2016 Canadian Census, it recorded a population of 624 living in 128 of its 150 total private dwellings. In the same year, its Community Well-Being index was calculated at 38 of 100, compared to 58.4 for the average First Nations community and 77.5 for the average non-Indigenous community.

== See also ==
- List of Indian reserves in Saskatchewan
- Ministikwan 161A
