= John Rogers (ice hockey, born 1953) =

Canadian ice hockey player

- Born: April 10, 1953 (age 71); Paradise Hill, Saskatchewan, Canada
- Height: 5 ft 11 in (180 cm)
- Weight: 175 lb (79 kg; 12 st 7 lb)
- Position: Right wing
- Shot: Right
- Played for: Minnesota North Stars; Edmonton Oilers
- NHL draft: 25th overall, 1973; Minnesota North Stars
- WHA draft: 6th overall, 1973; Alberta Oilers
- Playing career: 1973–1976

Alfred John Rogers (born April 10, 1953) is a Canadian former professional ice hockey winger who played 14 games in the National Hockey League for the Minnesota North Stars during the 1973–74 and 1974–75 seasons. He also played 44 games in the World Hockey Association with the Edmonton Oilers during the 1975–76 season.

Rogers was born in Paradise Hill, Saskatchewan, and raised in Frenchman Butte, Saskatchewan.

== Career statistics ==
=== Regular season and playoffs ===
			Regular season					Playoffs
Season	Team	League	GP	G	A	Pts	PIM	GP	G	A	Pts	PIM
1970–71	Edmonton Oil Kings	WCHL	57	27	16	43	218	—	—	—	—	—
1971–72	Edmonton Oil Kings	WCHL	46	26	27	53	236	—	—	—	—	—
1972–73	Edmonton Oil Kings	WCHL	68	63	41	104	219	—	—	—	—	—
1973–74	New Haven Nighthawks	AHL	54	16	18	34	73	10	1	1	2	0
1973–74	Minnesota North Stars	NHL	10	2	4	6	0	—	—	—	—	—
1974–75	New Haven Nighthawks	AHL	54	16	18	34	41	2	0	0	0	0
1974–75	Minnesota North Stars	NHL	4	0	0	0	0	—	—	—	—	—
1975–76	Spokane Flyers	WIHL	6	6	2	8	0	—	—	—	—	—
1975–76	Edmonton Oilers	WHA	44	9	8	17	34	—	—	—	—	—
WHA totals			44	9	8	17	34	—	—	—	—	—
NHL totals			14	2	4	6	0	—	—	—	—	—
