= Frenchman Butte, Saskatchewan =

Community in Saskatchewan, Canada

Frenchman Butte
- Organized hamlet
- Location of Frenchman Butte in Saskatchewan Frenchman Butte (Canada)
- Coordinates: 53.593°N 109.634°W
- Country: Canada
- Province: Saskatchewan
- Census division: 17
- Rural municipality (RM): Frenchman Butte No. 501

Government
  - Governing body: RM of Frenchman Butte No. 501

Area (2016)
  - Total: 0.73 km^{2} (0.28 sq mi)

Population (2016)
  - Total: 53
  - Density: 73/km^{2} (190/sq mi)
- Time zone: CST
- Area code: 306
- Highways: Highway 797
- Waterways: North Saskatchewan River

Frenchman Butte (2016 population: 53) is an organized hamlet within the Rural Municipality of Frenchman Butte No. 501 in the Canadian province of Saskatchewan. It is also recognized as a designated place by Statistics Canada. Frenchman Butte is along Highway 797 on the north shore of the North Saskatchewan River, approximately 43 kilometres (27 mi) northeast of the city of Lloydminster. It is named after Frenchman Butte, a locally-prominent landform, which was near the site of the 1885 Battle of Frenchman's Butte during the North-West Rebellion.

== Demographics ==
In the 2021 Census of Population conducted by Statistics Canada, Frenchman Butte had a population of 235 living in 20 of its 24 total private dwellings, a change of 343.4% from its 2016 population of 53. With a land area of 0.77 km^{2} (0.30 sq mi), it had a population density of 305.2/km^{2} (790.5/sq mi) in 2021.

== See also ==
- List of communities in Saskatchewan
