= Little Fishing Lake =

Lake in Saskatchewan, Canada

- Location in Saskatchewan Little Fishing Lake (Canada)
- Location: Bronson Forest, Saskatchewan
- Coordinates: 53.8668°N 109.5508°W
- Part of: Saskatchewan River drainage basin
- River sources: Meadow Lake Escarpment
- Basin countries: Canada
- Surface area: 394.4 ha (975 acres)
- Max. depth: 29.3 m (96 ft)
- Shore length^{1}: 13.6 km (8.5 mi)
- Surface elevation: 628 m (2,060 ft)
- Settlements: Little Fishing Lake
- ^{1} Shore length is not a well-defined measure.

Little Fishing Lake is a lake in the east-central region of the Canadian province of Saskatchewan. It is a recreational lake located within the Bronson Forest Provincial Recreation Site. The lake is in the Monnery River drainage basin, which is a tributary of the North Saskatchewan River. It is connected to the river via a short stream from its western shore.

On Little Fishing Lake's eastern shore is the community of Little Fishing Lake and a campground. Access to the lake and its amenities is from Highway 21.

== Fish species ==
Fish commonly found in Little Fishing Lake include walleye, northern pike, and northern hogsucker.

== See also ==
- List of lakes of Saskatchewan
- Tourism in Saskatchewan
