= Ministikwan Lake =

Lake in Saskatchewan, Canada

- Location in Saskatchewan Ministikwan Lake (Canada)
- Location: West-central Saskatchewan
- Coordinates: 54.0168°N 109.6508°W
- Etymology: Cree for "it is an island"
- Part of: Churchill River drainage basin
- River sources: Meadow Lake Escarpment
- Primary outflows: Ministikwan Creek
- Basin countries: Canada
- Max. length: 9 km (5.6 mi)
- Surface area: 2,773 ha (6,850 acres)
- Max. depth: 25.6 m (84 ft)
- Shore length^{1}: 58 km (36 mi)
- Surface elevation: 570 m (1,870 ft)
- Islands: Bear Island
- Settlements: Ministikwan 161 Indian reserve
- ^{1} Shore length is not a well-defined measure.

Ministikwan Lake is a lake in the Canadian province of Saskatchewan. Ministikwan is Cree for "it is an island". The lake is about 32 kilometres (20 mi) west of the village of Loon Lake within the Bronson Forest on the Meadow Lake Escarpment. About three-quarters of it is surrounded by the Ministikwan 161 Indian reserve while the rest is in the Bronson Forest Recreation Site.

Ministikwan Lake has a housing subdivision, lodge, campgrounds, Bible camp, outfitters, beach, and a boat launch. Access is from Highway 21. Highway 699's western terminus is at Highway 21 at Ministikwan Lake's eastern end. The band office for the Ministikwan Lake Cree Nation—also known as Island Lake First Nation—is at the lake.

== Description ==
Ministikwan Lake covers an area of 2,773 hectares (6,850 acres), is 25.6 metres (84 ft) deep, and has a shoreline that is about 58 kilometres (36 mi) long. The lake is within the Beaver River watershed in west-central Saskatchewan. The Beaver River is a major tributary of the east-flowing Churchill River. Several small rivers flow into the lake from the surrounding hills and forest while its outflow, Ministikwan Creek, leaves the lake at the eastern end and heads east into Makwa Lake. Ministikwan Lake is within the Bronson Forest and is surrounded by Ministikwan 161 Indian reserve and Bronson Forest Recreation Site. The main village for the Indian reserve is on the lake's northern shore.

== Recreation ==
Most of the recreational facilities at Ministikwan Lake are at the eastern end of the lake with access roads off Highway 21. There are amenities such as a beach, boat launch, lodging, and an outfitters. Facilities include Summer Escape RV Resort, Ministikwan Lodge, Ministikwan Lake Youth Camp, Southridge Bible Camp, and Johnson's Outfitters. Johnson's Outfitters operates a campground and has bear and deer hunting packages.

== Fish species ==
Fish commonly found in Ministikwan Lake include northern pike, yellow perch, walleye, lake whitefish, burbot, white sucker, and cisco.

== See also ==
- List of lakes of Saskatchewan
- Tourism in Saskatchewan
