= Makaoo 120 =

Indian reserve in Western Canada

Coordinates: 53°40′36″N 110°01′14″W

- Indian reserve
- Makaoo Indian Reserve No. 120
- Location in Alberta
- First Nation: Onion Lake Cree
- Treaty: 6
- Country: Canada
- Provinces: Alberta; Saskatchewan
- Municipal districts: Frenchman Butte; Vermilion River

Area
  - Total: 5,626.6 ha (13,904 acres)

Population (2016)
  - Total: 726
  - Density: 12.9/km^{2} (33.4/sq mi)
- Time zone: UTC−06:00 (Alberta Time)

Makaoo 120 is an Indian reserve of the Onion Lake Cree Nation in Alberta and Saskatchewan, located between the County of Vermilion River and the Rural Municipality of Frenchman Butte No. 501. It is about 42 kilometres (26 mi) north of Lloydminster. In the 2016 Canadian Census, it recorded a population of 726 living in 165 of its 179 total private dwellings.

== See also ==
- List of Indian reserves in Alberta
- List of Indian reserves in Saskatchewan
