= Frenchman Butte =

Mountain in Saskatchewan, Canada

- Interactive map of Frenchman Butte
- Location: Frenchman Butte, Frenchman Butte No. 501, Saskatchewan, Canada
- Coordinates: 53°37′38″N 109°34′33″W
- Website: www.frenchmanbuttemuseum.ca

National Historic Site of Canada
- Official name: Frenchman Butte National Historic Site of Canada
- Designated: 1929

Frenchman Butte is a butte located 45 kilometres (28 mi) northeast of Lloydminster, is named after a Frenchman who was killed there by Indians in the 19th century. It is not known how or why this man was murdered. This was also the site of the Battle of Frenchman's Butte between Major-General Thomas Bland Strange and Cree Chief Big Bear during the North-West rebellion.

The site of the battle was designated a National Historic Site of Canada in 1929.

== See also ==
- List of mountains of Saskatchewan
- Geography of Saskatchewan
