= Onion Lake 119-2 =

Indian reserve in Saskatchewan, Canada

Coordinates: 53°42′55″N 109°49′07″W

- Indian reserve
- Onion Lake Indian Reserve No. 119-2
- Location in Saskatchewan
- First Nation: Onion Lake
- Country: Canada
- Province: Saskatchewan

Area
  - Total: 1,573.5 ha (3,888 acres)

Onion Lake 119-2 is an Indian reserve of the Onion Lake Cree Nation in Saskatchewan. It is about 37 kilometres (23 mi) west of St. Walburg.

== See also ==
- List of Indian reserves in Saskatchewan
