= Fowler Lake =

Lake in Saskatchewan, Canada

- Location in Saskatchewan Fowler Lake (Canada)
- Location: RM of Loon Lake No. 561, Saskatchewan
- Coordinates: 54.0168°N 109.4008°W
- Part of: Churchill River drainage basin
- Basin countries: Canada
- Surface area: 134.8 ha (333 acres)
- Max. depth: 8.3 m (27 ft)
- Shore length^{1}: 17.3 km (10.7 mi)
- Surface elevation: 547 m (1,795 ft)
- ^{1} Shore length is not a well-defined measure.

Fowler Lake is a lake in the Canadian province of Saskatchewan. It is in the RM of Loon Lake No. 561, west of Makwa Lake and Makwa Lake Provincial Park. Access to the lake and its amenities is via Highway 699.

The lake is named after Albert Edward Fowell.

== Description ==
Fowler Lake is in the Boreal Transition ecozone and is surrounded by a forest of trembling aspen, balsam poplar, white spruce, and balsam fir.

West and upstream of Fowler Lake is Murphy Lake, which is separated by an isthmus and connected by a short stream. Fowler Lake's outflow is at the eastern end, and it flows eastward meandering through forest and muskeg before emptying into Makwa Lake.

== Recreation ==
Fowler Lake Recreation Site (54.0184°N 109.4142°W) is a provincial recreation area that encompasses most of the western half of Fowler Lake, the eastern shore of Murphy Lake, and the isthmus separating the two lakes. The park offers access to both lakes and provides accommodations. FireSong Resort is located within the park, on the north-western shore of Fowler Lake.

== See also ==
- List of lakes of Saskatchewan
- List of protected areas of Saskatchewan
- Tourism in Saskatchewan
