= Onion Lake 119-1 =

Indian reserve in Saskatchewan, Canada

Coordinates: 53°55′21″N 109°54′58″W

- Indian reserve
- Onion Lake Indian Reserve No. 119-1
- Location in Saskatchewan
- First Nation: Onion Lake
- Country: Canada
- Province: Saskatchewan

Area
  - Total: 35,878.8 ha (88,658 acres)

Population (2016)
  - Total: 0
  - Density: 0.0/km^{2} (0.0/sq mi)

Onion Lake 119-1 is an Indian reserve of the Onion Lake Cree Nation in Saskatchewan. In the 2016 Canadian Census, it recorded a population of 0 living in 0 of its 0 total private dwellings.

== See also ==
- List of Indian reserves in Saskatchewan
