= Bronson Forest Recreation Site =

Provincial park in Saskatchewan, Canada

Bronson Forest Provincial Recreation Site
- Location within Saskatchewan Location within Canada
- Location: Saskatchewan
- Nearest city: Loon Lake
- Coordinates: 53.9263°N 109.5769°W
- Area: 15,240 ha (37,700 acres)
- Governing body: Sask Parks

Bronson Forest Recreation Site is a provincial recreation park in the west-central region of Saskatchewan, Canada. The park covers 15,240 hectares (37,700 acres) of the Bronson Forest in the Rural Municipality of Loon Lake No. 561. It is on the Meadow Lake Escarpment and straddles the divide between the North Saskatchewan River and Beaver River watersheds. The park encompasses the headwaters of the Monnery River, a tributary of the North Saskatchewan River, and Ministikwan Creek, which is within the Beaver River watershed. There are campgrounds, hiking trails, and multiple lakes accessible for recreation and fishing. Access to the park and its amenities is from Highway 21.

The Bronson Forest is in the boreal forest transition zone and is made up of trembling aspen, willow, balsam poplar, white spruce, jack pine, paper birch, and black spruce trees. The landscape consists of rolling hills, lakes, muskeg, and meadows. The forest is known for its wild ponies. Other animals found there include moose, wolves, white-tailed deer, Canada lynx, black bears, beaver, river otters, coyotes, snowshoe hares, and cottontail rabbits.

== Recreation and amenities ==
The main facilities and amenities are located at Peck Lake and Little Fishing Lake. Little Fishing Lake has a campground, sandy beach, fishing, and boating. The community of Little Fishing Lake is beside the campground on the western shore. Peck Lake has a campground, sandy beach, cabins and cottages, and lake access for boating and fishing.

There are several other accessible lakes in the park. Most of the lakes, including the aforementioned Peck and Little Fishing, are well stocked. Some of these other lakes include Round, Worthington, Ministikwan, Galletly, Moonshine, Halfmoon (Spirit), Monnery, Bronson, Cache, Bear, and Spitser. Fish found in the lakes include northern pike, walleye, yellow perch, lake whitefish, white sucker, burbot, splake, and rainbow trout. Worthington Lake is a bifurcation lake with its northern outflow going into Ministikwan Lake and the Beaver River drainage basin via Ministikwan Creek and Makwa River and its southern outflow going into the North Saskatchewan River basin via Galletly and Peck Lakes and Monnery River. The northern end of the park runs along the southern and eastern shores of Ministikwan Lake. Johnson's Outfitters and Ministikwan Lodge are located along Ministikwan's eastern shore.

== Wild ponies of the Bronson Forest ==
The wild ponies are feral horses that live in the Bronson Forest in the meadows near Bronson Lake, which is west of the recreation site. In the 1990s, there were over 125 horses and by the early 2010s, that number had fallen to 35. Predation from wolves, poaching, and harsh winters have strained the population. Colts have a survival rate of only about 24%. Battles for leadership of the herd have caused smaller groups to split off from what used to be an inseparable herd; further increasing the risk of population decline from predation. It is the only known herd of feral horses in Saskatchewan and, in 2009, the Saskatchewan government passed legislation to protect the horses. At about 12 to 14 hands and lightly built, they are smaller than typical local domestic horses.

== See also ==
- List of Saskatchewan provincial forests
- List of protected areas of Saskatchewan
- Tourism in Saskatchewan
