= Rural Municipality of Loon Lake No. 561 =

Rural municipality in Saskatchewan, Canada

Loon Lake No. 561
- Rural municipality
- Rural Municipality of Loon Lake No. 561
- Location of the RM of Loon Lake No. 561 in Saskatchewan
- Coordinates: 54.079°N 109.468°W
- Country: Canada
- Province: Saskatchewan
- Census division: 17
- SARM division: 6
- Formed: January 1, 1978

Government
  - Reeve: Greg Cardinal
  - Governing body: RM of Loon Lake No. 561 Council
  - Administrator: Erin Simpson
  - Office location: Loon Lake

Area (2016)
  - Land: 2,805.1 km^{2} (1,083.1 sq mi)

Population (2016)
  - Total: 756
  - Density: 0.3/km^{2} (0.78/sq mi)
- Time zone: CST
  - Summer (DST): CST
- Area codes: 306 and 639

The Rural Municipality of Loon Lake No. 561 (2016 population: 756) is a rural municipality (RM) in the Canadian province of Saskatchewan within Census Division No. 17 and SARM Division No. 6.

== History ==
The RM of Loon Lake No. 561 incorporated as a rural municipality on January 1, 1978.

== Geography ==
=== Communities and localities ===
The following urban municipalities are surrounded by the RM.

Villages

- Loon Lake
- Makwa

The following unincorporated communities are within the RM.

Organized hamlets

- Little Fishing Lake

Localities

- Barthel
- Flat Valley
- Golden Ridge
- Horse Head
- Morin Creek
- Mudie Lake
- Murphy Lake
- Peck Lake
- Peerless
- Whelan

== Demographics ==
Population history (1981–2016)
Year	Pop.	±%
1981	1,023	—
1986	942	−7.9%
1991	930	−1.3%
1996	881	−5.3%
2001	788	−10.6%
2006	815	+3.4%
2011	725	−11.0%
2016	756	+4.3%
Source: Statistics Canada via Saskatchewan Bureau of Statistics

In the 2021 Census of Population conducted by Statistics Canada, the RM of Loon Lake No. 561 had a population of 836 living in 350 of its 697 total private dwellings, a change of 10.6% from its 2016 population of 756. With a land area of 3,148.06 km^{2} (1,215.47 sq mi), it had a population density of 0.3/km^{2} (0.7/sq mi) in 2021.

In the 2016 Census of Population, the RM of Loon Lake No. 561 recorded a population of 756 living in 306 of its 638 total private dwellings, a 4.3% change from its 2011 population of 725. With a land area of 2,805.1 km^{2} (1,083.1 sq mi), it had a population density of 0.3/km^{2} (0.7/sq mi) in 2016.

== Attractions ==
- Bronson Forest Provincial Recreation Site
- Fowler Lake Recreation Site
- Steele Narrows Provincial Park
- Big Bear Trail Museum

== Government ==
The RM of Loon Lake No. 561 is governed by an elected municipal council and an appointed administrator that meets on the second Wednesday of every month. The reeve of the RM is Greg Cardinal while its administrator is Erin Simpson. The RM's office is located in Loon Lake.

== Transportation ==
- Saskatchewan Highway 21
- Saskatchewan Highway 26
- Saskatchewan Highway 55
- Saskatchewan Highway 304
- Saskatchewan Highway 699
- Loon Lake Airport

== See also ==
- List of rural municipalities in Saskatchewan
