= Ministikwan 161A =

Indian reserve in Saskatchewan, Canada

Coordinates: 54°09′04″N 109°45′53″W

- Indian reserve
- Ministikwan Indian Reserve No. 161A
- Location in Saskatchewan
- First Nation: Ministikwan Lake
- Country: Canada
- Province: Saskatchewan

Area
  - Total: 2,771.3 ha (6,848 acres)

Population (2016)
  - Total: 223
  - Density: 8.05/km^{2} (20.8/sq mi)
- Community Well-Being Index: 35

Ministikwan 161A is an Indian reserve of the Ministikwan Lake Cree Nation in Saskatchewan. It is 117 kilometres (73 mi) north-west of North Battleford. In the 2016 Canadian Census, it recorded a population of 223 living in 40 of its 42 total private dwellings. In the same year, its Community Well-Being index was calculated at 35 of 100, compared to 58.4 for the average First Nations community and 77.5 for the average non-Indigenous community.

== See also ==
- List of Indian reserves in Saskatchewan
- Ministikwan 161
