= Rural Municipality of Frenchman Butte No. 501 =

Rural municipality in Saskatchewan, Canada

Frenchman Butte No. 501
- Rural municipality
- Rural Municipality of Frenchman Butte No. 501

- Location of the RM of Frenchman Butte No. 501 in Saskatchewan
- Coordinates: 53.628°N 109.446°W
- Country: Canada
- Province: Saskatchewan
- Census division: 17
- SARM division: 6
- Formed: January 1, 1954

Government
  - Reeve: Barbara Bonnie Mills-Midgley
  - Governing body: RM of Frenchman Butte No. 501 Council
  - Administrator: Mae Rotsey
  - Office location: Paradise Hill

Area (2016)
  - Land: 1,927.39 km^{2} (744.17 sq mi)

Population (2016)
  - Total: 1,494
  - Density: 0.8/km^{2} (2.1/sq mi)
- Time zone: CST
  - Summer (DST): CST
- Area codes: 306 and 639

The Rural Municipality of Frenchman Butte No. 501 (2016 population: 1,494) is a rural municipality (RM) in the Canadian province of Saskatchewan within Census Division No. 17 and SARM Division No. 6.

== History ==
The RM of Frenchman Butte No. 501 was incorporated as a rural municipality on January 1, 1954. It was formed through the amalgamation of the RMs of Paradise Hill No. 501 and North Star No. 531 on December 31, 1953.

== Geography ==
=== Communities and localities ===
The following urban municipalities are surrounded by the RM.

Towns

- St. Walburg

Villages

- Paradise Hill

The following unincorporated communities are within the RM.

Organized hamlets

- Frenchman Butte

Localities

- Fort Pitt
- Harlan
- Onion Lake

The RM also surrounds Seekaskootch First Nation Indian Reserve No. 119 and borders Makaoo 120.

== Deer Creek Recreation Site ==
Deer Creek Recreation Site (53.5212°N 109.6197°W) is a provincial recreation park along the banks of the North Saskatchewan River. It is adjacent to Deer Creek Bridge, which carries Highway 3 across the river. The park is on both sides of the river with the north side being in the RM of Frenchman Butte and the southern side in the RM of Britannia. Deer Creek Recreation Site is 14 hectares (35 acres) in size, has access to the river for fishing and boating, and has a rustic campground.

== Demographics ==
Population history (1981–2016)
Year	Pop.	±%
1981	1,504	—
1986	1,537	+2.2%
1991	1,397	−9.1%
1996	1,331	−4.7%
2001	1,322	−0.7%
2006	1,223	−7.5%
2011	1,438	+17.6%
2016	1,494	+3.9%
Source: Statistics Canada via Saskatchewan Bureau of Statistics

In the 2021 Census of Population conducted by Statistics Canada, the RM of Frenchman Butte No. 501 had a population of 1,250 living in 406 of its 503 total private dwellings, a change of −16.3% from its 2016 population of 1,494. With a land area of 1,902.15 km^{2} (734.42 sq mi), it had a population density of 0.7/km^{2} (1.7/sq mi) in 2021.

In the 2016 Census of Population, the RM of Frenchman Butte No. 501 recorded a population of 1,494 living in 455 of its 544 total private dwellings, a 3.9% change from its 2011 population of 1,438. With a land area of 1,927.39 km^{2} (744.17 sq mi), it had a population density of 0.8/km^{2} (2.0/sq mi) in 2016.

== Government ==
The RM of Frenchman Butte No. 501 is governed by an elected municipal council and an appointed administrator that meets on the second Thursday of every month. The reeve of the RM is Barbara Bonnie Mills-Midgley while its administrator is Mae Rotsey. The RM's office is located in Paradise Hill.

== Transportation ==
Rail

- North Battleford - Turtleford Branch C.N.R—serves North Battleford, Hamlin, Prince, Meota, Vawn, Edam, Longstaff, Mervin, Turtleford, Cleeves, Spruce Lake, St. Walburg

Roads

- Highway 797 — serves Fort Pitt and Onion Lake and Frenchman Butte
- Highway 21
- Highway 26 — intersects Highway 3
- Highway 795
- Highway 3 — serves Paradise Hill

== See also ==
- List of rural municipalities in Saskatchewan
