= Rat Creek =

Coordinates: 53.559245°N 113.459237°W

- Location of mouth in Alberta

Location
- Country: Canada
- Province: Alberta

Basin features
- River system: North Saskatchewan River

Rat Creek is a tributary to the North Saskatchewan River. Rat Creek was once part of a much larger system which formerly almost connected to the Sturgeon River. However, Rat Creek is now defined as a lost creek, due to the city of Edmonton's encroachment on the surrounding area for urban use. Rat Creek was fed by sloughs that occurred north of Edmonton.

== History ==
Rat Creek was once a large water system, which brought water downstream into the North Saskatchewan River. The creek's name refers to muskrats, rather than to any member of the genus Rattus, which were plentiful along the creek when the region was an active part of the North American fur trade.

Rat Creek lies on the northern side of Edmonton's river valley, and its original full route is comparable to the south side's Mill Creek and Whitemud Creek as one of the longest creeks in the city. A section of the North-West Mounted Police camped near Rat Creek on their way to establish themselves at Edmonton in 1874, moving to Fort Saskatchewan the following year. They complained that their horses and wagons were constantly mired in the thick mud and the many sloughs that were present in this area.

=== Rat Creek Rebellion ===
In 1892, a group of Edmonton citizens rose up to stop the transfer of the local land titles office to southside Old Strathcona. A NWMP contingent were rushed from Fort Saskatchewan to suppress the so-called "Rat Creek Rebellion." The mob stopped the force at the bridge crossing Rat Creek, hence the uprising's name. To settle the situation, the government backed down to the extent of maintaining the land titles office in Edmonton - but starting another one at the end-of-steel in Old Strathcona.

== Post-1904 Edmonton development ==
In the early years following Edmonton's 1904 incorporation as a city, Rat Creek was an area used extensively as a city dump, which filled part of the Kinnaird Ravine. Later, the city decided to fill the creek in and pave it over, gaining more land for development and avoiding the cost of building bridges over it. This affected the creek greatly as it had no longer a way of flowing - progressively draining in the last hundred years, leading to the lost creek designation.

The original route of Rat Creek was in the present neighbourhood of Norwood. The lower reaches of Rat Creek are still visible in Kinnaird Ravine, and it is now fed by storm drain culverts.

=== Possible city restoration efforts ===
Rat Creek is a place of interest for many environmentalists, who believe in preserving the natural habitat that the creek provides and re-introducing a natural flow to the creek. Since 1975, the City of Edmonton has developed an extensive North Saskatchewan River valley parks system, which includes stretches up creeks and ravines branching away from the main valley. Over the course of 2016 and 2017, its Planning Department has worked with the community to develop the "Dawson Park & Kinnaird Ravine Master Plan", which reached its penultimate Phase 4 in November 2017. The Phase 4 plan includes restoration and expansion of the creek's native flora, as well as restoration of the natural flow of the lower portion of Rat Creek, from a point near the light rail transit's Stadium Station through to its connection with the North Saskatchewan River. As of November 2018, the Design and Build Phases have not yet been funded, and the city's Open Space Planning and Design branch has taken the plan to Edmonton City Council for consideration in the 2019-2022 budget cycle.
