= Paradise Hill, Saskatchewan =

Village in Saskatchewan, Canada

Paradise Hill
- Village
- Location within Saskatchewan Location within Canada
- Coordinates: 53.532°N 109.451°W
- Country: Canada
- Province: Saskatchewan
- Census division: 17
- Rural municipality: Frenchman Butte No. 501

Government
  - Mayor: Bernard Ecker
  - Administrator: Cindy Villeneuve
  - Governing body: Paradise Hill Village Council

Area
  - Total: 2.56 km^{2} (0.99 sq mi)

Population (2016)
  - Total: 495
  - Density: 201.1/km^{2} (521/sq mi)
- Time zone: CST
- Postal code: S0M 2G0
- Area code: 306
- Highway(s): Highway 3
- Website: Official Website

Paradise Hill (2016 population: 491) is a village in the Canadian province of Saskatchewan within the Rural Municipality of Frenchman Butte No. 501 and Census Division No. 17.

Oil, natural gas, and farming are the primary providers for the economy.

== History ==
Paradise Hill incorporated as a village on January 1, 1947.

== Demographics ==
Population history (1981–2021)
Year	Pop.	±%
1981	421	—
1986	494	+17.3%
1991	455	−7.9%
1996	466	+2.4%
2001	486	+4.3%
2006	483	−0.6%
2011	515	+6.6%
2016	491	−4.7%
2021	471	−4.1%
Source: Statistics Canada via Saskatchewan Bureau of Statistics

In the 2021 Census of Population conducted by Statistics Canada, Paradise Hill had a population of 471 living in 197 of its 231 total private dwellings, a change of −4.1% from its 2016 population of 491. With a land area of 2.28 km^{2} (0.88 sq mi), it had a population density of 206.6/km^{2} (535.0/sq mi) in 2021.

In the 2016 Census of Population, the Village of Paradise Hill recorded a population of 491 living in 204 of its 239 total private dwellings, a −4.9% change from its 2011 population of 515. With a land area of 2.56 km^{2} (0.99 sq mi), it had a population density of 191.8/km^{2} (496.8/sq mi) in 2016.

== Attractions ==
- The Roman Catholic church of Our Lady of Sorrows in Paradise Hill was decorated by the artist Berthold Imhoff.
- A giant ox and cart is at the entrance of the village commemorates the Carlton Trail.
- The Marsh is north and west of the village with its walkways, paths and lookout offers bird watching opportunities.
- The Frenchman Butte Museum, the Battle of Frenchman Butte National Historic Site, and Fort Pitt Provincial Park are all located within 15 to 30 minute driving distance.

== Notable people ==
- John Rogers, played NHL for the Minnesota North Stars and in the WHA for the Edmonton Oilers
- Tanner Novlan (born 9 April 1986) is an actor and model.

== See also ==
- List of communities in Saskatchewan
- List of villages in Saskatchewan
- Paradise Hill Airport
