= Ministikwan Lake Cree Nation =

Native Canadian first nation

Ministikwan Lake Cree Nation (Cree: ᒥᓂᐢᑎᑿᐣ, ministikwan), also known as Island Lake First Nation, is a Cree First Nation in Saskatchewan, Canada. Their reserves include Ministikwan 161 and Ministikwan 161A.

In September 2024, they became signatories to the Buffalo Treaty.

== See also ==
- List of Indian reserves in Saskatchewan
