= Onion Lake Cree Nation =

Plains Cree First Nations band government in Canada

- Band No. 344
- ᐑᐦᒉᑲᐢᑯᓰᐏᓵᑲᐦᐃᑲᓂᕽ wîhcêkaskosîwi-sâkahikanihk
- People: Cree
- Treaty: Treaty 6
- Headquarters: Onion Lake
- Province: Saskatchewan

Land
- Other reserves: Seekaskootch 119; Onion Lake 119-1; Onion Lake 119-2; Makaoo 120
- Land area: 585.711 km^{2} (226.144 sq mi)

Population (2019)
- On reserve: 3954
- On other land: 1
- Off reserve: 2520
- Total population: 6475

Government
- Chief: Darwin Peter Chief

Website
- onionlake.ca

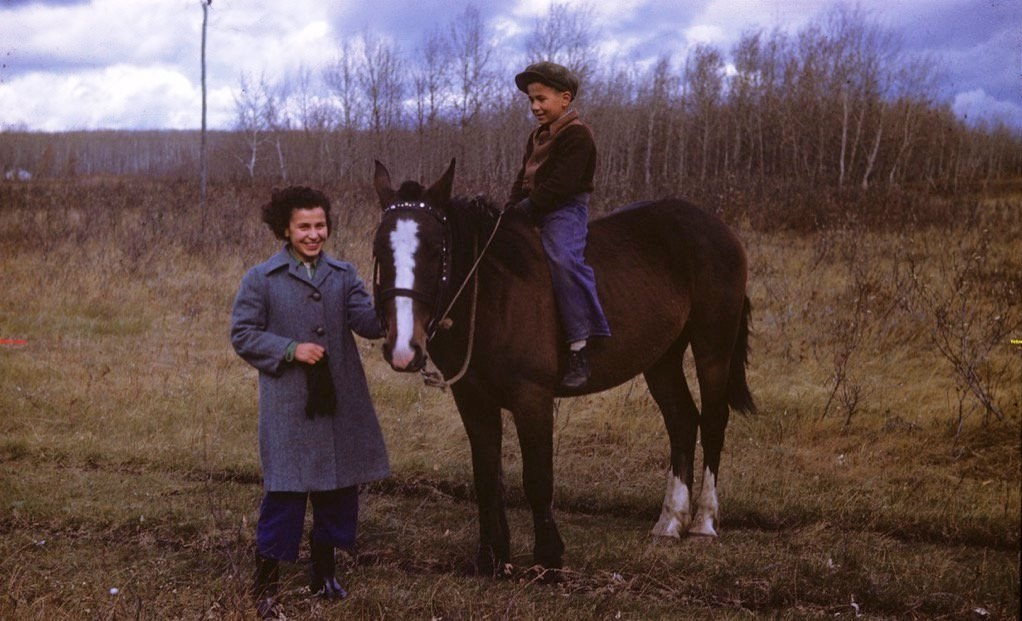
Two members of Onion Lake Cree Nation in 1946

The Onion Lake Cree Nation (Cree: ᐑᐦᒉᑲᐢᑯᓰᐏᓵᑲᐦᐃᑲᓂᕽ, wîhcêkaskosîwi-sâkahikanihk) is a Plains Cree First Nations band government in Canada, straddling the Alberta/Saskatchewan provincial border approximately 50 km (31 mi) north of the City of Lloydminster.

It is within Alberta's County of Vermilion River and Saskatchewan's Rural Municipality of Frenchman Butte No. 501 at the intersection of Highway 17 and Alberta Highway 641/Saskatchewan Highway 797.

The Makaoo 120 reserve is located within both provinces while the Seekaskootch 119 reserve is wholly within Saskatchewan. Both reserves once maintained separate band governments, combining to form Onion Lake in 1914. With all reserves combined, the Onion Lake Cree Nation has a total land area of 585.711 square kilometres (226.144 sq mi), and has 6,475 registered members (as of August 2019).

The Onion Lake Cree Nation has five schools within the community: Sakāskohc High School, Eagleview Middle School, Chief Taylor Elementary School, Pewasenakwan Primary School, and Kihēw Waciston Cree Immersion School. A widely seen First World War propaganda poster shows Moo-Che-We-In-Es of the Onion Lake Cree Nation making a $1.50 donation to the Canadian Patriotic Fund with a cover letter in Western Cree syllabics.

== Etymology ==
Onion Lake is a translation of Wicekikaskosîwi-sâkahikan, "Wild Onion" smelly plant, a nearby body of water where the plant was abundant. When referring to the community today, though, Cree speakers typically use wîhcekaskosîwi-sâkahikanihk, "[domestic] onion lake".

== Onion Lake, Saskatchewan ==
The unincorporated area of Onion Lake is located within the Saskatchewan portion of the Onion Lake Cree Nation at the intersection of Highway 17 and Alberta Highway 641/Saskatchewan Highway 797.
