= Seekaskootch 119 =

Indian reserve in Saskatchewan, Canada

Coordinates: 53°42′03″N 109°53′25″W

- Indian reserve
- Seekaskootch Indian Reserve No. 119
- Location in Saskatchewan
- First Nation: Onion Lake
- Country: Canada
- Province: Saskatchewan

Area
  - Total: 15,492.2 ha (38,282 acres)

Population (2016)
  - Total: 2,574
  - Density: 16.61/km^{2} (43.03/sq mi)
- Community Well-Being Index: 53

Seekaskootch 119 is an Indian reserve of the Onion Lake Cree Nation in Saskatchewan. It is about 142 kilometres (88 mi) north-west of North Battleford. In the 2016 Canadian Census, it recorded a population of 2574 living in 578 of its 639 total private dwellings. In the same year, its Community Well-Being index was calculated at 53 of 100, compared to 58.4 for the average First Nations community and 77.5 for the average non-Indigenous community.

== See also ==
- List of Indian reserves in Saskatchewan
