= Little Fishing Lake, Saskatchewan =

Community in Saskatchewan, Canada

Coordinates: 53°51′34″N 109°33′50″W

Little Fishing Lake is a hamlet in the Canadian province of Saskatchewan on Little Fishing Lake in the Bronson Lake Provincial Recreation Site. It is a popular summer resort as there is a beach with a swimming area and fishing opportunities for northern pike and walleye. A rustic campground, convenience store, and a subdivision are developed around the lake. Access to the community and the lake is from Highway 21.

== Demographics ==
In the 2021 Census of Population conducted by Statistics Canada, Little Fishing Lake had a population of 45 living in 26 of its 94 total private dwellings, a change of 125% from its 2016 population of 20. With a land area of 0.26 km^{2} (0.10 sq mi), it had a population density of 173.1/km^{2} (448.3/sq mi) in 2021.

== See also ==
- List of communities in Saskatchewan
