= North Saskatchewan River =

River in Western Canada

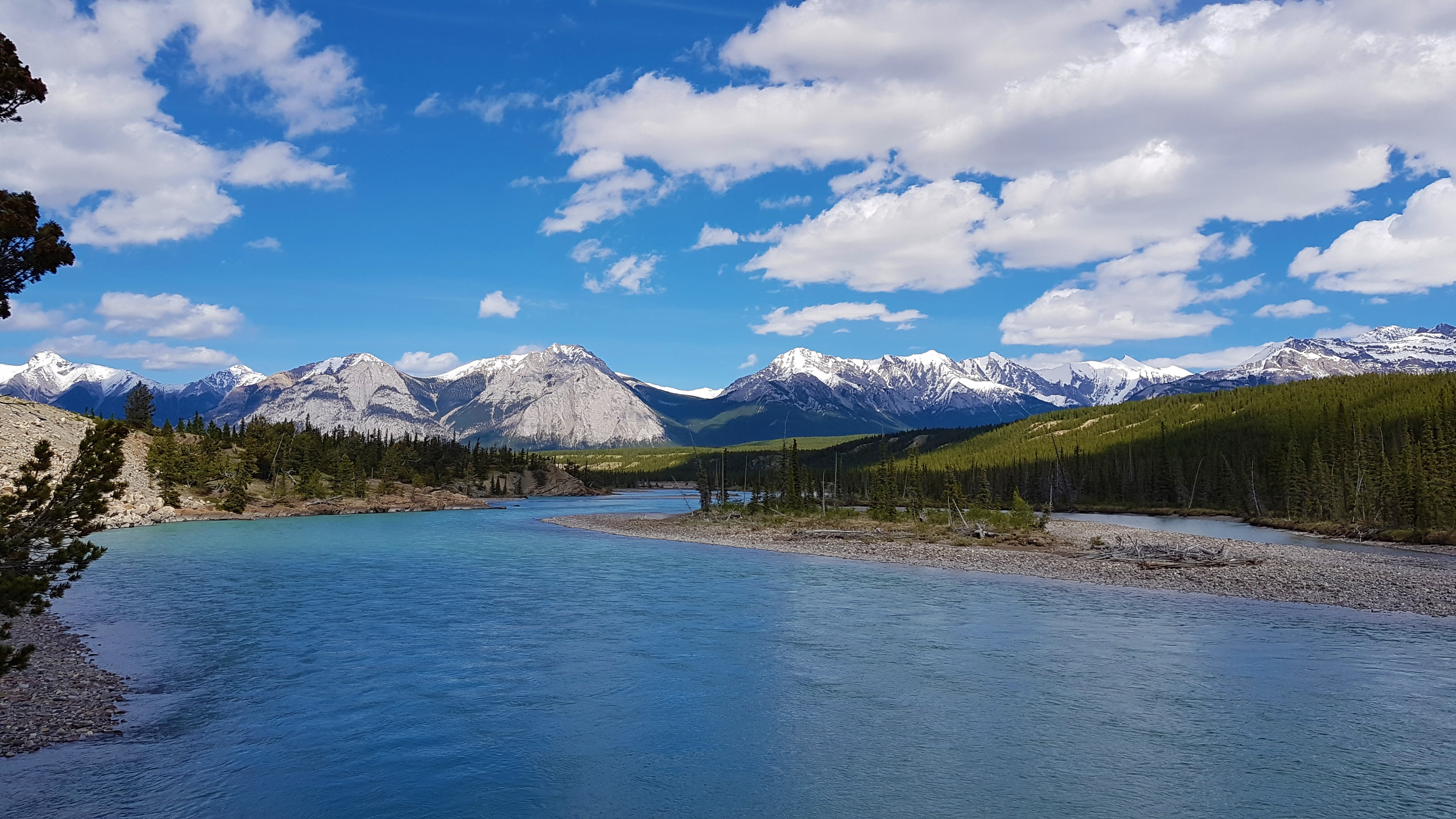
- North Saskatchewan River near Abraham Lake

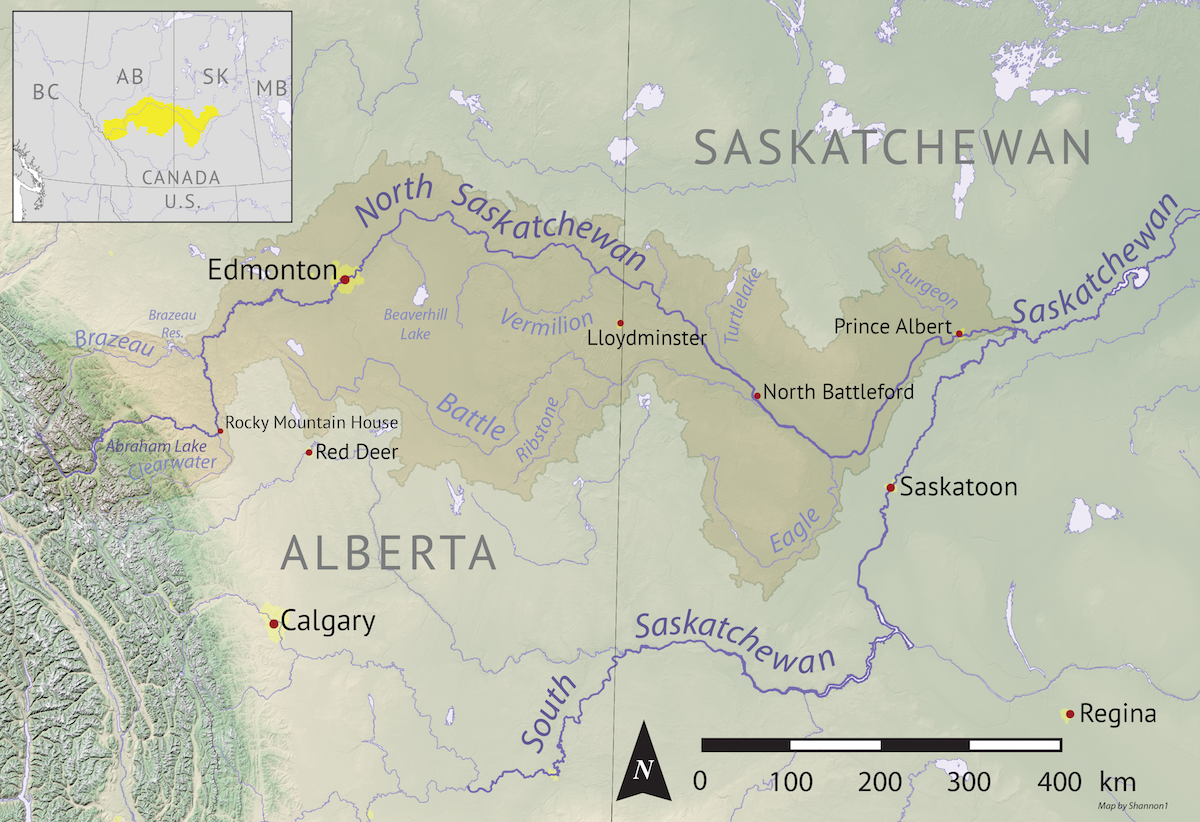
- The North Saskatchewan River drainage basin

- River's mouth in Saskatchewan North Saskatchewan River (Canada)
- Etymology: Plains Cree: 'fast current / swift-flowing river'; Blackfoot: 'big river'

Location
- Country: Canada
- Provinces: Alberta; Saskatchewan
- Cities: Edmonton, AB; North Battleford, SK; Prince Albert, SK

Physical characteristics
- Source: Rocky Mountains
  - location: Saskatchewan Glacier, Alberta
  - coordinates: 52°09′22″N 117°10′54″W
  - elevation: 2,080 m (6,820 ft)
- Mouth: Saskatchewan River
  - location: Saskatchewan River Forks, Saskatchewan
  - coordinates: 53°14′07″N 105°04′58″W
  - elevation: 380 m (1,250 ft)
- Length: 1,287 km (800 mi)
- Basin size: 122,800 km^{2} (47,400 sq mi)
- Discharge
  - location: Prince Albert, Saskatchewan, 53 km (33 mi) from the mouth
  - average: 238 m^{3}/s (8,400 cu ft/s)
  - minimum: 19 m^{3}/s (670 cu ft/s)
  - maximum: 5,660 m^{3}/s (200,000 cu ft/s)

Basin features
- Progression: Saskatchewan River → Lake Winnipeg → Nelson River → Hudson Bay
- River system: Nelson River
- Tributaries
  - left: Brazeau River
  - right: Clearwater River; Vermilion River; Battle River

The North Saskatchewan River is a glacier-fed river that flows from the Canadian Rockies continental divide east to central Saskatchewan, where it joins with the South Saskatchewan River to make up the Saskatchewan River. Its water flows into the Hudson Bay via Lake Winnipeg and the Nelson River.

The Saskatchewan River system is the largest shared between the Canadian provinces of Alberta and Saskatchewan. Its watershed includes most of southern and central Alberta and Saskatchewan.

== Course ==
The North Saskatchewan River has a length of 1,287 kilometres (800 mi), and a drainage area of 122,800 square kilometres (47,400 mi^{2}). At its end point at Saskatchewan River Forks it has a mean discharge of 245 cubic metres per second (8,700 cu ft/s). The yearly discharge at the Alberta–Saskatchewan border is more than 7 cubic kilometres (1.7 mi^{3}).

The river begins above 1,800 metres (5,900 ft) at the toe of the Saskatchewan Glacier in the Columbia Icefield, and flows southeast through Banff National Park alongside the Icefields Parkway. At the junction of the David Thompson Highway (Highway 11), it initially turns northeast for ten kilometres (6.2 mi) before switching to a more direct eastern flow for about 30 kilometres (19 mi). At this point, it turns north where it eventually arrives at Abraham Lake. Bighorn Dam constricts the north end of Abraham Lake, where the North Saskatchewan emerges to track eastward to Rocky Mountain House. At Rocky Mountain House, the river abruptly turns north again for 100 kilometres (62 mi) where it switches east towards Edmonton, Alberta.

In Edmonton, the river passes through the centre of the city in a northeasterly direction and out towards Smoky Lake at which point it quickly changes to the southeast and then more to the east as it makes its way to the Alberta–Saskatchewan boundary.

From the border, the river flows southeast between North Battleford and Battleford and on in the direction of Saskatoon. About 40 kilometres (25 mi) northwest of Saskatoon, near Langham, the river veers to the northeast where it passes through the City of Prince Albert. About 30 kilometres (19 mi) downstream of Prince Albert, the North Saskatchewan River joins the South Saskatchewan River at Saskatchewan River Forks to become the Saskatchewan River. From there, the river flows east to Tobin Lake and into Manitoba, eventually emptying into Lake Winnipeg.

== Geography ==
The river course can be divided into five distinct sections. The first, the eastern slopes of the Rocky Mountains, is the smallest area geographically, although the largest in terms of run-off and contributed water flow. The glaciers and perpetual snows of the mountain peaks feed the river year-round. Mountains, with little vegetation, experience fast-melting snow cover. The second section of the river comprises the foothills region. The terrain is hilly and rough, with a deeper and more defined valley. This area is well covered with forest and muskeg, and run-off into the river is much more constant and stable than in the mountains.

From Edmonton to the mouth of the Vermilion River, the North Saskatchewan flows through the plains-parkland divide, with occasional stretches of prairie. The North Saskatchewan River valley parks system is the largest expanses of urban parkland in Canada. Cutting across Edmonton and the Capital Region. The river runs in a well-defined valley with deep cuts in the landscape. The fourth section, from the Vermilion River to Prince Albert is principally prairie with a few small stretches of timber and secondary forest cover. The valley of the river is much wider, and the river itself spreads out across shallow water and flows over many shifting sand bars. Low-lying, flat areas border the river for much of this section.

The final section of the river, from Prince Albert to the Saskatchewan River Forks, has many rapids. The valley is more shallow than the previous sections of the river, and the channel is much better defined. There is little prairie and much tree cover in this section.

The water flows into the Saskatchewan River.

== Geology ==
The Bridge River Ash is in the vicinity of the North Saskatchewan River, which erupted from the Mount Meager massif in southwestern British Columbia about 2,350 years ago.

Over the past 12,000 years following the retreat of continental glaciers, the North Saskatchewan river carved down through soft glacial sediments and into harder Cretaceous sedimentary rocks – including the Horseshoe Canyon Formation – creating four major terrace levels along its valley.

== History ==
The river is shown on a Hudson's Bay Company (HBC) map from 1760, labelled as the Beaver River.

Its Cree name is kisiskâciwanisîpiy, meaning 'swift current'. From this name is derived the name Saskatchewan, used as well for the South Saskatchewan River and the Saskatchewan River (of which both the North and South Saskatchewan rivers are major tributaries), and the province of that name.

Its Blackfoot name is omaka-ty 'big river'.

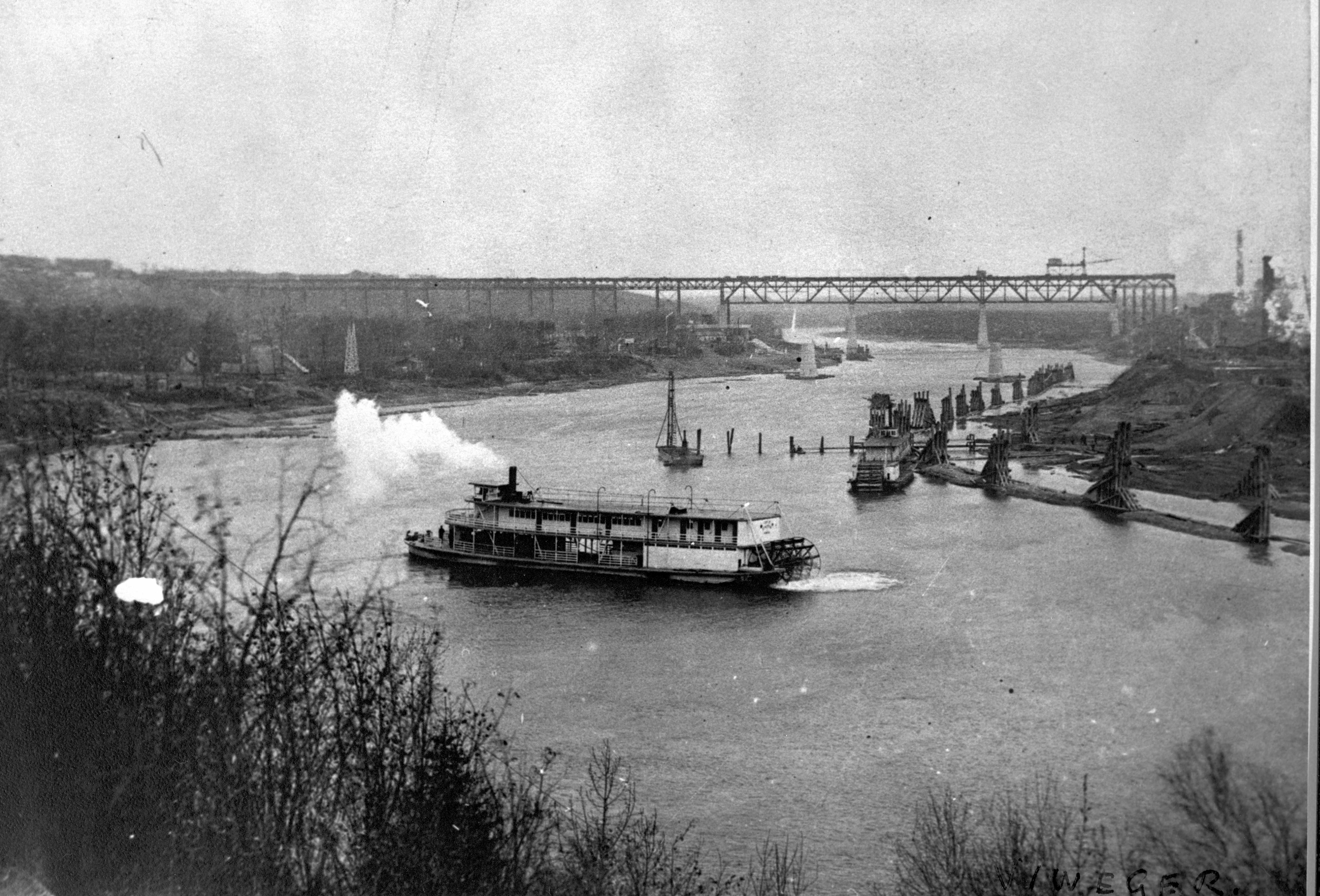
The North Saskatchewan in Edmonton circa 1913. Steamboats in the foreground, construction of the High Level Bridge in the background, and mid-river piers for future Walterdale Bridge between.

The 49-kilometre section of the North Saskatchewan River that falls within the boundaries of Banff National Park was designated a Canadian Heritage River in 1989, due to its importance in the development of Western Canada. In 2022, the remaining 718 km within Alberta, flowing through 16 municipalities in the province, was nominated to the Canadian Heritage Rivers System, achieving final designation in March of 2024.

The river demarcates the prairie–parkland divide for much of its course and acted as a natural boundary between plains Blackfoot of the south and woodland Cree of the north for thousands of years. Archaeologists have found evidence and indications of nearly 800 permanent or temporary occupation and quarry sites in the Edmonton region alone, dating back hundreds and sometimes thousands of years. With the westward expansion of the fur trade spearheaded by the North West Company (NWC) and followed by the HBC, the river became an important transportation route for fur trade brigades' York boats, to which it was especially well suited as it follows an eastern trend toward Hudson Bay, the entry point for the HBC into the continent. Many fur trade posts were constructed on the river, including Fort Edmonton (1795) and Rocky Mountain House, the uppermost post reached by canoe navigation. The river's importance continued after the amalgamation of the HBC and the NWC. The river was plied by a number of steamboats up to the First World War, although for everyday freight the growing web of railway lines in the western prairies eventually replaced them. The river was used commercially for many years – to carry flatboats of settlers goods and construction materials downstream from Edmonton, to float thousands of logs in the annual log drive downstream to Edmonton prior to the First World War, as a source of ice blocks for home owners' iceboxes.

The first bridge across the river opened in 1900, the Low Level Bridge (Edmonton). The Canadian Northern Railway Bridge (Prince Albert) (1907-09), which also at first carried foot and wheeled traffic, and the Battleford Bridge (c. 1908) followed. Recent rehabilitation of the Battleford Truss Bridge restored this heritage structure in terms of safety and structural integrity, while improving access to Finlayson Island by both vehicles and pedestrians.

== Recreation ==
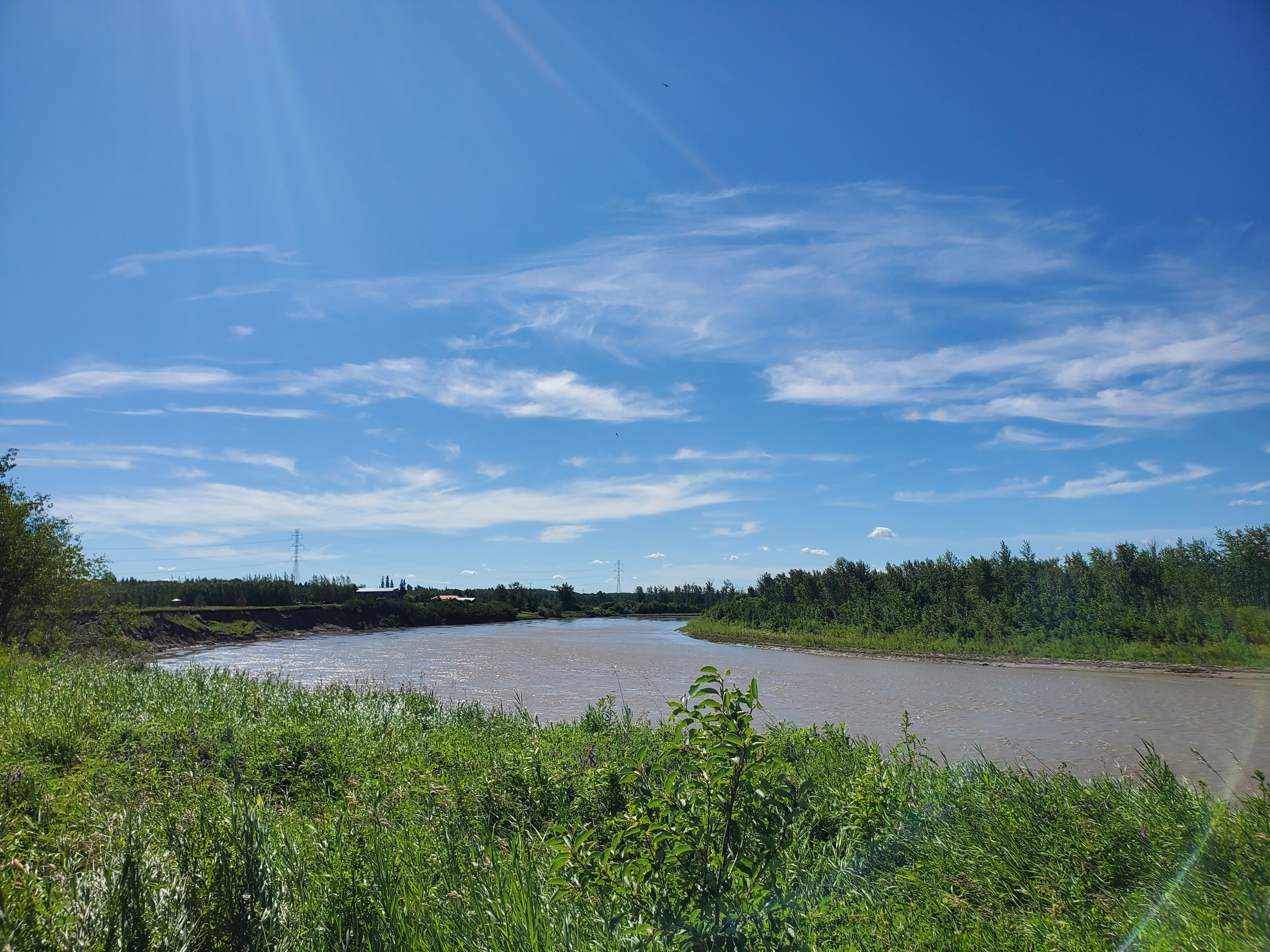
The North Saskatchewan River flowing past the West River's Edge park in Fort Saskatchewan, Alberta

Edmonton's North Saskatchewan River valley parks system is the largest system of urban parks in Canada, and covers both sides of the river valley's course through Edmonton. The River Valley Alliance, a non-profit organization composed of seven municipalities which border the North Saskatchewan River, is currently working to create a continuous trail network from the town of Devon to the city of Fort Saskatchewan – a total of 100 kilometres (62 mi).

== Fish species ==
Fish species include: walleye, sauger, yellow perch, northern pike, goldeye, mooneye, lake sturgeon, mountain whitefish, burbot, longnose sucker, white sucker and shorthead redhorse. The upper North Saskatchewan River contains cutthroat trout (although not native), and bull trout

== Flooding ==
Like all rivers, the North Saskatchewan is subject to periodic flooding, beginning with rapid snowmelt in the mountains or prolonged periods of rain in the river basin. With the establishment of permanent communities along the river's course, and the rise of an administrative/government structure, records exist recording floods in the North Saskatchewan for the past century. The Bighorn Dam, constructed in the early 1970s near Nordegg, Alberta, and the Brazeau Dam, constructed in the mid-1960s, have not reduced flooding potential on the North Saskatchewan River (Alberta Environment 1981)

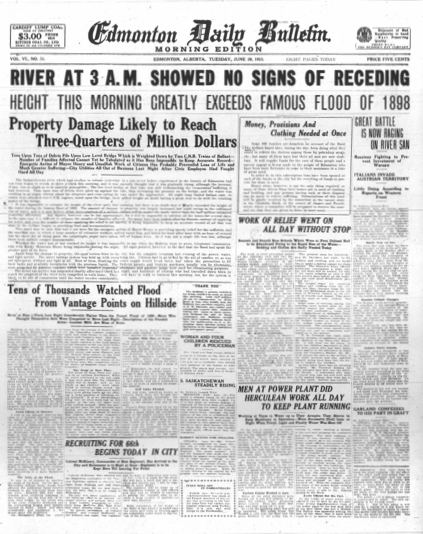
29 June 1915 cover of the Edmonton Daily Bulletin

=== List of notable flood years ===
Year	Edmonton		Prince Albert	
Year	Peak date	mean daily flow (m^{3}/s)	Peak date	Peak flow (m^{3}/s)
1899	18 August	4570	August	3960
1912	10 July	2100	14 July	1980
	19 August	1990	25 August	1550
1914	9 June	1750	14 June	1790
1915	29 June	4640	2 July	5300
	16 July	2550	21 July	2320
1917	18 May	1860	23 May	1540
1923	25 June	2380	30 June	1640
1925	18 August	2150	23 August	1620
1932	4 June	1870	10 June	2160
1944	16 June	3450	20 June	2940
1948	25 May	1850	31 May	2090
1952	25 June	3540	29 June	2970
1954	8 June	3030	12 June	2790
	27 August	2820	1 Sept	2570
1965	29 June	2590	4 July	2460
1969	7 July	1740	13 July	1570
1972	27 June	2970	2 July	2340
1974	–	–	23 April	3880
1980	7 June	1740	13 June	1680
1982	6 July	1920	13 July	1580
1986	19 July	3990	24 July	3230
1990	4 July	2340	10 July	1890
2005	21 June	2270	27 June	1800
2011	19 June	1800	26 June	2100
2013	23 June	2710	29 June	2200

=== Flood of 1899 ===
The river peaked at a stage of 12.61 metres (41.4 ft) with an estimated peak instantaneous discharge of 5,100 cubic metres per second (180,000 cu ft/s).

=== Flood of 1915 ===
The 1915 flood of the North Saskatchewan River was one of the most dramatic in the history of Edmonton. On 28 June, the Edmonton Bulletin reported the river had risen "10 feet in as many hours" and ultimately hitting a height of 42 feet over the low water level. A frantic phone call from Rocky Mountain House alerted local authorities to the flood's arrival. The Canadian Northern Railway had parked a number of train cars on the city's Low Level Bridge to protect against the "tons upon tons of debris" that had been pushed up against its piers, including a house swept away by the current. Thousands of Edmonton residents watched the flood destroy lumber mills, other industries and dozens of houses along the city's river valley.

The river peaked at a stage of 13.73 metres (45.0 ft), a rise of 11.5 metres (38 ft) above low flow, with an estimated peak instantaneous discharge of 5,800 cubic metres per second (200,000 cu ft/s). However, based on high water marks and 1D modelling, the actual value may have been closer to 6,300 cubic metres per second (220,000 cu ft/s).

=== Flood of 1986 ===
The river peaked at a stage of 11.5 metres (38 ft) with a peak instantaneous discharge of 4,520 cubic metres per second (160,000 cu ft/s).

=== 2013 Alberta flooding ===
Along with many other rivers in central and southern Alberta during late June, the North Saskatchewan saw significantly higher water levels and flow rates. The river peaked at a stage of 9.03 m (29.6 ft) with a peak instantaneous discharge of 2,710 cubic metres per second (96,000 cu ft/s) on June 23 in Edmonton. This is significantly higher than the Bow River's peak height at 4.1 metres (13 ft) and peak discharge of 1,750 cubic metres per second (62,000 cu ft/s) on June 21, that caused widespread flooding in Calgary. However, due to the expansive North Saskatchewan River Valley and natural sanctuary/parkland that surrounds it, the City of Edmonton had only minor, isolated flooding, with virtually no major property damage as a result.

== Commercial navigation ==
The North Saskatchewan River has always been a major trade route from Hudson Bay and central Canada across the Canadian Prairies to the Canadian Rockies. During the fur trade era, birch bark canoes and York boats travelled up and down the Saskatchewan delivering trade goods and amassing furs for transportation to Europe.

The North Saskatchewan also witnessed a lively, although short-lived, era of steamboat shipping during the 1870s, 1880s, and 1890s. The Hudson's Bay Company (HBC) purchased a number of steamboats from companies operating on the Red River and trading at Winnipeg/Fort Garry. The HBC desired to avoid paying the labour costs of fur trade brigades, and hoped steamboat shipping would provide a suitable alternative. Several HBC steamboats navigated the river intermittently for many years, although fluctuating water levels and natural barriers (rapids and sandbars) hampered efficient operation.

With the arrival of the railroad in Western Canada, steamboat shipping on the North Saskatchewan tapered off, but steamboats operated in the Edmonton area until the economic crash of 1912-14.

== Dams and hydroelectric development ==
A number of dams have been planned and constructed on the North Saskatchewan River and its tributaries. No singular purpose has dominated dam planning in the basin, indeed, hydroelectric development, flood control, and water diversion schemes have all underpinned proposals to construct dams on the river.

=== Planned dams ===
The first hydroelectric development on the North Saskatchewan was planned in 1910 near the Town of Drayton Valley. Funding for the plan came from a British syndicate; design and construction were to be carried out by the Edmonton Hydro-Electric Power Scheme. The development was shelved after the outbreak of World War I.

The La Colle Falls hydroelectric project east of Prince Albert was a half-built failure. Construction began in the 1910s and was later abandoned. The city remained in debt from financing the project until 1960, and the site still attracts tourists today.

During the 1960s and 1970s, a major dam was planned on the North Saskatchewan near the Hamlet of Hairy Hill, Alberta, about 160 kilometres (100 mi) downstream from Edmonton. This dam was part of a larger interbasin water diversion conceived by the Alberta Government to transfer water from the Peace, Smoky, and Athabasca rivers to the Saskatchewan River Basin.

The planned dam had a maximum height of 65 metres (212 ft), with a crest length of 1.76 kilometres (5,760 ft), which would have created a reservoir capable of holding over 4.9 cubic kilometres (4,000,000 acre⋅ft) of water. The reservoir would have affected municipal water works in the City of Fort Saskatchewan, was likely to inundate part of the Saddle Lake Indian reserve, and would have flooded a number of oil and natural gas fields in the area. The plan was later shelved in light of economic and environmental concerns.

=== Constructed dams ===
The Bighorn Dam was constructed near Nordegg and created Abraham Lake, one of the largest reservoirs in Alberta. The dam was constructed in 1972 by Calgary Power. The Bighorn Plant has a generating capacity of 120 megawatts (MW), and has an available water supply that allows it to be the largest producer of hydroelectric electricity in Alberta, with an average of 408,000 megawatt hours (MW⋅h) each year.

One of the North Saskatchewan's major tributaries, the Brazeau River, houses the Brazeau Hydroelectric Plant. At 355 MW, the Brazeau Dam is Alberta's largest hydroelectric facility, and was built in 1965 by Calgary Power. Though having a higher peak generating capacity than the Bighorn Dam, the hydrology of the Brazeau means that its average annual electricity production is a slightly smaller 397,000 MW⋅h.

== Tributaries ==
Tributaries of the North Saskatchewan River:

Saskatchewan Glacier to Abraham Lake

- Nigel Creek
- Alexandra River
- Norman Creek
- Rampart Creek
- Arctomy's Creek
- Castleguard River
- Howse River
  - Glacier River
- Mistaya River
  - Peyto Lake
- Owen Creek
- Thompson Creek
- Corona Creek
- Spreading Creek
- Wildhorse Creek
- Loudon Creek
- Siffleur River
  - Escarpment River
- Two O'Clock Creek
- Bridge Creek
- Whiterabbit Creek

Abraham Lake to Rocky Mountain House

- Canyon Creek
- Cline River
  - Pinto Lake
- Whitegoat Creek
- BATUS Creek
- Hoodoo Creek
- Allstones Creek
- Mud Creek
- Tershishner Creek
- Crooked Creek
- Kidd Creek
- Bighorn River
- Black Canyon Creek
- South Creek
- Dutch Creek
- Jock Creek
- Gap Creek
- Deep Creek
- Shunda Creek
- Jack Fish Creek
- Camp Creek
- Lundine Creek
- Lewis Creek
- Rough Creek
- Ram River
  - North Ram River
- Cow Creek
  - Cow Lake
- Clearwater River

Rocky Mountain House to Edmonton

- Chicken Creek
- Little Beaver Creek
- Big Beaver Creek
- No Name Creek
- Baptiste River
- Brazeau River
  - Southesk River, Cardinal River, Blackstone River, Elk River, Nordegg River
- Sand Creek
- Wolf Creek
- Washout Creek
- Mishow Creek
- Bucklake Creek
  - Poplar Creek
    - Modeste Creek
- Tomahawk Creek
- Shoal Lakes Creek
- Wabamum Creek
  - Wabamum Lake
- Strawberry Creek
- Weed Creek
- Willow Creek
- Cutbank Creek
- Conjuring Creek
  - Wizard Lake
- Whitemud Creek
- Blackmud Creek
- Mill Creek Ravine

Edmonton to Alberta-Saskatchewan Border

- Rat Creek
- Oldman Creek
- Horsehills Creek
- Ross Creek
- Sturgeon River
  - Big Lake
- Redwater River
- Beaverhill Creek
- Waskatenau Creek
- Egg Creek
- Smoky Creek
- White Earth Creek
- Redclay Creek
- Cucumber Creek
- Saddlelake Creek
- Lake Eliza Creek
- Siler Creek
- Gideon Lake
- Death River
- Antimose Creek
- Telegraph Creek
- Moosehills Creek
  - Mooswa Creek
- Middle Creek
  - Borden Lake, Laurier Lake, Ross Lake, Whitney Lake
- Frog Creek
  - Alma Creek
- Vermilion River
- Chester Creek
- Two Hills Creek
- Cabin Lake
- Mosquito Creek
- Fulton Creek

Saskatchewan

- Pipestone Creek
- Oldman Creek
- Monnery River
- Muskeg Creek
- Whitesand Creek
- Englishman River
- Big Gulley Creek
- Birling Creek
- Turtlelake River
- Jackfish River
- Battle River
  - Cut Knife Creek
- Cooper Creek
- Baljennie Creek
- Eagle Creek
- Pakrowka Creek
- Shepherds Creek
  - Turtle Creek
- Cee Pee Creek
- Radouga Creek
- Steep Creek
- Miners Creek
- Sturgeon River
  - Shell River
- Spruce River
- Garden River

== Photo gallery ==
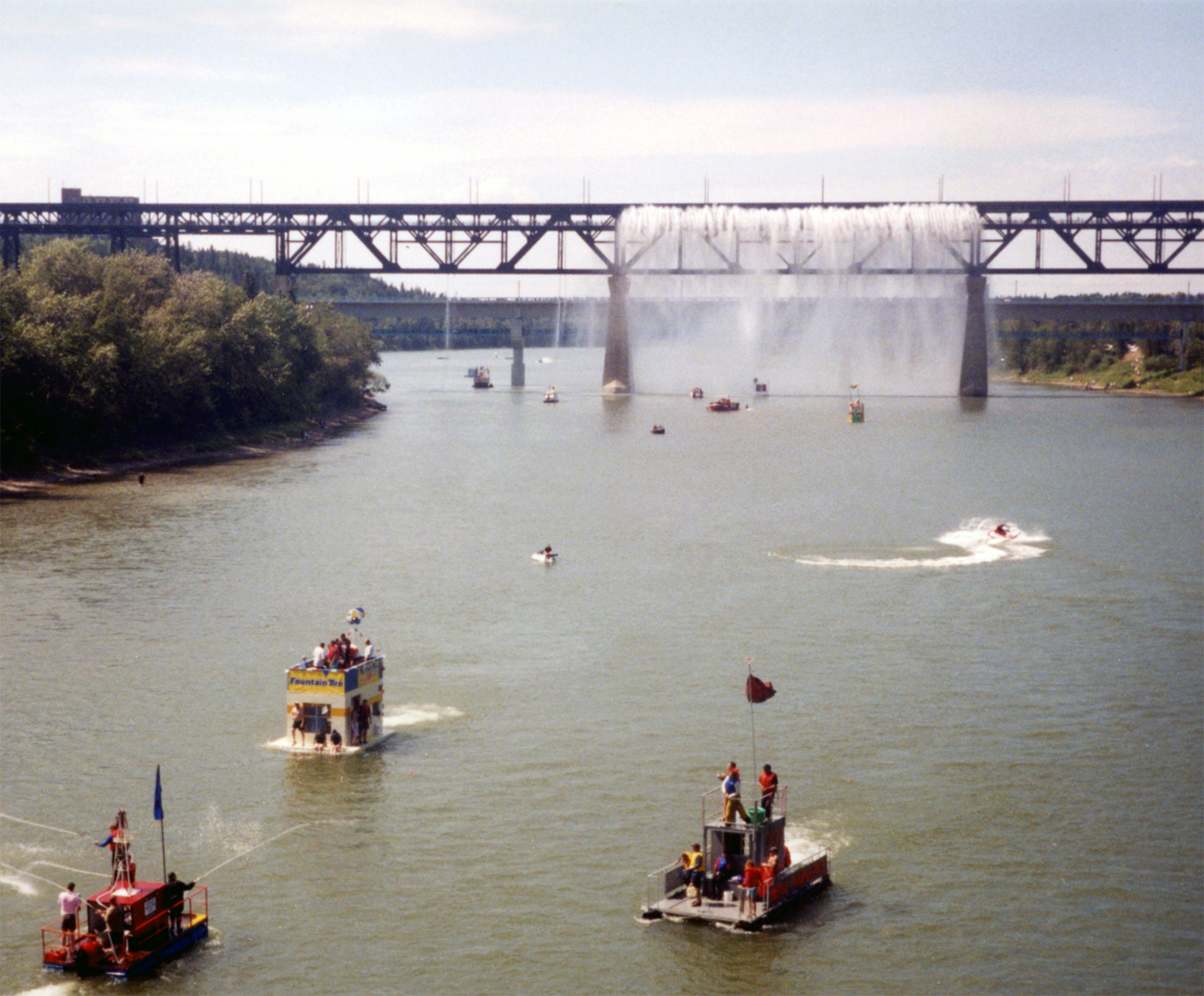
Boating in Edmonton, with a view of the High Level Bridge across the river

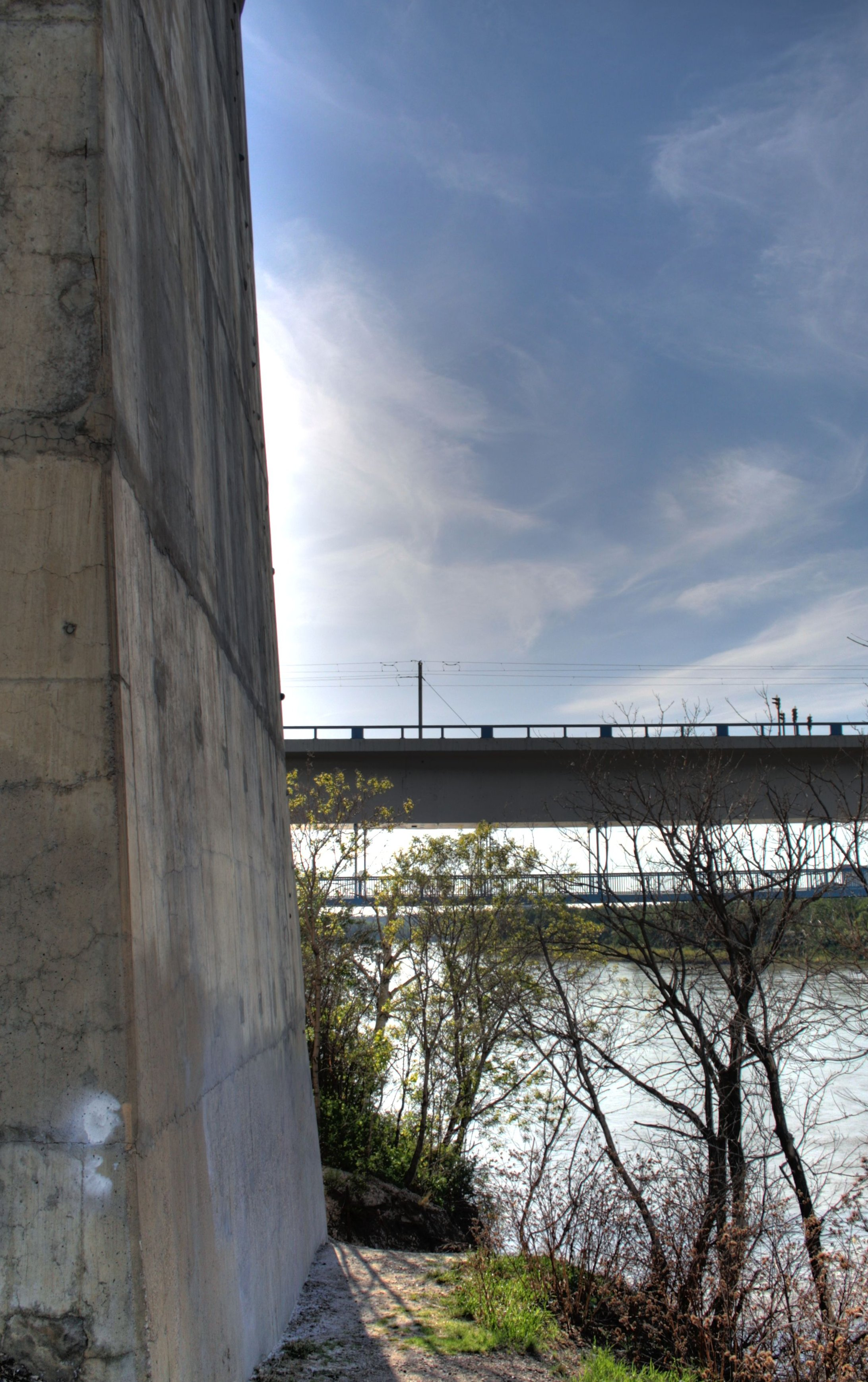
The Edmonton LRT bridge across the river in central Edmonton

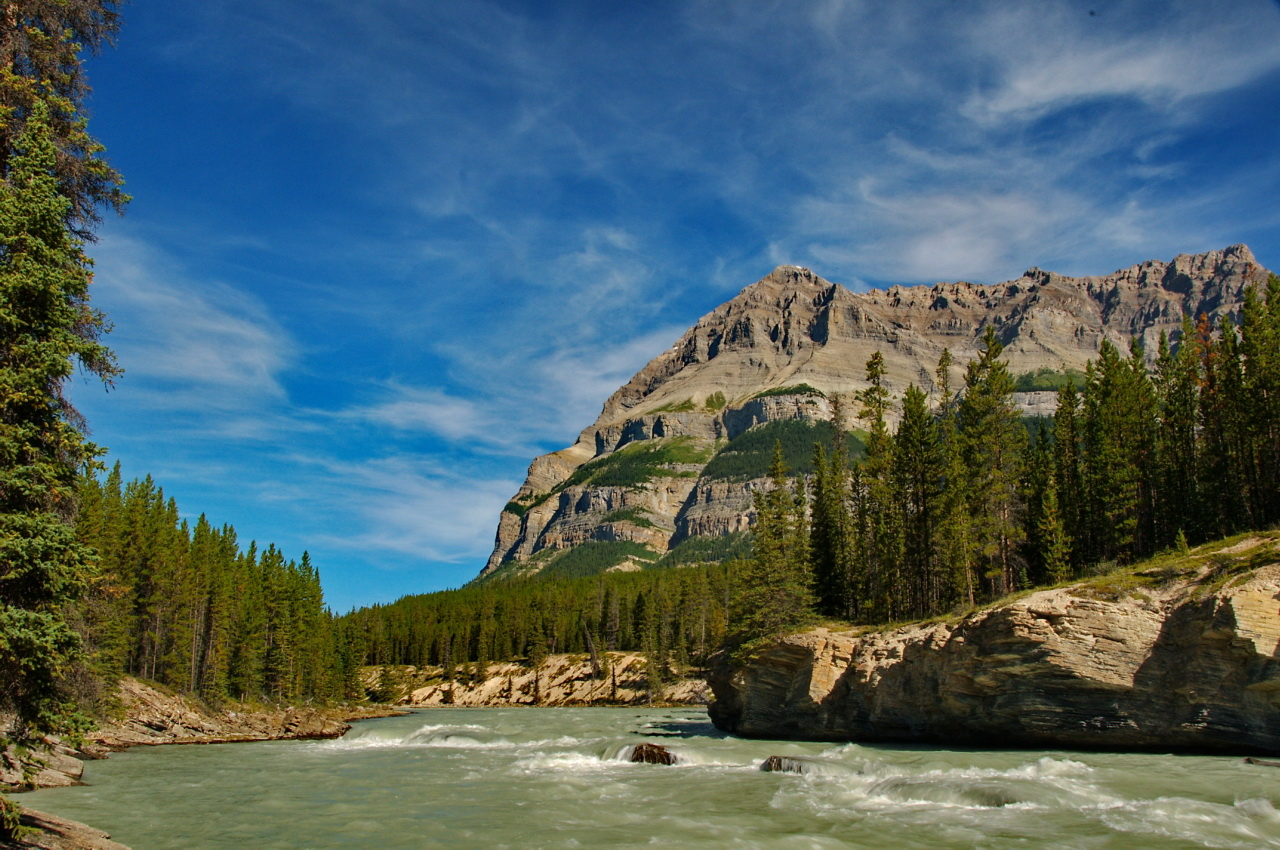
North Saskatchewan River with mountain peaks and the sky

Dudley B. Menzies Bridge (LRT and pedestrian bridge) over North Saskatchewan River in Edmonton

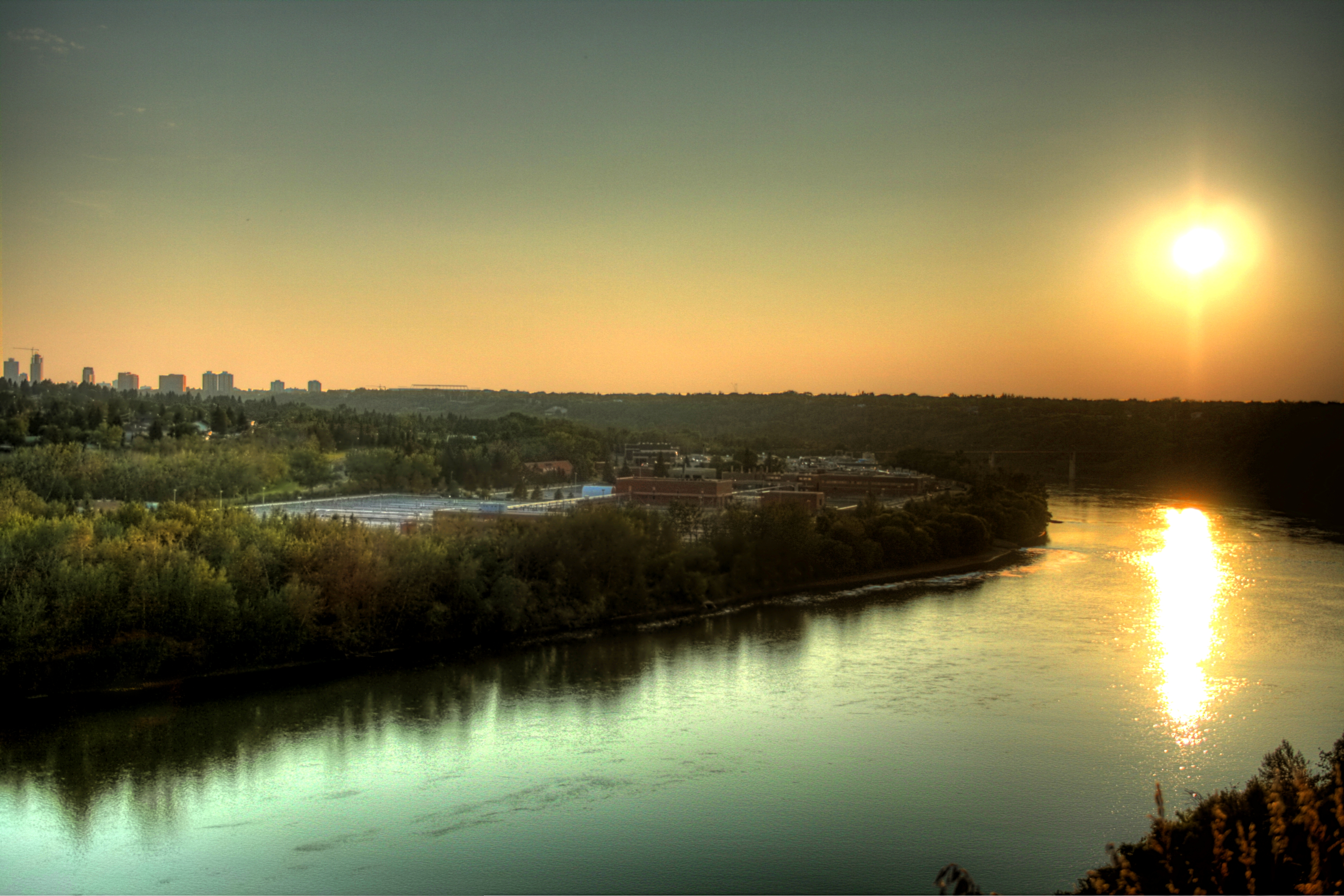
A view of the North Saskatchewan River Valley from the east end of Edmonton

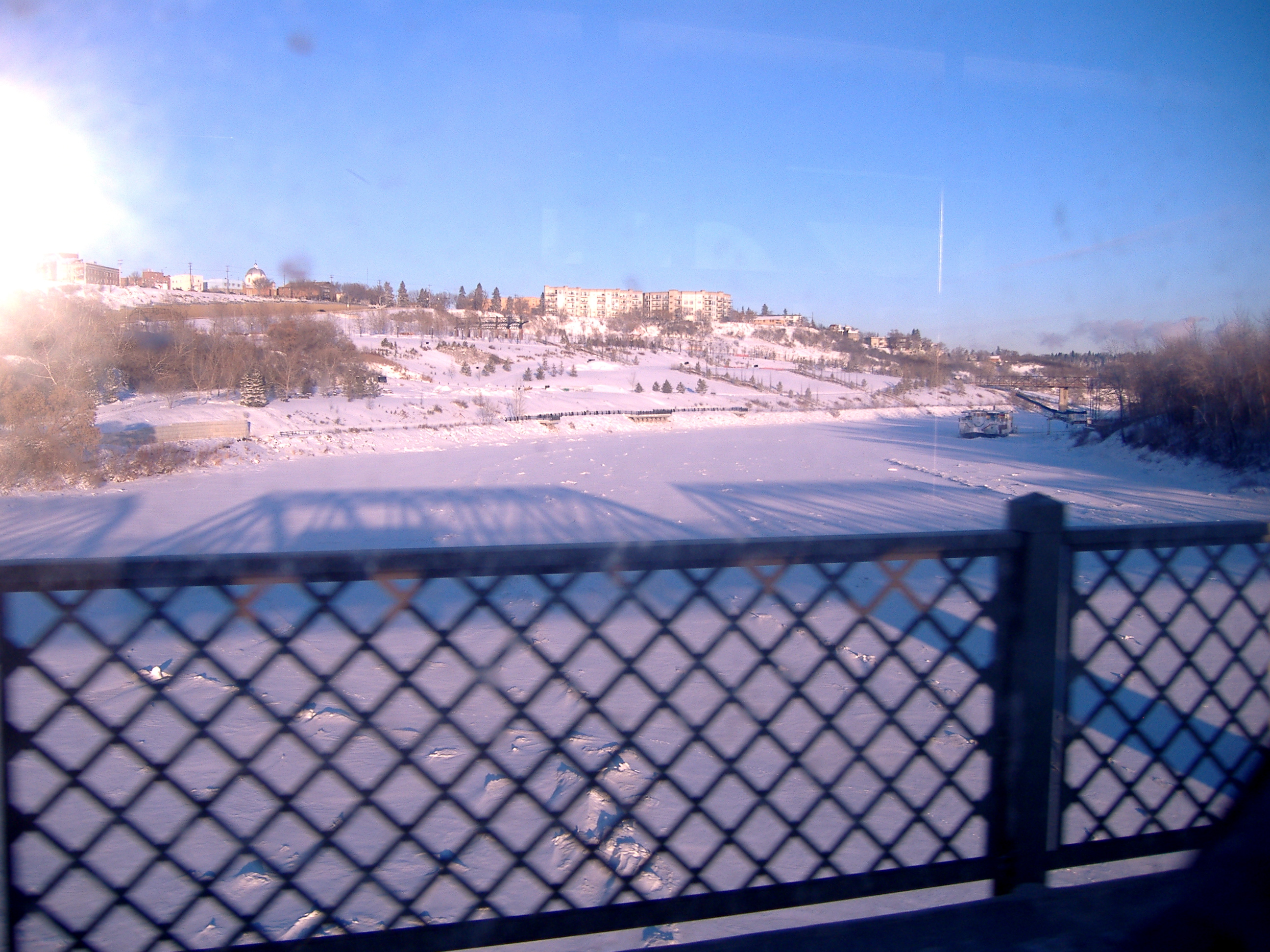
The river covered in a sheet of ice in Edmonton

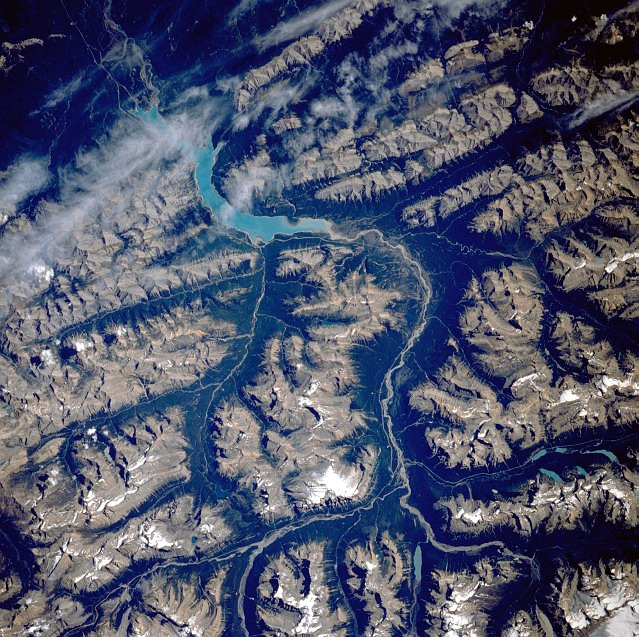
North Saskatchewan River and Abraham Lake from space

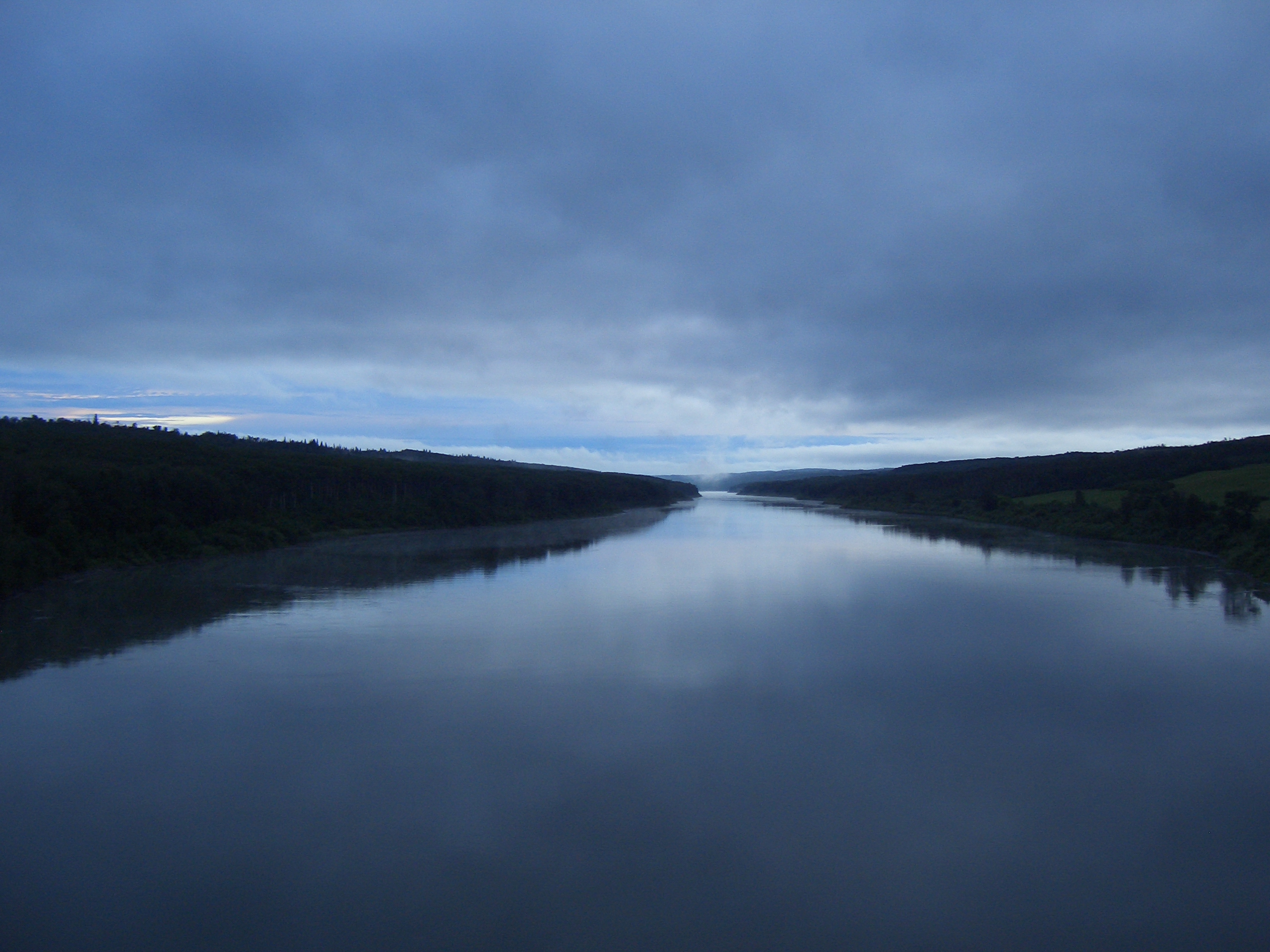
North Saskatchewan River near Myrnam, Alberta

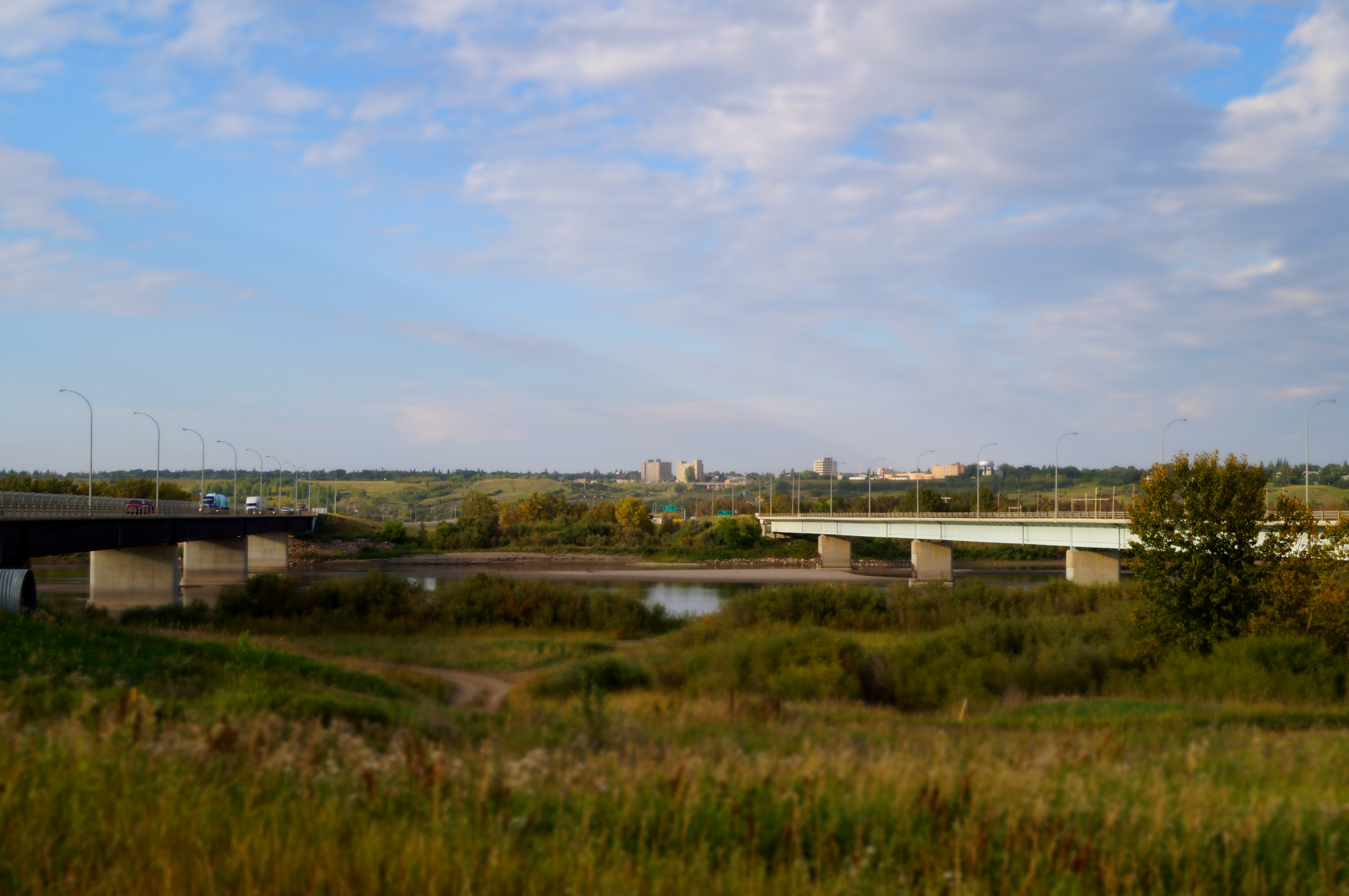
View of the City of North Battleford across the North Saskatchewan River

== See also ==
- List of crossings of the North Saskatchewan River
- List of longest rivers of Canada
- List of rivers of Alberta
- List of rivers of Saskatchewan
- Saskatchewan River fur trade
