= Ghost Town Trail (Saskatchewan) =

Stretch of highway in Saskatchewan, Canada

- Length: 675.3 miles (1,087 km)
- Location: Highway 13; Saskatchewan, Canada

Ghost Town Trail is a stretch of highway located in southern Saskatchewan, Canada. The trail coincides with Saskatchewan's Highway 13 between Govenlock and Wauchope. Along this highway are 32 "ghost towns".

== List of ghost towns ==
List of abandoned communities along Saskatchewan Highway 13
Community	Rural municipality	Peak population	Peak decade	Dissolved	Source
Altawan	Reno No. 51				
Govenlock	Reno No. 51	200	1920s	1976	
Senate	Reno No. 51	63	1940s	1994	
Vidora	Reno No. 51				
Robsart	Reno No. 51	350	1920s	2002	
Olga	White Valley No. 49				
Ravenscrag	White Valley No. 49	200	1920s		
Neighbour	White Valley No. 49				
South Fork	Arlington No. 79				
Instow	Bone Creek No. 108				
Scotsguard	Bone Creek No. 108	350	1920s	1953	
Crichton	Wise Creek No. 77				
Gouverneur	Auvergne No. 76	60	1920s		
Meyronne	Pinto Creek No. 75				
Melaval	Wood River No. 74				
Valor	Stonehenge No. 73				
Ardwick	Stonehenge No. 73				
Willows	Lake of the Rivers No. 72				
Readlyn	Lake of the Rivers No. 72				
Verwood	Excel No. 71				
Horizon	Bengough No. 40	200	1910s		
Glasnevin	Key West No. 70				
Wallace	Norton No. 69				
Amulet	Norton No. 69				
Khedive	Norton No. 69				
Forward	Norton No. 69	1,250	1910s	1947	
Axford	Brokenshell No. 68				
Trossachs	Brokenshell No. 68				
Hume	Griffin No. 66				
Griffin	Griffin No. 66				
Froude	Griffin No. 66				
Forget	Tecumseh No. 65				
Armilla	Brock No. 64				
Freemantle	Moose Mountain No. 63				
Wauchope	Antler No. 61				

== See also ==
- List of ghost towns in Saskatchewan
