= Vidora =

Community in Saskatchewan, Canada

- Unincorporated community
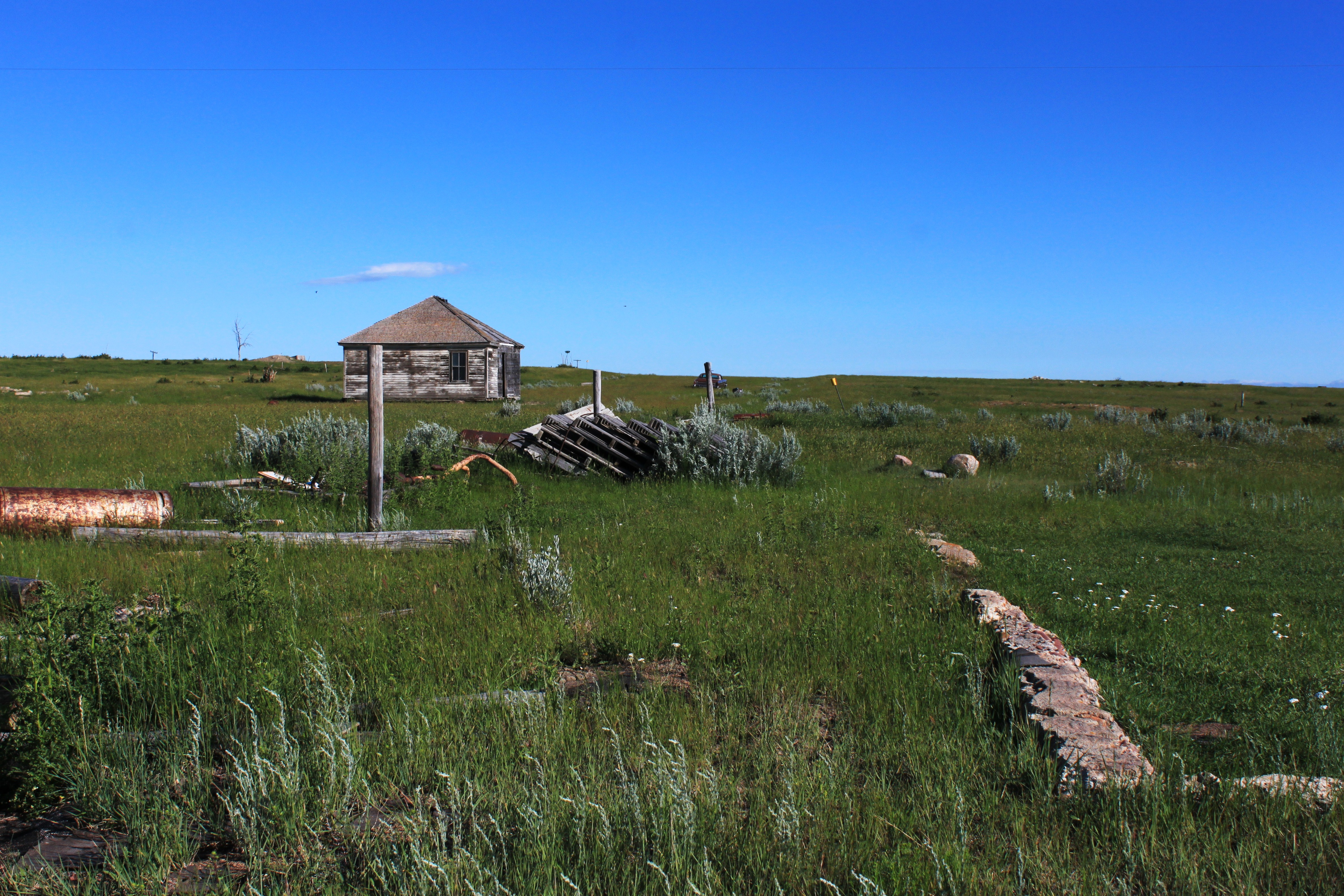
- Main Street Vidora 2010
- Motto: "The Place to Be" (1910s)
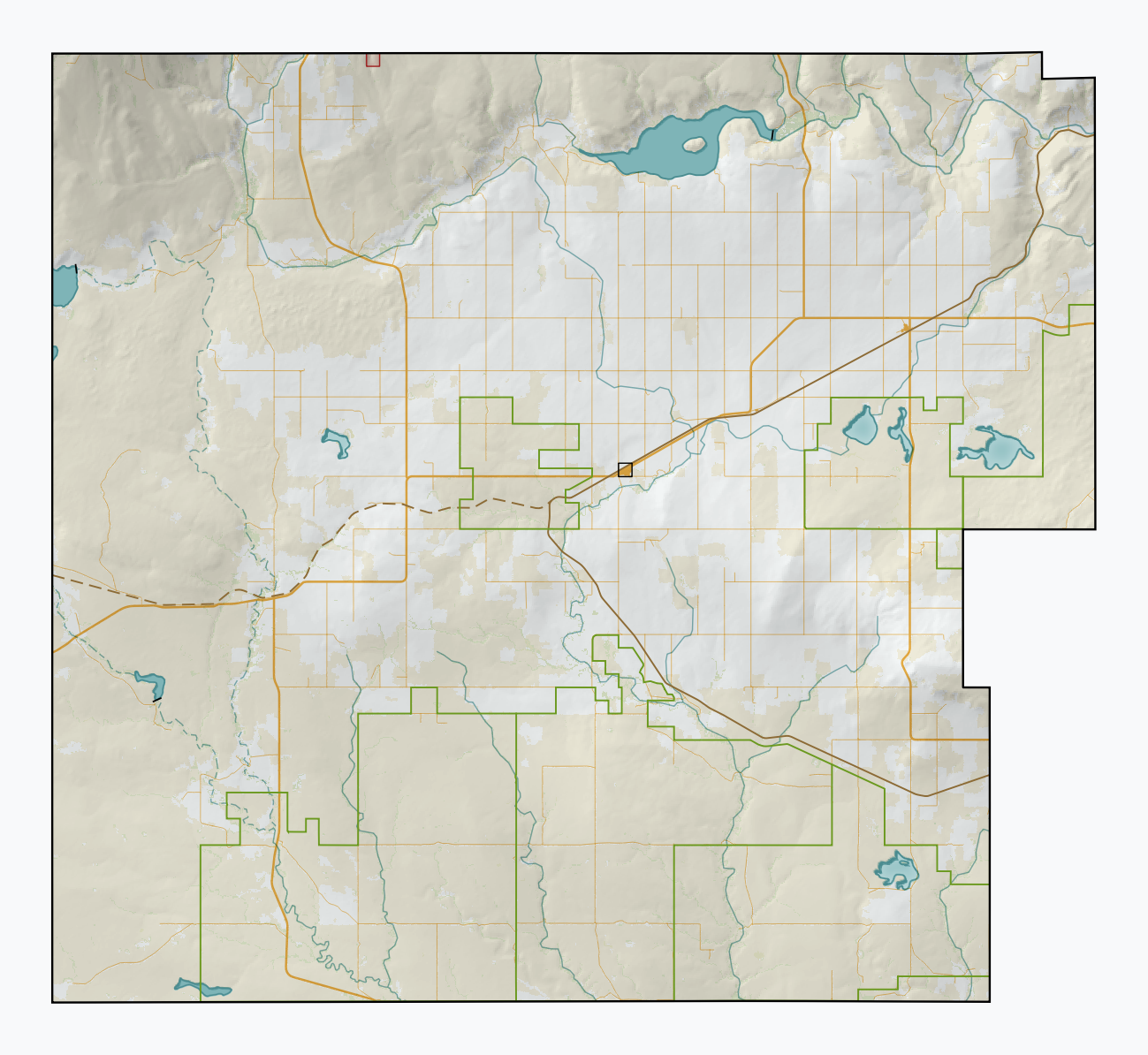
- Location within Reno No. 51 Location within Saskatchewan
- Coordinates: 49.3272°N 109.4084°W
- Country: Canada
- Province: Saskatchewan
- Region: Southwest
- Rural municipality: Reno No. 51
- Established: 1910
- Incorporated (Village): 1917
- Restructured (unincorporated): 1 January 1952

Government
  - Reeve: Brian McMillan
  - Administrator: Lacelle Kim
  - Governing body: Reno No. 51
  - MLA: Doug Steele
  - MP: Jeremy Patzer

Population (1920)
  - Total: 200
- Postal code: S0N 2W0
- Area code: 306
- Highways: Highway 13
- Railways: Great Western Railway

Vidora is an unincorporated community within the Rural Municipality of Reno No. 51, Saskatchewan, Canada. The community once had a population of 200 people in 1940 and has since declined to 1 resident. It previously held village status until it was dissolved as an unincorporated community on 1 January 1952. The community is located between Robsart and Consul on Highway 21 and Highway 13, known as the Red Coat Trail. Very little remains of the former village, only one home that is also used as a post office still stands as of 2008. There are many cement foundations and sidewalks still found scattered around the town site, including the remnants of the old bank vault to the former Municipality Office that was moved to Consul.

== History ==
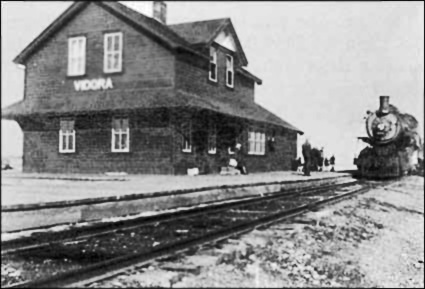
CPR station

In 1910, construction of the Canadian Pacific Railway line came through Vidora. Many of the CPR's engineers and surveyors were housed at a local farmhouse during construction of the rail line. Living at the same house where two girls named "Vivian" and "Dorothy", the engineers and surveyors decided to use their names to name the new area, because of their great hospitality, thus giving the town its name "Vidora". After the land was named, settlers as well as bootleggers began to settle the area starting the community of Vidora. By 1917, the community was incorporated as a village, and now had its very own town Council, and mayor. After becoming a village, Vidora began to grow quite fast and prosperous. By 1920, the village business districts consist of more than twenty businesses, including businesses such as a post office, cafe, pool hall, main hall, banks, lumber yards, general stores, a hotel and a row of five grain elevators. Vidora even had its own electrical power plant.

Prior to January 1, 1952, Vidora was incorporated as a village, and was restructured as an unincorporated community under the jurisdiction of the Rural Municipality of Reno No. 51 on that date.

=== Prohibition ===
Like most towns throughout Alberta and Saskatchewan, Vidora began as a small parcel of land owned by the Canadian Pacific Railway. Like many towns of southern Alberta and Saskatchewan, such as Govenlock, Senate, and Whiskey Gap, Vidora had a fair amount of bootleggers that came into the area to smuggle rum, alcohol, and whisky across the border during prohibition in the United States.

=== The Great Depression ===
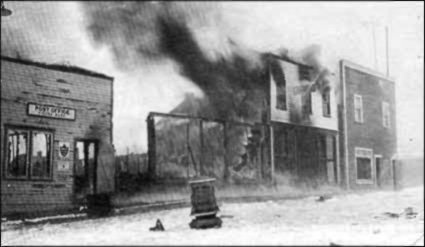
Fire of 1924 wiping out many crucial businesses

Vidora's future looked promising but due to the Great Depression years, with accompanying droughts, falling grain prices and poor crop yields, Vidora's population slowly began to decline. Beginning in 1924, a devastating fire destroyed many important businesses including Vidora's first store, post office, cafe, pool hall and main hall. Then in 1926 and 1928, more vital businesses would also be wiped out by fire. In 1936, the CPR station closed and afterwards moved to Frontier. In 1961, the Vidora General Store was moved to Robsart, then in 1969 the rural municipal office was also moved to Consul as did the Vidora Community Hall in 1976. To mark the end of its long prosperous life, Vidora's five grain elevators closed and were torn down sometime in the 1970s or 1980s.

== Notable people ==
- Lee Morrison (born 6 March 1932 - died 15 March 2026) was a member of the House of Commons of Canada from 1993 to 2000.

== See also ==
- List of communities in Saskatchewan
- Lists of ghost towns in Canada
- List of ghost towns in Saskatchewan
- List of geographic names derived from portmanteaus
- Prohibition in Canada
