= Saskatchewan Highway 13 =

Provincial highway in Saskatchewan, Canada

Highway 13
- Red Coat Trail; Ghost Town Trail
- Highway 13 highlighted in red

Route information
- Maintained by Ministry of Highways and Infrastructure (Saskatchewan)
- Length: 675.3 km (419.6 mi)

Major junctions
- West end: Highway 501 at Alberta border
- Highway 21 near Govenlock and Robsart; Highway 18 at Robsart; Highway 37 at Shaunavon; Highway 4 at Cadillac; Highway 6 near Pangman; CanAm Highway / Highway 39 in Weyburn; Highway 35 in Weyburn; Highway 47 / Highway 33 at Stoughton; Highway 9 at Carlyle; Highway 8 at Redvers
- East end: PTH 2 at Manitoba border near Antler

Location
- Country: Canada
- Province: Saskatchewan
- Rural municipalities: Reno No. 51, White Valley No. 49, Arlington No. 79, Bone Creek No. 108, Wise Creek No. 78, Auvergne No. 76, Pinto Creek No. 75, Wood River No. 74, Stonehenge No. 73, Lake of the Rivers No. 72, Willow Bunch No. 42, Excel No. 71, Key West No. 70, Norton No. 69, Brokenshell No. 68, Weyburn No. 67, Griffin No. 66, Tecumseh No. 65, Brock No. 64, Moose Mountain No. 63, Antler No. 61
- Major cities: Weyburn

Highway system
- Provincial highways in Saskatchewan
← Highway 12	→ Highway 14

Highway 13 is an east–west provincial highway in the southern part of the Canadian province of Saskatchewan. The highway runs from the Alberta border (continuing westward as Alberta Highway 501) until it transitions into Highway 2 at the Manitoba border east of Antler. It is about 676 kilometres (420 mi) long and passes through the city of Weyburn and the towns of Shaunavon, Assiniboia, Redvers, and Carlyle.

Highway 13 is part of the Red Coat Trail that runs through the southern parts of Manitoba, Saskatchewan, and Alberta. Much of the length of the Red Coat Trail follows the route taken by the North-West Mounted Police on their historic March West in 1874. It is also known as the Ghost Town Trail between Govenlock and Wauchope due to a significant number of ghost towns along its route.

== Route description ==
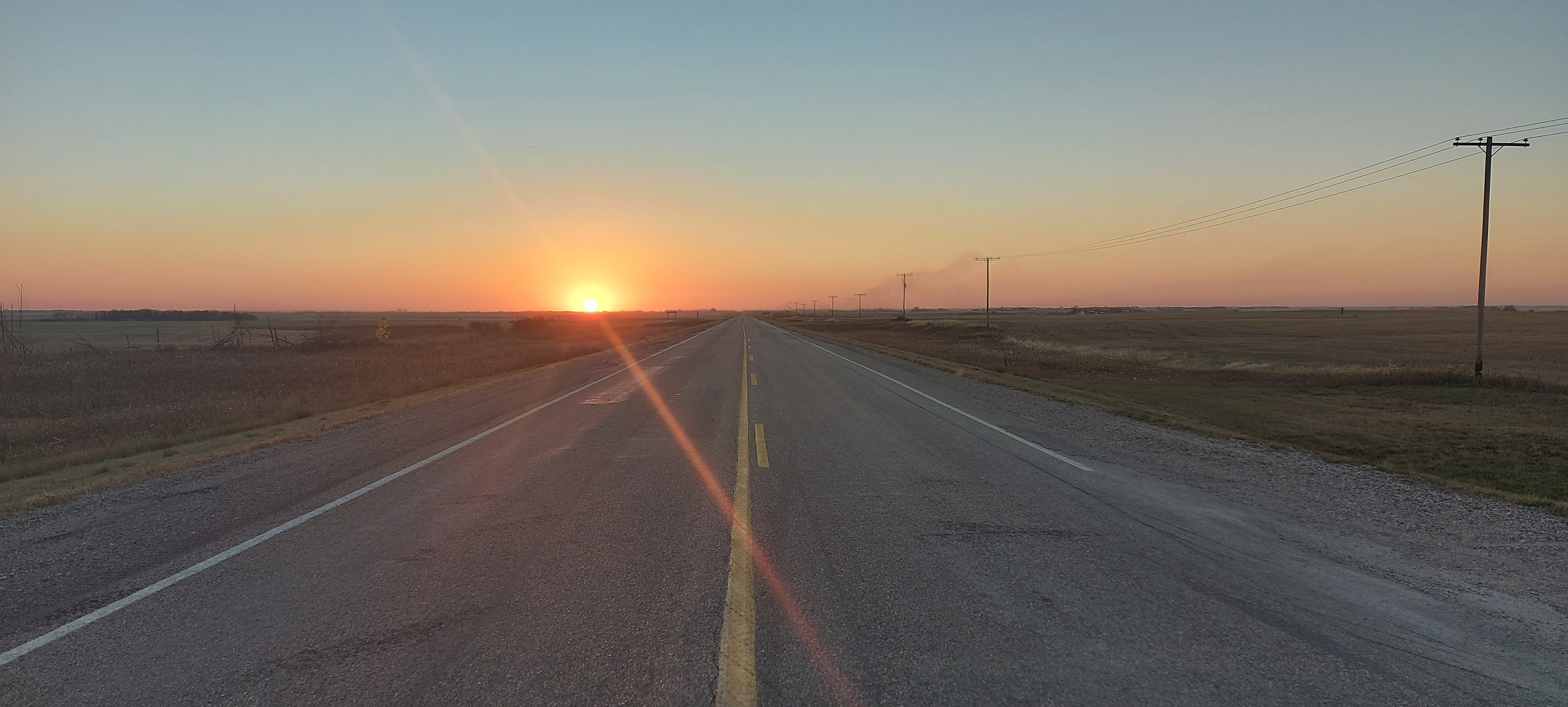
Highway 13 near Antler

Highway 13 runs the width of the province from the Alberta border east to the Manitoba border. It traverses the Missouri Coteau and the Laurentian continental divide in a semi-arid region known as Palliser's Triangle. The terrain of the Missouri Coteau features low hummocky, undulating, rolling hills, potholes, and grasslands.

The western terminus of Highway 13 begins at the Saskatchewan–Alberta border south of the Cypress Hills. Alberta's Highway 501 continues west from that point. Highway 13 travels north-east then east for 14 kilometres (8.7 mi) to Govenlock and the intersection with the north–south Highway 21. The two highways have a 44-kilometre (27 mi) long north-eastward concurrency that ends a few kilometres west of Robsart. Along this segment, the highway provides access to Senate and Consul and crosses Battle Creek. About 6.5 kilometres (4.0 mi) west of Robsart, Highway 21 turns north while 13 continues east. Heading north on 21, the highway traverses the Cypress Hills, provides access to Cypress Hills Interprovincial Park, and meets Highway 1 (the Trans-Canada Highway) north of Maple Creek. At Robsart, Highway 13 is met with the western terminus of Highway 18. Highway 18 — also an east–west highway — parallels Highway 13 to the Manitoba border. Continuing east, Highway 13 skirts the southern slopes of the Cypress Hills to Olga. At Olga, it turns north for several kilometres where it intersects with Highway 706 before resuming its eastward heading. After travelling east for about 14 kilometres (8.7 mi), it turns north and drops into the Frenchman River Valley where it enters the town of Eastend, intersects the east–west Highway 614, and crosses the Frenchman River. Through Eastend, Highway 13 is known as Red Coat Drive. On the north side of Eastend is the Royal Saskatchewan Museum's T.rex Discovery Centre and "home of the world's largest T. rex". The highway then leaves Eastend, climbs out of the valley and heads north-east to Shaunavon. Dollard is the only community on this stretch. At Shaunavon, it meets the north-bound Highway 37 where it begins a 9.5-kilometre (5.9 mi) long concurrency. From the end of the concurrency, 37 continues north to Gull Lake and Highway 1 while 13 travels east to Assiniboia.

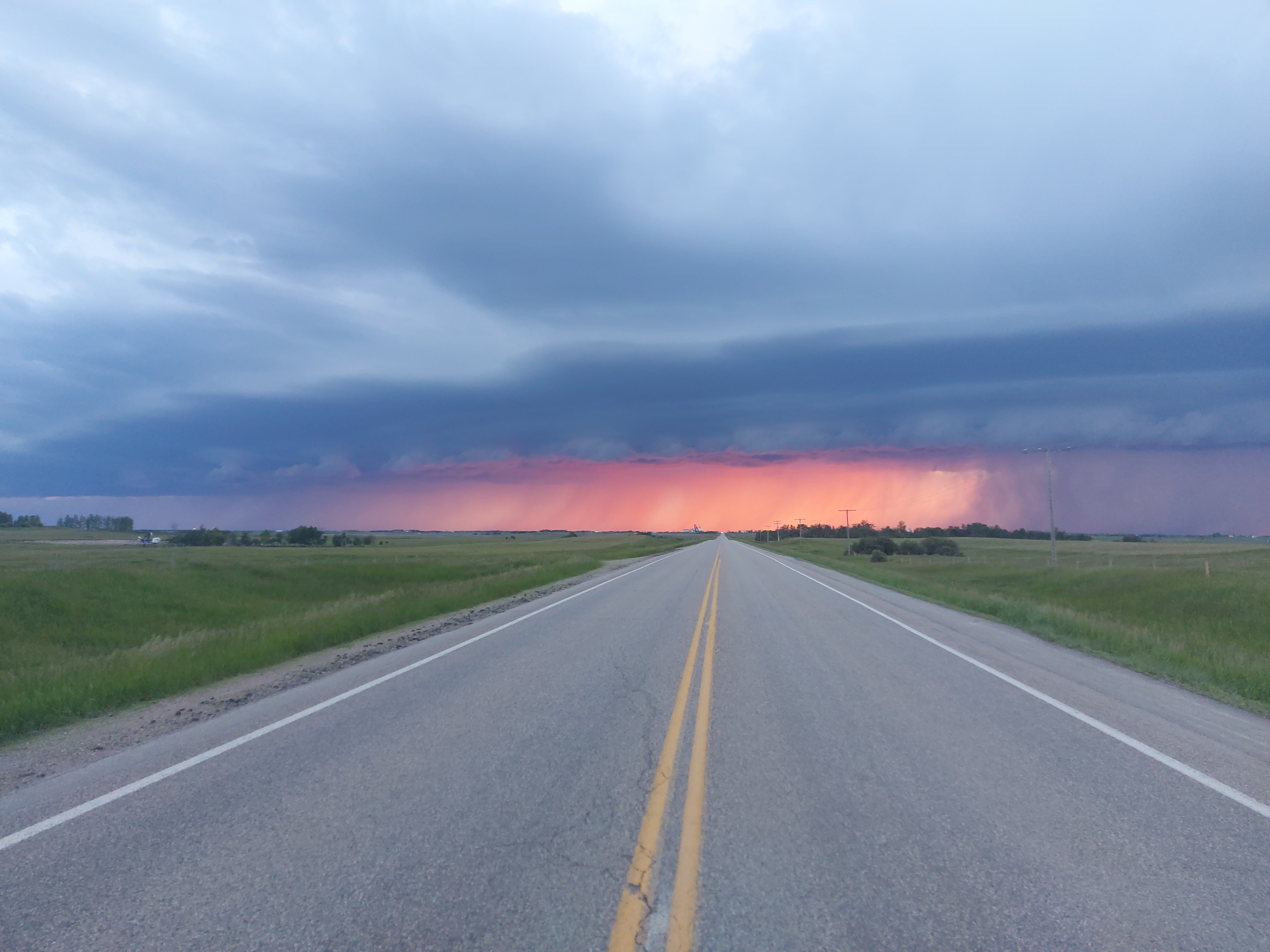
Highway 13 near Griffin

From the junction with 37, 13 heads east for about 10 kilometres (6.2 mi) where it provides access to Instow and crosses Grassy Creek. East of the Grassy Creek crossing, and about 2 kilometres (1.2 mi) west of Scotsguard, the highway crosses Notukeu Creek — a tributary of the Wood River. About 300 metres (980 ft) downstream, the abandoned Highway 13 six-arch bowstring bridge crosses the creek and the Great Western Railway shortline railway tracks. The bridge, built in about 1936, was part of the original routing of Highway 13 until it was decommissioned. From that crossing, the highway and creek then roughly follow each other, criss-crossing several times, eastward to Ponteix. At Ponteix, along the Notukeu Creek, is Notukeu Regional Park. Several communities are along this segment of highway, including Admiral, Crichton, and Cadillac. It also intersects Highways 631, 4, and 628. Continuing east from Ponteix, Highway 13 provides access to Aneroid, Hazenmore, Kincaid, Meyronne, Woodrow, Lafleche, Melaval, and Limerick. About 4.5 kilometres (2.8 mi) east of Woodrow, the highway crosses the Wood River, which has its headwaters to the south in the Wood Mountain Hills. Highways that intersect 13 along this stretch include 612, 19, 611, 610, 58, and 358. From the 358 intersection at Limerick, Highway 13 travels west for a further 20 kilometres (12 mi) to Highway 2 at Assiniboia. Highway 2 and 13 share a 1.5-kilometre (0.93 mi) long concurrency through Assiniboia. Highway 2 splits off south at Centre Street while 13 heads south-east out of town. Assiniboia Regional Park, accessed from Highway 13, is split into three sections — Centennial Park in town, a 9-hole golf course south-east of town, and Willows Dam east of town.

Highway 13 continues south-east to Highway 36 at the northern edge of the Big Muddy Badlands. Highways 36 and 13 share a 9.7-kilometre (6.0 mi) long east-bound concurrency that passes just north of Verwood. South on 36 heads to Willow Bunch and the U.S. border while north-bound heads to the Dirt Hills and Highway 2 south of Moose Jaw. Leaving the concurrency, 13 heads east to Highway 35 on the west side of Weyburn — the only city on Highway 13. Communities from the intersection with 36 to Weyburn include Horizon, Glasnevin, Ogema, Amulet, Pangman, Khedive, Forward, and Trossachs. Highways that intersect 13 along this portion include 334, 623, 6, 28, and 621.

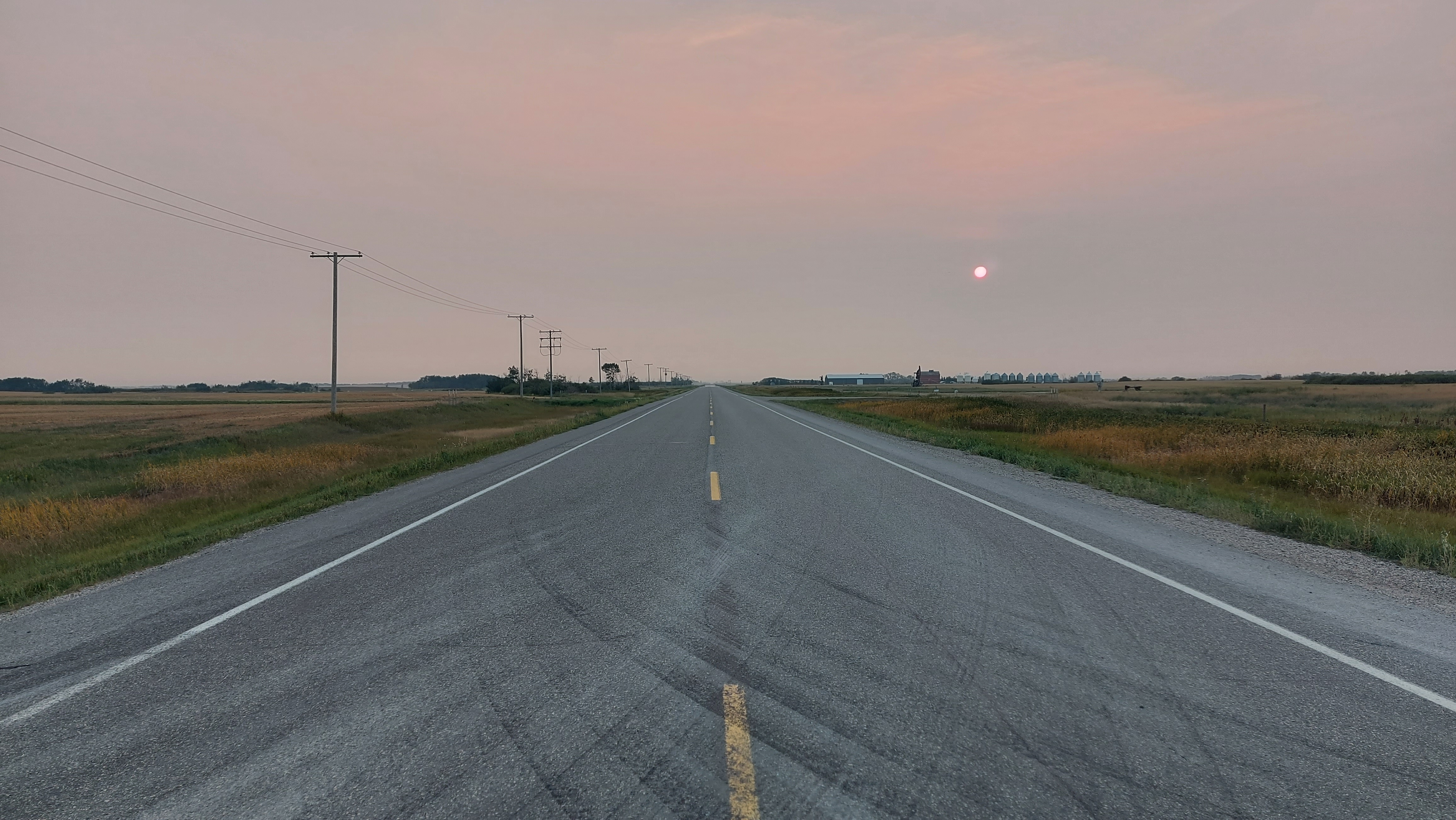
Smoke from the BC wildfires turning the skies of south-east Saskatchewan hazy. Sunset over Highway 13 three miles west of Stoughton (August 2021).

In the spring of 2025, the construction of a roundabout was begun at the intersection of 39 and 13. Completed in the fall of 2025, it cost $29 million and included a further 5.8 kilometres (3.6 mi) of twinning on Highway 39. Continuing east from the roundabout, Highway 13 crosses the Souris River and enters the city of Weyburn. It runs east through Weyburn as 1st Avenue NW until the intersection with the north–south Hwy 35, at which point it becomes 1st Avenue NE. Exiting Weyburn, the highway intersects with Range Road 2142, which north-bound goes to North Weyburn and south-bound (also known as Inland Terminal Road) to Highway 39 south-east of Weyburn. Travelling east from that intersection, Highway 13 continues towards the Saskatchewan–Manitoba border. Hume, Griffin, Froude, and Stoughton are the next communities east of Weyburn. At Stoughton, 13 intersects with 47, which is a north–south highway. South on 47 is Estevan and the U.S. border while north is Highway 1. Continuing east, 13 provides access to Forget, Kisbey, Arcola, and Carlyle and crosses Moose Mountain Creek. Through Carlyle, 13 shares a short 1.8-kilometre (1.1 mi) long concurrency with the north–south Highway 9. North-bound on 9 travels through Moose Mountain Provincial Park en route to Whitewood and Highway 1 while south-bound heads to the U.S. border. Continuing east to the Manitoba border, 13 passes by Manor, Wauchope, Redvers, and Antler and crosses the Antler River and Gainsborough Creek. It intersects Highways 603, 601, 8, and 600 en route. Once at the border, it crosses Graham Creek and transitions into Manitoba Highway 2, which has its eastern terminus at Winnipeg's Perimeter Highway.

== Upgrades and improvements ==
- In 2025, a roundabout was constructed at the intersection of Highway 39 and 13.
- In 2026, Highway 13's bridge over Moose Mountain Creek was replaced.
- In 2026, 24.9 km (15.5 mi) of Highway 13 from Redvers east to Manitoba was repaved, had the shoulders widened, and some culverts replaced at a cost of $9.5 million.

== Major intersections ==
From west to east:

Rural municipality	Location	km	mi	Destinations	Notes
Reno No. 51		0.0	0.0	Highway 501 (Red Coat Trail) – Manyberries, Lethbridge	Continuation into Alberta
Reno No. 51	Govenlock	14.5	9.0	Highway 21 south – U.S. border (Port of Willow Creek)	West end of Highway 21 concurrency
Reno No. 51	Senate	29.1	18.1	Highway 615 north – Fort Walsh	
Reno No. 51	Consul	42.1	26.2	Range Road 3271	
Reno No. 51		58.4	36.3	Highway 21 north – Cypress Hills Interprovincial Park, Maple Creek	East end of Highway 21 concurrency
Reno No. 51	Robsart	64.9	40.3	Highway 18 east – Frontier, Climax	
White Valley No. 49		88.0	54.7	Highway 706 north – Ravenscrag	
White Valley No. 49	Eastend	111.9	69.5	Highway 614 – Loomis, Piapot	
Arlington No. 79		122.3	76.0	Highway 633 north – South Fork, Tompkins	
Arlington No. 79		132.2	82.1	Highway 613 south – Frontier	West end of Highway 613 concurrency
Arlington No. 79	Dollard	133.9	83.2	Highway 613 north	East end of Highway 613 concurrency
Arlington No. 79	Shaunavon	146.1	90.8	Highway 37 south to Highway 722 east – Climax	West end of Highway 37 concurrency
Bone Creek No. 108		155.5	96.6	Highway 37 north – Gull Lake Highway 724 west	East end of concurrency with Highway 37
Bone Creek No. 108	Scotsguard	175.0	108.7	Highway 631 north	
Wise Creek No. 77		186.4	115.8	Admiral access road	
Wise Creek No. 77	Cadillac	204.6	127.1	Highway 4 – Swift Current, Val Marie, U.S. border (Port of Monchy)	
Auvergne No. 76		222.4	138.2	Highway 628 – Ponteix	
Auvergne No. 76	Aneroid	236.0	146.6	Highway 609 north – Vanguard	
Pinto Creek No. 75	Hazenmore	249.4	155.0	Range Road 3092	
Pinto Creek No. 75		257.8	160.2	Highway 19 south – Mankota	West end of Highway 19 concurrency
Pinto Creek No. 75	Kincaid	259.0	160.9	Highway 19 north – Hodgeville	East end of Highway 19 concurrency
Pinto Creek No. 75	Meyronne	271.1	168.5	Highway 611 south – McCord	
Wood River No. 74	Woodrow	279.8	173.9	Highway 610	
Wood River No. 74		289.5	179.9	Highway 58 south – Fir Mountain	East end of Highway 58 concurrency
Wood River No. 74	Lafleche	291.2	180.9	Highway 58 north – Gravelbourg	West end of Highway 58 concurrency
Stonehenge No. 73	Limerick	313.5	194.8	Highway 358 south – Wood Mountain	
Stonehenge No. 73		317.2	197.1	Highway 608 north – Mazenod	
Stonehenge No. 73– Lake of the Rivers No. 72 border	Assiniboia	333.6	207.3	To Highway 717 east Highway 2 north – Moose Jaw	West end of Highway 2 concurrency
Lake of the Rivers No. 72	Assiniboia	335.0	208.2	Highway 2 south (Centre Street) – U.S. border (Port of West Poplar River)	East end of Highway 2 concurrency
Lake of the Rivers No. 72	Assiniboia	335.8	208.7	Leeville Street (Highway 717 east)	
Willow Bunch No. 42		362.4	225.2	Highway 36 south – Willow Bunch	West end of Highway 36 concurrency
Willow Bunch No. 42		365.9	227.4	Verwood access road	
Excel No. 71		372.1	231.2	Highway 36 north – Crane Valley, Moose Jaw	East end of Highway 36 concurrency
Excel No. 71		383.7	238.4	Highway 624 – Ormiston, Viceroy	
Key West No. 70		402.5	250.1	Highway 34 south – Bengough; Highway 334 north – Avonlea	
Norton No. 69	Ogema	417.5	259.4	Highway 623 north	
Norton No. 69		437.8	272.0	Pangman access road	
Norton No. 69		442.2	274.8	Highway 6 – Regina, U.S. border (Port of Regway)	
Brokenshell No. 68		465.0	288.9	Highway 28 south – Radville	
Brokenshell No. 68		474.3	294.7	Highway 621 north – Yellow Grass	
Weyburn No. 67	No major junctions				
City of Weyburn		494.7	307.4	Highway 39 / CanAm Highway – Moose Jaw, Regina, Estevan	
City of Weyburn		495.9	308.1	Crosses the Souris River	
City of Weyburn		497.1	308.9	Highway 35 (King Street / Government Road) – Francis, U.S. border (Port of Oungre)	
Weyburn No. 67	No major junctions				
Griffin No. 66	Griffin	528.1	328.1	Highway 606 – Midale	
Tecumseh No. 65	Stoughton	557.4	346.4	Highway 47 – Grenfell, Estevan; To Highway 33 west – Francis, Regina	
Tecumseh No. 65		568.3	353.1	Forget access road	
Tecumseh No. 65		568.8	353.4	Highway 616 north – Peebles	
Brock No. 64	Kisbey	582.0	361.6	Highway 605 – Lampman, Kipling	
Brock No. 64	Arcola	596.9	370.9	Highway 604 south	
Moose Mountain No. 63	Carlyle	611.7	380.1	Highway 9 north – Whitewood, Yorkton	West end of Highway 9 concurrency
Moose Mountain No. 63	Carlyle	613.4	381.1	Highway 9 south – Oxbow	East end of Highway 9 concurrency
Moose Mountain No. 63	Manor	627.0	389.6	Highway 603 – Wawota	
Antler No. 61		638.5	396.7	Highway 601 north	West end of Highway 601 concurrency
Antler No. 61		640.6	398.1	Highway 601 south – Alida	East end of Highway 601 concurrency
Antler No. 61	Redvers	655.6	407.4	Highway 8 – Carievale, Moosomin	
Antler No. 61		667.1	414.5	Highway 600 north – Maryfield	West end of Highway 600 concurrency
Antler No. 61		672.0	417.6	Highway 600 south – Antler, Gainsborough	East end of Highway 600 concurrency
Antler No. 61		675.3	419.6	PTH 2 (Red Coat Trail) – Souris, Winnipeg	Continuation into Manitoba
1.000 mi = 1.609 km; 1.000 km = 0.621 mi: Concurrency terminus; Route transition

== See also ==
- Transportation in Saskatchewan
- Roads in Saskatchewan
