= Froude, Saskatchewan =

Community in Saskatchewan, Canada

Froude
- Unincorporated Community
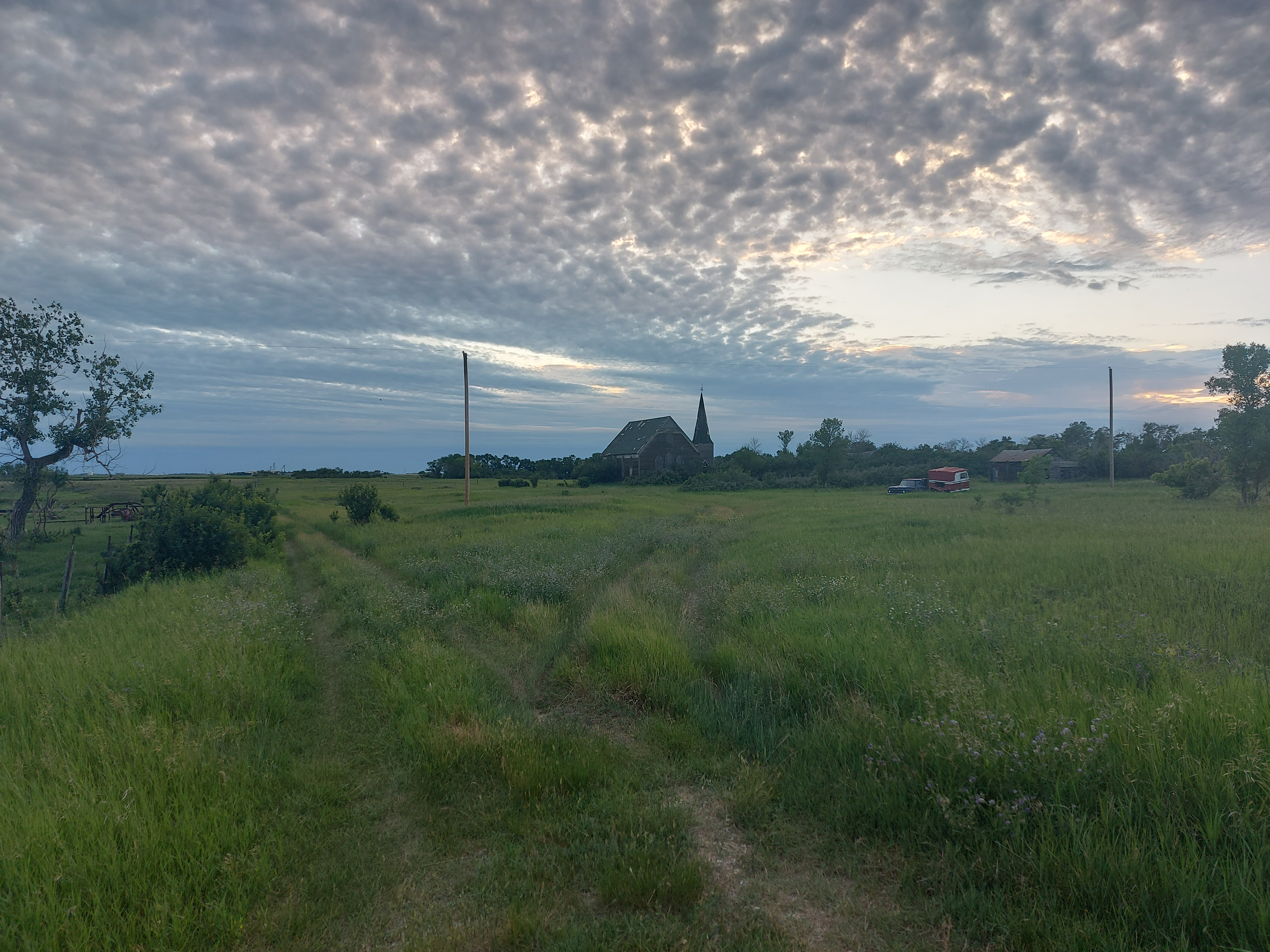
- Abandoned church in Froude

- Location in Saskatchewan Froude (Canada)
- Coordinates: 49°40′19″N 103°16′50″W
- Country: Canada
- Province: Saskatchewan
- Region: Southeast Saskatchewan
- Census division: 2
- Rural Municipality: Griffin No. 66
- Established: 1908

Government
  - Reeve: David Hoffort
  - Administrator: Laureen Keating
  - Governing body: Rural Municipality of Griffin No. 66

Population (2011)
  - Total: 3
- Time zone: CST
- Area code: 306
- Highways: Highway 13
- Railways: Canadian Pacific (abandoned)

Froude is an unincorporated community in the Canadian province of Saskatchewan, located in the Rural Municipality of Griffin No. 66, along the historic Ghost Town Trail, also known as the Red Coat Trail or Highway 13. The community is located approximately 42 km east of the city of Weyburn and 137 km southeast of the provincial capital city of Regina.

== History ==
Froude is named after the English historian James Anthony Froude.

The post office opened on June 1, 1908, in a private dwelling, Section 27, Township 8, Range 10, W2. On December 31, 1969, the post office shut its doors.

== Demographics ==
The community of Froude had a peak population of 200 citizens in 1920–21. It has struggled over the years to maintain a steady population and has now become a semi–ghost town, with few residents remaining.

== Businesses ==
Froude once had a booming economy with a variety of businesses such as Canadian Pacific Railway telegraph and Dominion Express services, two grain elevators, Federal Grain Co. and North Star Grain Co. offices, a bank, hardware store, general store, blacksmith, and a Presbyterian church.

== Location geography ==
Froude is located in the Federal Electoral District of Souris—Moose Mountain in the RM of Griffin No. 66, at an elevation of 2,012 feet (613 m).

== Education ==
Froude School District No. 1896 was organized in the fall of 1907 and closed in June 1970.

== See also ==
- List of communities in Saskatchewan
- List of ghost towns in Saskatchewan
