= Cadillac, Saskatchewan =

Village in Saskatchewan, Canada

Cadillac
- Village
- Village of Cadillac
- Location within Wise Creek No. 77 Location within Saskatchewan
- Coordinates: 49.7255°N 107.7393°W
- Country: Canada
- Province: Saskatchewan
- Rural municipality: Wise Creek No. 77
- Post office Founded: 1911-03-01

Government
  - Type: Municipal
  - Governing body: Cadillac Village Council
  - Mayor: Bryce Evesque
  - Administrator: Melissa Boucher

Area
  - Total: 1.05 km^{2} (0.41 sq mi)

Population (2016)
  - Total: 92
  - Density: 87.7/km^{2} (227/sq mi)
- Time zone: UTC-6 (CST)
- Postal code: S0N 0K0
- Area code: 306
- Highways: Highway 4 Highway 13
- Railways: Great Western Railway
- Waterways: Notukeu Creek

Cadillac (2016 population: 92) is a village in the Canadian province of Saskatchewan within the Rural Municipality of Wise Creek No. 77 and Census Division No. 4. It is at the intersection of Highway 13, the Red Coat Trail, and Highway 4 in the southwest portion of the province. Located 62 kilometres (39 mi) south of the city of Swift Current, The three largest buildings remaining in the community are the former Cadillac School, the Cadillac Skating and Curling Rink, and the former Saskatchewan Wheat Pool grain elevator.

== History ==
Cadillac incorporated as a village on July 2, 1914. It was named after Cadillac, Michigan, the starting point for many early French speaking settlers who began arriving about 1910.

== Demographics ==
Population history (1981–2016)
Year	Pop.	±%
1981	173	—
1986	176	+1.7%
1991	134	−23.9%
1996	97	−27.6%
2001	95	−2.1%
2006	80	−15.8%
2011	78	−2.5%
2016	92	+17.9%
2021	116	+26.1%
Source: Statistics Canada via Saskatchewan Bureau of Statistics

In the 2021 Census of Population conducted by Statistics Canada, Cadillac had a population of 116 living in 55 of its 63 total private dwellings, a change of 26.1% from its 2016 population of 92. With a land area of 1.16 km^{2} (0.45 sq mi), it had a population density of 100.0/km^{2} (259.0/sq mi) in 2021.

In the 2016 Census of Population, the Village of Cadillac recorded a population of 92 living in 50 of its 66 total private dwellings, a 15.2% change from its 2011 population of 78. With a land area of 1.05 km^{2} (0.41 sq mi), it had a population density of 87.6/km^{2} (226.9/sq mi) in 2016.

== Notable people ==
- Mark Lamb, former NHL player

== See also ==
- List of communities in Saskatchewan
- List of francophone communities in Saskatchewan
- List of villages in Saskatchewan
