= Glasnevin, Saskatchewan =

Community in Saskatchewan, Canada

Coordinates: 49.325°N 105.023°W

Glasnevin is an unincorporated community in the Rural Municipality of Key West No. 70 in the Canadian province of Saskatchewan. Located on Highway 13, it is approximately 10 km west of Ogema.

== See also ==
- List of communities in Saskatchewan
- Lists of Canadian tornadoes and tornado outbreaks
