= Forward, Saskatchewan =

Community in Saskatchewan, Canada

Forward is a hamlet in the Rural Municipality of Norton No. 69, Saskatchewan, Canada. It previously held the status of a village until December 31, 1947. It is situated along Highway 13.

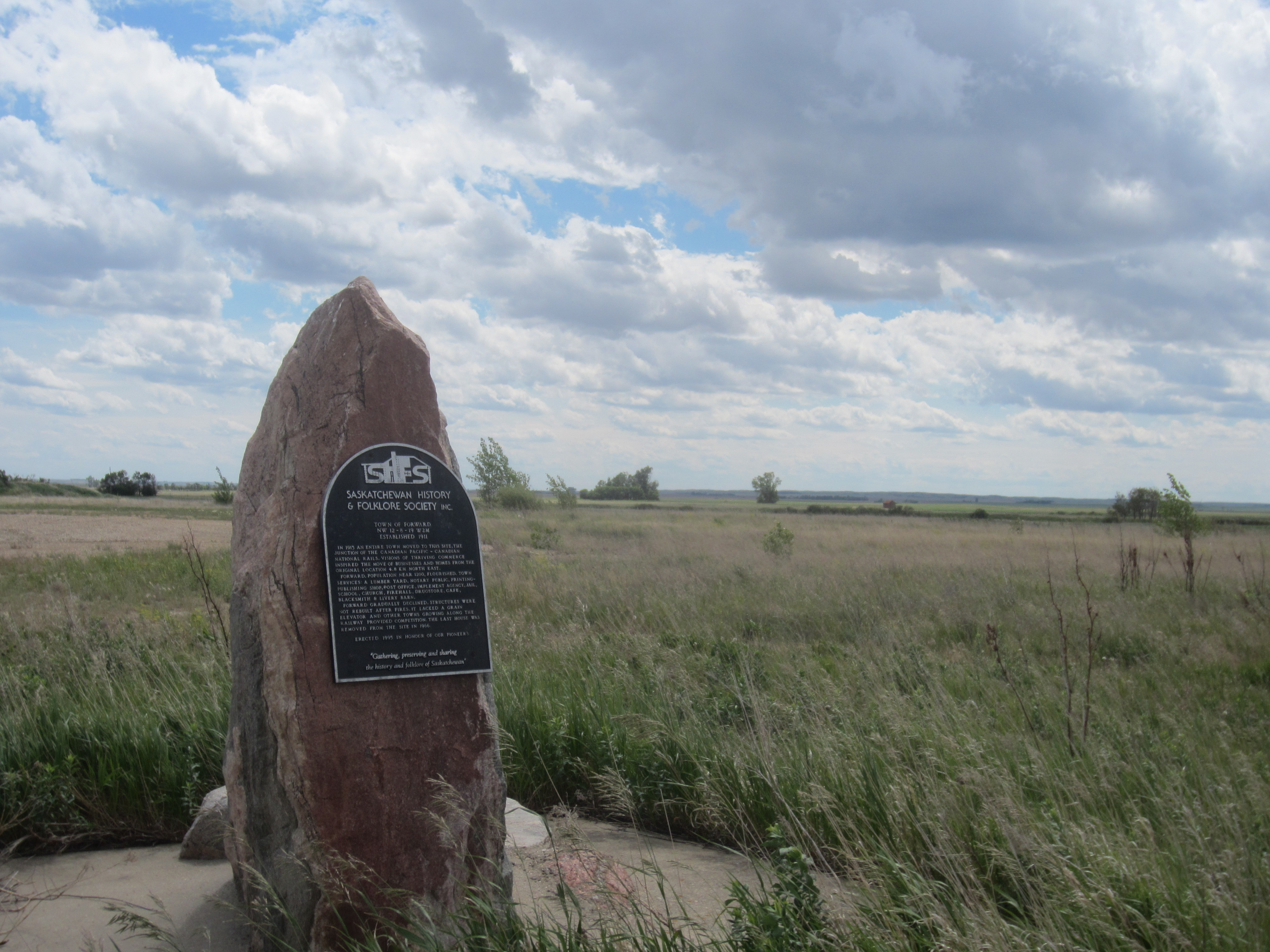
Cairn marking former site of the town of Forward near 49.63882 N, 104.462317W, just off Saskatchewan Highway 13 about 14 km (8.7 mi) east of intersection with Hwy 6.

== Demographics ==
Prior to December 31, 1947, Forward was incorporated as a village, and was restructured as a hamlet under the jurisdiction of the Rural municipality of Norton on that date.

Canada census – Forward, Saskatchewan community profile

Population
Land area
Population density
Median age
Private dwellings
Median household income

== Cairn ==
A cairn marks the former site of the town, off Highway 13 about 43 km West of Weyburn. The plaque was installed in 1995 by the Saskatchewan History and Folklore Society and reads:

Town of Forward

NW 12-8-19 W2M

Established 1911

In 1913 an entire town moved to this site, the junction of the Canadian Pacific-Canadian National rails. Visions of thriving commerce inspired the move of businesses and homes from the original location 4.8 km north east.

Forward, population near 1200, flourished. Town services: A lumber yard, notary public, printing-publishing shop, post office, implement agency, jail, school, church, firehall, drugstore, cafe, blacksmith, & livery barn.

Forward gradually declined. Structures were not rebuilt after fires. It lacked a grain elevator and other towns growing along the railway provided competition. The last house was removed from the site in 1966.

== See also ==
- List of communities in Saskatchewan
- List of hamlets in Saskatchewan
