= Amulet, Saskatchewan =

Community in Saskatchewan, Canada

Coordinates: 49.62°N 104.75°W

Amulet is an unincorporated community in the Rural Municipality of Norton No. 69, Saskatchewan, Canada. It previously held village status until January 1, 1965. The community has a population of 33 people.

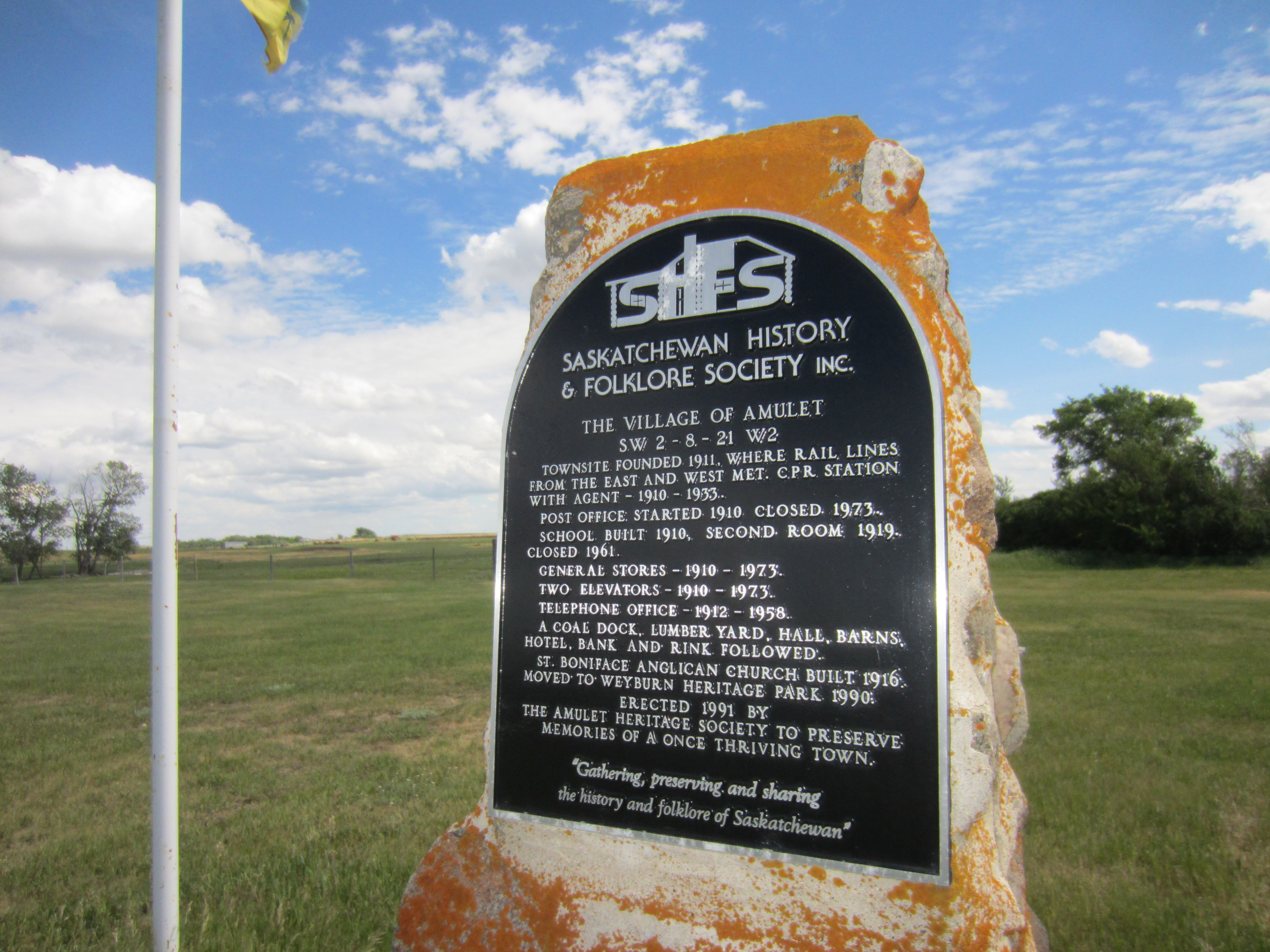
Cairn marking the former location of the town of Amulet, off Highway 13 about 65 km (40 mi) west of Weyburn.

The townsite was formally founded in 1911 when the railway station was constructed in 1910. A post office, general store, and two grain elevators were also built in 1910, but all were closed in 1973. A school was also built in 1910 and a second room added in 1919, but it was closed in 1961. St. Boniface Anglican Church was built in 1916, but moved to Weyburn Heritage Village in 1990.

== History ==
Prior to January 1, 1965, Amulet was incorporated as a village, and was restructured as an unincorporated community under the jurisdiction of the RM of Norton No. 69 on that date.

== Demographics ==
Canada census – Amulet, Saskatchewan community profile

Population
Land area
Population density
Median age
Private dwellings
Median household income

== Climate ==
Climate data for Amulet, Saskatchewan
Month	Jan	Feb	Mar	Apr	May	Jun	Jul	Aug	Sep	Oct	Nov	Dec	Year
Record high °C (°F)	11 (52)	16.5 (61.7)	22.2 (72.0)	32 (90)	38 (100)	40 (104)	40 (104)	39 (102)	37 (99)	33 (91)	23 (73)	14.5 (58.1)	40 (104)
Mean daily maximum °C (°F)	−8.9 (16.0)	−5 (23)	1.5 (34.7)	11.1 (52.0)	18.4 (65.1)	23.1 (73.6)	25.8 (78.4)	25.7 (78.3)	18.9 (66.0)	11.7 (53.1)	0.5 (32.9)	−6.3 (20.7)	9.7 (49.5)
Mean daily minimum °C (°F)	−19.1 (−2.4)	−14.9 (5.2)	−8.9 (16.0)	−1.6 (29.1)	4.9 (40.8)	9.7 (49.5)	11.9 (53.4)	11 (52)	5.2 (41.4)	−0.8 (30.6)	−9.1 (15.6)	−16.2 (2.8)	−2.3 (27.9)
Record low °C (°F)	−39.4 (−38.9)	−40 (−40)	−35 (−31)	−25 (−13)	−8.5 (16.7)	−1.5 (29.3)	3.3 (37.9)	−1.5 (29.3)	−9 (16)	−21 (−6)	−32 (−26)	−42 (−44)	−42 (−44)
Average precipitation mm (inches)	25.1 (0.99)	19.9 (0.78)	29.6 (1.17)	30.5 (1.20)	61.3 (2.41)	68.3 (2.69)	61 (2.4)	43.5 (1.71)	35.1 (1.38)	21.9 (0.86)	17.8 (0.70)	24.8 (0.98)	438.8 (17.28)
Average snowfall cm (inches)	24.9 (9.8)	19.3 (7.6)	26 (10)	11.7 (4.6)	6.8 (2.7)	0.1 (0.0)	0 (0)	0 (0)	1.1 (0.4)	6.7 (2.6)	16.9 (6.7)	24.3 (9.6)	137.8 (54.3)
Source: Environment Canada

== See also ==
- List of communities in Saskatchewan
