= Verwood, Saskatchewan =

Community in Saskatchewan, Canada

Verwood
- Unincorporated community
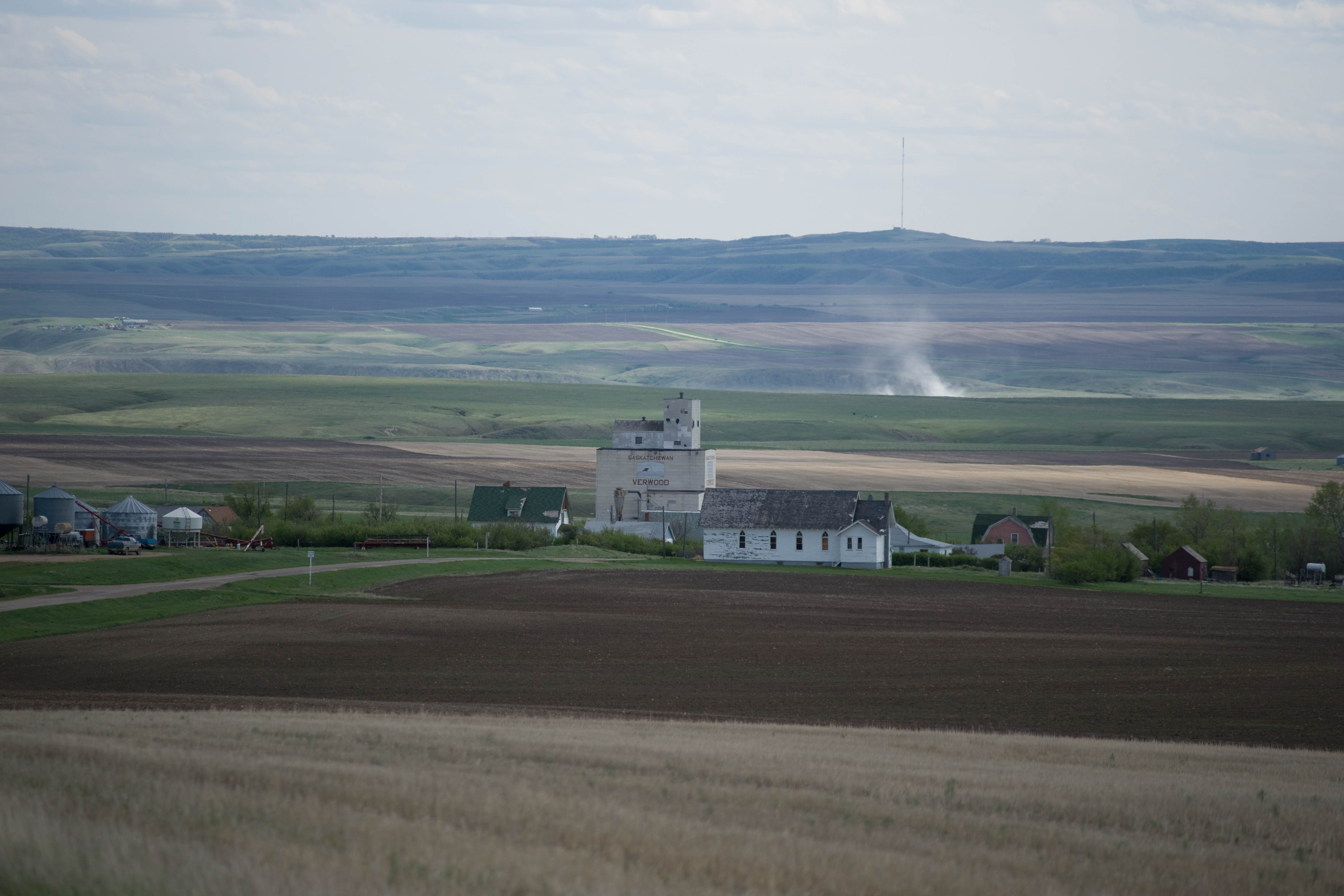
- Verwood

- Location within Saskatchewan Location within Canada
- Coordinates: 49.51667°N 105.616667°W
- Country: Canada
- Province: Saskatchewan
- Region: South Central
- Rural Municipality: Excel No. 71
- Post office established: 1913-05-01
- Restructured (Unincorporated community): December 31, 1954

Government
  - Governing body: Excel No. 71
  - MLA: Dave Marit
  - MP: Jeremy Patzer
- Time zone: CST
- Postal code: S0N
- Area code: 306
- Highways: Highway 13; Highway 36
- Railways: Great Western Railway

Verwood is an unincorporated community in the Rural Municipality of Excel No. 71, Saskatchewan, Canada. The community previously held the status of a village until December 31, 1954.

== History ==
The village was named after its first resident to die, six-year-old Vera Ann Wood.

Prior to December 31, 1954, Verwood was incorporated as a village, and was restructured as an unincorporated community under the jurisdiction of the Rural Municipality of Excel on that date.

== See also ==
- List of communities in Saskatchewan
