= Senate, Saskatchewan =

Community in Saskatchewan, Canada

Senate
- Unincorporated community
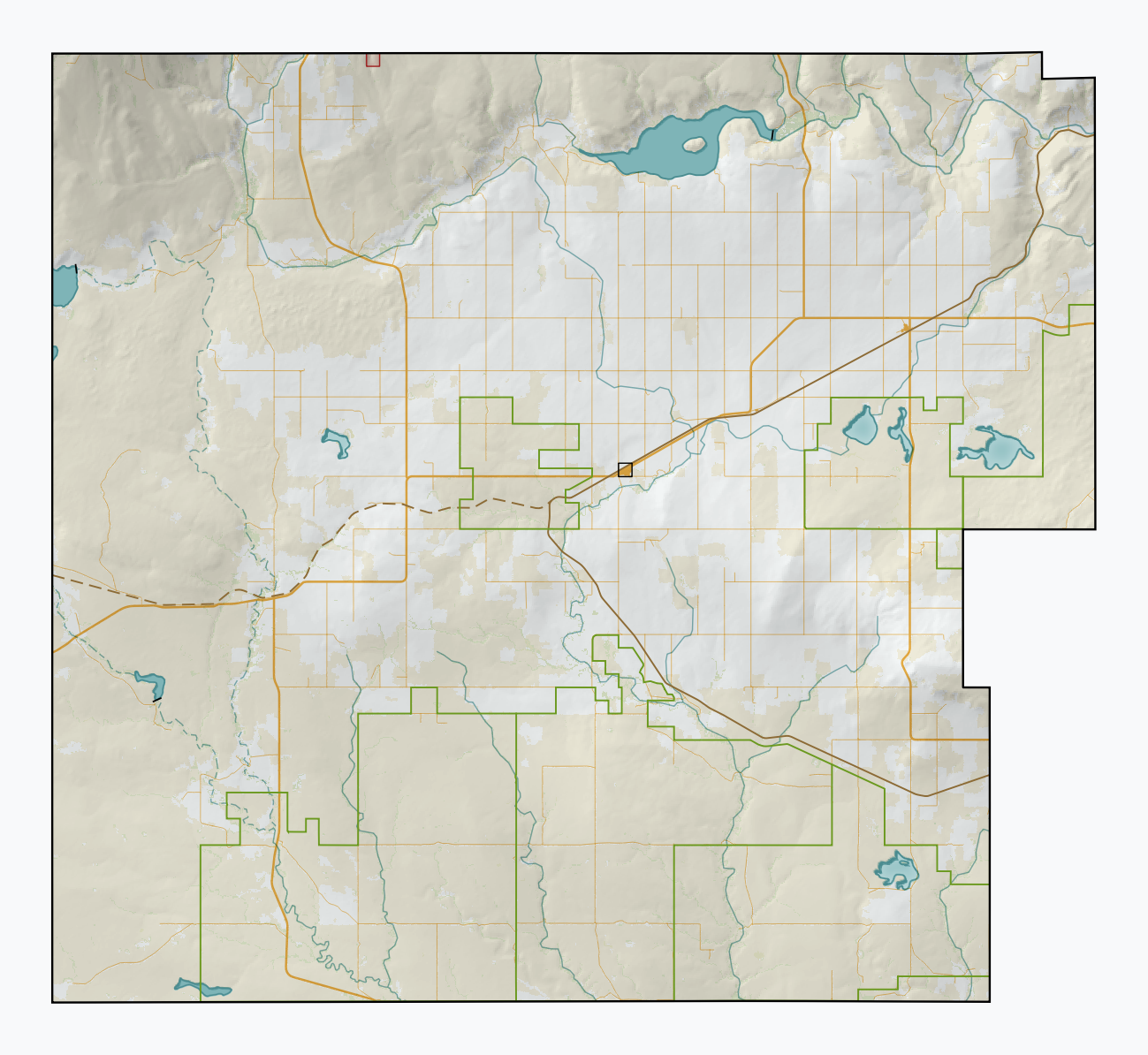
- Location within Reno No. 51 Location within Saskatchewan
- Coordinates: 49.2745°N 109.7002°W
- Country: Canada
- Province: Saskatchewan
- Region: Southwest Saskatchewan
- Census division: 4
- Rural Municipality: Reno No. 51
- Established: 1910
- Incorporated (Village): 1914-1994
- Dissolved (unincorporated: January 1, 1994

Government
  - Administrator: Lacelle Kim
  - Governing body: Reno No. 51

Population (1940)
  - Total: 63
- Time zone: CST
- Postal code: S0N 2G0
- Area code: 306
- Highways: Highway 13 / Highway 21
- Railways: Great Western Railway

Senate is an unincorporated community within the Rural Municipality of Reno No. 51, Saskatchewan, Canada. The village had a population of 63 around 1940 and has since declined to 0 residents. The townsite is located along Highway 21 and Highway 13 (also known as the Red Coat Trail), about 20 kilometres (12 mi) east of the Alberta–Saskatchewan border and is about 200 kilometres (120 mi) south-west of the city of Swift Current.

== History ==
Senate's population peaked at 63 in the 1940s and was a stopping point for the Canadian Pacific Railway. For a few years, Senate even had its own train ticket agent.

The west had just been opened up to waves of European settlers seeking prosperity, and at first, the future appeared promising for Senate and several others along Highway 13.

During Senate's best years, the community had two elevators, a five-room hotel and restaurant, blacksmith shop, lumberyard and Kalmring's general store and gas station. For leisure, the citizens of Senate also built a tennis court and a baseball diamond across the train tracks.

But as in most other locales along southwest Saskatchewan, Senate's fortunes declined after the 1940s. Regional farm consolidation, drought and rural depopulation ended all hope for any lasting life at Senate.

By early 1983, the community was empty. In 1994, with the railway and elevators also gone, rural municipality officials brought in the bulldozers and levelled Senate's remaining dilapidated buildings and dumped part of the debris into a nearby landfill.

== Demographics ==
Prior to January 1, 1994, Senate was incorporated as a village, and was dissolved into an unincorporated community under the jurisdiction of the Rural municipality of Reno on that date.

Canada census – Senate, Saskatchewan community profile

Population
Land area
Population density
Median age
Private dwellings
Median household income

== See also ==
- List of communities in Saskatchewan
- List of ghost towns in Canada
- List of ghost towns in Saskatchewan
