= Willow Creek Border Crossing =

Canada–United States border crossing

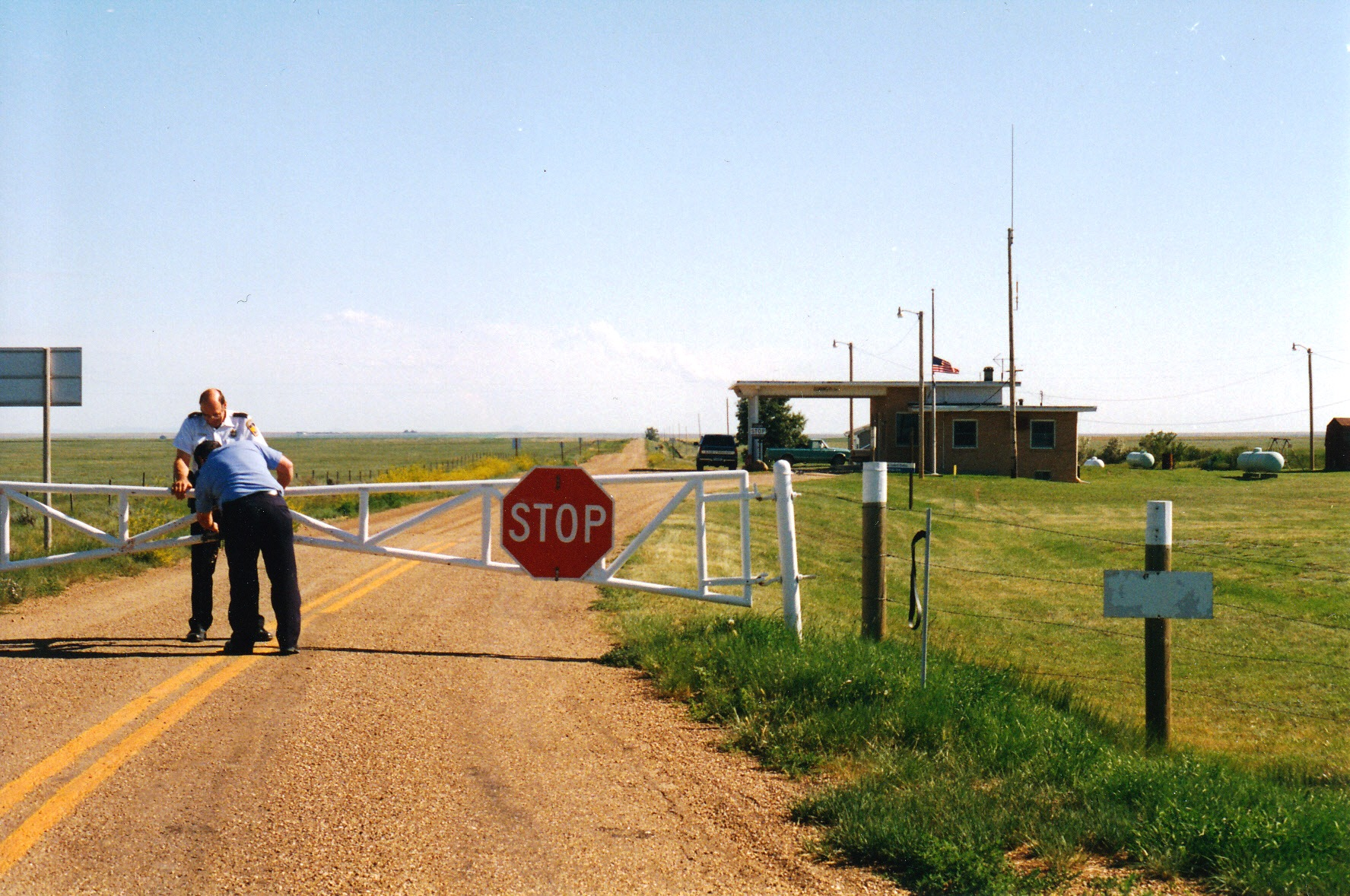
- US and Canada close the gate at the Willow Creek Border Crossing, as seen in 1997

Location
- Country: United States; Canada
- Location: S-233 / Highway 21; US Port: 29942 St Joe Road Havre, Montana 59501; Canadian Port: Highway 21 South, Willow Creek, Saskatchewan S0N 0P0
- Coordinates: 48.999974°N 109.731575°W

Details
- Opened: 1962

Website
- http://www.cbp.gov/contact/ports/willow-creek

The Willow Creek Border Crossing connects the cities of Havre, Montana and Govenlock, Saskatchewan on the Canada–United States border. It is reached by Montana Secondary Highway 233 on the American side and Saskatchewan Highway 21 on the Canadian side. Canada replaced its 1974 border station at this crossing with a modular unit in 2015. The US replaced its border inspection facilities in 2012. These facilities were originally built in 1962. Prior to that time, people entering the US at this location were expected to travel to Havre to report for inspection. The last 10 miles of the road between Havre and the Canada–US border were unpaved as recently as 2000. It is the westernmost border crossing in Saskatchewan.

== See also ==
- List of Canada–United States border crossings
