= Robsart, Saskatchewan =

Community in Saskatchewan, Canada

Robsart
- Unincorporated hamlet
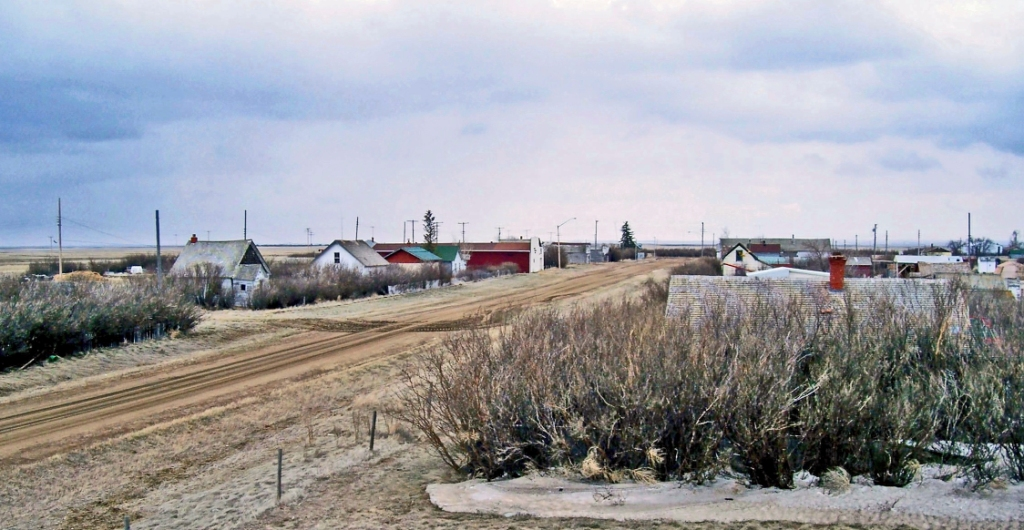
- Main Street, Robsart, 2007
- Motto: "A Town With a Bright Future" (1915)
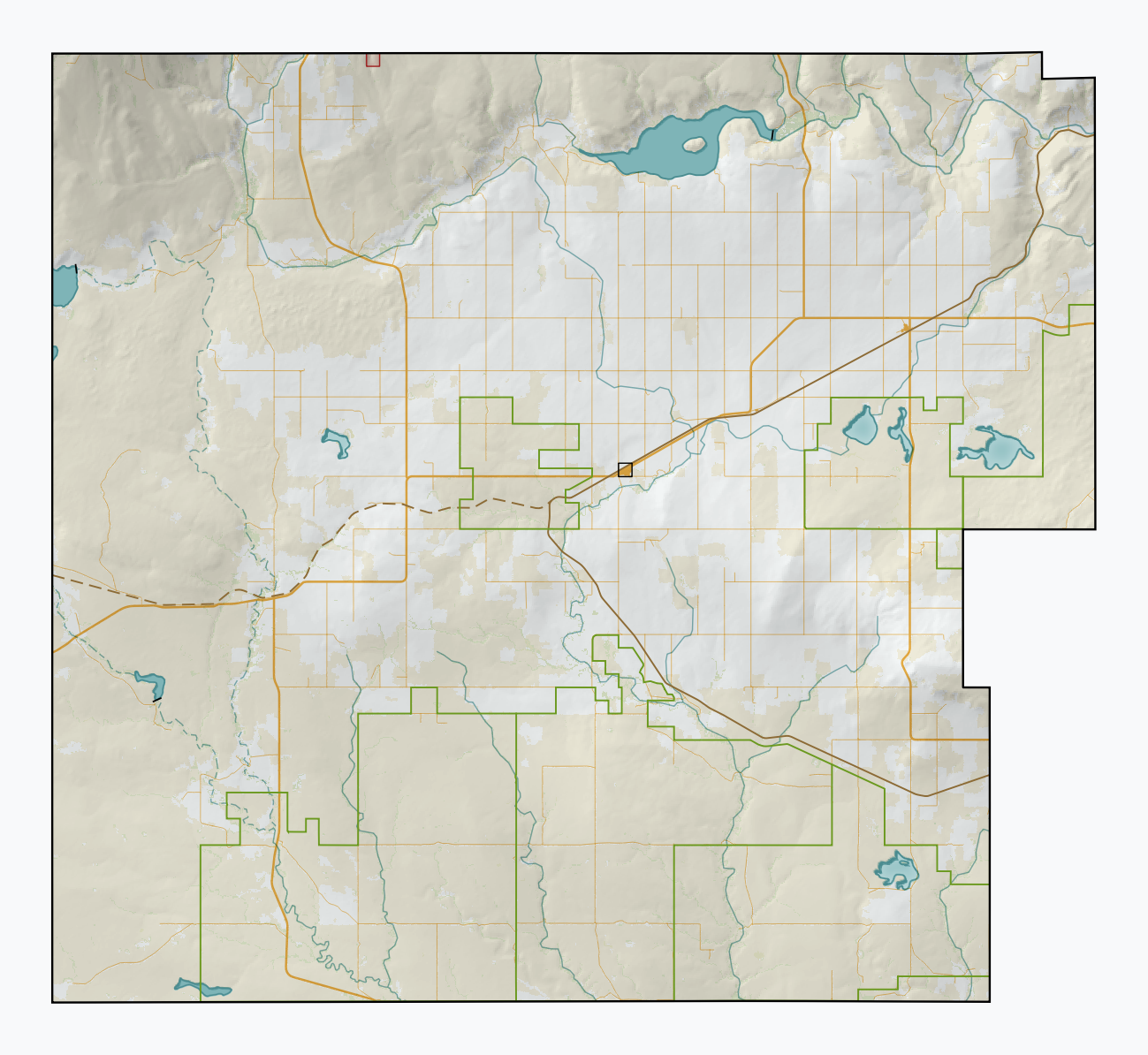
- Location within Reno No. 51 Location within Saskatchewan
- Coordinates: 49.3729°N 109.282°W
- Country: Canada
- Province: Saskatchewan
- Region: Southwest
- Rural municipality: Reno No. 51
- Established: 1910
- Incorporated (Village): 1912
- Dissolved (unincorporated): January 1, 2002

Government
  - Governing body: Reno No. 51
  - Reeve: Brian McMillan
  - Administrator: Lacelle Kim
  - MLA: Doug Steele
  - MP: Jeremy Patzer

Area
  - Total: 7.91 km^{2} (3.05 sq mi)

Population (2016)
  - Total: 20
  - Density: 11.7/km^{2} (30/sq mi)
- Time zone: UTC-6 (CST)
- Postal code: S0N 2G0
- Area code: 306
- Highways: Highway 13; Highway 18
- Railways: Great Western Railway

Robsart is an unincorporated hamlet within the Rural Municipality of Reno No. 51, in the Canadian province of Saskatchewan. Robsart had a population of 20 at the 2016 Canada Census (a 100% increase from 10 in the 2011 Canada Census). Robsart previously was incorporated as an independent village since 1912 until it was dissolved into an unincorporated community on January 1, 2002, under the jurisdiction of the rural municipality of Reno No. 51. Robsart is located 48 kilometres (30 mi) southwest of the town of Eastend at the junction of Highway 18 and Highway 13 (also known as the historic Red Coat Trail) approximately 170 kilometres (110 mi) south-east of Medicine Hat, Alberta, 68 kilometres (42 mi) south of the town of Maple Creek.

== History ==
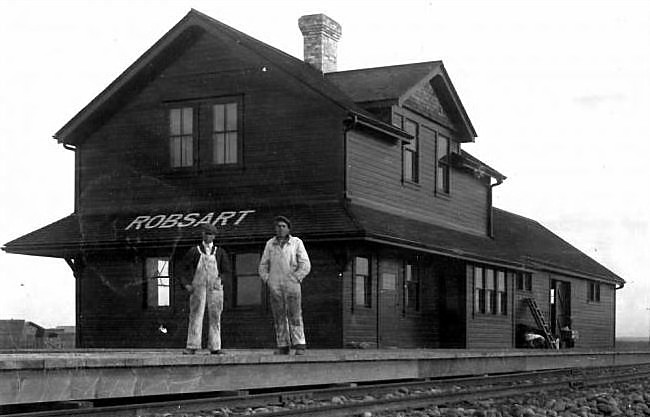
Canadian Pacific Railway Station after completion 1914

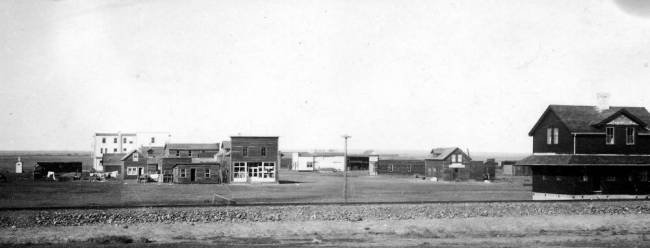
CPR station and business core 1914

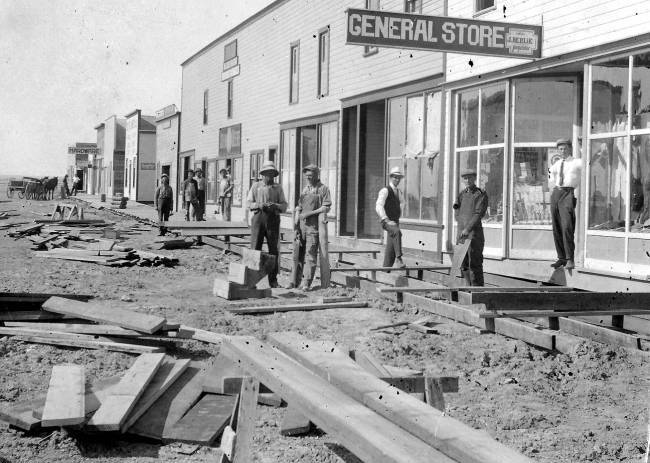
Installation of wood sidewalks 1915

Prior to January 1, 2002, Robsart was incorporated as a village, and was dissolved into an unincorporated community under the jurisdiction of the Rural Municipality of Reno on that date.

In 1910, Canadian Pacific Railway (CPR) purchased a quarter section of land in the southwest region of Saskatchewan and called it Robsart. The land was named after Amy Robsart, from the Sir Walter Scott book, Kenilworth. Three years later the land was bought by a man named Henry Abbott, who led the first settlers to the new community. Shortly after the settlers arrived, many businesses started to go up quickly. Two of the first businesses were a general store and feed mill, and soon 30 other businesses, including a dentist, jeweller, and a surgeon, arrived.

=== Boom years ===
When the CPR finished the construction of the Stirling-Weyburn line, a boom occurred, bringing in even more prosperity for the small community. Almost weekly new businesses were opening, bringing new hotels, cafés, churches, livery barns, a school, banks, grain elevators, and its own public hospital which opened its doors in 1917 and still stands today. Ten years after the town of Robsart was established it had a population of 350 residents, its own town hall, mayor, town council, and around more than 50 businesses. The town was so prosperous that one postcard with a picture of Robsart bore the ironic motto "A town with a bright future".

=== Great Depression ===
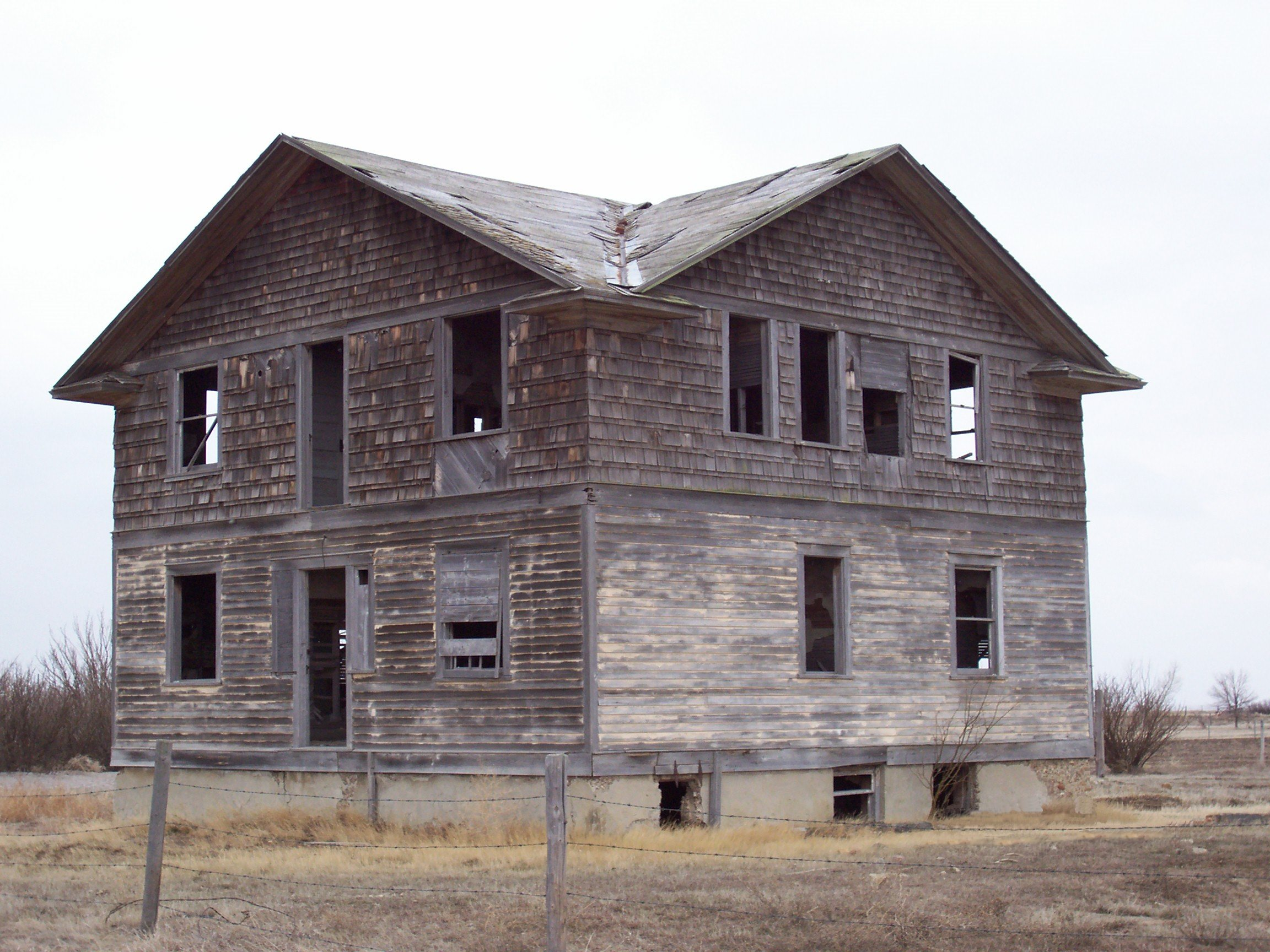
The former Robsart Public Hospital opened in 1918 and closed in the late 1930s

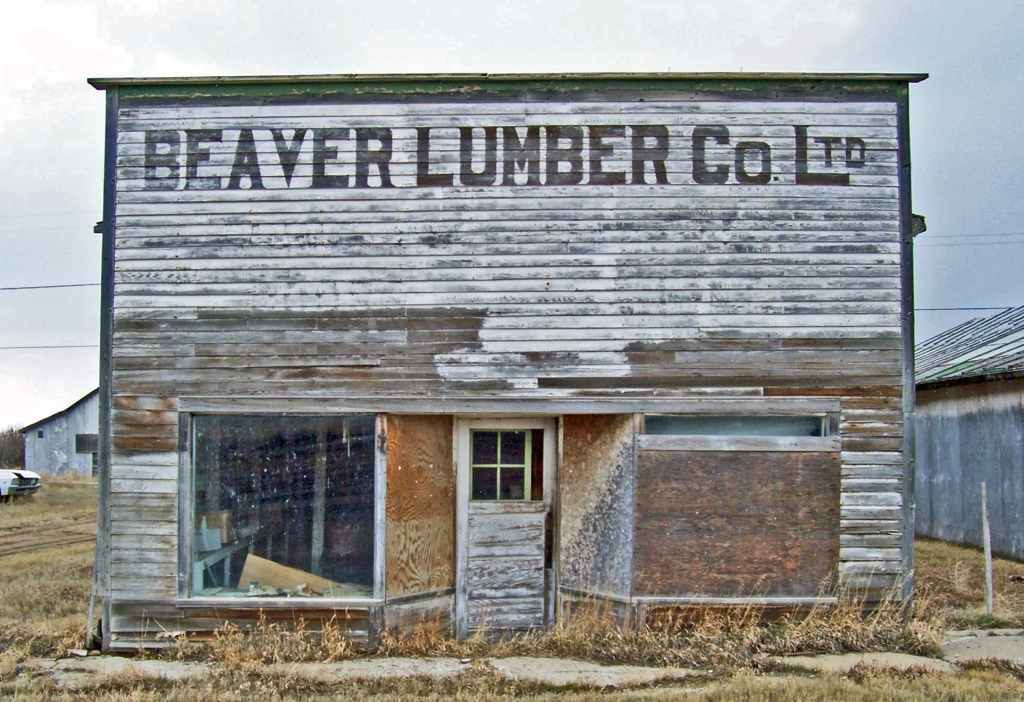
One of the remaining abandoned storefronts, from the once prosperous business section

In the late 1920s, Robsart's prosperous beginnings began a long decline. Starting with a grain elevator fire in 1929, one year later another blaze wiped out a large section of the business core. Next was the Great Depression, accompanying droughts, falling grain prices and poor crop yields, which caused further business closures in the once industrious business core. Many merchants were hit hard by crippling financial losses and had to leave in search for a better way of life. Since the beginning of the Great Depression the community has struggled but never with the same early pioneer optimism.

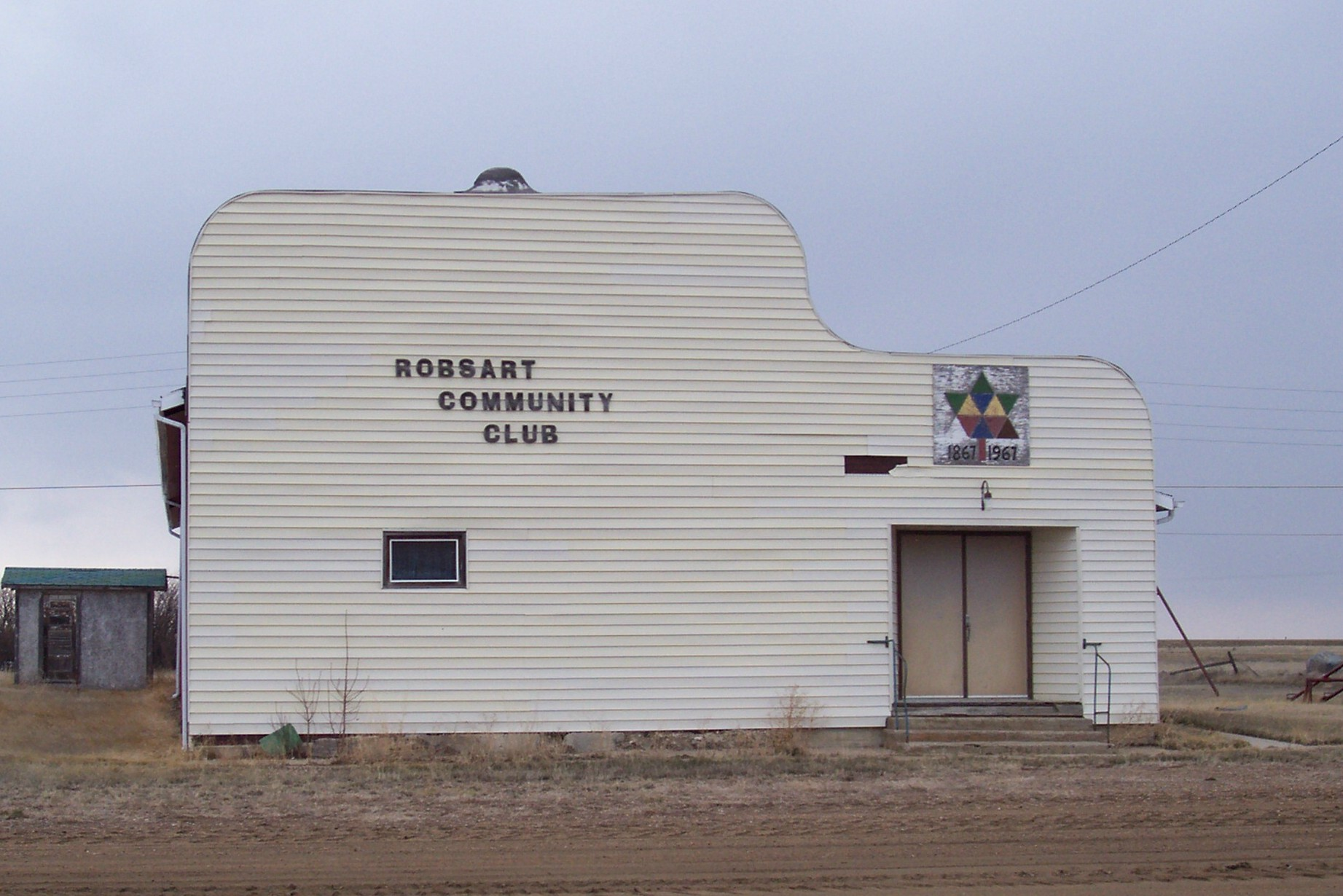
The Robsart Community Hall renovated in the 1980s by local residents and farmers now sits idle, used for special occasions

In the 1980s, locals and nearby farmers rallied together and renovated the old community hall in hopes of reviving the once thriving town, but one by one most remaining businesses and homes were boarded up, including Robsart's Saskatchewan Wheat Pool and Pioneer elevators which were demolished in 2000. Both had played a crucial role in the community over the years. Finally on January 1, 2002, due to dwindling population, the village of Robsart was dissolved, and is now governed by the RM of Reno No. 51.

=== Our Side of The Hills: community book ===
In the early 1990s, former and current residents of Robsart got together and made a community history book; Our Side of The Hills. Former mayor and resident Archie Smiley submitted a revised version of an old poem called "Ode to Robsart".

== Demographics ==
In the 2021 Census of Population conducted by Statistics Canada, Robsart had a population of 15 living in 5 of its 6 total private dwellings, a change of −25% from its 2016 population of 20. With a land area of 1.67 km^{2} (0.64 sq mi), it had a population density of 9.0/km^{2} (23.3/sq mi) in 2021.

Canada census – Robsart, Saskatchewan community profile

	2016	2011
Population	20 (+100.0% from 2011)	10 (-37.5% from 2006)
Land area	7.91 km^{2} (3.05 sq mi)	7.91 km^{2} (3.05 sq mi)
Population density	11.7/km^{2} (30/sq mi)	5.8/km^{2} (15/sq mi)
Median age
Private dwellings	4 (total)	8 (total)
Median household income

References: 2016 2011

== Infrastructure ==
- Great Western Railway, a Canadian short line railway company operating on former Canadian Pacific Railway trackage in southwest Saskatchewan.
- Highway 13 — the Red Coat Trail
- Highway 18

== Attractions ==
- Robsart Art Works, features Saskatchewan artists featuring photographers of old buildings and towns throughout Saskatchewan.
- Beaver lumber Co. Ltd., one of the last remaining original storefronts along Main Street
- Robsart Hospital, a former community hospital opened in 1918 which still stands today and is known as the only known pioneer hospital of its kind in Saskatchewan, if not Western Canada
- Robsart Community Hall, refinished in the 1980s by locals and farmers and still in use today for special occasions
- Robsart Community Curling Rink, no longer in use but still stands.
- Vidora Cafe, a former cafe saved from demolition and moved from Vidora to Robsart. The cafe is one of few buildings that originate from Vidora. Only two other buildings still stand on Vidora's original town site, old foundations and wooden sidewalks can still be seen when walking the streets of the former town site.

== Notable people ==
- Eiliv Anderson was a corporate executive with a degree from the executive program of Queen's University's School of Business

== See also ==
- List of communities in Saskatchewan
