= Ardwick, Saskatchewan =

Railway point in Saskatchewan, Canada

Coordinates: 49.380°N 106.001°W

Location of Ardwick in Saskatchewan

Ardwick is a railway point in the Canadian province of Saskatchewan. Ardwick was a station on the Canadian Pacific Railway where the Shaunavon and Fife Lake subdivisions met.
