= Red Coat Trail =

Highway in Alberta, Saskatchewan, Manitoba

Red Coat Trail

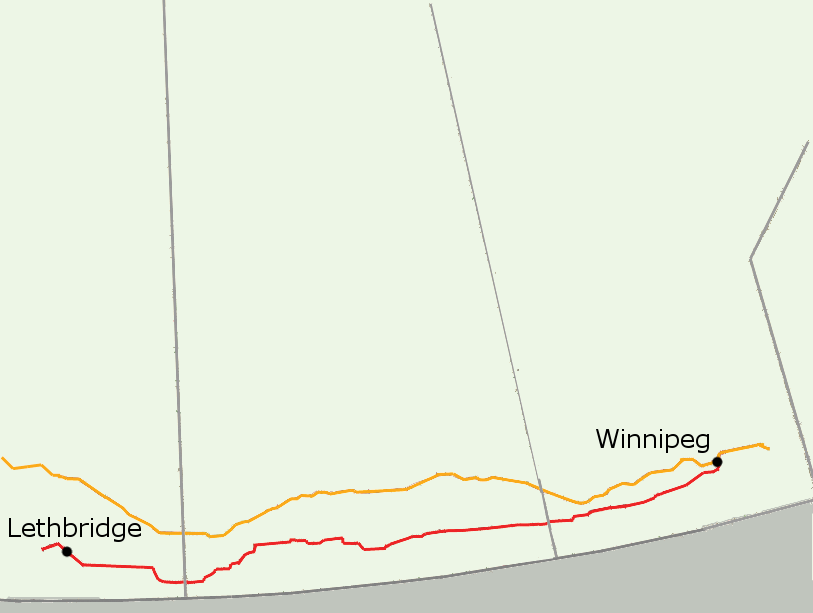
- Red Coat Trail marked in red and the Trans-Canada Highway marked in yellow

Route information
- Length: 1,280.1 km (795.4 mi)
- Component highways: AB 3, AB 4, AB 61, AB 889, AB 501, SK 13, MB 2

Major junctions
- West end: Highway 2 near Fort Macleod, AB
- Highway 5 in Lethbridge, AB; Highway 36 near Wrentham, AB; Highway 21 in Govenlock, SK; Highway 4 in Cadillac, SK; Highway 2 in Assiniboia, SK; Highway 6 near Pangman, SK; Highway 39 in Weyburn, SK; Highway 35 in Weyburn, SK; Highway 9 in Carlyle, SK; PTH 10 near Nesbitt, MB; PTH 5 in Glenboro, MB
- East end: PTH 100 near Winnipeg, MB

Location
- Country: Canada
- Provinces: Alberta, Saskatchewan, Manitoba

Highway system
- Alberta Provincial Highway Network; List; Former
- Provincial highways in Saskatchewan
- Provincial highways in Manitoba; Winnipeg City Routes

The Red Coat Trail is a 1,300-kilometre (810 mi) route in Canada that approximates the path taken in 1874 by the North-West Mounted Police in their March West from Fort Dufferin to Fort Whoop-Up.

== Route description ==
A number of highways in southern Manitoba, Saskatchewan, and Alberta roughly follow the original route.

In Alberta, the trail follows Highways 3, 4, 61, 889, and 501.

In Saskatchewan, Highway 13 is designated as Red Coat Trail. The travel corridor from the Manitoba–Saskatchewan border to Winnipeg follows Manitoba PTH 2. (Note: Winnipeg: Established 1738 as Fort Rouge; renamed 1822 Fort Garry; incorporated in 1873 as the City of Winnipeg.)

=== Alberta ===
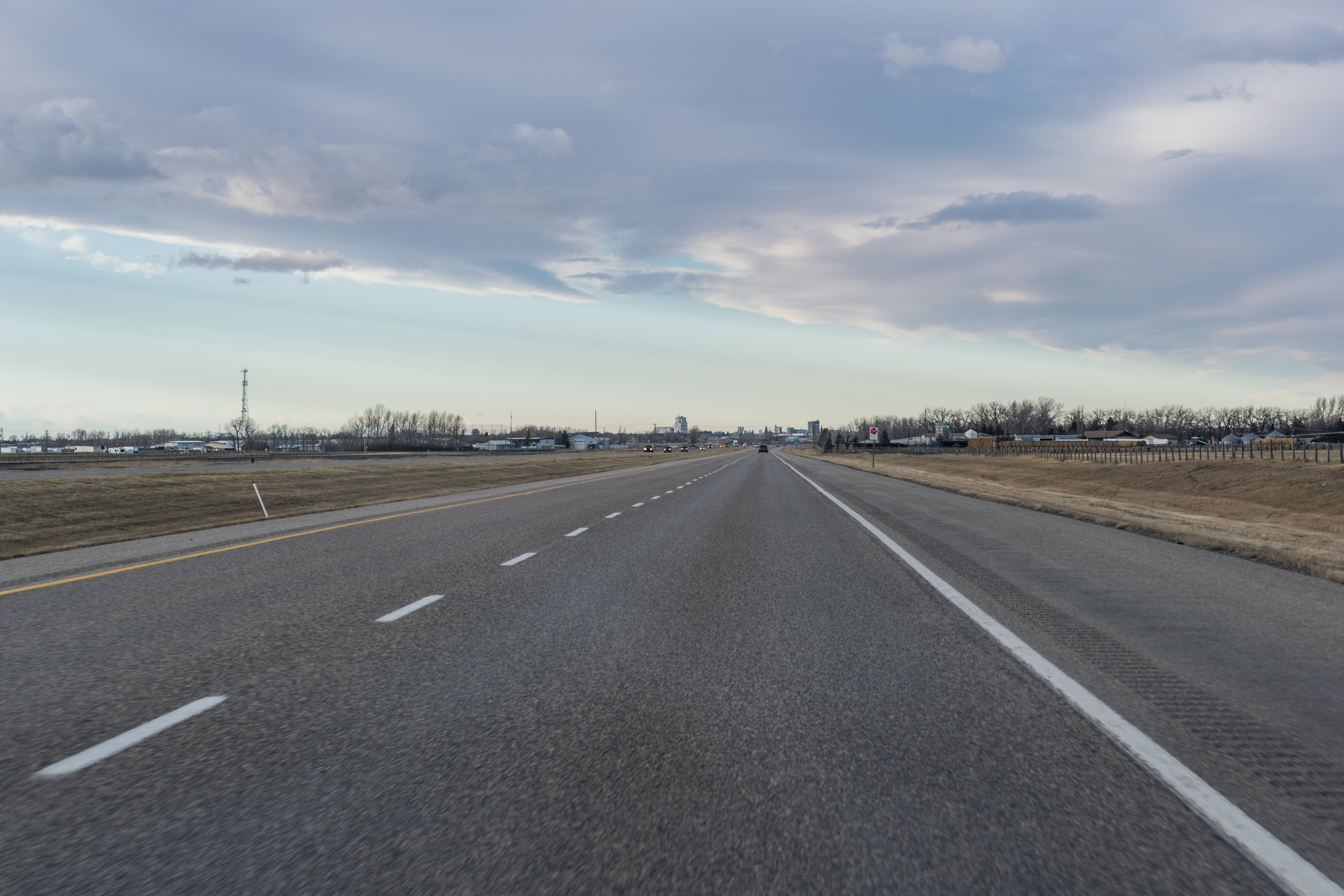
Highway 4 southeast of Lethbridge, Alberta

Near Fort Macleod, the traffic volume is between 4,200 and 7,900 vehicles per day (vpd) according to the 2007 Average Annual Daily Traffic report, which is quite consistent for the decade. The area is a short-grass prairie ecosystem with black soils and is conducive to grain growing. Located at the junction of Highway 2 and the Red Coat Trail, Fort Macleod as of 2021 has a population of over 3,000 residents Head-Smashed-In Buffalo Jump is a major attraction 20 mi (32 km) northwest of town. Between Fort Macleod, and Lethbridge, the Red Coat Trail runs concurrent with the Crowsnest Highway travelling through the Porcupine Hills, the Coyote Flats, and a ghost town named Pearce marked only by a railway crossing and a few farms. D.M. Wilson says, "beneath the Highway's pavement is perhaps 50 m (160 ft) of glacial till consisting of sand and gravel, clays, and boulder clays, humped into hills by the last continental glacier perhaps as it melted away to the northward some 11,000 years ago, overlaying some 10,000 ft (3,000 m) of sedimentary Púleozoic and Mesozoic strata which themselves rest on Precambrian granites. Beyond the low ridge on the far side of the cut-bank'd Oldman, an enormously rich bed of lacustrine loam began attracting settlers in the early 19-aughts and rewards so well still the agricultural efforts of their descendants....the hills are actually longitudinal dunes of loess picked up from a nearby lakebed..." The highway rises in elevation between the Oldman River and the Belly River watersheds and to the south of the highway is the Canadian Pacific Kansas City's Lethbridge Viaduct of 1909. The viaduct has a well-developed trail system through the river valley, and the Helen Schuler Coulee Centre and Galt Museum & Archives are located nearby. The Highway 3A alternate route carries traffic across the Oldman River on a 1997 four-lane road, which rerouted the highway from its old course over the 1957 narrow bridge. This area features a sandstone quarry which was used for construction projects as early as 1904 and a defunct community known as Nevarre changing names to Staunton. Highway 3A continues on to the village of Monarch, which is just north of the confluence of the Oldman River and Belly rivers and halfway between Fort Macleod and Lethbridge. North of Monarch on Highway 23 and west of the village, the traffic volume as of 2007 was around 500 AADT; however, following the Red Coat Trail into Lethbridge, the volume increases to over 5,000 vpd.

Between Monarch and Coalhurst, the Red Coat Trail is a twinned highway, and between Coalhurst, and Lethbridge a multilane divided highway. West of Coalhurst, traffic volume is about 15,000 vpd, and to the east rises to approximately 18,000 vpd. Oil, flax, wheat, and sugar beets are the staples of the agricultural economy supplemented by gas and oil in 1974 which replaced the sugar beet harvests. The city of Lethbridge, is at the junction of Highway 4, Highway 5 and Highway 3. Travel along the Red Coat Trail corridor leaves Highway 3 and continues on Highway 4 south east towards Stirling, with a traffic volume around 5,500 vpd. Whence at Stirling, the Red Coat Trail travel corridor leaves Highway 4 and continues east along Highway 61 towards the small hamlet of Wrentham at the junction of Highway 36. Between Stirling and Wrentham the traffic volume declines to an AADT of about 550 vpd on a secondary undivided paved highway. The Red Coat Trail runs parallel and north of the Etzikom Coulee and Crow Indian Lake and to the north of the Red Coat Trail are the Chin Lakes and the Chin Reservoir. Coulees are meltwater channels produced by glacier meltoff forming long river valleys. A number of these coulees are dry or almost dry, and some such as the Chin Lakes have been formed by the Chin Reservoir. The weather of southeast Alberta is warmer than the rest of the province, with lower annual precipitation creating a grassland ecoregion. At the junction of the Red Coat Trail and Highway 877 is the small hamlet of Skiff, population 10, with a declining AADT between 350 and 400 vpd. The village of Foremost is at the junction with Highway 879 near Forty Mile Park and Writing-on-Stone Provincial Park. Etzikom on the intersection of the Red Coat Trail and Highway 855 features the Etzikom Museum and the Canadian National Historical Windmill Centre. Orion, a small hamlet with a population of less than 10 residents, is at the intersection of Highway 887 and the Red Coat Trail. The traffic between Orion and the Saskatchewan border is very low, averaging between 70 and 100 vpd. Manyberries is at the eastern terminus of Highway 61. Travel on the Red Coat Trail continues south on Highway 889 a secondary connector road to meet with Highway 501, a secondary gravel highway to the Alberta–Saskatchewan border.

=== Saskatchewan ===
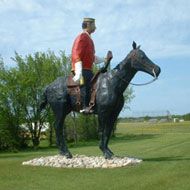
A Mountie statue in Redvers, Saskatchewan, commemorates the founding of the Red Coat Trail along Highway 13

There are 36 communities along the 676 km (420 mi) of the Saskatchewan portion of the Red Coat Trail which would be one approximately every 20 km (12 mi) apart, and there are 59 at grade intersections with primary and secondary highways which would be a junction approximately every 10 km (6.2 mi). The highway volume beginning in Saskatchewan along the Red Coat Trail about 45 vpd on a class 4 gravel highway.

Highway 615 provides access north to Fort Walsh National Historic Park and the highest point of land in Saskatchewan. Travel is mainly east through the province of Saskatchewan on the Red Coat Trail which is continuous on Highway 13 which is a secondary paved undivided highway until Weyburn. It is at the Consul intersection of highways that the Red Coat Trail changes to a thin membrane surface undivided highway where the traffic volume increases to about 80 vpd. Travel continues north east until the junction with Highway 21 which provides access to Cypress Hills Provincial Park and Maple Creek. The Red Coat Trail continues east after this intersection on a class 3 granular pavement highway and traffic here increases to an AADT of 270 vpd. There is a junction with Highway 18 before the highway turns north again to arrive at the intersection of Highway 614 and the town of Eastend, which has the nickname Dino Country where a Tyrannosaurus rex was discovered spawning the T. rex Discovery Centre. A number of ancient fauna paleontological dig sites exist in southern Saskatchewan.

This area of the Red Coat Trail receives an increase of traffic wherein about 300 vpd travel the Red Coat Trail east of Eastend and over 650 vpd east of town resulting in an upgrade to asphalt concrete road construction. The traffic volume entering Shaunavon is about 600 vpd, and the AADT increases to over 1,000 vpd heading north on the Highway 37 and Red Coat Trail concurrency. Highway 37 provides access to the town of Gull Lake and in 9.4 km (5.8 mi), the Red Coat Trail turns east on a thin membrane surface class 2 highway bearing between 150 and 250 vpd. The Red Coat Trail is upgraded to a class 5 granular pavement as traffic can reach a high of 530 vpd east of this Highway 4 intersection. To the northwest of the Highway 58 junction is Thomson Lake, which is a man-made lake used for recreational and reservoir purposes becoming the first regional park of Saskatchewan. Lafleche at the junction with Highway 58, and east of this junction the AADT increases to over 600 vpd. The Louis Pierre Gravel National Historic Marker commemorates history at the north end of Highway 58, and the Cripple Creek Provincial Historic Marker is at the junction with the Red Coat Trail (the southern terminus of Highway 58).

The terrain of the Missouri Coteau features low hummocky, undulating, rolling hills, potholes, and grasslands. This physiographic region of Saskatchewan is the uplands Missouri Coteau, a part of the Great Plains Province or Alberta Plateau Region, which extends across the southeast corner of Saskatchewan. Highway 2 and Highway 717 come together at the town of Assinibioia. Just to the west of Assiniboia the traffic volume increases to about 1,000 vpd and to the east of town, the volume decreases to about 800 vpd and the majority of the highway is class 3 granular pavement.

The intersection with Highway 621 north is passed before arriving at the city of Weyburn which is on the intersection of Highway 35, Highway 39, the CanAm Highway. Weyburn, the opportunity city, has also been dubbed the Soo Line City due its connection with Chicago on the Soo Line Railroad, a subsidiary of the Canadian Pacific Railway (CPR). The city of 9,433 people is on Highway 35, Highway 39, and Highway 13. absorbed the small towns of Exon and Converge into the city. Weyburn is located astride the Williston geological Basin which contains oil deposits, and several wells operate in the vicinity. There are roadside attractions featured here such as a large Lighthouse water tower, wheat sheaves and Prairie Lily. Weyburn is near the upper delta of the 470-mile-long (760 km) Souris River. The Souris River continues south-east through North Dakota eventually meeting the Assiniboine River in Manitoba.

The Red Coat Trail is primarily asphalt concrete between Highway 6 and Highway 47 where traffic volume reaches about 1,450 vpd east of Weyburn, and over 3,500 vpd within the city on this class 2 highway. There is a short stretch of granular pavement before Highway 9 where the traffic volume falls to about 1,700 vpd, rising to about 2,400 vpd near Carlyle.

The town of Carlyle is at the intersection with Highway 9, which provides access north to Moose Mountain Provincial Park and Cannington Manor Provincial Historic Park. Before the Manitoba border, the Red Coat Trail is granular pavement with traffic volume below 1,000 vpd. Manor on Highway 603, Antler River, Wauchope on Highway 601, Redvers on Highway 8, Gainsborough Creek, and finally Antler on Highway 600 are the last localities in Saskatchewan before Manitoba.

=== Manitoba ===
In Manitoba 19 communities populate the Red Coat Trail between the Saskatchewan border and Winnipeg. There are also 33 at grade intersections with numbered provincial highways and roads on this 349.2 km (217.0 mi) portion of the Red Coat Trail in Manitoba. The actual route taken by the North-West Mounted Police in 1874 was some hundred kilometres south of the "Red Coat Trail", designated by the tourism industry. This is a problem faced by many scenic and historic routes, purporting to take motorists on a historic route. The Manitoba government does not recognize the designation of "Red Coat Trail".

== History ==
Alternate shield

Early travellers had two rivers to ford without bridge or ferry between Fort Macleod and Coal Banks, one at Monarch and the other at Coal Banks. (Note: Lethbridge post office was so named in 1885, previously named Coal Banks or Coalbanks. Lethbridge also had other names such as steep banks, the place of black rocks, painted rock, red painted rock, medicine stone, where they slaughtered the Cree, the coal Bank, and Sheran's Ferry crossing amongst others.) Pioneers travelled the pioneer trails across the grasslands during the 19th century created by travellers, first nations and fur traders. The grasslands area of today was still forested in the 19th century and land would need to be cleared and broken for agricultural homesteads and roads. In the 19th century southern Saskatchewan was known as an extension of the Greater Yellow Grass Marsh. The Dominion Land Surveyors marked the quarter sections of Manitoba in 1874–1875 and of Saskatchewan in 1881 and homesteaders began tilling their homesteads and fencing their quarter-sections. Travel transferred from prairie trail to road allowances set by the surveyors. Rural municipalities set road bosses and crews to grade the roads and to fill in the low areas. Walking ploughs would till the soil that was to be moved by the fresnoes, which was a scraper pulled with two horses. Those who worked on roads would have lowered taxes. Later crews would work with four-horse scrapers followed by crawler tractors which could pull even larger graders and scrapers. The rural municipality would work out a system of road work for the various ratepayers, and pathmasters or road crew foremen were appointed to oversee the statute labour conducted. Road sections were constructed from one stopping place to the next, where a stopping place was a settler's home who had built additional accommodation for travellers. Ferries were primarily used to cross rivers and creeks, and these often afforded stopping places. Approximately 1890 the piers were set for the first highway bridge across the Belly River. (Note: The current name for the Belly River is the Oldman River) The first car in Alberta was owned by F.W. Cochrane of Macleod in 1901. These first electric and steam driven cars were set with a high clearance and were able to travel a prairie trail and follow in ruts, soon cars were gasoline powered.

Lethbridge was subject to flooding in the early 20th century, the years 1902, 1907, and 1908, uplifting houses, barns, bridges, and trees. During the May 1902 flooding a house floating in the river removed the east span of the bridge which was under repair when the June 1902 flood removed the centre span of the bridge. The Territorial Department of Public Works decided upon a steel bridge set upon concrete piers and received a $50,000 grant for construction from the Dominion Government. The floor of the bridge was wood planking across the 16-foot-wide (4.9 m) bridge. To the south of the Red Coat Trail is the Canadian Pacific Kansas City trestle bridge or the Lethbridge Viaduct. This 576-metre-long (1,891 ft), 46-metre-high (150 ft) trestle bridge across the Oldman River was constructed between 1908 and 1909. In 1910, the Lethbridge Board of Trade was claiming that the government maintains the main roads and bridges and that the roads were good with few hills. The speed limit of this era for automobiles was 40 km/h (25 mph), yet settlers still used horse and automobile for transport. In 1910, travel across the prairies was by rail, of which there were five branches of rail line branching out from Lethbridge, a divisional and terminal point. The Weyburn branch of the Canadian Pacific Railway was under construction in 1910 as well, which eventually connected Winnipeg and Lethbridge. In 1910, taxes were set at six and a quarter cents per acre, and homesteaders could work on the road crew to help with this payment. A driver and one team of horses could earn C$5.00 per day, and a driver with two teams of horses could earn $7.00 for a day's labour, where a day would be nine hours in duration. It was not until 1912 that the Board of Highway Commissioners was created to authorise road grants for improvements.

One of the first traffic bridges across the Oldman River near Monarch, Alberta, was erected in 1913. Red shale can still be seen of the Taylor coal mine (1916–1925) constructed in the upper river bank north of the Lethbridge traffic bridge. By the early 1920s most residents had cars for transport. In the 1920s roads were gravelled, gravel loaded by shovel, and hauled with horse and wagon, so that automobiles would not become mired down in mud in the low-lying areas. However, the gravel was too thick, and loose gravel meant horses needed to be shod and cars would careen wildly over the road, and so therefore the grass trail alongside the road was used instead. The Department of Public Works fixed this problem by mixing clay with the gravel. This era was followed by four-horse teams pulling a sulky plough across the roads, eliminating ruts and forming a hard and level surface to drive upon. The 1920s were indeed years of road work; however in these pioneering days there was little background or guidelines to go by. Early road work consisted of levelling roads and filling in low spots which would collect water to make travel easier by the first automobiles. Road ways and road allowances could either be purchased or leased from the homesteader who was proving up that farmland. A challenge to rural municipality councillors was the removal of rocks from the road allowance.

Government grants were set out for road construction where the ratepayers of the rural municipality came together in road camps for improvements and there were also Road Day Competitions held. The road would divert around sloughs, hills, and other diversions to make the travel easier for horse and cart. In 1921 Highway 13 was graded up through the low areas around the Carlyle area. A foreman could earn between $6.00 and $7.00 for a day, a graderman could earn between $4.50 and $5.00 per day, labourers in 1921 would earn $4.00 to $4.50 per day. A driver of a single team of horses could earn between $7.50 and $8.80 per day, and a driver with a double team of horses could earn up to $10.00 to $10.50 in a day. The Relief Roadwork Program of 1928 which initiated roadwork on Highway 13. Those local residents with four horses and a grader initially maintained the highway. During the depression years of the dirty thirties, roadwork continued and the highways were widened, gravelled and paved. Gravel was laid on highways in the early 1930s which alleviated being mired in the mud during rainy weather; however during dry weather, gravel roads produced great quantities of dust, reducing visibility. In 1930, the Manitoba provincial government constructed Highway 2 with hard surfacing to follow. Road crew wages changed to hourly in 1932, where a foreman of a road crew could now earn 35 cents an hour, a man with a two-horse team 45 to 50 cents an hour and a driver with four horses could earn 65 to 70 cents an hour, and labourers could now bring in 25 cents an hour.

In Saskatchewan, Carlyle was established for example as the area headquarters which supervised six Department of Highway road crews along Highway 13. The crews would remove snow and ice during winter months, and during the summer months conduct road allowance mowing, ensure drainage, attend to sign and guard rail repair. During the 1940s Pearce, Alberta, was home to a CPR station, village, and the British Commonwealth Air Training Program featuring the No. 36 Elementary Flying School. In 1943, tractor operator scrapers termed tumble bugs, were available to rural municipalities. After World War II, rural municipalities equipment such as crawler tractors, scrapers, and graders could be purchased. As of 1949 the early steel bridge across the Oldman River in Lethbridge was replaced. Winter still proved a challenge in the 1950s and roads could be blocked. Bombardiers, and early passenger ski doo could be employed for emergency transportation. In 1952, a general standard was established wherein the provincial government paid 60% and the rural municipalities the remainder for road planning and improvements. Bridges over 100 ft (30 m) in length would be paid entirely by the province; shorter bridge costs would be jointly shared. MB Hwy 2 was constructed to the modern highway able to carry high-speed vehicles, and steel culverts have replaced the early wooded bridges.

A very narrow traffic bridge was constructed in 1957 across the Oldman near Monarch, Alberta, replacing the 1913 predecessor, and currently gives a route to cyclists while the truckers and vehicular traffic currently use the new four-lane bridge. It wasn't until the 1960s that these gravel highways were oiled to reduce the dust clouds; however these oiled surfaces could not bear heavy loads of commercial traffic. In 1968, the Department of Highways was established in the town of Cadillac. During the 1970s, the Highway 13 was extended between Eastend and the Alberta border as part of the Red River Trail corridor. It was also in the 1970s that the highway was paved to withstand heavy loads as potash was being mined in Esterhazy and the oil highways were breaking under the added weight. "Extensive flood control programs have created reservoirs, parks and waterfowl centres along the Souris River." near Weyburn, Saskatchewan. Between 1988 and 1995, the Rafferty-Alameda Project was constructed to alleviate spring flooding problems created by the Souris River. The Red Coat Trail travels across the Oldman River near Monarch Alberta on a pre-stressed four-lane concrete bridge which was completed in 1997. "Highway 13, also known as the Red Coat Trail, has seen a significant amount of upgrading in recent years. The transformation of this highway between the Manitoba border and Cadillac, Saskatchewan, from a thin membrane surface (TMS) to a paved standard is nearing completion. In the 2004 construction season, 39 km (24 mi) will be improved; in 2003 almost 70 km (43 mi)was upgraded or resurfaced; and in the 2002 construction season 70 km (43 mi) of Highway 13 was upgraded or resurfaced."

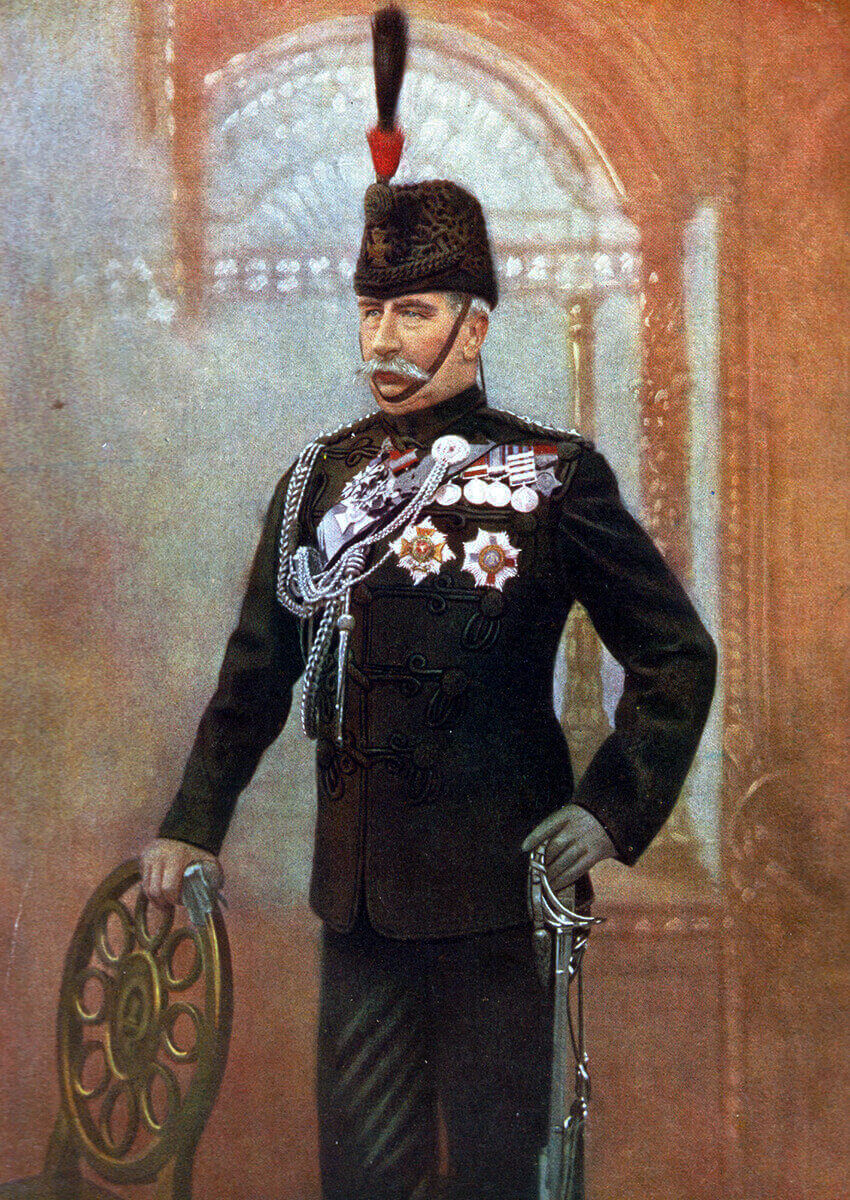
Sir Redvers Buller

Sir John A. Macdonald read the bill to create the North-West Mounted Police in 1873, which was passed in May of that year. Recruitment of men for the police force began in September 1873 and they assembled at Fort Dufferin, Manitoba. (Note: Fort Dufferin, Manitoba, is now at the location of Emerson, Manitoba) The border between the United States and Canada was surveyed in 1872. On July 8, 1874, these trained men were despatched on their western journey. There is a museum and the 1884 NWMP Barracks Site at Fort Macleod which preserves the NWMP history at the Fort, supplemented by a RCMP musical ride which is held yearly in commemoration. Healy and Hamilton built Fort Whoop Up 8 mi (13 km) from the current location of Lethbridge near the confluence of the St. Mary and Belly Rivers. Today the location of Fort Whoop Up is signified by a historical cairn marker. Colonel Macleod of the Royal Northwest Mounted Police (RNWMP) presented Healy and Hamilton with an offer to purchase Fort Whoop Up which they declined. (Note: The Royal Canadian Mounted Police (RCMP) was formed in 1920 by the merger of the Royal Northwest Mounted Police (RNWMP, founded 1873) with the Dominion Police (founded 1868). The North-West Mounted Police became the Royal Northwest Mounted Police after 1904.) RNWMP were established at Coal Banks in 1885 forming K Division under the command of Superintendent A.R. McDonnell. This site in the Porcupine Hills was the coal mining site of Lethbridge. The Red Coats of 1874 had the option to settle on ranches following their three-year term with the RNWMP. Grasslands National Park near Ponteix, Saskatchewan, features NWMP trail markers amidst the Killdeer Badlands. Wood Mountain Post was established in 1874 to reduce cattle rustling and whisky trading. It was completed post haste though the NWMP post later closed in 1875.

Following his victory against the U.S. cavalry in the 1876 Battle of the Little Bighorn, Sitting Bull and about 5,000 of his followers sought sanctuary in the Wood Mountain area. Superintendent James Walsh from Fort Walsh left the Cypress Hills area to talk to Sitting Bull. Twenty-two NWMP police officers accompanied by Walsh set up a new Wood Mountain detachment and Walsh remained there with the men until his transfer to Fort Qu'Appelle in 1880. The Hudson's Bay Trading Post site was replaced with Chapel Coulee, Metis village of Chapel Coulee, which was later where the NWMP established a post in 1879 and small detachment from Fort Walsh. In 1887, the detachment moved to the banks of the White Mud River the current location of Eastend, Saskatchewan, as many of their concernts were alleviated, the whisky trade had ceased, the North-West Rebellion of 1885 was over, and Sitting Bull, a Hunkpapa Lakota Sioux holy man surrendered to American forces and returned to the United States in 1881. (Note: The White Mud River is currently known as the Frenchman River) The town of Redvers, Saskatchewan, along the Red Coat Trail, is named after General Sir Redvers Henry Buller VC GCB GCMG (1839–1908). The Boundary Commission Trail is an earlier route used from Winnipeg for travel east.

== Major intersections ==
From west to east:

Province	Location	km	mi	Destinations	Notes
Alberta	Fort Macleod	0.0	0.0	Highway 3 west (Crowsnest Highway) – Pincher Creek, Crowsnest Pass; Highway 2 – Cardston, Calgary	Red Coat Trail western terminus; follows Hwy 3 east
Alberta		21.2	13.2	Highway 3A east to Highway 23 north – Monarch, Vulcan	Eastbound access to Hwy 23
Alberta	Monarch	26.5	16.5	Highway 3A west / Highway 23 north – Vulcan, Calgary	Westbound exit, eastbound entrance
Alberta	Lethbridge	42.5	26.4	Highway 25 north – West Lethbridge, Picture Butte	
Alberta	Lethbridge	45.7	28.4	Highway 3 east (Crowsnest Trail / Crowsnest Highway) – Medicine Hat To Highway 4 / Highway 5 (1 Avenue S / Scenic Drive)	East end of Hwy 3 designation; former Hwy 4 through downtown Lethbridge
Alberta	Lethbridge	53.2	33.1	Highway 5 (Mayor Magrath Drive) – Cardston	
Alberta	Lethbridge	53.6	33.3	Highway 4 north (43 Street) to Highway 3	West end of Hwy 4 designation
Alberta	Stirling	78.9	49.0	Highway 4 south – Coutts, U.S. Border, Great Falls	East end of Hwy 4 designation; Hwy 61 western terminus
Alberta	Wrentham	102.4	63.6	Highway 36 – Taber, Warner	
Alberta	Manyberries	225.7	140.2	Highway 889 north – Medicine Hat	Hwy 61 eastern terminus; north end of Hwy 889 designation
Alberta		240.6	149.5	Highway 501 west – Milk River	Hwy 889 southern terminus; west end of Hwy 501 designation
Alberta		272.9	169.6	Highway 41 – Medicine Hat, U.S. border, Havre	
Alberta – Saskatchewan border		291.3	181.0	Highway 501 eastern terminus • Highway 13 western terminus	
Saskatchewan	Govenlock	305.8	190.0	Highway 21 south – U.S. border (Port of Willow Creek)	West end of Hwy 21 concurrency
Saskatchewan		349.7	217.3	Highway 21 north – Cypress Hills Interprovincial Park, Maple Creek	East end of Hwy 21 concurrency
Saskatchewan	Robsart	356.2	221.3	Highway 18 east – Frontier, Climax	
Saskatchewan	Shaunavon	437.4	271.8	Highway 37 south – Climax	West end of Hwy 37 concurrency
Saskatchewan		446.8	277.6	Highway 37 north – Gull Lake	East end of Hwy 37 concurrency
Saskatchewan	Cadillac	495.9	308.1	Highway 4 – Swift Current, Val Marie, U.S. border (Port of Monchy)	
Saskatchewan		549.1	341.2	Highway 19 south – Mankota	West end of Hwy 19 concurrency
Saskatchewan	Kincaid	550.3	341.9	Highway 19 north – Hodgeville	East end of Hwy 19 concurrency
Saskatchewan		580.8	360.9	Highway 58 south – Fir Mountain	East end of Hwy 58 concurrency
Saskatchewan	Lafleche	582.5	361.9	Highway 58 north – Gravelbourg	West end of Hwy 58 concurrency
Saskatchewan	Assiniboia	624.9	388.3	Highway 2 north – Moose Jaw	West end of Hwy 2 concurrency
Saskatchewan	Assiniboia	626.3	389.2	Highway 2 south (Centre Street) – U.S. border (Port of West Poplar River)	East end of Hwy 2 concurrency
Saskatchewan		653.7	406.2	Highway 36 south – Willow Bunch	West end of Hwy 36 concurrency
Saskatchewan		663.4	412.2	Highway 36 north – Crane Valley, Moose Jaw	East end of Hwy 36 concurrency
Saskatchewan		693.8	431.1	Highway 34 south – Bengough; Highway 334 north – Avonlea	
Saskatchewan		733.5	455.8	Highway 6 – Regina, U.S. border (Port of Regway)	
Saskatchewan		756.3	469.9	Highway 28 south – Radville	
Saskatchewan	Weyburn	786.0	488.4	Highway 39 – Moose Jaw, Regina, Estevan	
Saskatchewan	Weyburn	788.4	489.9	Highway 35 (King Street / Government Road) – Francis, U.S. border (Port of Oungre)	
Saskatchewan	Stoughton	848.7	527.4	Highway 47 – Grenfell, Estevan; To Highway 33 west – Francis, Regina	
Saskatchewan	Carlyle	903.0	561.1	Highway 9 north – Whitewood, Yorkton	West end of Hwy 9 concurrency
Saskatchewan	Carlyle	904.7	562.2	Highway 9 south – Oxbow	East end of Hwy 9 concurrency
Saskatchewan	Redvers	946.9	588.4	Highway 8 – Moosomin, Carievale	
Saskatchewan – Manitoba border		966.6	600.6	Highway 13 eastern terminus • PTH 2 western terminus	
Manitoba	Pipestone	1,000.7	621.8	PTH 83 – Virden, Melita	
Manitoba		1,032.3	641.4	PTH 21 south – Hartney	West end of PTH 21 concurrency
Manitoba		1,040.4	646.5	PTH 21 north – Griswold	East end of PTH 21 concurrency
Manitoba	Souris	1,055.2	655.7	PTH 22 south – Elgin	
Manitoba		1,076.6	669.0	PTH 10 north – Brandon	West end of PTH 10 concurrency
Manitoba		1,080.9	671.6	PTH 10 south – Boissevain	East end of PTH 10 concurrency
Manitoba		1,106.2	687.4	PTH 18 south – Killarney	
Manitoba	Glenboro	1,131.6	703.1	PTH 5 – Carberry, Baldur, Cartwright	
Manitoba	Holland	1,162.0	722.0	PTH 34 – Austin, Pilot Mound	
Manitoba	Elm Creek	1,226.9	762.4	PTH 13 – Oakville, Carman	
Manitoba	Oak Bluff	1,278.4	794.4	PTH 3 to PTH 100 west / Route 155 east – Winnipeg, Carman	
Manitoba	Oak Bluff	1,280.1	795.4	PTH 100 (TCH) east (Perimeter Highway) – Winnipeg, Kenora	No left turn eastbound
1.000 mi = 1.609 km; 1.000 km = 0.621 mi: Concurrency terminus; Incomplete access; Route transition

== See also ==
- Boundary Commission Trail

== Extra reading ==
- Bachusky, Johnnie (2003). Ghost Town Stories II: From Renegade to Ruin Along the Red Coat Trail. Altitude Publishing Canada Limited. ISBN 978-1551539928.
- Bachusky, Johnnie (2003). Ghost Town Stories from the Red Coat Trail. Altitude Publishing Canada Limited. ISBN 9781551539577.
- Red Coat Trail Highway Association (1990). The Thin Red Line: Your Guide to Travelling the Red Coat Trail. Red Coat Trail Highway Association.
- Lalonde, Meika (1998). Discover Saskatchewan: A Guide to Historic Sites (Digitized 25 Sep 2005). Elton LaClare, University of Regina, Ralph Nilson. . Canadian Plains Research Center. ISBN 9780889770959.
- Woodall's North American Campground Directory, 2003. Woodall Publications Staff, Family Campers & RVers, Woodall Publications, Corp., Family Motorcoach Association, Woodall Publishing Company. Woodall Publishing Company. 2002. ISBN 9780762724086.
- Schulte-Peevers, Andrea (2005). Canada (Digitized online by Google Books) (9, illustrated ed.). Lonely Planet. p. 560. ISBN 9781740597739.
- Kreuzer, Terese Loeb (2006). How to Move to Canada: A Primer for Americans (Digitized online by Google Books). Carol Bennett (9, illustrated ed.). St. Martin's Press. ISBN 9780312349868.
- Brown, Tricia (2005). The World-Famous Alaska Highway: A Guide to the Alcan & Other Wilderness Roads of the North (Digitized online by Google Books) (2, illustrated ed.). Graphic Arts Center Publishing Co. pp. 46–52. ISBN 9780882406022.
- Coronach Community Profile. Red Coat Trail Highway Association. Red Coat Trail Highway Association. 1982.
- Memories....Are Forever. Manor and District Historical Society, Manor History Book Committee. Archived from the original on June 15, 2011.
