= Khedive, Saskatchewan =

Community in Saskatchewan, Canada

Khedive
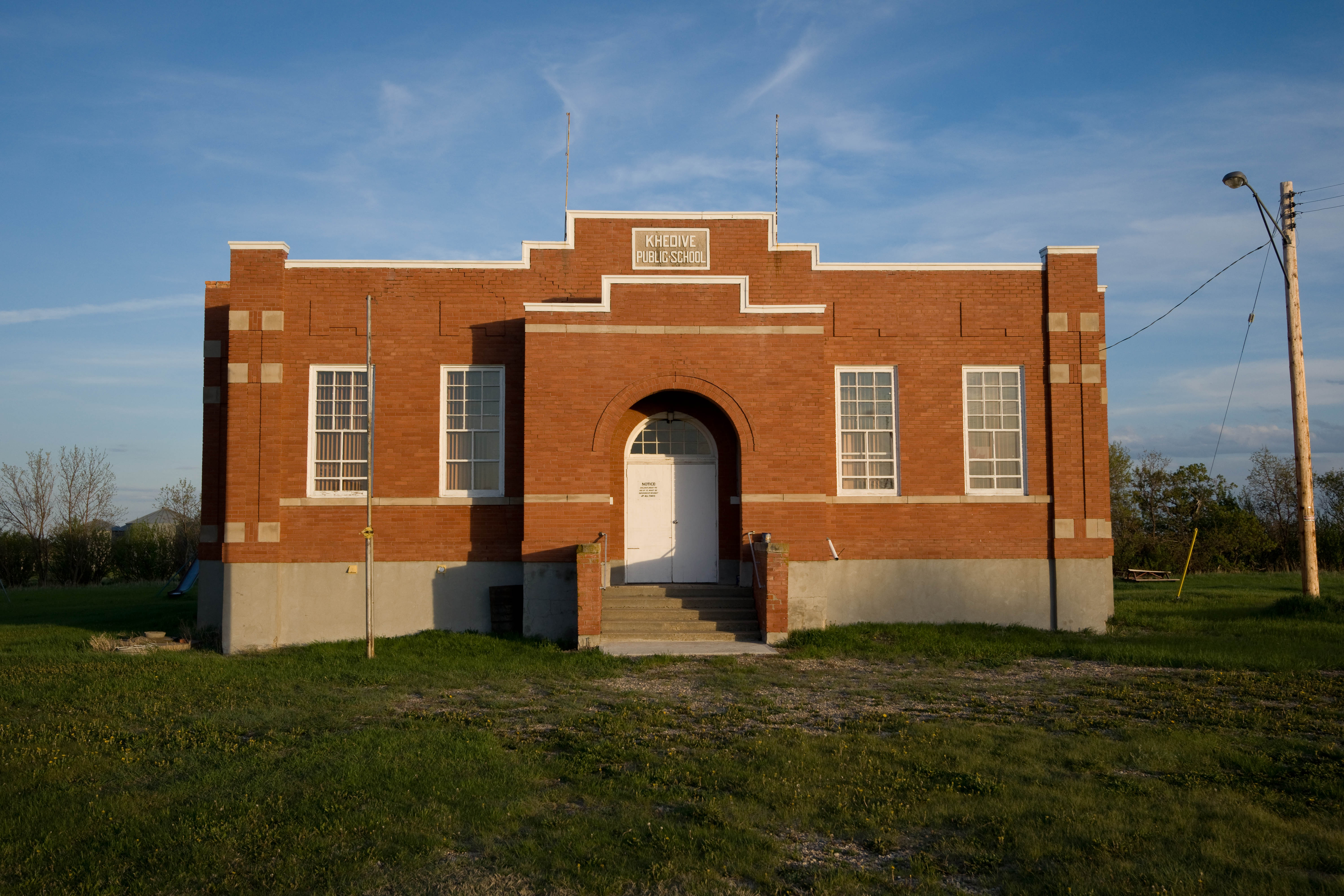
- Khedive School

- Location within Saskatchewan Location within Canada
- Coordinates: 49°37′19.43″N 104°37′47.07″W
- Country: Canada
- Province: Saskatchewan
- Census division: 2
- Rural Municipality: Norton No. 69
- Dissolved: 2002

Area
  - Total: 1.03 km^{2} (0.40 sq mi)

Population (2006)
  - Total: 10
  - Density: 9.7/km^{2} (25/sq mi)
- Time zone: CST
- Area code: 306

Khedive is an unincorporated community in southeastern Saskatchewan, Canada. The former village was formally dissolved in 2002. The community has a warm-summer humid continental climate, or Dfb, climate type.

== Demographics ==
In the 2021 Census of Population conducted by Statistics Canada, Khedive had a population of 20 living in 9 of its 10 total private dwellings, a change of 33.3% from its 2016 population of 15. With a land area of 0.58 km^{2} (0.22 sq mi), it had a population density of 34.5/km^{2} (89.3/sq mi) in 2021.

== See also ==
- List of communities in Saskatchewan
