= Govenlock =

Community in Saskatchewan, Canada

- Unincorporated community
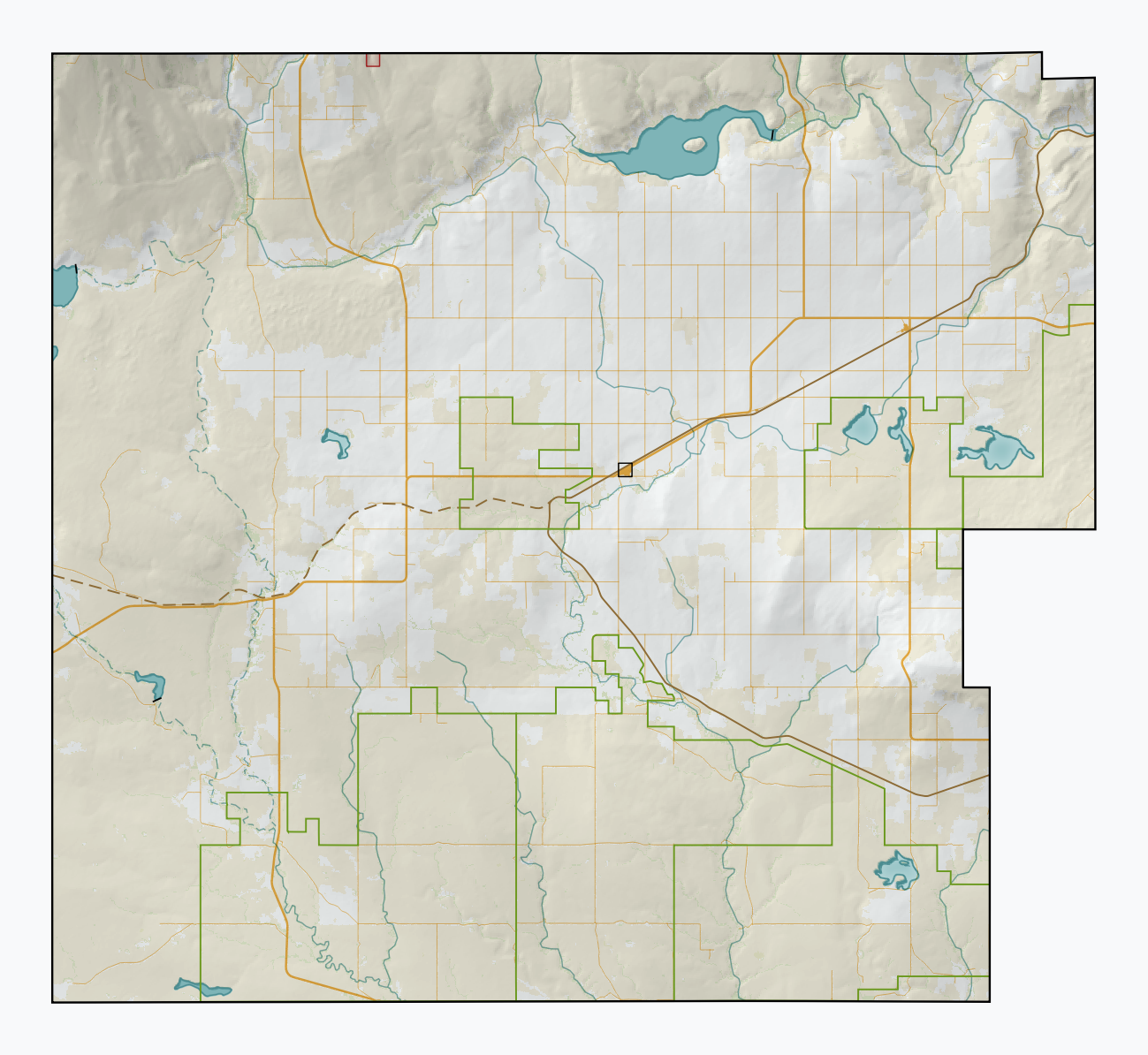
- Location within Reno No. 51 Location within Saskatchewan
- Coordinates: 49°15′43″N 109°48′32″W
- Country: Canada
- Province: Saskatchewan
- Region: Southwest Saskatchewan
- Census division: 4
- Rural Municipality: Reno No. 51
- Established: 1910
- Incorporated (Village): 1913-1976
- Dissolved: January 1, 1976

Government
  - Reeve: Brian McMillan
  - Administrator: Lacelle Kim
  - Governing body: Reno No. 51
  - MP: Jeremy Patzer
  - MLA: Doug Steele

Area
  - Total: 0.00 km^{2} (0 sq mi)

Population (2019)
  - Total: 0
  - Density: 0/km^{2} (0/sq mi)
- Postal code: S0N 2G0
- Area code: 306
- Highways: Highway 13; Highway 21
- Railways: Former Canadian Pacific Railway

Govenlock is an unincorporated community within the Rural Municipality of Reno No. 51, Saskatchewan, Canada. It previously held the status of a village, with a peak population of 151 residents; its village status was dissolved on January 1, 1976. The former townsite of Govenlock is located on Highway 21 and Highway 13, also known as the historic Red Coat Trail, about 15 kilometres (9.3 mi) east of the Alberta–Saskatchewan border and 25 kilometres (16 mi) north of the Canada–United States border. Although many cement foundations and wooden sidewalks can still be found scattered around the town site, the only building that still stands as of 2010 is the old community hall and a commemorative plaque in remembrance of Govenlock's history.

== History ==
In 1910, a Moose Jaw resident by the name of William Govenlock moved to the area with his family after applying for a homestead. They were one of the first pioneer families of Southwest Saskatchewan. In 1913, Govenlock negotiated a land deal with the Canadian Pacific Railway, starting a new town later named in his honour. That same year he established a post office for the area, with his wife Bessie as the first postmaster.

In 1914, pioneer John Linder built Govenlock's first hotel. The hotel stood two storeys tall with ten rooms. Three years later, James Gaff stopped at the hotel for a rest; after finding out that no rooms were available, Gaff immediately purchased the hotel for $4,500.

In the early part of the 20th century, Govenlock had a Canadian Pacific Railway station, a section house, multiple grain elevators, and a chamber of commerce. Businesses included two general stores, blacksmith shops, a livery barn, two machine agencies, a pool room, a laundromat, a school, a meat shop, and a service station selling Model T Fords. Most of these businesses were connected by wooden sidewalks, a common feature in the pioneer prairie days.

=== Prohibition days ===
After Montana's prohibition declaration in 1919, large groups of Americans from that state frequently crossed the border by train to visit Govenlock to purchase booze.

Four liquor warehouses were established in the centre to serve the booming liquor trade. Gambling and parties became common, attracting not only thirsty people from across the border, but many bachelors from all parts of southwestern Saskatchewan who wanted to let loose.

A pool room and two-storey dance hall building were built and owned by Henry Buss. These took advantage of American customers waiting for their liquor orders, offering a game of pool or high-stakes poker table to fill the time. Revelry and good times were staples in Govenlock during their early days.

To avoid legal problems, American bootleggers would have to obtain a tourist pass at Canada border entry points. They would come to the pioneer town with their car trunks weighed down with sand bags, in order to avoid suspicion later when they returned with a trunk full of heavy booze.

Canadian beer cost 12 cents per bottle and was said to be highly prized. Canadian whisky was more expensive and more lucrative. It was transported in barrels. Each barrel had three burlap sacks, with 24 four-quart bottles — wrapped in straw — in each sack. A barrel wholesaled for $24. When it reached the United States, it sold for $140. A carload of 14 barrels of beer and five cases of whisky could fetch a profit of $2,500.

The bootlegging trade was good business for several years and there were few legal hassles for the rumrunners. Mounties and provincial police intervened to ensure that the liquor went through the hands of locals before crossing the United States border. Even a few of the Govenlock residents tried their hand at bootlegging, but they soon found out that more of the liquor was stolen than sold.

In 1922, Govenlock's prosperity in the bootlegging business ended when the Government of Saskatchewan restricted liquor export houses to cities with 10,000 people or more. This started the slow end of the once promising pioneer town of Govenlock. Over the years and one by one, stores and shops soon closed and residents left. In 1962, the only grain elevator left in Govenlock was toppled and demolished. By 1990, rural municipality officials brought in the bulldozers and demolished all but one of the remaining buildings that stood in Govenlock, including the old Govenlock Hotel.

The only building left is the community hall, built in 1948. A commemorative plaque marks the area where Govenlock was located and honours the town's wilder pioneer days.

== Demographics ==
Prior to January 1, 1976, Govenlock was incorporated under village status, but was dissolved into an unincorporated community under the jurisdiction of the Rural Municipality of Reno No. 51 on that date.

Govenlock, like many other small communities throughout Saskatchewan, struggled to maintain a sturdy population, causing it to become a completely abandoned "ghost town". By 2006, Govenlock had a population of 0 living in 0 dwellings, a 0% increase from 2001. The community had a land area of 0.00 km^{2} (0 sq mi) and a population density of 0.0/km^{2} (0/sq mi).

== See also ==
- List of communities in Saskatchewan
- List of ghost towns in Saskatchewan
- Prohibition in Canada
