= List of ghost towns in Saskatchewan =

The following is a list of communities that no longer exist or former Villages/Towns that have become unincorporated hamlets in the province of Saskatchewan, Canada.

Ghost towns are towns that once had a considerable population, that have since dwindled in numbers causing some or all its business to close, either due to the rerouting of a highway, train tracks being pulled, or exhaustion of a natural resource. One of the more famous stories of Saskatchewan ghost towns arose around Uranium City which was close to achieving city status and utterly collapsed upon the closure of the Eldorado mine and the mass exodus of its population.

Initially travel began by horse and wagon or ox and cart along trails which generally followed animal trails across the North-West Territories. Railways would not build across the western frontier without settlement as it would be too costly to provide train service across a barren wilderness. The Clifford Sifton immigration policy encouraged settlers to arrive. Western settlement began and immigration encroached across the Manitoba border into the North-West Territories later to become the Province of Saskatchewan in 1905. Rail stations, post offices, schools, and towns sprang up approximately 6 miles (9.7 km) to 10 miles (16 km) apart to accommodate ox and cart as well as horse and wagon travel. As travel evolved to automobiles, there was no longer a need for centres this close together. In the 1940s when the highway became more popular, and the rail branch lines started to close down, saw the demise of sidings and villages located on the rail line but not on the highway. In the late 1950s and 1960s when highways were straightened and developed from gravel to asphalt and oil surface highways many of the bypassed towns and villages folded. Businesses set up shop in towns on the new straightened highway, and children could be bused to composite schools in the larger centres. The following placenames may exist only as commemorative road names which intersect the current highways and have disappeared altogether or they may be unincorporated areas of the Rural Municipality such as Floral, the birthplace of Gordie Howe. Floral would be currently located off the Yellowhead highway for example but it was on Provincial Highway 5 when the road was on the square. Floral currently is demarked by an old church at the Floral Cemetery, and the Floral one room school is now the community hall for meetings and social gatherings. The only remembrance of Floral is a road named Floral road. The road travelled on the 'square' connecting many small country towns was a different one from the highway of today connecting larger urban centres.

A rural municipality, often abbreviated RM, is a form of municipality consisting of an elected reeve for the elected head along with aldermen or Councillors of a rural municipality, performing a similar role to the mayor of a village, town or city. An RM may have its office in a town or village, which has its own separate and distinct civic administration, but the RM administers the rural affairs of a large land area including unincorporated areas or ghost towns. The RM administers the remaining population of the ghost town providing any needed civic infrastructure, safety, health, educational, or tourism affairs. Localities with small populations are enumerated in census taking by Statistics Canada as a population belonging to the RM. For instance Churchbridge No. 211 includes the localities of Beresina and the Melville Airport.

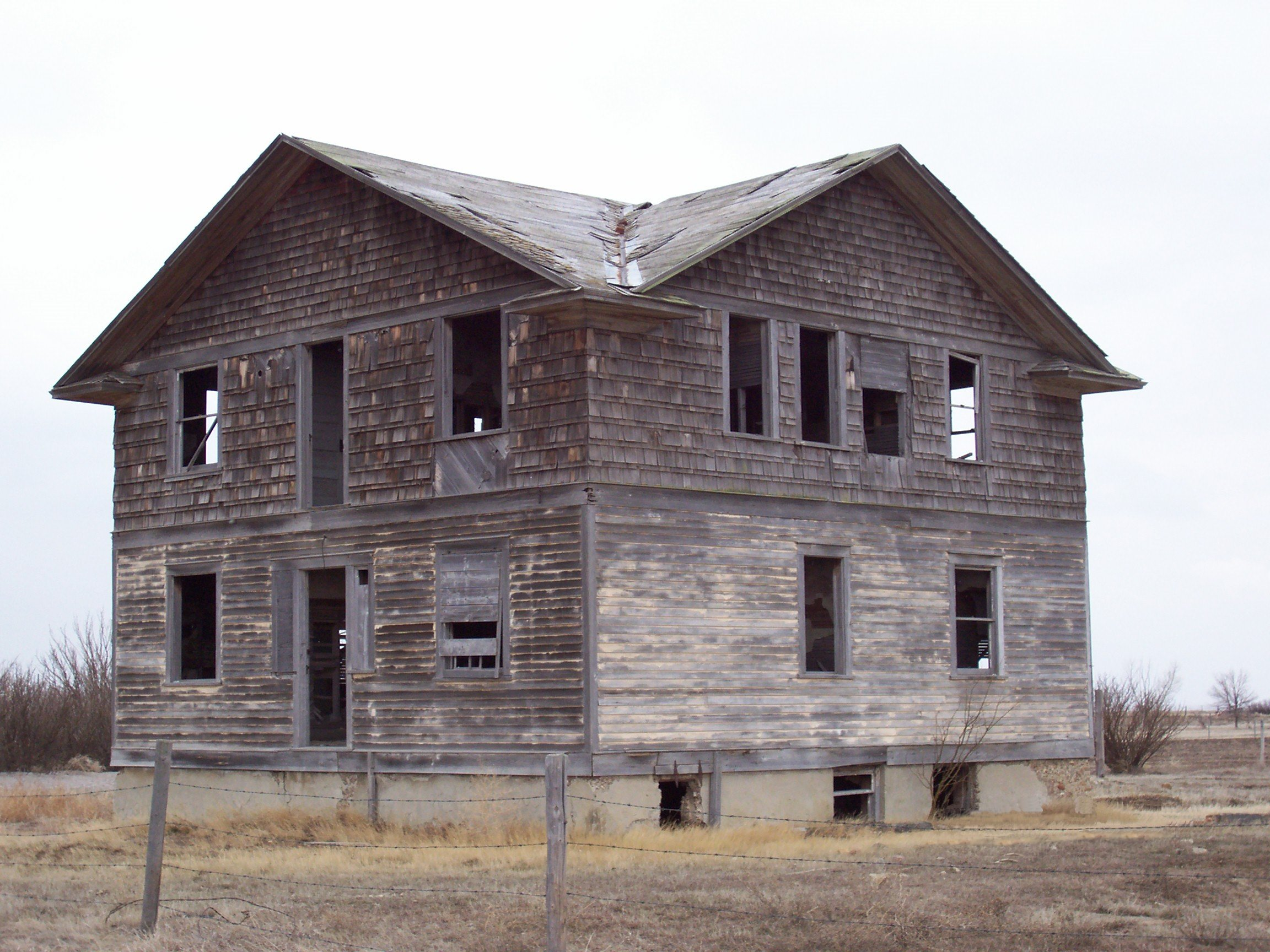
Hospital in Robsart

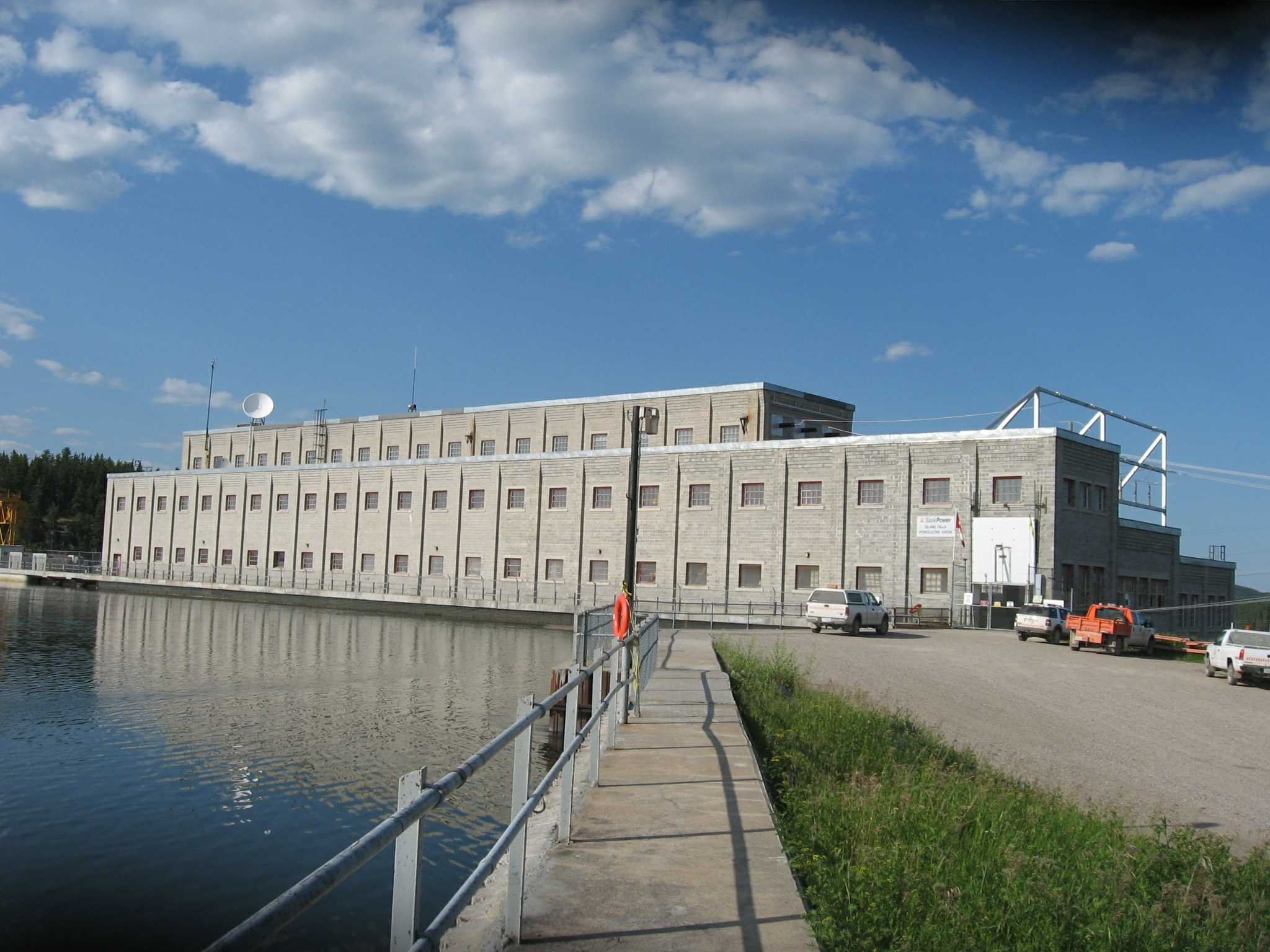
Island Falls powerhouse

== List of ghost towns ==
Name	Rural municipality (RM)	Land Address	Lat/Long
Amulet	Norton No. 16		49°37′N 104°45′W
Arena	Frontier No. 19		49°07′01″N 109°16′01″W
Auburnton	Moose Creek No. 33		49°25′N 102°04′W
Baildon	Baildon No. 131		50°09′43″N 105°16′26″W
Bateman	Gravelbourg No. 104		50°01′01″N 106°43′59″W
Battrum	Riverside No. 168		50°32′55″N 108°19′55″W
Bay Trail	Wolverine No. 340		52°07′00″N 105°09′02″W
Bayard	Terrell No. 101		50°01′19″N 105°17′28″W
Bents	Marriott No. 317		51°48′58″N 107°44′02″W
Birch Creek	Emerald No. 277	Sec.10, Twp.30, R.14, W2	51.57800° N, 103.87076° W
Blewett	Cymri No. 36	SW Sec.12, Twp.5, R.10, W2	49°21′58.41″N 103°14′02.23″W
Bonne Madone	Hoodoo No. 401		52°40′00″N 105°29′04″W
Bounty	Fertile Valley No. 285		51°31′23″N 107°21′45″W
Breeze	Browning No. 34		49.33484° N, 102.68211° W
Bresaylor	Paynton No. 470		52°58′09″N 108°45′58″W
Bromhead	Souris Valley No. 7	Sec.3, Twp.3, R.13, W2	49°10′54″N 103°40′30″W
Brooking	Laurier No. 38		49°30′00″N 104°25′01″W
Browning	Browning No. 34		49°27′08″N 102°38′02″W
Bryant	Benson No. 35	SW Sec.12 Twp.5 R.9, W2	49°20′53″N 102°59′35″W
Buffalo Gap	Hart Butte No. 11		49°06′56″N 105°16′41″W
Cactus Lake	Heart's Hill No. 352		52°06′51″N 109°48′54″W
Camsell Portage			59.60960° N, 109.25102° W
Cosine	Eye Hill No. 382		52°08′25″N 109°55′55″W
Canuck	Lone Tree No. 18		49°06′54″N 108°07′48″W
Chandler	Cymri No. 36	SW Sec.10, Twp.5, R.11, W2	49°20′00″N 103°25′01″W
Claydon	Frontier No. 19		49°07′44″N 108°32′31″W
Clearfield	Brokenshell No. 68		49.52230° N, 104.12582° W
Coalfields	Coalfields No. 4		49.10247° N, 102.74540° W
Colgate	Lomond No. 37	SE Sec.24 Twp.5 R.15, W2	49°23′46″N 103°53′38″W
Court	Antelope Park No. 322		51.85246° N, 109.87937° W
Crichton	Wise Creek No. 77		49°25′55″N 107°31′23″W
Cullen	Benson No. 35	NW-SW Sec.7 Twp.5 R.7, W2	49°13′N 102°34′W
Cummings	Maple Creek No. 111		50°01′30″N 109°33′43″W
Diana	Bratt's Lake No. 129		50°06′N 104°48′W
Divide	Reno No. 51		49°23′N 109°15′W
Dernic (Federal Grain Spur)	Buchanan No. 304		51.72724° N, 102.86020° W
Dneiper	Sliding Hills No. 273		51.44604° N, 102.19463° W
Dobrowody	Invermay No. 305		51.82087° N, 102.90533° W
Dummer	Caledonia No. 99		49°50′40″N 104°50′13″W
Elcott	Enniskillen No. 3		49.23179° N, 102.29817° W
Eldorado			59.55728° N, 108.50535° W
Elswick	Cymri No. 36	NW Sec.2 Twp.5 R.12, W2	49°22′00″N 103°31′59″W
Estuary	Deer Forks No. 232		50°55′59″N 109°54′00″W
Expanse	Lake Johnston No. 102		49°13′19″N 109°10′12″W
Eyre	Chesterfield No. 261		51.27099° N, 109.81812° W
Flintoft	Stonehenge No. 73		49.46230° N, 106.35313° W
Floral	Corman Park No. 344	Sec.4 Twp.36 R.4, W3	52°03′25″N 106°30′40″W
Forward	Norton No. 69		49°38′21″N 104°28′06″W
Froude	Griffin No. 66		49°40′19″N 103°16′52″W
Fusilier	Antelope Park No. 322		51.85254° N, 109.76882° W
Garwood	Weyburn No. 67		49.61780° N, 103.78217° W
Galilee	Terrell No. 101		50°00′N 105°36′W
Gallivan	Cut Knife No. 439		52°42′N 108°54′W
Gibbs	Longlaketon No. 219		50°54′N 104°54′W
Girvin	Arm River No. 252		51°09′00″N 105°55′01″W
Glamis	St. Andrews No. 287	NW_7_28_13_W3	51.38735° N, 107.80855° W
Glasnevin			49°18′N 105°00′W
Glen Bain	Glen Bain No. 105		49.84896° N, 107.01514° W
Glen Kerr	Morse No. 165		50.60125° N, 107.01963° W
Goldfields			59.46667° N, 108.48333° W
Goodwater	Lomond No. 37		49°23′28″N 103°53′20″W
Gouldtown	Morse No. 165		50°36′39″N 107°13′12″W
Gouverneur	Auvergne No. 76		49.75000° N, 107.61667° W
Govenlock	Reno No. 51		49°13′01″N 109°48′00″W
Grassdale	Weyburn No. 67		49.58131° N, 103.99867° W
Gunnar			59.38823° N, 108.87971° W
Halkett	Estevan No. 5		49.17829° N, 103.05354° W
Hallonquist	Coulee No. 136		50°06′58″N 107°15′00″W
Handsworth	Golden West No. 95		50°45′N 106°24′W
Hardy	The Gap No. 39		49°28′56″N 104°43′17″W
Harptree	Bengough No. 40		49°18′41″N 105°25′16″W
Hatton	Maple Creek No. 111		50°02′46″N 109°49′39″W
Hearne	Redburn No. 130		50°33′32″N 105°49′52″W
Herschel	Mountain View No. 318		51°39′18″N 108°25′23″W
Hoffer	Souris Valley No. 7		49.11670° N, 103.86716° W
Holloway	Cymri No. 36	NW Sec.1 Twp.6 R.12, W2	49.43556° N, 103.47312° W
Horizon	Bengough No. 40		49°31′08″N 105°13′34″W
Hughton	Monet No. 257		51°32′01″N 108°16′52″W
Hume	Griffin No. 66		49.66833° N, 103.60980° W
Huntoon	Griffin No. 66		49.55234° N, 103.24842° W
Innes	Griffin No. 66		49.60275° N, 103.36136° W
Insinger	Insinger No. 275		51°32′00″N 103°04′59″W
Instow	Bone Creek No. 108		49°13′19″N 109°10′12″W
Island Falls			55°31′44″N 102°21′25″W
Jasmin	Ituna Bon Accord No. 246		51°13′42″N 103°38′46″W
Jordan River	Arborfield No. 456		53.13336° N, 103.46713° W
Kayville	Key West No. 70		49°43′33″N 105°09′00″W
Kingsford	Browning No. 34		49.26717° N, 102.77989° W
Lakenheath	Stonehenge No. 73		49.54650° N, 106.27487° W
Lillestrom	Hillsborough No. 132		50°16′00″N 105°52′04″W
Loomis	Frontier No. 19		49°07′19″N 109°26′28″W
Loverna	Antelope Park No. 322		51°40′01″N 110°00′06″W
Luxton	Browning No. 34		49.37396° N, 102.76851° W
Masefield	Val Marie No. 17		49°55′N 107°29′W
Maxim	Lomond No. 37	NE Sec.21 Twp. 4 R.15, W2	49°18′58.7″N 103°58′43.9″W
Minard	Browning No. 34		49.37723° N, 102.79137° W
Nashlyn	Reno No. 51		49°12′00″N 109°31′05″W
Neidpath	Coulee No. 136		50°10′44″N 107°22′30″W
Neptune	Lomond No. 37		49°22′21.4″N 104°04′08.8″W
Neville	Whiska Creek No. 106		49°58′16″N 107°40′23″W
New Finland	Willowdale No. 153		50°25′34″N 102°12′47″W
Old Wives	Hillsborough No. 132		50°12′00″N 105°00′04″W
Oungre	Souris Valley No. 7		49°08′44″N 103°48′07″W
Outram	Cambria No. 6		49°09′00″N 103°19′00″W
Oxarat	Reno No. 51		49°26′00″N 109°35′02″W
Parkbeg	Wheatlands No. 163		50°27′00″N 106°16′01″W
Pinto	Coalfields No. 4		49.06753° N, 102.70017° W
Polwarth	Canwood No. 494		53.42996° N, 106.73434° W
Rangeview	Reno No. 51		49°12′00″N 109°21′04″W
Ravenscrag	White Valley No. 49		49.4931°N 109.0956°W
Reynaud	Three Lakes No. 400		52.63123° N, 105.43531° W
Robinhood	Medstead No. 497		53.28227° N, 108.20190° W
Robsart	Reno No. 51		49°23′00″N 109°17′02″W
Romance	Leroy No. 339		52.06209° N, 104.62221° W
Roseray	Pittville No. 169		50°28′00″N 108°29′02″W
Rutland	Colonsay No. 342		52°30′58″N 109°32′53″W
Scotsguard	Bone Creek No. 108		49°43′00″N 108°09′04″W
Senate	Reno No. 51		49°15′40″N 109°48′29″W
Service	Moose Mountain No. 63		49.67278° N, 102.03874° W
Shand	Estevan No. 5		49.09965° N, 102.87942° W
Smuts	Grant No. 372		52°26′06″N 106°06′52″W
South Fork	Arlington No. 79		49°36′00″N 108°43′01″W
Southall	Souris Valley No. 7		49.197777° N, -103.714186° W
St. Boswells	Glen Bain No. 105		50°03′00″N 106°50′02″W
Tableland	Estevan No. 5		49.14357° N, 103.17558° W
Tarnopol	Invergordon No. 430		52°42′00″N 105°23′02″W
Tatagwa	Weyburn No. 67	NW Sec.17 Twp.8 R.15, W2	49.65203° N, 104.00306° W
Tate	Mount Hope No. 279		51.44536° N, 104.84275° W
Tiny	Buchanan No. 304		51.67101° N, 102.59730° W
Taylorton	Coalfields No. 4		49.08453° N, 102.74885° W
Trossachs	Brokenshell No. 68		49°38′19″N 104°13′37″W
Truax	Elmsthorpe No. 100		49°54′N 104°57′W
Union Jack	Weyburn No. 67		49.60945° N, 103.94552° W
Uren	Chaplin No. 164		50°28′27″N 106°45′58″W
Valjean	Chaplin No. 164		50°30′N 106°36′W
Valley Centre	Marriott No. 317		51.79581° N, 107.84655° W
Vantage	Sutton No. 103		49°50′27″N 106°01′55″W
Verlo	Pittville No. 169		50.32380° N, 108.60334° W
Vesper	Lac Pelletier No. 107		50.01922° N, 108.02504° W
Vidora	Reno No. 51		49°20′00″N 109°25′05″W
Viewfield	Benson No. 35	SW S.34 Twp.6 R.9, W2 and NW Sec.27 Twp 6 R.9, W2	49°30′22.8″N 103°08′34.0″W
Wauchope	Antler No. 61		49°36′N 101°54′W
Wheatstone	Key West No. 70		49°44′03.6″N 105°15′04.7″W
Winter	Round Valley No. 410		52°36′59″N 109°30′17″W
Woodley	Browning No. 34		49°15′N 102°32′W
Xena	Morris No. 312		51°43′00″N 105°36′00″W
Yonker	Senlac No. 411		52.652645°N 109.638748°W

== See also ==
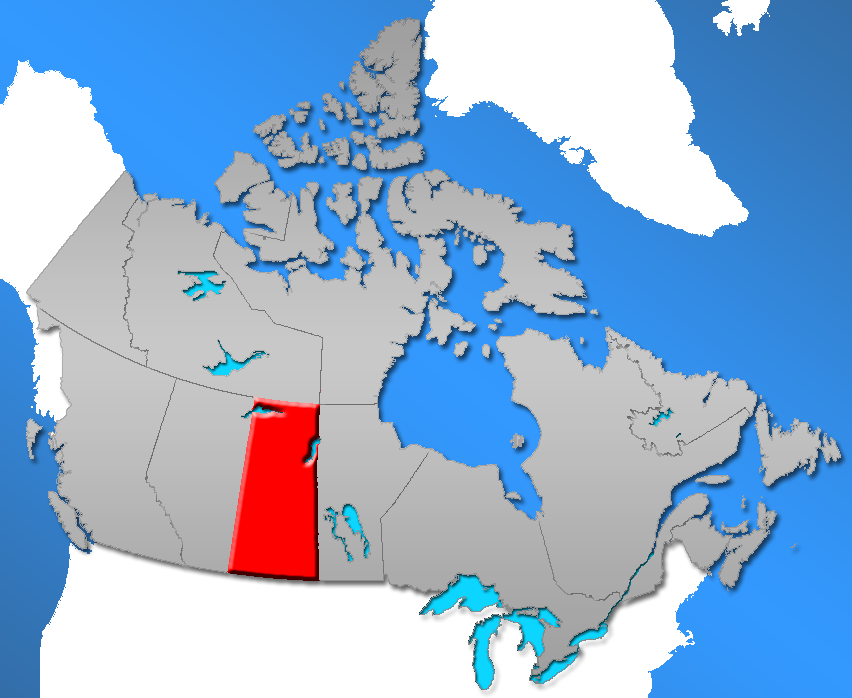
Ghost towns in Canada by province or territory
- Lists of ghost towns in Canada
- List of communities in Saskatchewan
