= Chandler, Saskatchewan =

Hamlet in Saskatchewan, Canada

Chandler
- Unincorporated Hamlet
- Location of Chandler in Saskatchewan
- Coordinates: 49°20′00″N 103°25′02″W
- Country: Canada
- Province: Saskatchewan
- Region: Southwest Saskatchewan
- Census division: 8
- Rural Municipality: Cymri No. 36
- Post Office Established: Never established
- Postal code: N/A
- Area code: 306

Chandler is a ghost town in Cymri Rural Municipality, Saskatchewan, Canada. The site was on the Canadian Northern Railway line from Lampman to Radville. The site only had a train station that served the town of Midale two miles to the north by horse drawn stage coach. The Chandler town site was abandoned by the railway in 1927, and the rail-line abandoned in 1951.

== See also ==
- List of communities in Saskatchewan
- List of hamlets in Saskatchewan
- Lists of ghost towns in Canada
- List of ghost towns in Saskatchewan
