= Winter, Saskatchewan =

Community in Saskatchewan, Canada

Winter
- Unincorporated
- Location within Saskatchewan
- Coordinates: 52.6163014°N 109.5046766°W
- Country: Canada
- Province: Saskatchewan
- Region: West Central
- Census division: 13
- Rural Municipality: Senlac
- Established: 1908
- Time zone: CST
- Postal code: S0K
- Area code: 306
- Highways: Highway 675; Highway 787

Winter is an unincorporated locality in Senlac Rural Municipality No. 411, Saskatchewan, Canada. It is located on Highway 787 & 675, 50 km northwest of Unity, the nearest town. It is 15 km North of Rutland and 35 km South of Neilburg. Winter is located at Mile 77.3 on the Canadian National Railway (Formerly the Grand Trunk Pacific Railway (GTPR) until 1923). The community gets its name from Mr. O. Winter, who was a contractor for the Grand Trunk Pacific Railway. Mr. Winter named the siding after himself. This line was named alphabetically, from the east "Vera", after Winter's daughter, and to the west (skipping over 'x') "Yonker", named after his mother's family. Winter had a store with post office, an elevator, a GTPR station, a lumber yard and a school that closed in 1968. Winter community well was said to have soft water.

== History ==
The community of Winter was established in 1908 with the arrival of the Grand Trunk Railway. Initially it began as a small section and siding along the Grand Trunk Railway. A small unincorporated settlement established itself shortly after containing a number of businesses. Mr. Mansel Cole operated the first store and post office after 1910 and served people from Winter and the surrounding districts. The first grain elevator was built in 1920 and several businesses followed in years to come, including a lumber yard. In 1924 a railway station was built. The school closed in 1968 and all the remaining students were bussed to the neighbouring community of Senlac.

== Government ==
Winter is located in the Rm of Senlac No.411, which is itself situated in Census Division No. 13 Saskatchewan

== See also ==
- List of Grand Trunk Pacific Railway stations
- List of communities in Saskatchewan
- List of ghost towns in Saskatchewan
