= Elswick =

Elswick may refer to:

- Elswick, Lancashire, England
- Elswick, Newcastle upon Tyne, Tyne and Wear, England
- Elswick, Saskatchewan, a ghost town in Canada
- Elswick (automobile), an English automobile
- Elswick Ordnance Company, part of Armstrong Whitworth
