= Elswick, Saskatchewan =

Hamlet in Saskatchewan, Canada

Elswick
- Unincorporated Hamlet
- Location of Elswick in Saskatchewan
- Coordinates: 49°22′00″N 103°32′02″W
- Country: Canada
- Province: Saskatchewan
- Region: Southwest Saskatchewan
- Census division: 8
- Rural Municipality: Cymri No. 36
- Post Office Established: July 1, 1911
- Post Office Closed: September 30. 1930
- Postal code: NA
- Area code: 306
- Highways: Highway 606

Elswick is a ghost town in Cymri Rural Municipality, Saskatchewan, Canada. The town site was on the Canadian Northern Railway line from Lampman to Radville. The town had a box-car train station, grain elevator, small store and post office. The town site was abandoned by the railway in 1927 and the rail-line abandoned in 1951.

== See also ==
- List of communities in Saskatchewan
- List of hamlets in Saskatchewan
- Lists of ghost towns in Canada
- List of ghost towns in Saskatchewan
