= Arena, Saskatchewan =

Hamlet in Saskatchewan, Canada

Arena
- Hamlet
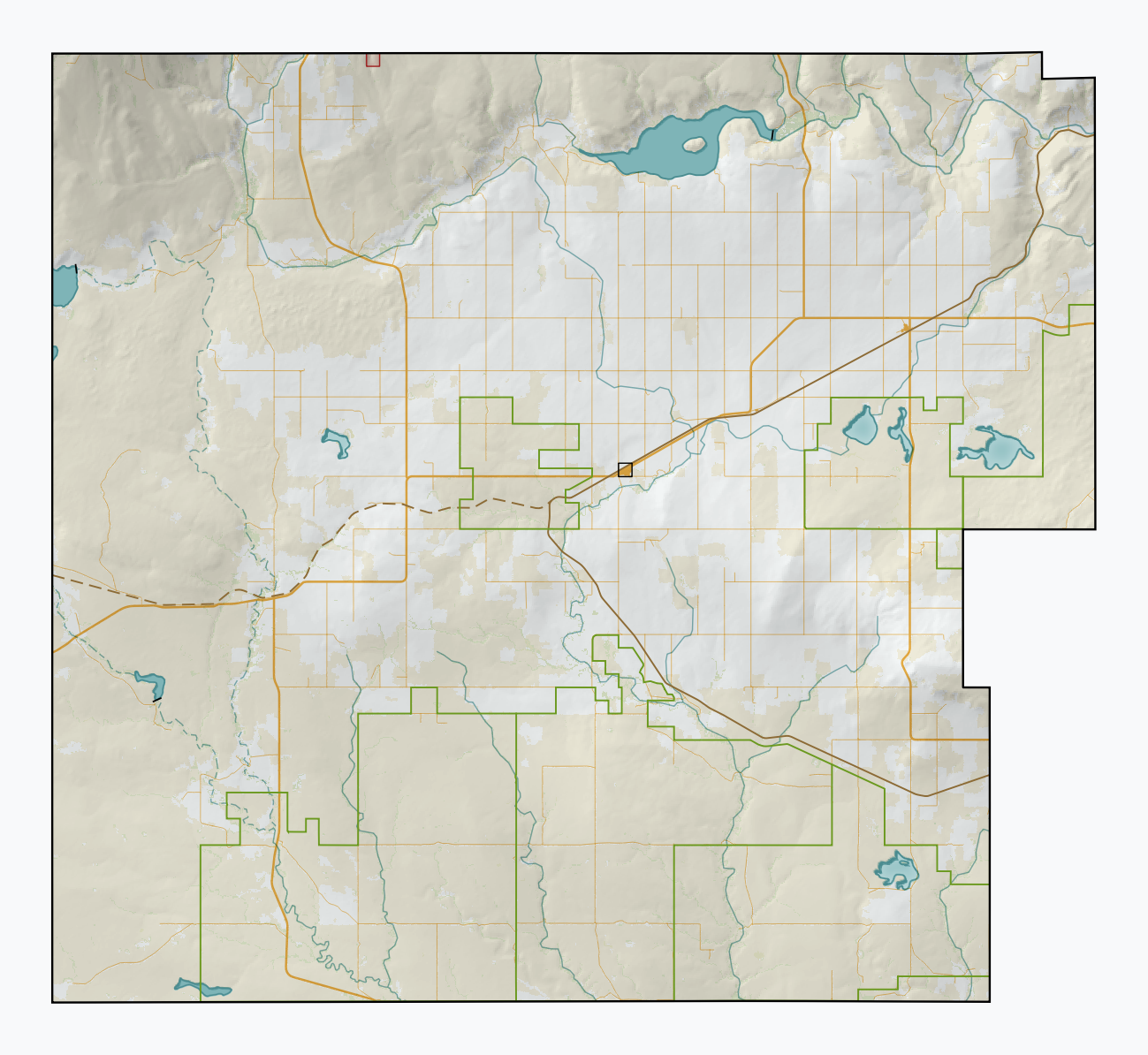
- Location within Reno No. 51 Location within Saskatchewan
- Coordinates: 49.1162°N 109.2669°W
- Country: Canada
- Province: Saskatchewan
- Region: South west, Saskatchewan
- Census division: 4
- Rural Municipality: Frontier
- Established: 1910

Population (2001)
  - Total: 0
- Postal code: S0N 2G0
- Area code: 306
- Climate: BSk

Arena was once a hamlet in the southwestern part of the province of Saskatchewan, Canada.

== See also ==
- Lists of ghost towns in Canada
- List of ghost towns in Saskatchewan
