= Crystal Falls =

Crystal Falls may refer to:

Places in Brazil

- Crystal Falls (Brazil)

Places in Canada

- Crystal Falls, Ontario, a community in West Nipissing
- Crystal Falls, Quebec

Places in the United States

- Crystal Falls, Michigan
- Crystal Falls Township, Michigan
