= List of ghost towns in Quebec =

The following is a list of known abandoned communities in Quebec, Canada.

- Aylmer Sound
- Baie-Sainte-Claire
- Beauchêne
- Biron
- Boscobel
- Casey
- Crystal Falls
- Fort George
- Gagnon
- Goose Village, Montreal
- Joutel
- Labrieville
- L'Anse-aux-Fraises
- McTavish
- Nitchequon
- Oskélanéo
- Pascalis
- Pellegrin
- Rameau
- Rivière-La Guerre
- Sacré-Cœur-Deslandes
- Saint-Charles-Garnier-de-Pabos-Nord
- Saint-Cyriac
- Saint-Edmond-de-Pabos
- Saint-Étienne-de-Ristigouche
- Saint-Fidèle-de-Ristigouche
- Saint-Gabriel-de-Rameau
- Saint-Ignace-du-Lac
- Saint-Jean-Vianney
- Saint-Nil
- Saint-Octave-de-l'Avenir
- Saint-Paulin-Dalibaire
- Saint-Thomas-de-Cherbourg
- Snake Creek
- Shrewsbury
- Val-Jalbert (now a tourist attraction)
- Van Bruyssel

== See also ==
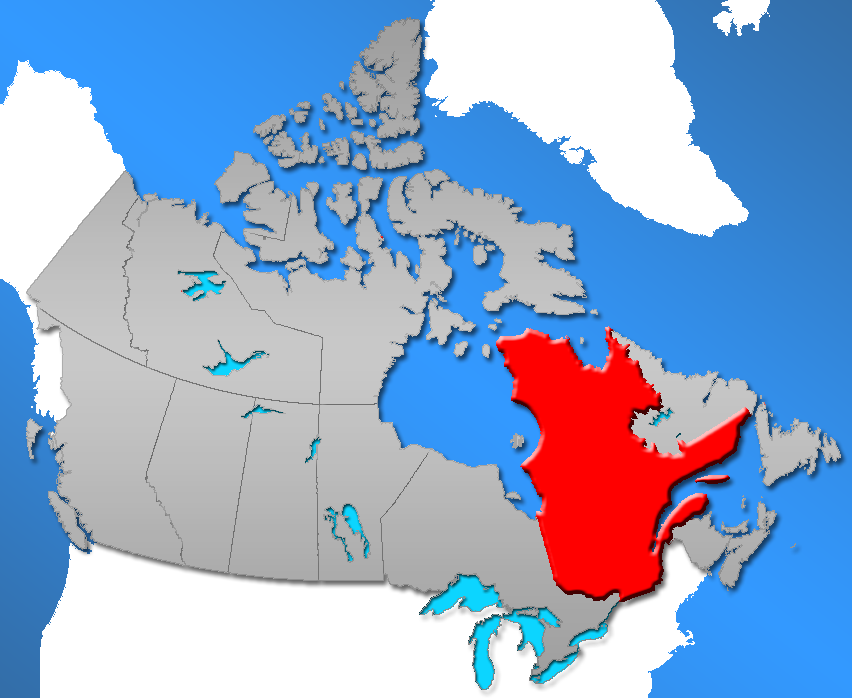
Ghost towns in Canada by province or territory
- List of communities in Quebec
- List of ghost towns in Canada
- List of Indian reserves in Quebec
- Census divisions of Quebec
