= Hearne, Saskatchewan =

Hamlet in Saskatchewan, Canada

Hearne
- Hamlet
- Motto: Town of Dreams
- Location of Hearne in Saskatchewan Hearne (Canada)
- Coordinates: 50°33′32″N 105°49′52″W
- Country: Canada
- Province: Saskatchewan
- Region: Southeast Saskatchewan
- Census division: 6
- Rural Municipality: Redburn

Government
  - Reeve: Arnold Cornea
  - Administrator: Guy Lagrandeur
  - Governing body: Redburn No. 130

Population (2006)
  - Total: 2
- Postal code: S0G 4H0
- Area code: 306
- Highways: Highway 339

Hearne is an unincorporated hamlet in Redburn Rural Municipality No. 130, Saskatchewan, Canada. Located 34 km southwest of Rouleau, Hearne is the birthplace of Canadian newspaper and magazine journalist Allan Fotheringham.

== See also ==
- List of communities in Saskatchewan
- List of hamlets in Saskatchewan
- Lists of ghost towns in Canada
- List of ghost towns in Saskatchewan
