= Midale =

Town in Saskatchewan, Canada

- Town
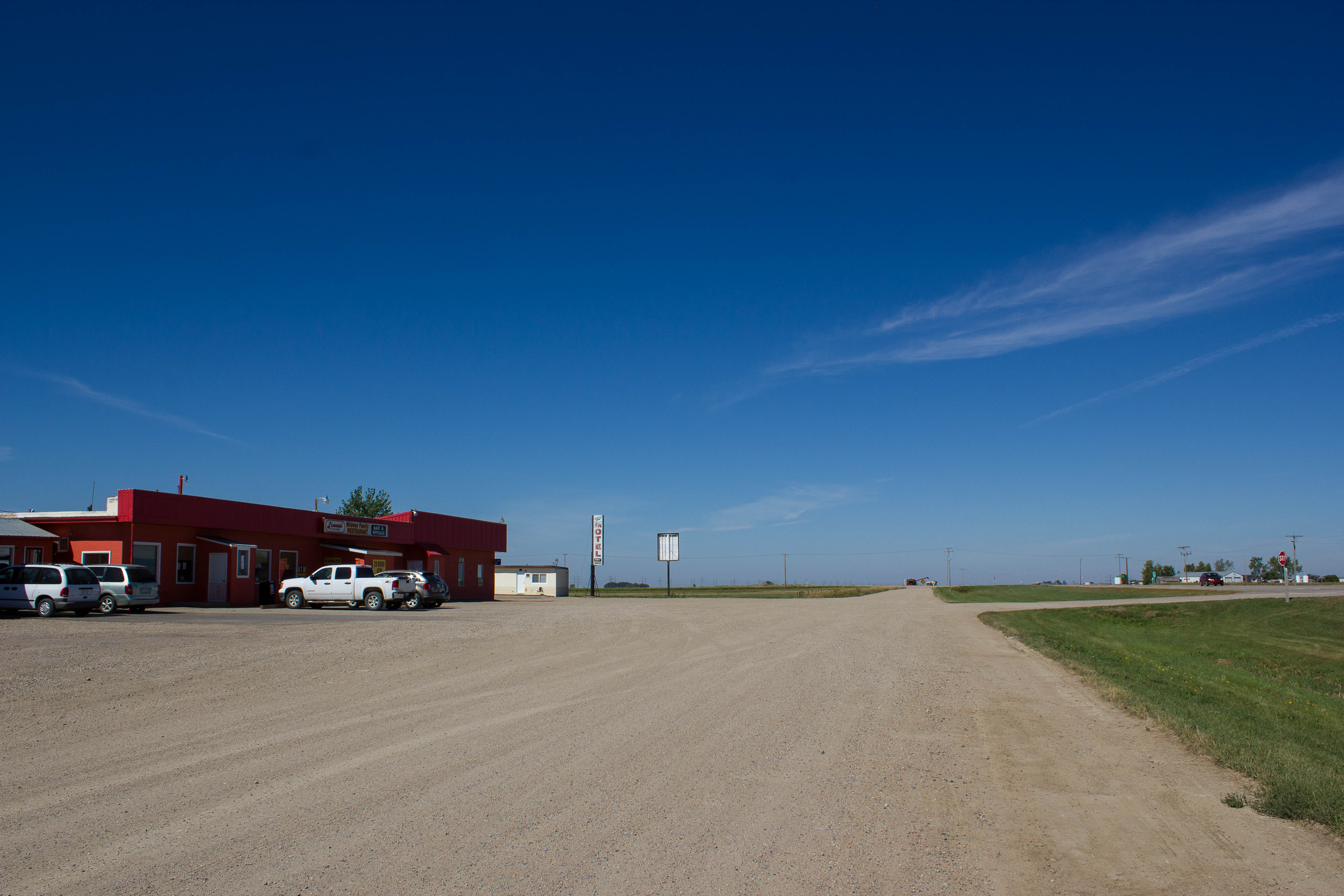
- Midale, Saskatchewan

- Location of Midale in Saskatchewan
- Coordinates: 49°24′N 103°24′W
- Country: Canada
- Province: Saskatchewan
- Rural Municipalities (R.M.): Cymri No. 36
- Post office Founded in NWT: 1903-08-01

Government
  - Mayor: Allan Hauglum
  - Federal Electoral District Souris—Moose Mountain M.P.: Robert Kitchen
  - Provincial Constituency Estevan M.L.A.: Lori Carr

Area
  - Total: 1.53 km^{2} (0.59 sq mi)

Population (2011)
  - Total: 562
  - Density: 368.5/km^{2} (954/sq mi)
- Time zone: CST
- Postal code: S0C 1S0
- Area codes: 306, 639
- Highways: Highway 39 / Highway 606 / Highway 702
- Website: www.townofmidale.com

Midale (/ˈmaɪdeɪl/) is a town in the Rural Municipality of Cymri No. 36, in the Canadian province of Saskatchewan. It is located on Highway 39, midway between the cities of Weyburn and Estevan. It is 160 kilometres (100 mi) south-east of Regina.

== History ==
Midale was incorporated as a village in 1907, although the first settlers of the area arrived in 1903.

Almost all of the original settlers had filed on a 160 acre homestead, offered by the Canadian government for men 18 years and older.

After a period where the settlement was known as the Halbrite and Macoun siding, the original suggestion for a name was "Mitchell" after Dr. R.M. Mitchell, who served an area from Estevan to Moose Jaw between 1899 and 1903. The idea had to be abandoned due to an existing community with the same name, so a compromise was made to combine the first two letters of "Mitchell" with the last name of the man credited as the area's first settler, Ole Dale, creating "Midale."

Midale's first hospital opened on March 7, 1949, with Premier T.C. Douglas paying a visit to the community to cut the ribbon.

The town continues to pay tribute to its agricultural and pioneer roots with the annual Midale Threshing Bee.

== Demographics ==
In the 2021 Census of Population conducted by Statistics Canada, Midale had a population of 510 living in 210 of its 259 total private dwellings, a change of −15.6% from its 2016 population of 604. With a land area of 1.62 km^{2} (0.63 sq mi), it had a population density of 314.8/km^{2} (815.4/sq mi) in 2021.

== Climate ==
Midale

Climate chart (precipitation, max. and min. temperature)
J	F	M	A	M	J	J	A	S	O	N	D
- █ Average max. and min. temperatures in °C
- █ Precipitation totals in mm
Imperial conversion
J	F	M	A	M	J	J	A	S	O	N	D
- █ Average max. and min. temperatures in °F
- █ Precipitation totals in inches

Midale has a humid continental climate (Köppen Dfb).

On July 5, 1937 a maximum temperature of 45 °C (113.0 °F) was recorded, which was, along with that of the village of Yellow Grass, the highest temperature ever recorded in Canada. This record stood for 84 years until June 27, 2021 when it was surpassed by Lytton, British Columbia, which reached 46.6 °C (115.9 °F).

Climate data for Midale, 1981–2010 normals, extremes 1923–present
Month	Jan	Feb	Mar	Apr	May	Jun	Jul	Aug	Sep	Oct	Nov	Dec	Year
Record high °C (°F)	10.0 (50.0)	17.8 (64.0)	25.0 (77.0)	33.5 (92.3)	38.9 (102.0)	39.4 (102.9)	45.0 (113.0)	41.7 (107.1)	38.0 (100.4)	33.5 (92.3)	24.0 (75.2)	17.2 (63.0)	45.0 (113.0)
Mean daily maximum °C (°F)	−9.9 (14.2)	−6.1 (21.0)	0.6 (33.1)	11.5 (52.7)	18.1 (64.6)	22.4 (72.3)	25.6 (78.1)	26.2 (79.2)	20.5 (68.9)	11.7 (53.1)	0.8 (33.4)	−6.0 (21.2)	9.6 (49.3)
Daily mean °C (°F)	−14.7 (5.5)	−10.9 (12.4)	−4.3 (24.3)	5.2 (41.4)	11.3 (52.3)	16.2 (61.2)	18.9 (66.0)	18.7 (65.7)	13.2 (55.8)	5.4 (41.7)	−4.0 (24.8)	−10.9 (12.4)	3.7 (38.7)
Mean daily minimum °C (°F)	−19.5 (−3.1)	−15.7 (3.7)	−9.3 (15.3)	−1.2 (29.8)	4.5 (40.1)	10.0 (50.0)	12.2 (54.0)	11.2 (52.2)	5.7 (42.3)	−0.9 (30.4)	−8.6 (16.5)	−15.7 (3.7)	−2.3 (27.9)
Record low °C (°F)	−43.9 (−47.0)	−48.3 (−54.9)	−40.0 (−40.0)	−26.1 (−15.0)	−12.2 (10.0)	−4.4 (24.1)	−1.7 (28.9)	−5.0 (23.0)	−11.1 (12.0)	−22.8 (−9.0)	−34.0 (−29.2)	−44.0 (−47.2)	−48.3 (−54.9)
Average precipitation mm (inches)	19.1 (0.75)	18.9 (0.74)	26.4 (1.04)	32.2 (1.27)	69.3 (2.73)	77.2 (3.04)	60.9 (2.40)	45.6 (1.80)	28.9 (1.14)	29.4 (1.16)	25.5 (1.00)	20.5 (0.81)	453.9 (17.87)
Average rainfall mm (inches)	1.0 (0.04)	1.0 (0.04)	6.7 (0.26)	18.7 (0.74)	62.8 (2.47)	76.9 (3.03)	60.9 (2.40)	45.6 (1.80)	28.9 (1.14)	19.7 (0.78)	3.3 (0.13)	0.1 (0.00)	325.5 (12.81)
Average snowfall cm (inches)	18.2 (7.2)	17.9 (7.0)	20.0 (7.9)	13.6 (5.4)	6.5 (2.6)	0.3 (0.1)	0.0 (0.0)	0.0 (0.0)	0.03 (0.01)	10.4 (4.1)	22.2 (8.7)	20.4 (8.0)	129.4 (50.9)
Average precipitation days (≥ 0.2 mm)	8.2	5.8	7.5	7.1	11.3	13.9	10.4	8.7	7.2	7.1	6.7	7.7	101.0
Average rainy days (≥ 0.2 mm)	0.33	0.33	2.2	5.1	10.9	13.9	10.4	8.7	7.1	5.5	0.73	0.20	65.5
Average snowy days (≥ 0.2 cm)	7.9	5.5	5.6	2.5	0.73	0.07	0.0	0.0	0.06	1.8	5.5	7.6	37.3
Source: Environment Canada

== Parks and recreation ==
Midale offers a variety of recreational venues. The local ice rink, Harry O Memorial Arena, is home to the Midale Mustangs of the men's senior Big 6 Hockey League. A team from Midale has won the Lincoln Trophy four times, once as the Miners in 1961 and three straight years as the Mustangs in the 2000s. The town also has a curling rink, the Joe Vilcu Memorial Civic Center, museum, library, ball diamonds, and an outdoor swimming pool.

Twelve kilometres away is Mainprize Regional Park, which features an 18-golf course, camping, and swimming. Mainprize is on McDonald Lake, which is a man-made lake created in 1994 with the building of Rafferty Dam on the Souris River.

== Notable people ==
- Brad Johner, country music singer-songwriter and musician
- Walt Ledingham, played in the NHL for the Chicago Black Hawks and New York Islanders
- Keely Shaw, Paralympian athlete, Track para-cycling.

== See also ==
- List of towns in Saskatchewan
- List of weather records
- Weyburn-Midale Carbon Dioxide Project
- History of the petroleum industry in Canada
