= Allan Fotheringham =

Canadian journalist (1932–2020)

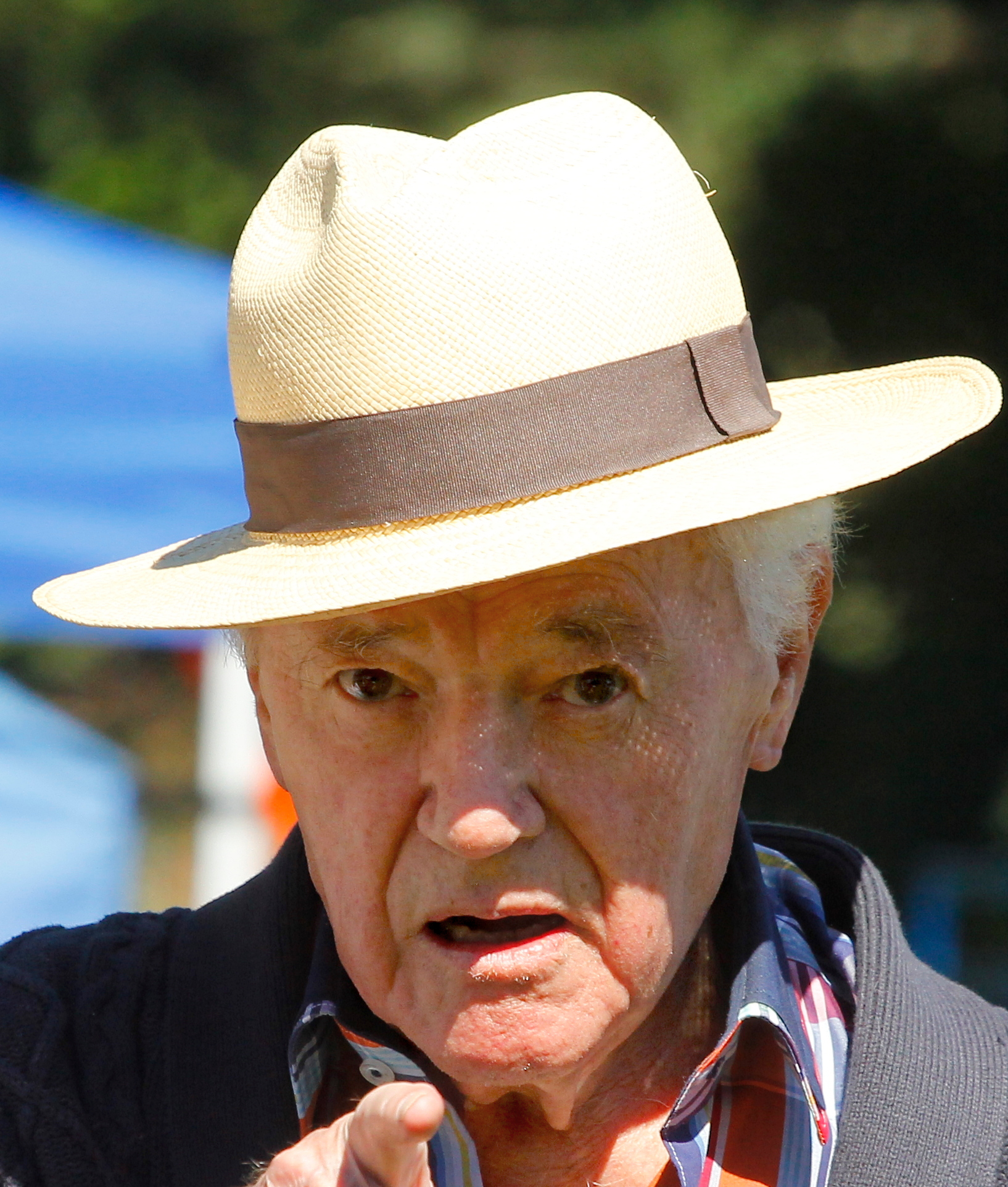
- Allan Fotheringham at the Canadian Film Centre BBQ (2014)
- Born: Murray Allan Scott; August 31, 1932; Hearne, Saskatchewan, Canada
- Died: August 19, 2020 (aged 87); Toronto, Ontario, Canada
- Burial place: Mount Pleasant Cemetery, Toronto
- Other name: "Dr. Foth"
- Education: University of British Columbia
- Occupation: Journalist
- Spouses: Sallye Delbridge (m. 1963; div. 1980) Anne Libby (m. 1998)

Allan Fotheringham (August 31, 1932 – August 19, 2020) was a Canadian newspaper and magazine journalist. He styled himself Dr. Foth and "the Great Gatheringfroth". He was described as "never at a loss for words".

== Early life ==
Fotheringham was born in Hearne, Saskatchewan, on August 31, 1932. His father died from an appendectomy gone wrong when Fotheringham was two, and his mother remarried, with Allan taking his stepfather's surname. He attended Chilliwack Secondary School, where he was active in student leadership and wrote for the school's paper, as well as the Chilliwack Progress. Upon graduation he studied English and political science at the University of British Columbia and worked at a variety of media outlets during his career. He was best known as a columnist, originally at the Ubyssey, a student newspaper. He was hired straight out of university by the Vancouver Sun in the late 1960s, and covered the final years of WAC Bennett's Socred government provincially and the advent of Pierre Trudeau federally. Fotheringham's columns and commentaries brought him national attention as well as wider syndication and a broader subject base. He was one of the leading specialists in explaining the world of British Columbia politics during his time at the Sun.

== Career ==
Fotheringham wrote for Maclean's starting in October 1975. His column appeared on the back page of the magazine for 27 years, and was so widely read and so influential that he is said to have made Maclean's the magazine people read "from back to front". Consequently, he dubbed a collection of them as "Last Page First". Some of his more memorable political nicknames include "the brogue that walks and talks like a man" (for Jack Webster) and "the jaw that walks and talks like a man" (for Brian Mulroney). He is credited with coining the terms "Natural Governing Party" for the federal Liberals, and the "Holy Mother Corporation" for the CBC in the course of writing his column. His columns occasionally opened with the exclamation "Zowie, Dr. Foth!"

Fotheringham was a regular panelist for a decade in the latter years of the CBC Television program Front Page Challenge, having replaced the deceased Gordon Sinclair in 1984. He also wrote columns for the Toronto Sun for fourteen years until 2000. In 2001, Maclean's underwent an editorial revamp, and Fotheringham's column was moved to an inside page to make room for a guest column. Soon afterward, Fotheringham left Maclean's, and became a columnist for The Globe and Mail. He had a national syndicated column that was in 20 newspapers, but he retired from regular contributions in 2007, after life-threatening complications from a colonoscopy led to his hospitalization for five months. Fotheringham continued to write occasionally for the Globe and for the National Post, as well as a Calgary magazine called The Roughneck.

== Later years ==
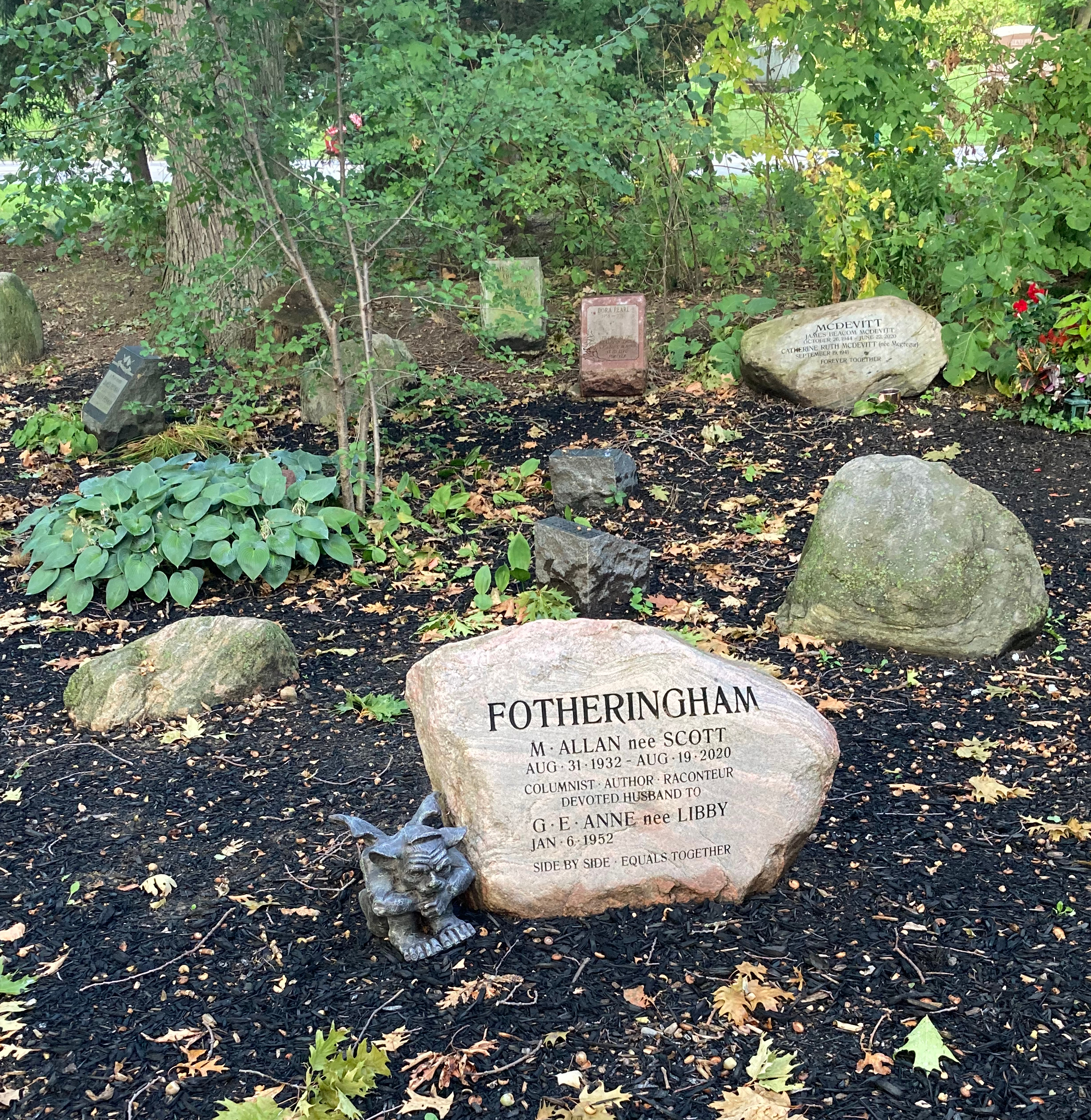
Fotheringham's grave at Mount Pleasant Cemetery

Fotheringham had honorary degrees from the University of New Brunswick (2003) and the University of Saskatchewan (2005). He died on August 19, 2020, at his home in Toronto. He was 12 days short of his 88th birthday. His wife noted that he was in "generally poor health" in the time leading up to his death. He was buried at Mount Pleasant Cemetery, Toronto.

== Controversies ==
In a 1984 column, he wrote that two Vancouver lawyers were "cementing their connections through the tennis club circuits and the wife-swapping brigades". A judge awarded the lawyers $10,000 each in damages for libel.

In a 1988 article about the British explorer Ranulph Fiennes, he wrote that "Prince Charles always supports him, claiming great results for British exports, but no one has ever been able to demonstrate that any scientific or historical benefits have resulted." A London jury awarded £75,000 in damages against Fotheringham and his publishers.

In 1987, Fotheringham quipped that the United States was not serious about free trade negotiations with Canada because its chief negotiator Peter Murphy had an inoperable brain tumor, which is alleged to have led to his dismissal from his Washington post with Southam News.

Fotheringham was repeatedly accused of plagiarism throughout his career. He told an interviewer that "I don't think it's all that serious" since "all journalism is based on basically what someone else has written or reported."

== Invented terms ==
Affectionately known as "Foth" as well as "Dr. Foth", he dubbed himself "the Great Gatheringfroth", and coined some well-known terms in British Columbian political history:

- Lotusland – British Columbia, particularly Victoria
- the Granite Curtain – the Rocky Mountains
- the Tweed Curtain – the Oak Bay, British Columbia–Victoria border, referring to the former's conservative British character
- "the Brogue that walks and talks like a man" – journalist and broadcaster Jack Webster (who had many nicknames, not all of them Foth's). Foth later adapted this phrase to "the Jaw that walks and talks like a man" for Brian Mulroney.
- the Natural Governing Party – the federal Liberals
- the Holy Mother Corporation – the CBC
- Jurassic Clark – Joe Clark
- "The only man in Canada who can't speak either of the two official languages" – Jean Chrétien
- Coma City – Ottawa
- Vancouver, the Narcissus of the West Coast

== Quotes ==
- "In the Maritimes, politics is a disease; in Quebec a religion; in Ontario a business; on the Prairies a protest; and in British Columbia an entertainment." — Malice in Blunderland (1982)
- "The Tories are like cream: rich, thick and full of clots." — Fotheringham quoting a Liberal Convention Delegate in LOOK MA...NO HANDS (1983)

== Awards ==
- Southam Fellowship in Journalism, 1964
- National Magazine Award for Humor, 1980
- National Newspaper Award for Column Writing, 1980 (first recipient)
- Inducted into the Canadian News Hall of Fame, 1999
- Bruce Hutchinson Lifetime Achievement Award, 2002

== Bibliography ==
- — (1972). Collected and Bound. Vancouver: November House. ISBN 0-88894008-4. OCLC 725832.
- Roy Peterson; Allan Fotheringham (1979). The World According to Roy Peterson, with the Gospel According to Allan Fotheringham. Vancouver: Douglas & McIntyre. ISBN 0-88894254-0. OCLC 6438082.
- — (1982). Malice in Blunderland, or, How the Grits stole Christmas. Toronto: Key Porter. ISBN 0-91949301-7. OCLC 9482409.
- — (1983). Look Ma — no hands : an affectionate look at our wonderful Tories. Toronto: Key Porter. ISBN 0-91949318-1. OCLC 10653091.
- — (1986). Capitol offences : Dr. Foth meets Uncle Sam. Toronto: Key Porter. ISBN 1-55013004-8. OCLC 16027895.
- — (1989). Birds of a Feather: The Press and the Politicians. Toronto: Key Porter. ISBN 1-55013166-4. OCLC 19847892.
- — (1999). Last Page First. Illustrated by Roy Peterson. Toronto: Key Porter. ISBN 1-55013995-9. OCLC 39386118.
- — (2001). Fotheringham's Fictionary of Facts and Follies. Toronto: Key Porter. ISBN 1-55263357-8. OCLC 47238252.
- — (2011). Boy From Nowhere - A Life in Ninety-One Countries. Toronto: Dundurn Press. ISBN 978-1-45970168-7. OCLC 760073216.

== See also ==
- List of newspaper columnists
