= Malmgren, Saskatchewan =

Malmgren
- Location of Malmgren Malmgren (Canada)
- Coordinates: 51°40′00″N 107°55′05″W
- Country: Canada
- Province: Saskatchewan
- Rural Municipalities (R.M.): Marriott 317
- Time zone: CST
- Postal code: SK S0L

Malmgren is an unincorporated community in the Rural Municipality of Marriott No. 317 in Saskatchewan, Canada.

Malmgren belongs to the federal electoral district of Saskatoon—Rosetown—Biggar which was formerly known as Saskatoon—Rosetown.
