= Woodley, Saskatchewan =

- Unincorporated community
- Location within Saskatchewan
- Coordinates: 49.250°N 102.540°W
- Country: Canada
- Province: Saskatchewan
- Region: Southeast Saskatchewan
- Census division: 1
- Rural Municipality: Benson

Government
  - Reeve: David Hoffort
  - Administrator: Laureen Keating
  - Governing body: Benson No. 35

Area
  - Total: 0.00 km^{2} (0 sq mi)
- Elevation: 593 m (1,947 ft)

Population (2011)
  - Total: 0
  - Density: 0/km^{2} (0/sq mi)
- Time zone: CST
- Area code: 306

Woodley is an unincorporated community in Benson Rural Municipality No. 35, Saskatchewan, Canada. Woodley, like many other small communities throughout Saskatchewan, has struggled to maintain a steady population which made Woodley a ghost town.

== Heritage sites ==
- St Luke's Lutheran church was built in 1929 by Emil Kraus.

== See also ==
- List of communities in Saskatchewan
