= Yonker =

- Location within Saskatchewan
- Coordinates: 52.6502°N 109.6682°W
- Country: Canada
- Province: Saskatchewan
- Census division: 13
- Rural Municipality: Senlac
- Time zone: CST
- Area code: 306

Yonker is an unincorporated locality in Senlac Rural Municipality No. 411, Saskatchewan, Canada. It is located about 42 kilometres (26 mi) east of Chauvin, Alberta. Yonker is located along the Canadian National Railway (Formerly the Grand Trunk Pacific Railway (GTPR) until 1923). The community gets its name from Mr. O. Winter, who was a contractor for the Grand Trunk Pacific Railway. This line was named alphabetically, from the east, "Vera", after his daughter, "Winter" after himself; and to the west (skipping over 'x') "Yonker", named after his mother's family.

== See also ==
- List of Grand Trunk Pacific Railway stations
- List of communities in Saskatchewan
- List of ghost towns in Saskatchewan
