= Griffin, Saskatchewan =

Community in Saskatchewan, Canada

Griffin
- Special Service Area
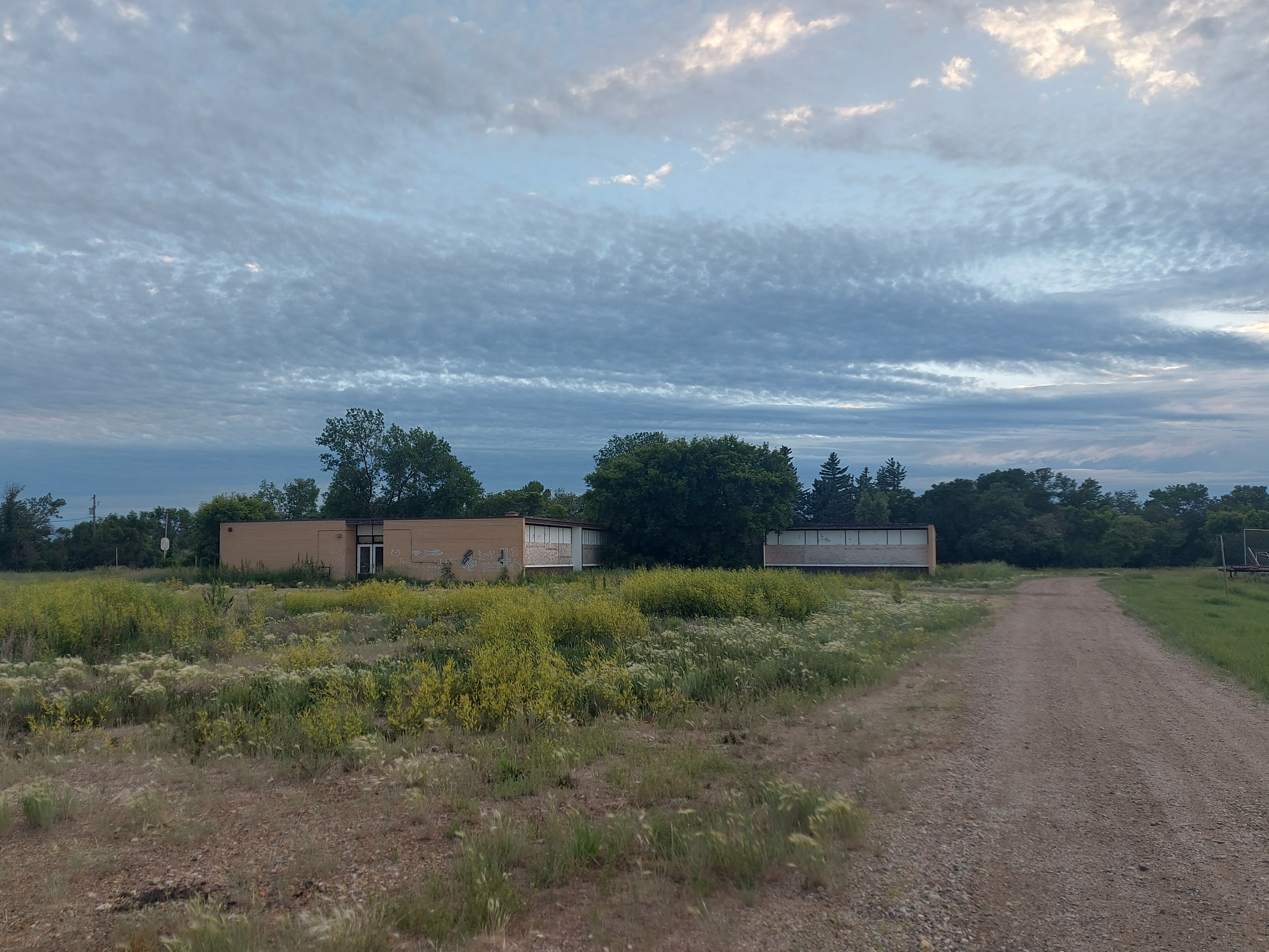
- Abandoned school in Griffin

- Location in Saskatchewan Griffin (Canada)
- Coordinates: 49°40′00″N 103°26′02″W
- Country: Canada
- Province: Saskatchewan
- Region: Southeast Saskatchewan
- Census division: 2
- Rural municipality: Griffin No. 66

Government
  - Federal Electoral District MP: Robert Kitchen (CPC - Souris—Moose Mountain)
  - Provincial Constituency MLA: Dan D'Autremont (SK - Cannington)

Area
  - Land: 0.62 km^{2} (0.24 sq mi)

Population (2016)
  - Total: 111
  - Density: 177.9/km^{2} (461/sq mi)
- Time zone: CST
- Postal code: S0C 1G0
- Area code: 306
- Highways: Highway 13 (Red Coat Trail / Ghost Town Trail) / Highway 606
- Railways: Canadian Pacific

Griffin is a special service area within the Rural Municipality of Griffin No. 66 in the Canadian province of Saskatchewan. Listed as a designated place by Statistics Canada, the community had a population of 111 (a 73.4% increase from 2011) in the Canada 2016 Census. The community is also the seat of the RM of Griffin No. 66.

== Demographics ==
In the 2021 Census of Population conducted by Statistics Canada, Griffin had a population of 128 living in 45 of its 55 total private dwellings, a change of 15.3% from its 2016 population of 111. With a land area of 0.61 km^{2} (0.24 sq mi), it had a population density of 209.8/km^{2} (543.5/sq mi) in 2021.

Canada census – Griffin, Saskatchewan community profile

	2016	2011
Population	111 (+ 73.4% from 2011)	64 (+ 30.6% from 2006)
Land area	0.62 km^{2} (0.24 sq mi)	0.62 km^{2} (0.24 sq mi)
Population density	177.9/km^{2} (461/sq mi)	102.5/km^{2} (265/sq mi)
Median age	28.5 (M: 29.5, F: 27.8)	32.5 (M: 30.8, F: 36.8)
Private dwellings	54 (total)	36 (total)
Median household income	$Not Available	$Not Available

References: 2016 2011

== See also ==
- List of communities in Saskatchewan
