= Robinhood, Saskatchewan =

Hamlet in Saskatchewan, Canada

Coordinates: 53.2834°N 108.2007°W

Robinhood is a hamlet in the Rural Municipality of Medstead No. 497, Saskatchewan, Canada. The hamlet is located at the junction of Highway 794 and Range road 160, approximately 10 kilometres (6.2 mi) west of the village of Medstead.

The name "Robin" was chosen for the hamlet for the new post office in 1923 because a school was given the same moniker three years earlier. However, the federal post office department told locals they couldn't have "Robin" because the agency didn't want confusion with a Roblin post office in Manitoba. The owners of the general store and post office, John and Annie Wilson, submitted their second name choice — Robinhood — and it was accepted by federal officials.

By 1971 the post office was disbanded and most of Robinhood's residents left. For many years after the post office closure, Robinhood was even taken off government highway maps.

== See also ==
- List of communities in Saskatchewan
- List of hamlets in Saskatchewan
- List of ghost towns in Saskatchewan
