= Cullen, Saskatchewan =

Community in Saskatchewan, Canada

Cullen
- Unincorporated Hamlet
- Location within Saskatchewan Location within Canada
- Coordinates: 49.220°N 102.570°W
- Country: Canada
- Province: Saskatchewan
- Region: Southeast Saskatchewan
- Census division: 1
- Rural municipality: Benson No. 35
- Established: 1911

Government
  - Reeve: David Hoffort
  - Administrator: Laureen Keating
  - Governing body: Benson No. 35

Area
  - Total: 0.00 km^{2} (0 sq mi)
- Elevation: 596 m (1,955 ft)

Population (2011)
  - Total: 0
  - Density: 0/km^{2} (0/sq mi)
- Time zone: CST
- Area code: 306
- Highways: Highway 361
- Railways: Canadian National

Cullen is a former hamlet in the Rural Municipality of Benson No. 35, Saskatchewan, Canada.

Cullen and the nearby community of Bryant were named after Quaker poet, journalist, and editor William Cullen Bryant.

== Demographics ==
Cullen, like so many other small communities throughout Saskatchewan, has struggled to maintain a sturdy population causing it to become a semi ghost town.

== See also ==
- List of communities in Saskatchewan
- List of hamlets in Saskatchewan
