= Bents =

- Unincorporated community
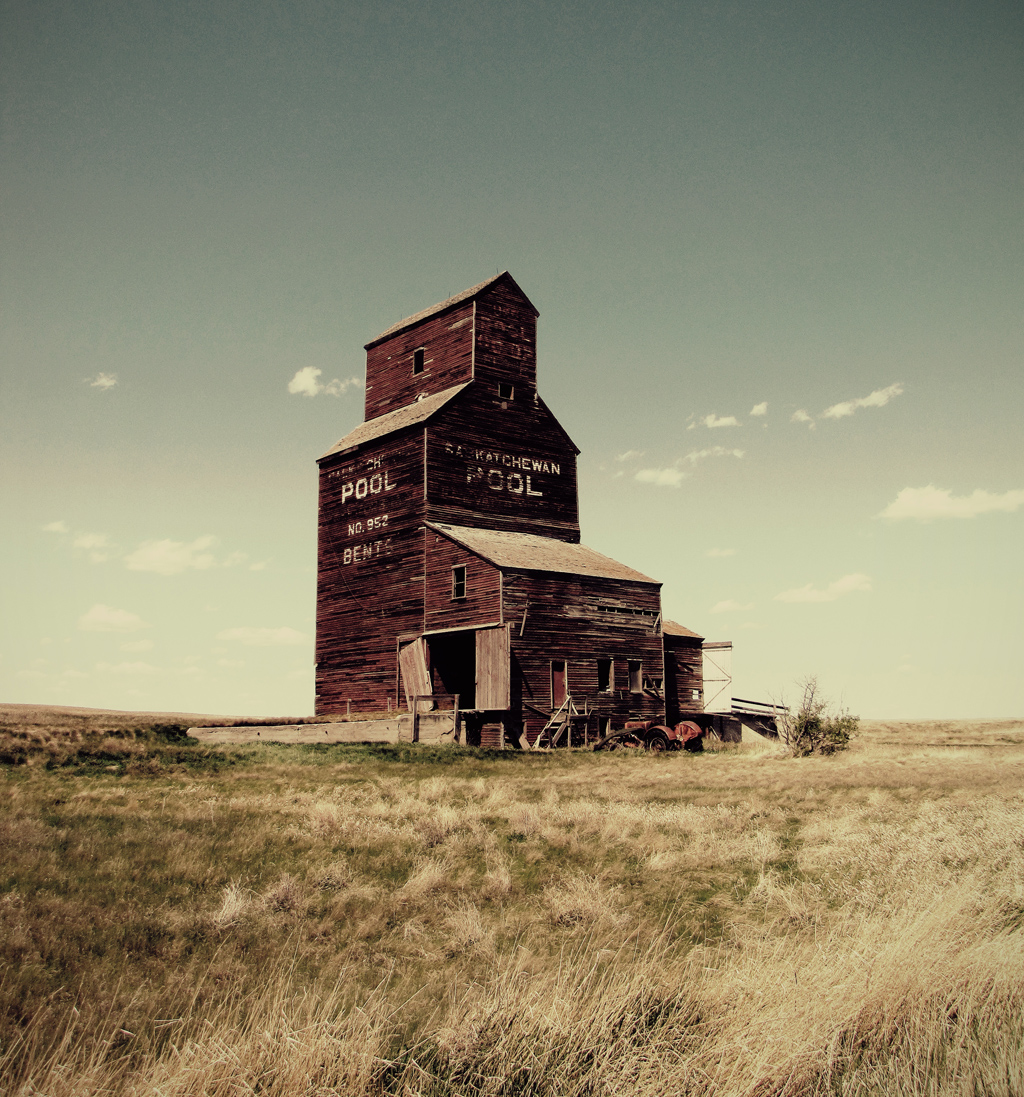
- Bents grain elevator.

- Location within Saskatchewan Location within Canada
- Coordinates: 51.816°N 107.734°W
- Country: Canada
- Province: Saskatchewan
- Region: Southwest Saskatchewan
- Census division: 12
- Rural municipality: Marriott No. 317
- Established: 1905
- Incorporated (Village]): N/A

Government
  - Administrator: Michelle McQueen
  - Governing body: Marriott No. 317
- Time zone: CST
- Postal code: S0L 2V0
- Area code: 306
- Highways: Range Road 131
- Waterways: The Coteau

Bents is an unincorporated community in the Rural Municipality of Marriott No. 317, Saskatchewan, Canada. Prior to the town founding, the area was referred to as Piche. Bents took its name from Longniddry Bents in Scotland. Its derelict wooden grain elevator was once the subject of a National Geographic photograph. The remnants of the town are now located on private property.

== History ==
Bents was officially established in 1930 along a CPR rail line that ran between Perdue and Rosetown. The railway came through the area in 1929 and at one point Bents boasted several residential homes, a small train station, two grain elevators, a dance hall, a general store (Longworth’s General Store) and post office — all along a single street. By the 1960s, the town faced a decline when the southern section of the rail line was abandoned. The general store, above which lived the proprietor's family, was in business until the early 1960s. The railway continued to run through Bents until the 1970s when it too was torn up around 1977. It was at this time that the Saskatchewan Wheat Pool elevator, built in 1928 with the coming of the railway, was closed permanently. The United Grain Growers elevator, also built in 1928, was sold to the Wheat Pool in the late 1960s and was also closed and torn down in the 1970s.

Today, little remains. Only one of the two elevators, the Saskatchewan Wheat Pool elevator, still stands. There are two houses left. One belonged to a vast family and the other belonged to an auctioneer. The general store/post-office is still there but is mostly deteriorated. There are random outbuildings and old farm machinery dotting the former town site. The former town site is now private property and has been the subject of vandalism over the years. Any visits to Bents must be arranged with the landowner.

== Gallery ==
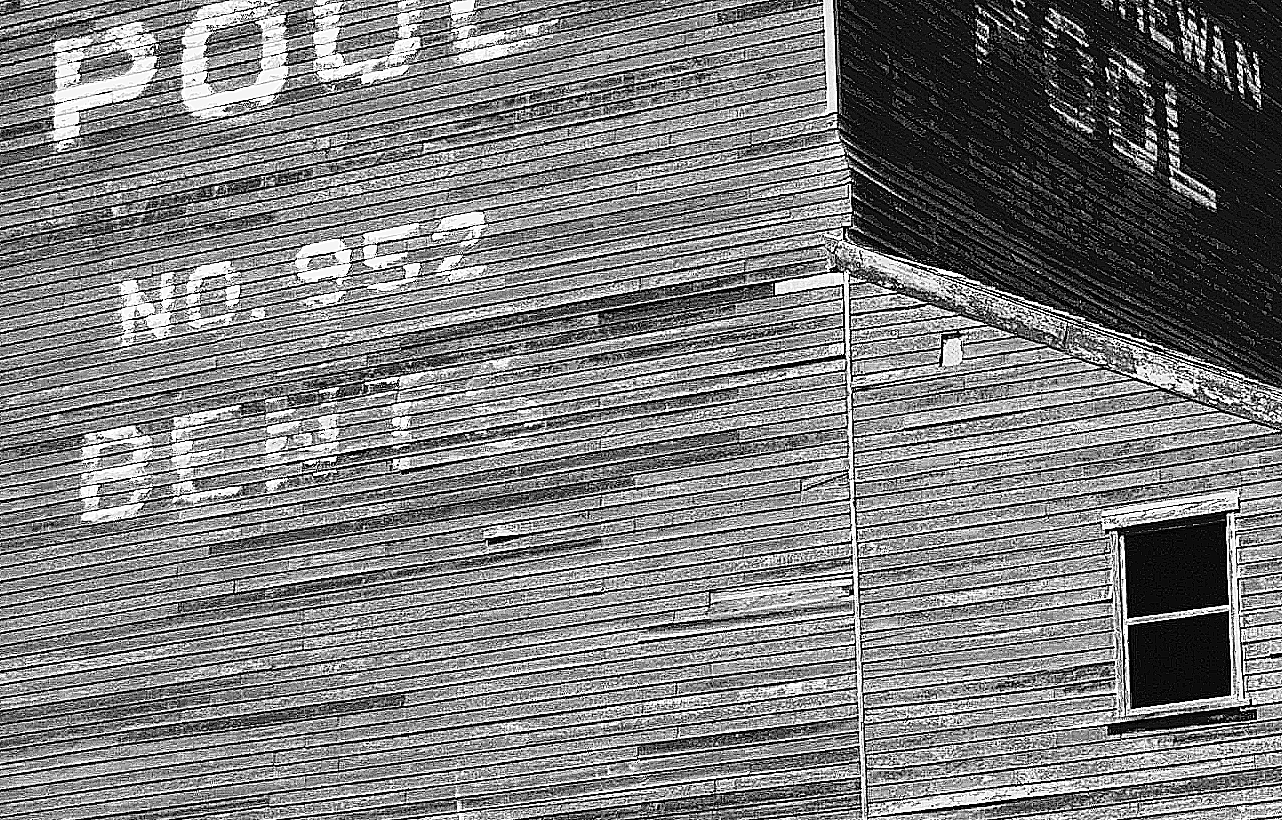

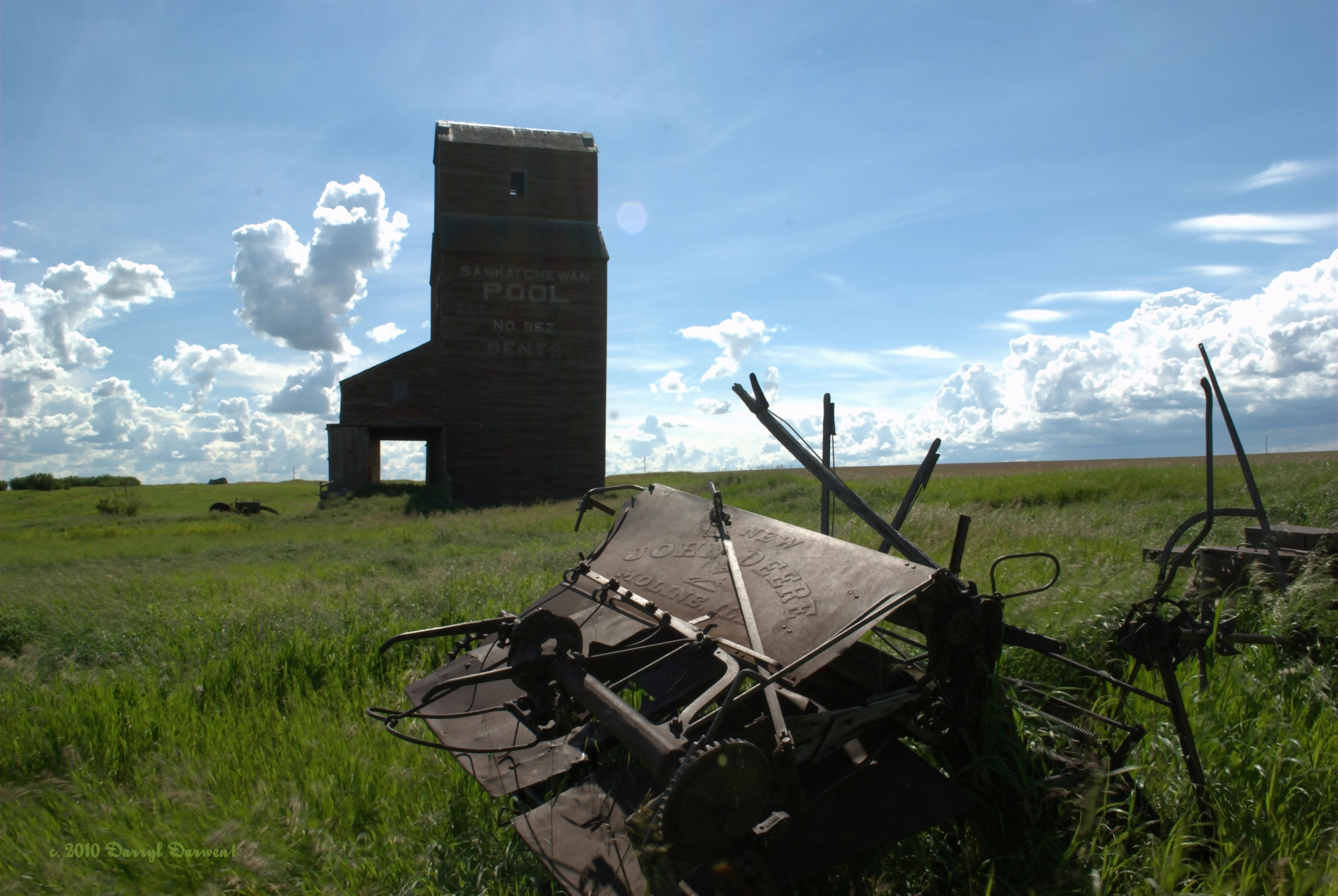

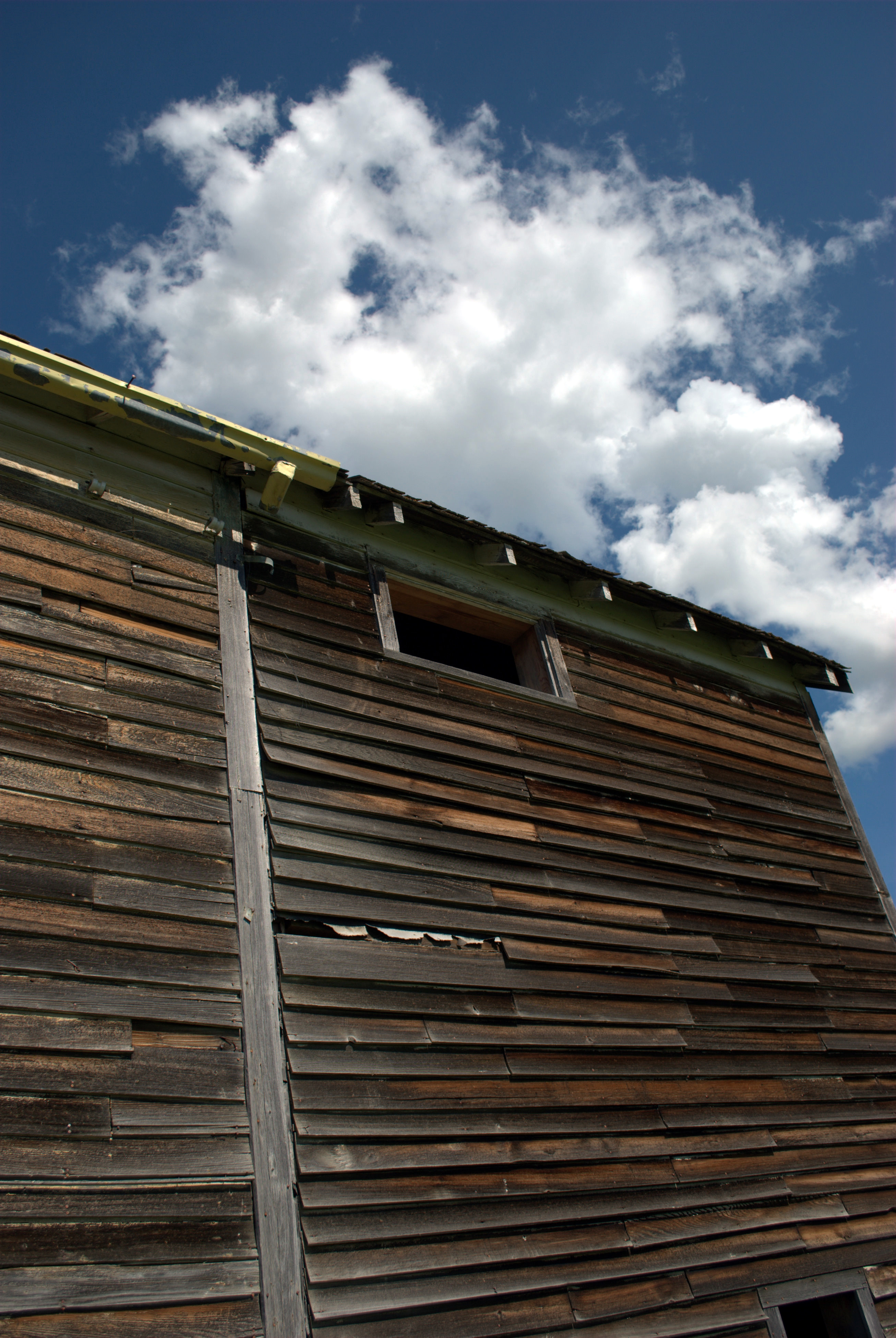

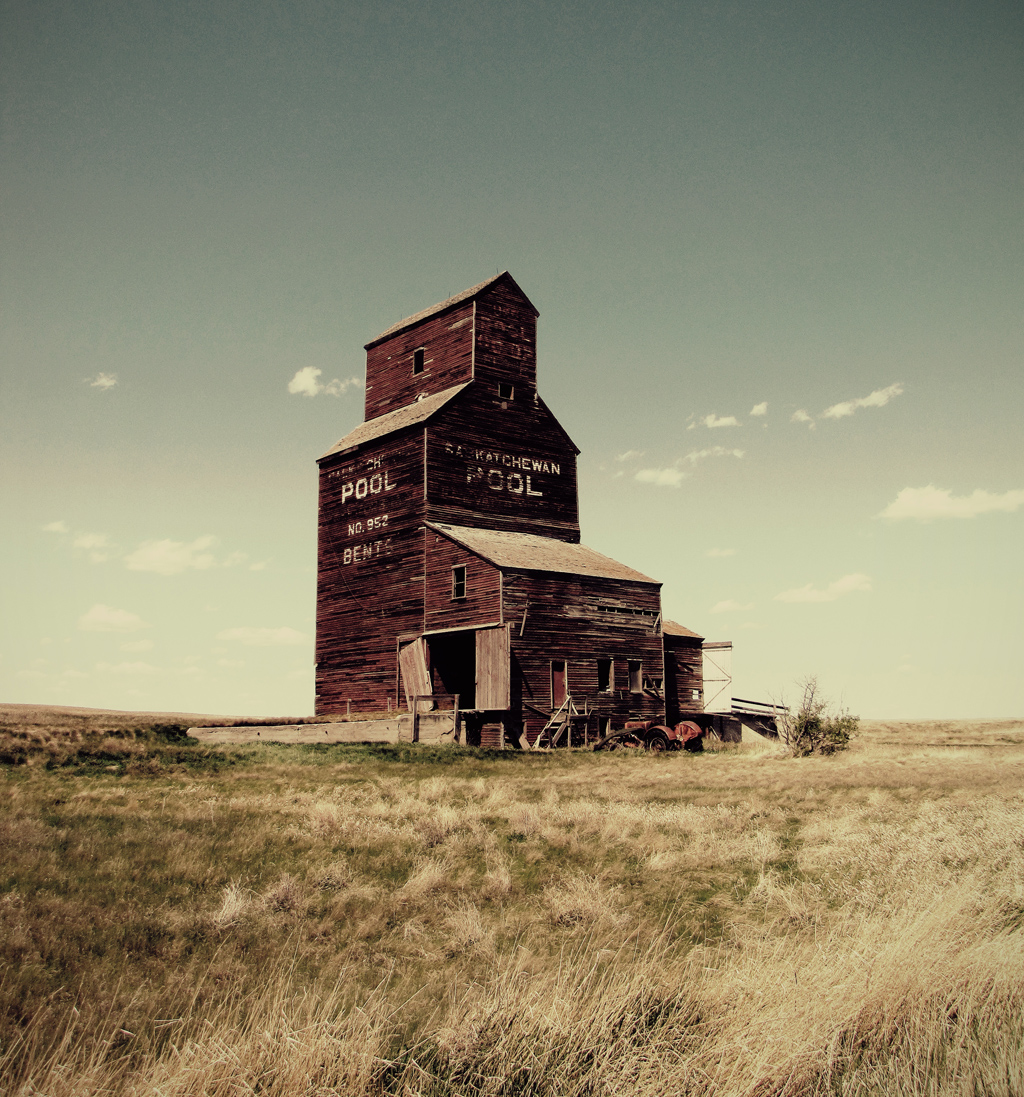

== See also ==
- List of communities in Saskatchewan
- List of ghost towns in Saskatchewan
