= Pitman, Saskatchewan =

Community in Saskatchewan, Canada

Pitman
- Hamlet
- Location of Pitman in Saskatchewan Pitman (Canada)
- Coordinates: 50°15′00″N 105°02′02″W
- Country: Canada
- Province: Saskatchewan
- Region: Southeast
- Census division: 6
- Rural municipality: Redburn No. 130

Government
  - Reeve: Arnold Cornea
  - Administrator: Guy Lagrandeur
  - Governing body: Redburn No. 130
- Postal code: S0G 4H0
- Area code: 306
- Highways: Highway 39

Pitman is an unincorporated hamlet in the Rural Municipality of Redburn No. 130, Saskatchewan, Canada. Located }34 kilometres (21 mi) southeast of Moose Jaw on Highway 39.

Pitman used to be a small hamlet located on the CPR Soo Line that runs southeast from Moose Jaw to North Portal and then down into the United States. The line was built in 1890, but Pitman never developed until about 1910 and the post office opened on May 1, 1911 with Mr. W. Stewart appointed as the postmaster. The name was chosen for Sir Isaac Pitman, a noted English educator who devised a system of shorthand that is still in use today. By the 1960s Pitman declined and the post office closed on June 29, 1966. When driving down highway 39 now, the only indication of the location of Pitman is a small sign on the railway.

== See also ==
- List of communities in Saskatchewan
- List of hamlets in Saskatchewan
