= Benson, Saskatchewan =

Community in Saskatchewan, Canada

Benson
- Benson in 2026

- Location of Benson in Saskatchewan Benson (Canada)
- Coordinates: 49.446570°N 102.994290°W
- Country: Canada
- Province: Saskatchewan
- Rural Municipality: Benson
- Postal code: S0C 0L0
- Area code: 306
- Highways: Highway 47

Benson is an unincorporated community in the Canadian province of Saskatchewan. It is located between Estevan and Stoughton on Highway 47. Currently it has a curling rink, community hall and the municipal offices of Rural Municipality of Benson No. 35.

== History ==
Most of the early homesteaders in the Benson region arrived between 1898 and 1902.

The Rural Municipality of Benson No. 35 was incorporated in 1909. The municipal offices were built in the community in 1923.

On July 1, 1935, Benson was hit by a tornado, killing 1, injuring 2, and levelling multiple structures.

On August 12, 2003, the village of Benson has been disorganized, making it become part of the RM of Benson No. 35.

== Demographics ==
In the 2021 Census of Population conducted by Statistics Canada, Benson had a population of 95 living in 33 of its 42 total private dwellings, a change of −18.1% from its 2016 population of 116. With a land area of 0.45 km^{2} (0.17 sq mi), it had a population density of 211.1/km^{2} (546.8/sq mi) in 2021.

== Gallery ==
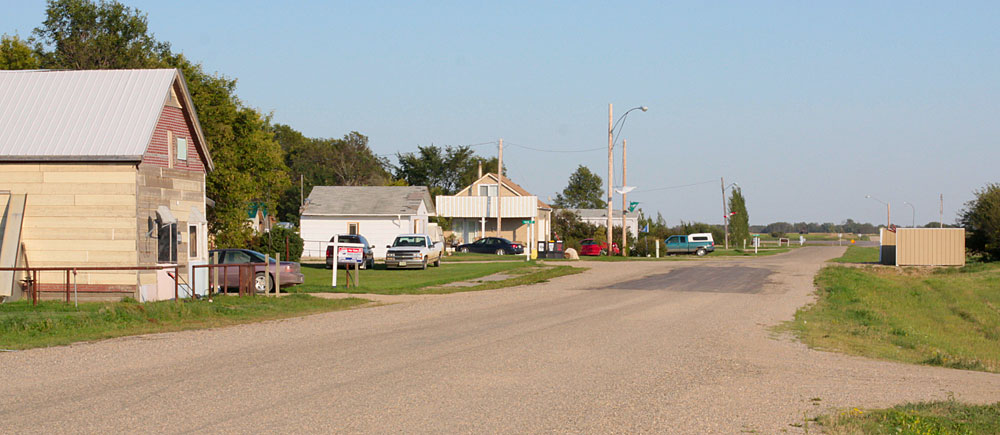
Main Street

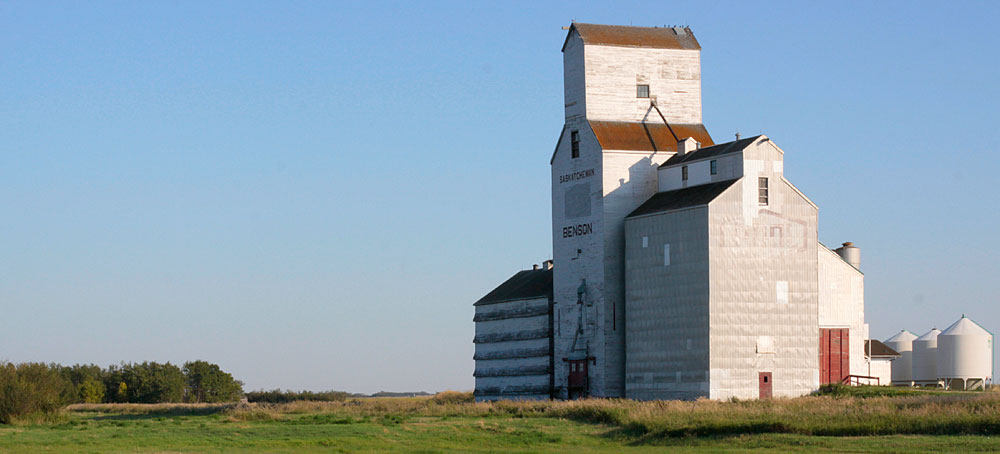
Grain elevator

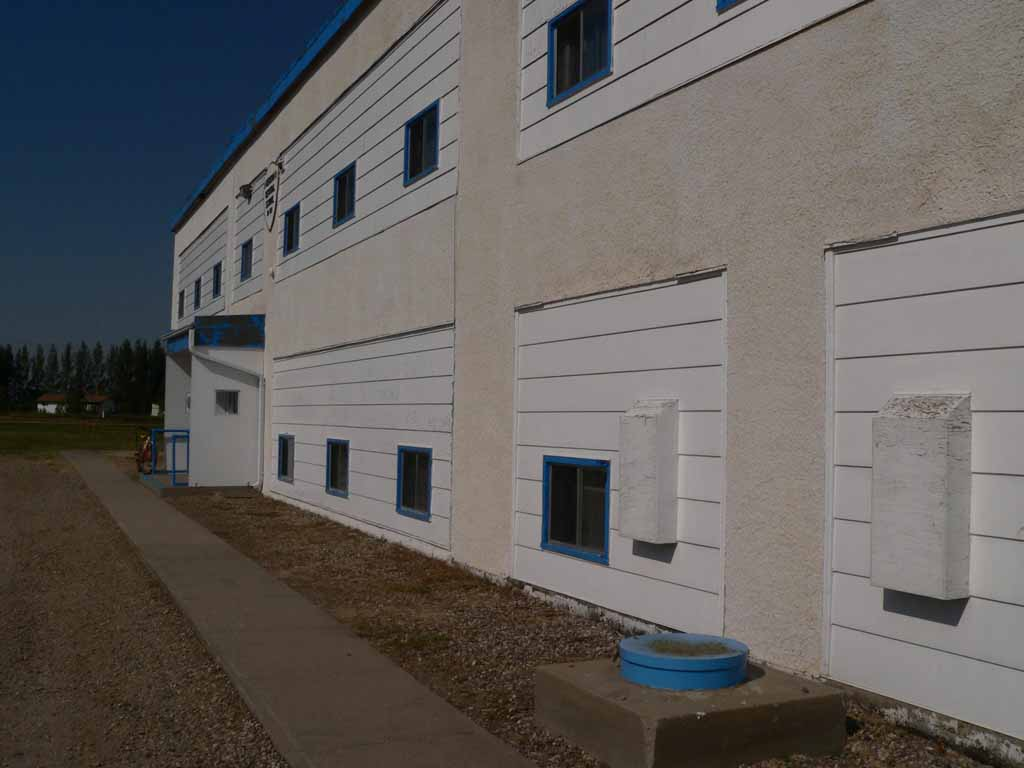
The Benson School in 1995 after it closed

== See also ==
- List of communities in Saskatchewan
