= Gladys Arnold =

Canadian journalist

Gladys Arnold (October 5, 1905 – September 29, 2002) was a Canadian journalist, best known for her work in France for the Canadian Press during World War II. Arnold was born in Macoun, Saskatchewan, Canada.

== Early life ==
Arnold was born in Macoun in 1905. She obtained a teaching certificate in 1925 and was hired at a junior schoolhouse in the remote village of Amulet, Saskatchewan, where she worked from January 1926 to December 1927. She later moved to Winnipeg to study business.

== Career ==
=== Pre-war years ===
Upon graduation from the Success Business College, she accepted a job teaching shorthand. Arnold was hired as a secretary to the editor at the Regina Leader-Post in 1930, worked her way up through the organization and became a reporter. She was promoted to women's page editor in 1934 and started her own column called "It's a Secret, But…", where she wrote about her passion for suffrage, socialism and pacifism, as well as more traditional women's page topics like make-up, fashion and gossip. In her memoir, One Woman's War, Arnold wrote about her desire to move to Europe as a journalist.

As a young reporter with the Regina Leader-Post, I had gone to Europe in 1935, intending to stay for a year or so. My reason for going can be boiled down to two words: political curiosity. Living through the drought and unemployment of the Depression in Saskatchewan, those of us in our twenties passionately debated the pros and cons of socialism, communism, fascism and democracy, searching for answers to why more than a million Canadians could not find a job. In Saskatchewan it was difficult to examine these isms firsthand. But in Europe surely we would find some answers.

The Leader-Post did not share Arnold's priorities. Bob MacRae, Arnold's editor, informed her in a letter in 1936 that: "Only a fraction of our readers get het up about economics and foreign policy… they are more concerned with love, food, the movies, clothes and family affairs." Later that year, Arnold joined the Canadian Press as their Paris correspondent. Over the next four years, she reported from Austria, Belgium, Czechoslovakia, France, Germany, Hungary, Italy, Switzerland, and the Spanish border during the Spanish Civil War.

Arnold recalled that her bosses from the Canadian Press told her: "The boys in the London Bureau will look after the political and military stuff." Similarly, when Arnold asked the French government's Chief Press Officer for the Anglo-American Press to send her to the Maginot Line, he responded: "Mademoiselle, it's impossible. There's no place for a woman on these trips. We can't be responsible." On top of sexism, Arnold faced barriers for being a Canadian. Only British and American reporters were welcomed to briefings at the French War Office.

=== War years ===
Arnold was the sole Canadian correspondent in France at the outbreak of the Second World War in 1939. Arnold left Paris one day before the Nazis invaded. Thousands of refugees marched south alongside her. She took the opportunity to interview them. As the country’s government and infrastructure collapsed, Arnold tried to mail stories. None of them reached their destinations. In an attempt to get her stories censored, a necessary step before publication, Arnold tried to find the French government. When she reached Bordeaux, the British Embassy told Arnold in no uncertain terms to leave the country. She boarded a refugee ship and eventually found safety and mailing services in London.

Once in London, Arnold relayed her experience fleeing France, calling the British and Canadian people to action:

And today, looking upon this heaven after 10 days of agony, seeing buses circulating normally and people going about their Sunday occupations I couldn't help thinking – heaven, yes, but for how long? I wanted to shout to everyone I saw here: "For God's sake wake up, every man and woman, and turn England into a fortress so that what I have seen in those two weeks may never happen here."

Arnold left journalism to work for the Free French Information Service in 1941.

=== Post-war years ===
After the war, Arnold transferred to the French Embassy in Ottawa, where she headed the information service until her retirement in 1971. She died in Regina, Saskatchewan on September 29, 2002.

== Awards ==
France honoured her commitment to the country by making her an honorary brigadier in the French free forces in 1940 and giving her the Legion of Honour in 1975.

== Bibliography ==
- Arnold, Gladys (1987). One Woman's War: A Canadian Reporter with the Free French. Toronto: James Lorimer & Company. ISBN 978-0-88862-875-6.
