= Rural Municipality of Griffin No. 66 =

Rural municipality in Saskatchewan, Canada

Griffin No. 66 Hastings No. 66 (1909–1910)
- Rural municipality
- Rural Municipality of Griffin No. 66
- Location of the RM of Griffin No. 66 in Saskatchewan
- Coordinates: 49.654°N 103.429°W
- Country: Canada
- Province: Saskatchewan
- Census division: 2
- SARM division: 1
- Federal riding: Souris—Moose Mountain
- Provincial riding: Cannington; Weyburn-Big Muddy
- Formed: December 13, 1909
- Name change: January 30, 1910 (from RM of Hastings No. 66)

Government
  - Reeve: Stacey Lund
  - Governing body: RM of Griffin No. 66 Council
  - Administrator: Tawnya Moore
  - Office location: Griffin

Area (2016)
  - Land: 816.59 km^{2} (315.29 sq mi)

Population (2016)
  - Total: 438
  - Density: 0.5/km^{2} (1.3/sq mi)
- Time zone: CST
  - Summer (DST): CST
- Postal code: S0C 1G0
- Area codes: 306 and 639

The Rural Municipality of Griffin No. 66 (2016 population: 438) is a rural municipality (RM) in the Canadian province of Saskatchewan within Census Division No. 2 and SARM Division No. 1.

== History ==
The RM of Hastings No. 66 was originally incorporated as a rural municipality on December 13, 1909. Its name was changed to the RM of Griffin No. 66 on January 30, 1910.

== Geography ==
=== Communities and localities ===
The following unincorporated communities are within the RM.

Special service areas

- Griffin

Localities

- Brough
- Froude
- Hume
- Huntoon
- Innes

== Demographics ==
Population history (1981–2016)
Year	Pop.	±%
1981	587	—
1986	544	−7.3%
1991	465	−14.5%
1996	421	−9.5%
2001	395	−6.2%
2006	334	−15.4%
2011	398	+19.2%
2016	438	+10.1%
Source: Statistics Canada via Saskatchewan Bureau of Statistics

In the 2021 Census of Population conducted by Statistics Canada, the RM of Griffin No. 66 had a population of 430 living in 156 of its 189 total private dwellings, a change of −1.8% from its 2016 population of 438. With a land area of 801.27 km^{2} (309.37 sq mi), it had a population density of 0.5/km^{2} (1.4/sq mi) in 2021.

In the 2016 Census of Population, the RM of Griffin No. 66 recorded a population of 438 living in 163 of its 202 total private dwellings, a 10.1% change from its 2011 population of 398. With a land area of 816.59 km^{2} (315.29 sq mi), it had a population density of 0.5/km^{2} (1.4/sq mi) in 2016.

== Government ==
The RM of Griffin No. 66 is governed by an elected municipal council and an appointed administrator that meets on the second Tuesday of every month. The reeve of the RM is Stacey Lund while its administrator is Tawnya Moore. The RM's office is located in Griffin.

== Transportation ==
Rail

- Weyburn-Stoughton Branch C.P.R. – serves Weyburn, Hume, Griffin, Froude, Stoughton
- Boundary Subdivision CNR — serves Brough, Griffin, Innes, Huntoon, Viewfield.

Roads

- Highway 13—serves Griffin east–west
- Highway 606—serves Griffin north–south

== See also ==
- List of rural municipalities in Saskatchewan
