= Elswick (automobile) =

Automobile manufacturer

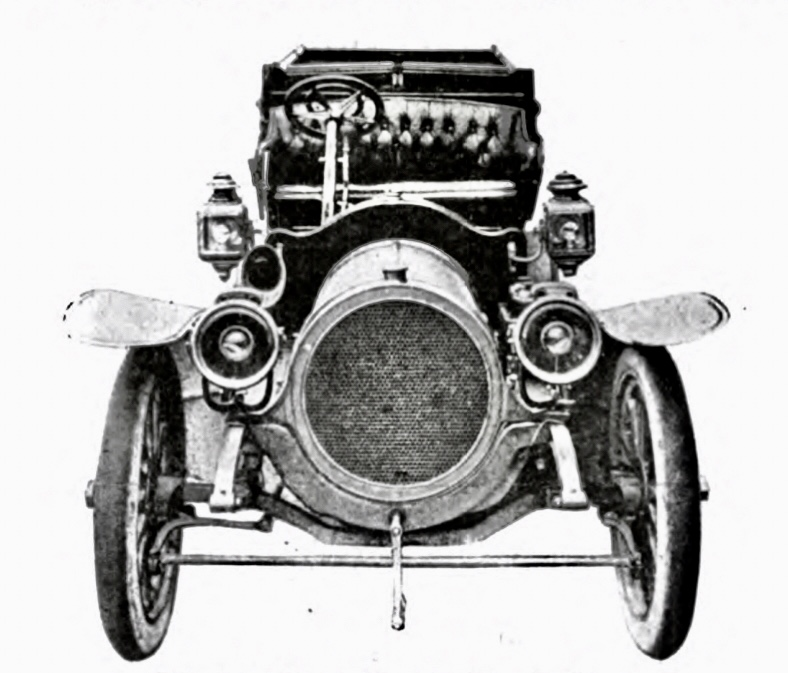
Elswick 26/30 HP

The Elswick was an English automobile produced in Newcastle upon Tyne from 1903 until 1907. The car was built mainly from bought-in parts. The front featured a round radiator.

In 1904, the range offered included a 6 hp single-cylinder model with a De Dion-Bouton engine, a 20 hp with a Brouhot 4-cylinder engine, and 24 hp with a Mutel engine. By 1906, the 20 and 24 hp models seem to have been dropped and alongside the 6 hp single were the four-cylinder 15/20 hp and 24/30 hp and a six-cylinder engine of 26/30 hp. Towards the end of production, manufacture might have moved to London.
