= Macoun, Saskatchewan =

Village in Saskatchewan, Canada

Macoun
- Village
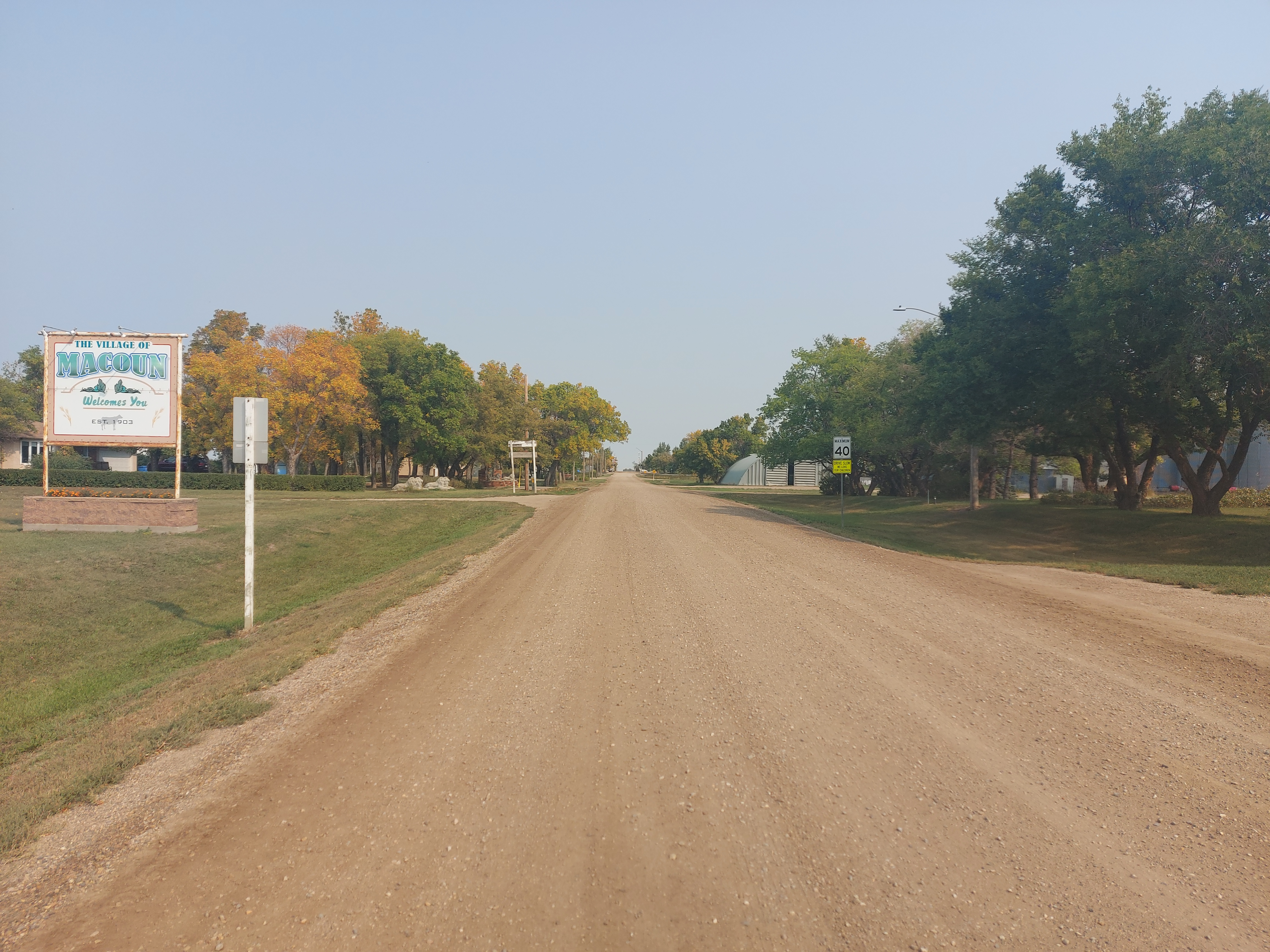
- Macoun, Saskatchewan

- Location of Macoun in Saskatchewan Macoun (Canada)
- Coordinates: 49.293°N 103.279°W
- Country: Canada
- Province: Saskatchewan
- Region: Saskatchewan
- Census division: 2
- Rural Municipality: Cymri No. 36
- Post office Founded: 1903-09-01

Government
  - Mayor: Suzanne Kuchinka
  - Administrator: Carmen Dodd-Vicary
  - Governing body: Macoun Village Council

Area
  - Total: 1.68 km^{2} (0.65 sq mi)

Population (2011)
  - Total: 246
  - Density: 146.1/km^{2} (378/sq mi)
- Time zone: CST
- Postal code: S0C 1P0
- Area code: 306
- Highways: Highway 39

Macoun (2016 population: 269) is a village in the Canadian province of Saskatchewan within the Rural Municipality of Cymri No. 36 and Census Division No. 2. The village is located 28 kilometres (17 mi) northwest of the city of Estevan on Highway 39.

== History ==
After a Soo Line extension in 1898 linked more settled areas of North Dakota, South Dakota and Minnesota with the Canadian Pacific line, a section of land along the rail line became favoured by incoming land seekers, eventually being named Macoun on railway maps.

Macoun incorporated as a village on October 16, 1903. On April 20, 1914, an acetylene gas plant explosion in the cellar of the Macoun Hotel and the resulting fire caused 13 deaths. In the early 1900s acetylene was widely used for illumination.

The village is named for John Macoun, an Irish-born Canadian naturalist, botanist and explorer who studied the prairies on behalf of the Canadian government.

== Demographics ==
Population history (1981–2016)
Year	Pop.	±%
1981	190	—
1986	178	−6.3%
1991	157	−11.8%
1996	148	−5.7%
2001	170	+14.9%
2006	168	−1.2%
2011	246	+46.4%
2016	269	+9.3%
Source: Statistics Canada via Saskatchewan Bureau of Statistics

In the 2021 Census of Population conducted by Statistics Canada, Macoun had a population of 272 living in 109 of its 118 total private dwellings, a change of 1.1% from its 2016 population of 269. With a land area of 1.7 km^{2} (0.66 sq mi), it had a population density of 160.0/km^{2} (414.4/sq mi) in 2021.

In the 2016 Census of Population, the Village of Macoun recorded a population of 269 living in 103 of its 119 total private dwellings, a 8.6% change from its 2011 population of 246. With a land area of 1.68 km^{2} (0.65 sq mi), it had a population density of 160.1/km^{2} (414.7/sq mi) in 2016.

== Notable residents ==
Notable people from Macoun include:

- Lenard Gustafson, Canadian senator
- Kim Thorson, politician
- Gladys Arnold, Journalist

== See also ==
- List of communities in Saskatchewan
- List of villages in Saskatchewan
