= Halbrite =

Village in Saskatchewan, Canada

- Village
- Village of Halbrite
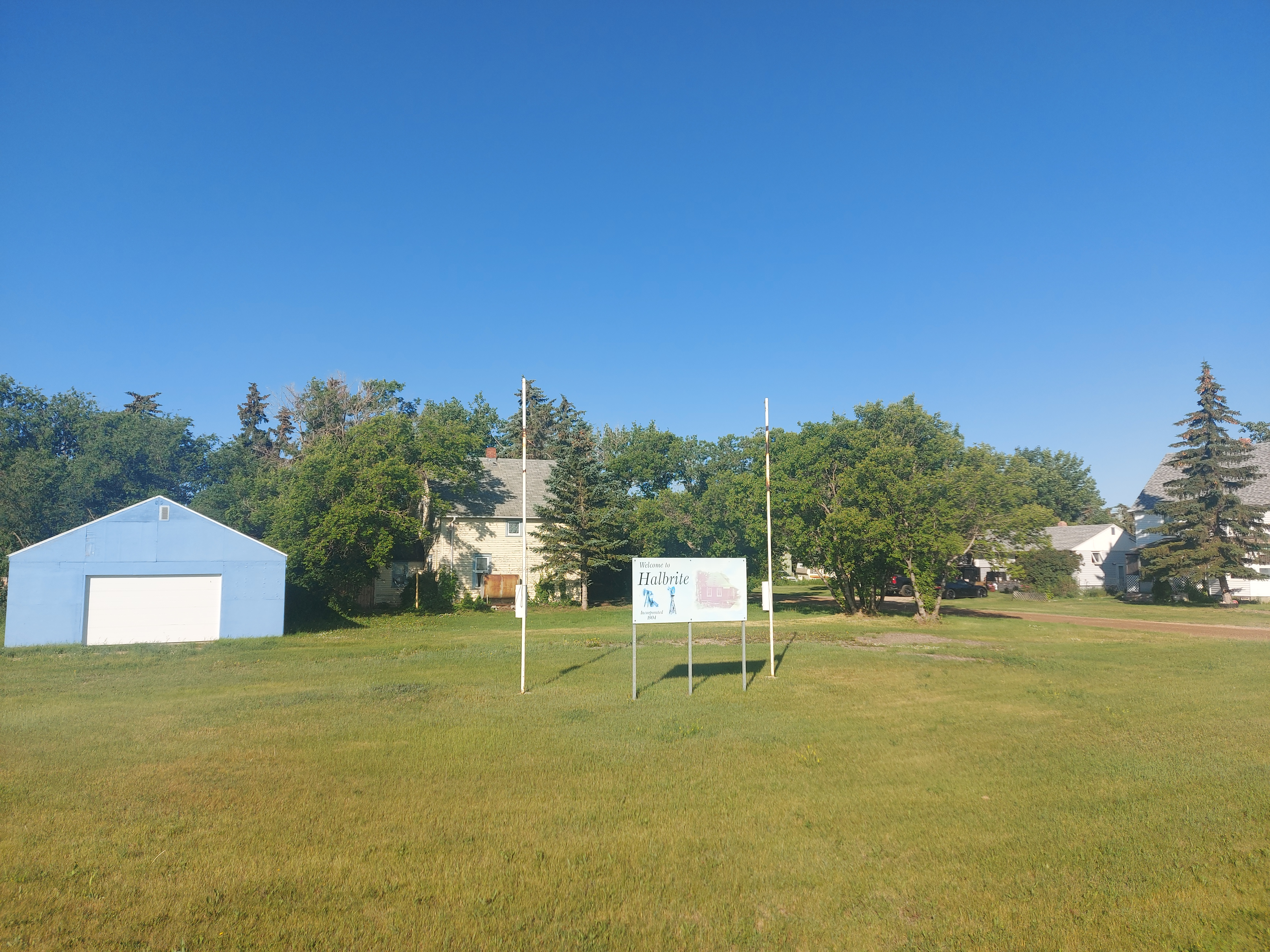
- Halbrite

- Location of Halbrite in Saskatchewan Halbrite (Canada)
- Coordinates: 49.488°N 103.558°W
- Country: Canada
- Province: Saskatchewan
- Region: Southeast
- Census division: 2
- Rural municipality: Cymri No. 36

Government
  - Type: Municipal
  - Governing body: Halbrite Village Council
  - Mayor: Palmer Bruce
  - Administrator: Aleshia Underwood
  - MP: Robert Kitchen
  - MLA: Dan D'Autremont

Area
  - Total: 1.20 km^{2} (0.46 sq mi)

Population (2016)
  - Total: 119
  - Density: 99.3/km^{2} (257/sq mi)
- Time zone: UTC-6 (CST)
- Postal code: S0C 1H0
- Area code: 306
- Highways: Highway 39 Highway 606 Highway 705
- Railways: Canadian Pacific Railway

Halbrite (2016 population: 119) is a village in the Canadian province of Saskatchewan within the Rural Municipality of Cymri No. 36 and Census Division No. 2. The village is approximately 20 kilometres (12 mi) south-east of the city of Weyburn on Highway 39 at the intersections of Highway 606 and Highway 705.

Halbrite gets its name from three engineers who, at the time, worked with the Canadian Pacific Railway. Each contributed parts of their last names to make up the community's name: Hall, Bruce, and White.

During the Second World War the Royal Canadian Air Force constructed a Relief Landing Field for RCAF Station Weyburn approximately 2 miles south of the village.

== History ==
Halbrite incorporated as a village on February 26, 1904.

== Demographics ==
Population history (1981–2016)
Year	Pop.	±%
1981	125	—
1986	136	+8.8%
1991	111	−18.4%
1996	111	+0.0%
2001	109	−1.8%
2006	98	−10.1%
2011	108	+10.2%
2016	119	+10.2%
Source: Statistics Canada via Saskatchewan Bureau of Statistics

In the 2021 Census of Population conducted by Statistics Canada, Halbrite had a population of 110 living in 49 of its 60 total private dwellings, a change of −7.6% from its 2016 population of 119. With a land area of 1.1 km^{2} (0.42 sq mi), it had a population density of 100.0/km^{2} (259.0/sq mi) in 2021.

In the 2016 Census of Population, the Village of Halbrite recorded a population of 119 living in 51 of its 55 total private dwellings, a 9.2% change from its 2011 population of 108. With a land area of 1.2 km^{2} (0.46 sq mi), it had a population density of 99.2/km^{2} (256.8/sq mi) in 2016.

== See also ==
- List of communities in Saskatchewan
- List of villages in Saskatchewan
- List of geographic acronyms and initialisms
