= Valley Centre =

Community in Saskatchewan, Canada

Valley Centre is an unincorporated community in Marriott Rural Municipality 317, Saskatchewan, Canada. The community is located southeast of the Town of Biggar and northeast of the Town of Rosetown, along Highway 768.

== See also ==
- List of communities in Saskatchewan
