= Rural Municipality of Senlac No. 411 =

Rural municipality in Saskatchewan, Canada

Senlac No. 411
- Rural municipality
- Rural Municipality of Senlac No. 411
- Location of the RM of Senlac No. 411 in Saskatchewan
- Coordinates: 52.549°N 109.687°W
- Country: Canada
- Province: Saskatchewan
- Census division: 13
- SARM division: 6
- Formed: January 1, 1913

Government
  - Reeve: Ryan Manchester
  - Governing body: RM of Senlac No. 411 Council
  - Administrator: Sheila Noble
  - Office location: Senlac

Area (2016)
  - Land: 1,026.75 km^{2} (396.43 sq mi)

Population (2016)
  - Total: 216
  - Density: 0.2/km^{2} (0.52/sq mi)
- Time zone: CST
  - Summer (DST): CST
- Postal code: S0L 2Y0
- Area codes: 306 and 639
- Highway(s): Highway 14; Highway 675; Highway 787

The Rural Municipality of Senlac No. 411 (2016 population: 216) is a rural municipality (RM) in the Canadian province of Saskatchewan within Census Division No. 13 and SARM Division No. 6. Located in the west-central portion of the province, it is adjacent to the Alberta boundary.

== History ==
The RM of Senlac No. 411 incorporated as a rural municipality on January 1, 1913.

== Geography ==
The RM of Senlac is located along the western border of Saskatchewan in a region called the Prairie Pothole Region of North America, which extends throughout three Canadian provinces and five U.S. states. It is also within Palliser's Triangle and the Great Plains ecoregion. The RM is characterised by potholes, small lakes, rolling hills, and grasslands. Along the very northern edge of the RM are the Manitou Sand Hills.

=== Communities and localities ===
The following urban municipalities are surrounded by the RM.

Villages

- Senlac

The following unincorporated communities are within the RM.

Localities

- Rutland
- Winter
- Yonker

=== Lakes and rivers ===
The following is a list of notable lakes and rivers in the RM:

- Little Manitou Lake (not to be confused with the Little Manitou Lake in the eastern part of Saskatchewan)
- Suffern Lake
- Freshwater Lake
- Reflex Lakes
- Drake Lake
- Morse Lake
- Devitt Lake
- Eyehill Creek

== Suffern Lake Regional Park ==
Suffern Lake Regional Park (52.6405°N 109.898°W) was established in 1967 on Suffern Lake to commemorate the Canadian Centennial. Suffern Lake was originally named Fish Lake but was renamed Suffern Lake after Jack Suffern, who was the forest ranger for the area from 1914 to 1945. In 1975, a second section of the park was added on the north-west corner of Manitou Lake. In 2019, that section became its own regional park called Big Manitou Regional Park.

The park has a campground with 56 campsites, golf course, volleyball court, horseshoe pits, and a bunnock court. The golf course, built in 2981, is a 9-hole, artificial greens course. It is a par 33 with 2,438 yards.

== Demographics ==
Population history (1981–2016)
Year	Pop.	±%
1981	388	—
1986	406	+4.6%
1991	360	−11.3%
1996	296	−17.8%
2001	238	−19.6%
2006	225	−5.5%
2011	195	−13.3%
2016	216	+10.8%
Source: Statistics Canada via Saskatchewan Bureau of Statistics

In the 2021 Census of Population conducted by Statistics Canada, the RM of Senlac No. 411 had a population of 198 living in 83 of its 143 total private dwellings, a change of −8.3% from its 2016 population of 216. With a land area of 1,007.3 km^{2} (388.9 sq mi), it had a population density of 0.2/km^{2} (0.5/sq mi) in 2021.

In the 2016 Census of Population, the RM of Senlac No. 411 recorded a population of 216 living in 100 of its 155 total private dwellings, a 10.8% change from its 2011 population of 195. With a land area of 1,026.75 km^{2} (396.43 sq mi), it had a population density of 0.2/km^{2} (0.5/sq mi) in 2016.

== Government ==
The RM of Senlac No. 411 is governed by an elected municipal council and an appointed administrator that meets on the second Wednesday of every month. The reeve of the RM is Ryan Manchester while its administrator is Sheila Noble. The RM's office is located in Senlac.

== Transportation ==
The following is a list of Saskatchewan highways in the RM:

- Highway 787—serving Senlac, SK and Winter
- Highway 680
- Highway 14
- Highway 675—serving Winter, SK
- Highway 17—runs along the Saskatchewan / Alberta border

== See also ==
- List of rural municipalities in Saskatchewan
