= Rural Municipality of Redburn No. 130 =

Rural municipality in Saskatchewan, Canada

Redburn No. 130
- Rural municipality
- Rural Municipality of Redburn No. 130
- Location of the RM of Redburn No. 130 in Saskatchewan
- Coordinates: 50.178°N 105.101°W
- Country: Canada
- Province: Saskatchewan
- Census division: 6
- SARM division: 2
- Formed: January 1, 1913

Government
  - Reeve: Doug THUL
  - Governing body: RM of Redburn No. 130 Council
  - Administrator: Guy Lagrandeur
  - Office location: Rouleau

Area (2016)
  - Land: 847.95 km^{2} (327.40 sq mi)

Population (2016)
  - Total: 250
  - Density: 0.3/km^{2} (0.78/sq mi)
- Time zone: CST
  - Summer (DST): CST
- Postal code: S0G 4H0
- Area codes: 306 and 639
- Highway(s): Highway 39; Highway 339; Highway 623; Highway 714; Highway 716
- Waterway(s): Moose Jaw River

The Rural Municipality of Redburn No. 130 (2016 population: 250) is a rural municipality (RM) in the Canadian province of Saskatchewan within Census Division No. 6 and SARM Division No. 2. It is located southeast of the city of Moose Jaw in the south-central portion region of the province.

== History ==
The RM of Redburn No. 130 incorporated as a rural municipality on January 1, 1913.

== Geography ==
=== Communities and localities ===
The following urban municipalities are surrounded by the RM.

Towns

- Rouleau

Villages

- Briercrest
- Drinkwater

The following unincorporated communities are within the RM.

Localities

- Hearne
- Pitman

== Demographics ==
Population history (1981–2016)
Year	Pop.	±%
1981	375	—
1986	373	−0.5%
1991	336	−9.9%
1996	313	−6.8%
2001	279	−10.9%
2006	245	−12.2%
2011	250	+2.0%
2016	250	+0.0%
Source: Statistics Canada via Saskatchewan Bureau of Statistics

In the 2021 Census of Population conducted by Statistics Canada, the RM of Redburn No. 130 had a population of 253 living in 93 of its 103 total private dwellings, a change of 1.2% from its 2016 population of 250. With a land area of 845.89 km^{2} (326.60 sq mi), it had a population density of 0.3/km^{2} (0.8/sq mi) in 2021.

In the 2016 Census of Population, the RM of Redburn No. 130 recorded a population of 250 living in 94 of its 107 total private dwellings, a 0% change from its 2011 population of 250. With a land area of 847.95 km^{2} (327.40 sq mi), it had a population density of 0.3/km^{2} (0.8/sq mi) in 2016.

== Government ==
The RM of Redburn No. 130 is governed by an elected municipal council and an appointed administrator that meets on the second Thursday of every month. The reeve of the RM is Ronald Hughes while its administrator is Guy Lagrandeur. The RM's office is located in Rouleau.

== See also ==
- List of rural municipalities in Saskatchewan
