= Rural Municipality of Marriott No. 317 =

Rural municipality in Saskatchewan, Canada

Marriott No. 317
- Rural municipality
- Rural Municipality of Marriott No. 317
- Location of the RM of Marriott No. 317 in Saskatchewan
- Coordinates: 51.751°N 107.918°W
- Country: Canada
- Province: Saskatchewan
- Census division: 12
- SARM division: 6
- Formed: December 12, 1910

Government
  - Reeve: Orville Minish
  - Governing body: RM of Marriott No. 317 Council
  - Administrator: Jill Palichuk
  - Office location: Rosetown

Area (2016)
  - Land: 843.29 km^{2} (325.60 sq mi)

Population (2016)
  - Total: 366
  - Density: 0.4/km^{2} (1.0/sq mi)
- Time zone: CST
  - Summer (DST): CST
- Postal code: S0N 0P0
- Area codes: 306 and 639
- Highway(s): Highway 7 Highway 664; Highway 768

The Rural Municipality of Marriott No. 317 (2016 population: 366) is a rural municipality (RM) in the Canadian province of Saskatchewan within Census Division No. 12 and SARM Division No. 6.

== History ==
The RM of Marriott No. 317 incorporated as a rural municipality on December 12, 1910.

== Geography ==
=== Communities and localities ===
The following unincorporated communities are within the RM.

Localities

- Bents (Note: Bents is no longer populated.)
- Malmgren
- Marriott
- Valley Centre

== Demographics ==
Population history (1981–2016)
Year	Pop.	±%
1981	627	—
1986	631	+0.6%
1991	598	−5.2%
1996	493	−17.6%
2001	446	−9.5%
2006	410	−8.1%
2011	372	−9.3%
2016	366	−1.6%
Source: Statistics Canada via Saskatchewan Bureau of Statistics

In the 2021 Census of Population conducted by Statistics Canada, the RM of Marriott No. 317 had a population of 349 living in 114 of its 135 total private dwellings, a change of −4.6% from its 2016 population of 366. With a land area of 832.54 km^{2} (321.45 sq mi), it had a population density of 0.4/km^{2} (1.1/sq mi) in 2021.

In the 2016 Census of Population, the RM of Marriott No. 317 recorded a population of 366 living in 124 of its 142 total private dwellings, a −1.6% change from its 2011 population of 372. With a land area of 843.29 km^{2} (325.60 sq mi), it had a population density of 0.4/km^{2} (1.1/sq mi) in 2016.

== Government ==
The RM of Marriott No. 317 is governed by an elected municipal council and an appointed administrator that meets on the second Tuesday of every month. The reeve of the RM is Orville Minish while its administrator is Jill Palichuk. The RM's office is located in Rosetown.

== See also ==
- List of rural municipalities in Saskatchewan
