= Rutland, Saskatchewan =

Rutland
- Location within Saskatchewan
- Coordinates: 52.5163375°N 109.5402503°W
- Country: Canada
- Province: Saskatchewan
- Census division: 13
- Rural Municipality: Senlac
- Time zone: CST
- Area code: 306
- Highways: 675, 787

Rutland is an unincorporated locality in Senlac Rural Municipality No. 411, Saskatchewan, Canada.

== See also ==
- List of communities in Saskatchewan
- List of ghost towns in Saskatchewan
