= Senlac, Saskatchewan =

Village in Saskatchewan, Canada

Senlac
- Location within Saskatchewan Location within Canada
- Coordinates: 52.293542°N 109.422925°W
- Country: Canada
- Province: Saskatchewan
- Region: Southwest
- Census division: 13
- Rural municipality: Senlac No. 411

Area
  - Total: 0.60 km^{2} (0.23 sq mi)

Population (2011)
  - Total: 66
  - Density: 77.2/km^{2} (200/sq mi)
- Time zone: CST
- Area code: 306

Senlac (2016 population: 41) is a village in the Canadian province of Saskatchewan within the Rural Municipality of Senlac No. 411 and Census Division No. 13. The village was named after Senlac Hill, the location of the Battle of Hastings in England in 1066.

== History ==
Senlac incorporated as a village on October 11, 1916.

== Demographics ==
Population history (1981–2016)
Year	Pop.	±%
1981	96	—
1986	105	+9.4%
1991	94	−10.5%
1996	78	−17.0%
2001	50	−35.9%
2006	45	−10.0%
2011	46	+2.2%
2016	41	−10.9%
Source: Statistics Canada via Saskatchewan Bureau of Statistics

In the 2021 Census of Population conducted by Statistics Canada, Senlac had a population of 36 living in 18 of its 26 total private dwellings, a change of −12.2% from its 2016 population of 41. With a land area of 0.66 km^{2} (0.25 sq mi), it had a population density of 54.5/km^{2} (141.3/sq mi) in 2021.

In the 2016 Census of Population, the Village of Senlac recorded a population of 41 living in 22 of its 31 total private dwellings, a −12.2% change from its 2011 population of 46. With a land area of 0.6 km^{2} (0.23 sq mi), it had a population density of 68.3/km^{2} (177.0/sq mi) in 2016.

== Notable people ==
- Curtis Brown — former professional ice hockey player in the NHL.

== See also ==
- List of communities in Saskatchewan
- List of villages in Saskatchewan
