= Rural Municipality of Benson No. 35 =

Rural municipality in Saskatchewan, Canada

Benson No. 35
- Rural municipality
- Rural Municipality of Benson No. 35
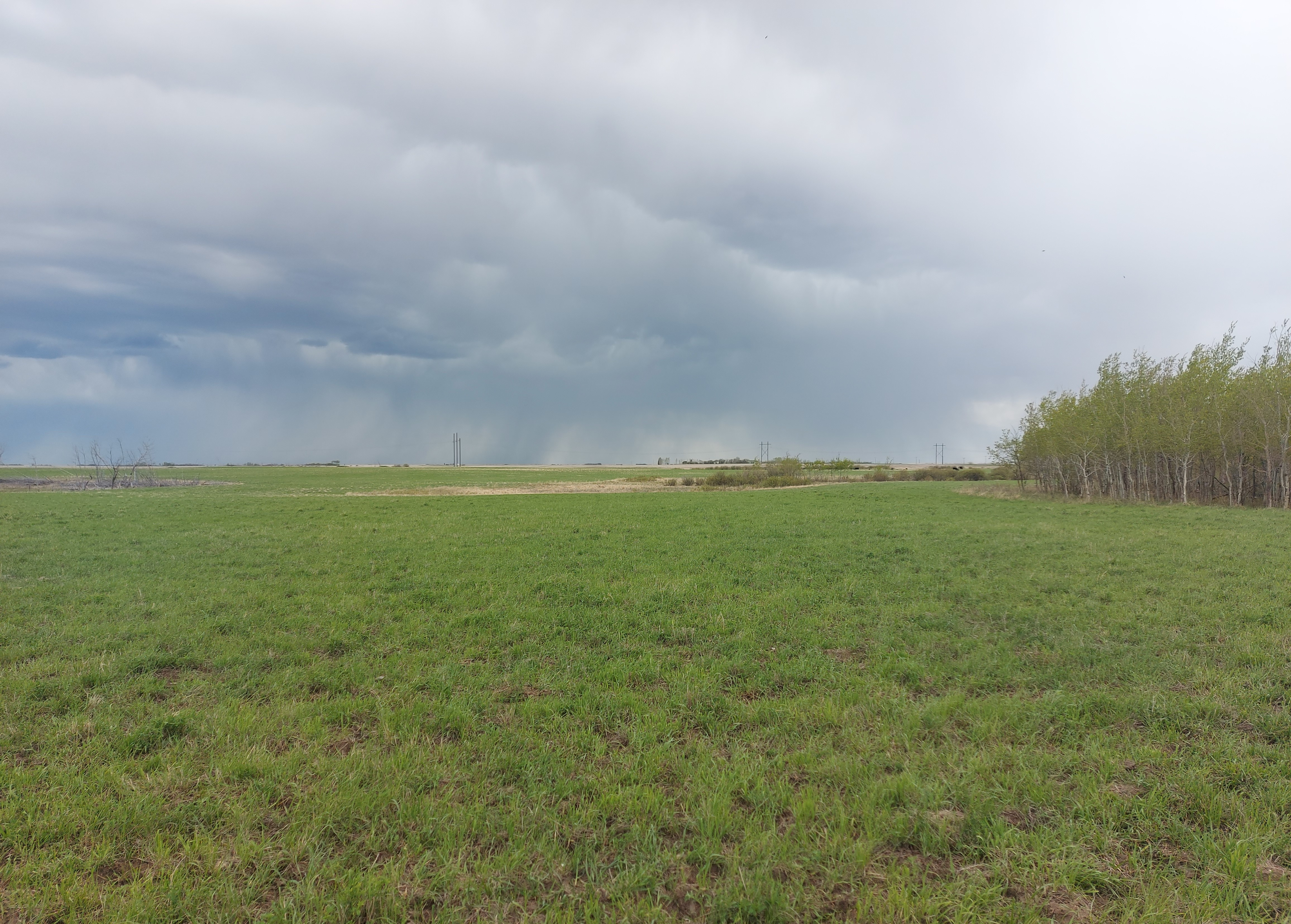

- Location of the RM of Benson No. 35 in Saskatchewan
- Coordinates: 49.392°N 103.016°W
- Country: Canada
- Province: Saskatchewan
- Census division: 1
- SARM division: 1
- Federal riding: Souris—Moose Mountain
- Provincial riding: Cannington; Estevan
- Formed: December 13, 1909

Government
  - Reeve: David Hoffort
  - Governing body: RM of Benson No. 35 Council
  - Administrator: Chantel Walsh
  - Office location: Benson

Area (2016)
  - Land: 836.39 km^{2} (322.93 sq mi)

Population (2016)
  - Total: 472
  - Density: 0.6/km^{2} (1.6/sq mi)
- Time zone: CST
  - Summer (DST): CST
- Postal code: S0C 0L0
- Area codes: 306 and 639

The Rural Municipality of Benson No. 35 (2016 population: 472) is a rural municipality (RM) in the Canadian province of Saskatchewan within Census Division No. 1 and SARM Division No. 1. It is located in the southeast portion of the province.

== History ==
The RM of Benson No. 35 incorporated as a rural municipality on December 13, 1909.

Heritage properties

There is one historical property within the RM.

- St. Luke's Lutheran Church - Constructed in 1929, in the hamlet of Woodley, Saskatchewan.

== Geography ==
=== Communities and localities ===
The following unincorporated communities are within the RM.

Localities

- Benson
- Bryant
- Cullen
- Woodley

== Demographics ==
Population history (1981–2016)
Year	Pop.	±%
1981	651	—
1986	595	−8.6%
1991	496	−16.6%
1996	435	−12.3%
2001	387	−11.0%
2006	434	+12.1%
2011	490	+12.9%
2016	472	−3.7%
Source: Statistics Canada via Saskatchewan Bureau of Statistics

In the 2021 Census of Population conducted by Statistics Canada, the RM of Benson No. 35 had a population of 450 living in 171 of its 212 total private dwellings, a change of −4.7% from its 2016 population of 472. With a land area of 808.53 km^{2} (312.18 sq mi), it had a population density of 0.6/km^{2} (1.4/sq mi) in 2021.

In the 2016 Census of Population, the RM of Benson No. 35 recorded a population of 472 living in 177 of its 196 total private dwellings, a −3.7% change from its 2011 population of 490. With a land area of 836.39 km^{2} (322.93 sq mi), it had a population density of 0.6/km^{2} (1.5/sq mi) in 2016.

== Economy ==
Agriculture plays an important role in the rural municipality with 207,200 acres (95%) of land in under cultivation. There are also 300 oil wells in the municipality.

== Government ==
The RM of Benson No. 35 is governed by an elected municipal council and an appointed administrator that meets on the first Friday of every month. The reeve of the RM is David Hoffort while its administrator is Chantel Walsh. The RM's office is located in Benson.

== Transportation ==
The two airports within the rural municipality are the Estevan (Blue Sky) Aerodrome and Estevan/Bryant Airport.
