= Bryant, Saskatchewan =

Bryant
- Unincorporated community
- Location within Saskatchewan
- Coordinates: 49.3481°N 102.99316°W
- Country: Canada
- Province: Saskatchewan
- Region: Southeast Saskatchewan
- Census division: 1
- Rural Municipality: Benson
- Established: 1911

Government
  - Reeve: David Hoffort
  - Administrator: Laureen Keating
  - Governing body: Benson No. 35
- Time zone: CST
- Postal code: S0C 0L0
- Area code: 306
- Highways: Highway 702

Bryant is an unincorporated community in Benson Rural Municipality No. 35, Saskatchewan, Canada. The community is located on Highway 702, approximately 20 km (12 mi) west of Lampman and 20 km (12 mi) north of Estevan. Bryant gets its name from Quaker poet, journalist, and editor William Cullen Bryant.

== See also ==
- List of communities in Saskatchewan
