= Crystal Falls, Quebec =

Coordinates: 46°02′39″N 74°36′28″W

Crystal Falls was a small community that existed midway between St. Jovite and Arundel on Route 327 in the province of Quebec, Canada. The community no longer exists but can still be found in the Toponomie Quebec of the province of Quebec. There was a post office, a school, a cheese factory, a combination water-powered grist and sawmill and a Presbyterian Church - Knox Church Crystal Falls.

All that remains of the original settlement is the church which is now maintained by the Knox Church Crystal Falls Memorial Fund - a non-profit charitable organization dedicated to the preservation of the church and cemetery at Crystal Falls. The mill burned in 1919 and the post office is now a private home.

In September 2002, a ceremony was held to illuminate Knox Church Crystal Falls. The church is to be perpetually lit at night as a beacon along Route 327. On May 29, 2021, the church was burned to the ground by vandals.
