= Rural Municipality of Cymri No. 36 =

Rural municipality in Saskatchewan, Canada

Cymri No. 36
- Rural municipality
- Rural Municipality of Cymri No. 36
- Location of the RM of Cymri No. 36 in Saskatchewan
- Coordinates: 49.412°N 103.407°W
- Country: Canada
- Province: Saskatchewan
- Census division: 2
- SARM division: 1
- Federal riding: Souris—Moose Mountain
- Provincial riding: Estevan
- Formed: December 13, 1909

Government
  - Reeve: Brad Eggum
  - Governing body: RM of Cymri No. 36 Council
  - Administrator: Sarah Leck
  - Office location: Midale

Area (2016)
  - Land: 832.32 km^{2} (321.36 sq mi)

Population (2016)
  - Total: 549
  - Density: 0.7/km^{2} (1.8/sq mi)
- Time zone: CST
  - Summer (DST): CST
- Postal code: S0C 1S0
- Area codes: 306 and 639
- Website: Official website

The Rural Municipality of Cymri No. 36 (2016 population: 549) is a rural municipality (RM) in the Canadian province of Saskatchewan within Census Division No. 2 and SARM Division No. 1. It is located in the southeast portion of the province.

== History ==
The RM of Cymri No. 36 incorporated as a rural municipality on December 13, 1909.

Heritage properties

There is one historical property located within the RM.

- Steven Peterson Residence - Constructed in 1916 as the Gustav Peterson Residence, in Halbrite. The residence also functioned as a community meeting place.

== Geography ==
=== Communities and localities ===
The following urban municipalities are surrounded by the RM.

Towns

- Midale

Villages

- Halbrite
- Macoun

The following unincorporated communities are within the RM.

Localities

- Blewett

== Demographics ==
Population history (1981–2016)
Year	Pop.	±%
1981	601	—
1986	572	−4.8%
1991	531	−7.2%
1996	517	−2.6%
2001	510	−1.4%
2006	455	−10.8%
2011	524	+15.2%
2016	549	+4.8%
Source: Statistics Canada via Saskatchewan Bureau of Statistics

In the 2021 Census of Population conducted by Statistics Canada, the RM of Cymri No. 36 had a population of 568 living in 231 of its 281 total private dwellings, a change of 3.5% from its 2016 population of 549. With a land area of 816.38 km^{2} (315.21 sq mi), it had a population density of 0.7/km^{2} (1.8/sq mi) in 2021.

In the 2016 Census of Population, the RM of Cymri No. 36 recorded a population of 549 living in 212 of its 287 total private dwellings, a 4.8% change from its 2011 population of 524. With a land area of 832.32 km^{2} (321.36 sq mi), it had a population density of 0.7/km^{2} (1.7/sq mi) in 2016.

== Attractions ==
The RM includes the Mainprize Regional Park.

== Government ==
The RM of Cymri No. 36 is governed by an elected municipal council and an appointed administrator that meets on the second Monday of every month. The reeve of the RM is Brad Eggum while its administrator is Sarah Leck. The RM's office is located in Midale.
