= Lists of ghost towns in Canada =

Ghost towns in Canada by province or territory

This is a list of lists of ghost towns in Canada. A ghost town is a town that once had a considerable population, that has since dwindled in numbers causing some or all its business to close, either due to the rerouting of a highway, train tracks being pulled, or exhaustion of some natural resource.

- List of ghost towns in Alberta
- List of ghost towns in British Columbia
- List of ghost towns in Manitoba
- List of ghost towns in Newfoundland and Labrador
- List of ghost towns in the Northwest Territories
- List of ghost towns in Nova Scotia
- List of ghost towns in Nunavut
- List of ghost towns in Ontario
- List of ghost towns in Quebec
- List of ghost towns in Saskatchewan
- List of ghost towns in Yukon
