= Saskatchewan Highway 377 =

Provincial highway in Saskatchewan, Canada

Highway 377

Route information
- Maintained by Ministry of Highways and Infrastructure
- Length: 22.9 km (14.2 mi)

Major junctions
- West end: Highway 6 at Ceylon
- East end: Highway 28 in Radville

Location
- Country: Canada
- Province: Saskatchewan
- Rural municipalities: The Gap, Laurier

Highway system
- Provincial highways in Saskatchewan
| ← Highway 376 | → Highway 378 |

Highway 377 is a provincial highway in the Canadian province of Saskatchewan. It runs from Highway 6 at Ceylon to Highway 28 in Radville and Riverside. It is about 23 kilometres (14 mi) long.

Highway 377 provides access to both Ceylon Regional Park and Radville-Laurier Regional Park.

== Route description ==
Hwy 377 begins in the Rural Municipality of The Gap No. 39 at an intersection with Hwy 6 along the northern boundary of the village of Ceylon, directly beside of a railway crossing. It heads due east, having an intersection with First Street before leaving the village and curving around a lake, where it passes by Ceylon Regional Park. The highway continues through rural farmland and some rolling hills for the next several kilometres, running parallel to Canadian Pacific Railway's Radville subdivision (which it crosses once) as it enters the Rural Municipality of Laurier No. 38. Running to the south of the remnants of the former hamlet of Brooking, and entering the town of Radville along Labbie Street, Hwy 376 travels past a hospital and passes through neighbourhoods before curving onto Railway Avenue and entering downtown, having an intersection with Main Street in the centre of town (provides access to Radville-Laurier Regional Park) before coming to an end at an intersection with Hwy 28 (Railway Avenue / Anderson Avenue). The entire length of Hwy 377 is a paved, two-lane highway.

== Major intersections ==
From west to east:

| Rural municipality | Location | km | mi | Destinations | Notes |
|---|---|---|---|---|---|
| The Gap No. 39 | Ceylon | 0.0 | 0.0 | Highway 6 – Regina, Port of Regway Township Road 62 – Hardy | Western terminus; road continues across railway crossing as Township Road 62 |
| The Gap No. 39 | Ceylon | 0.8 | 0.50 | First Street – Ceylon | |
| The Gap No. 39 | | 1.8 | 1.1 | Ceylon Regional Park access road | |
| Laurier No. 38 | Radville | 22.8 | 14.2 | Main Street – Radville-Laurier Regional Park | |
| Laurier No. 38 | Radville | 22.9 | 14.2 | Highway 28 (Anderson Avenue / Railway Avenue) – Trossachs, Lake Alma | Eastern terminus; road continues south as southbound Hwy 28 |
1.000 mi = 1.609 km; 1.000 km = 0.621 mi

== See also ==
- Transportation in Saskatchewan
- Roads in Saskatchewan
