= Saskatchewan Highway 28 =

Provincial highway in Saskatchewan, Canada

Highway 28
- Highway 28 highlighted in red
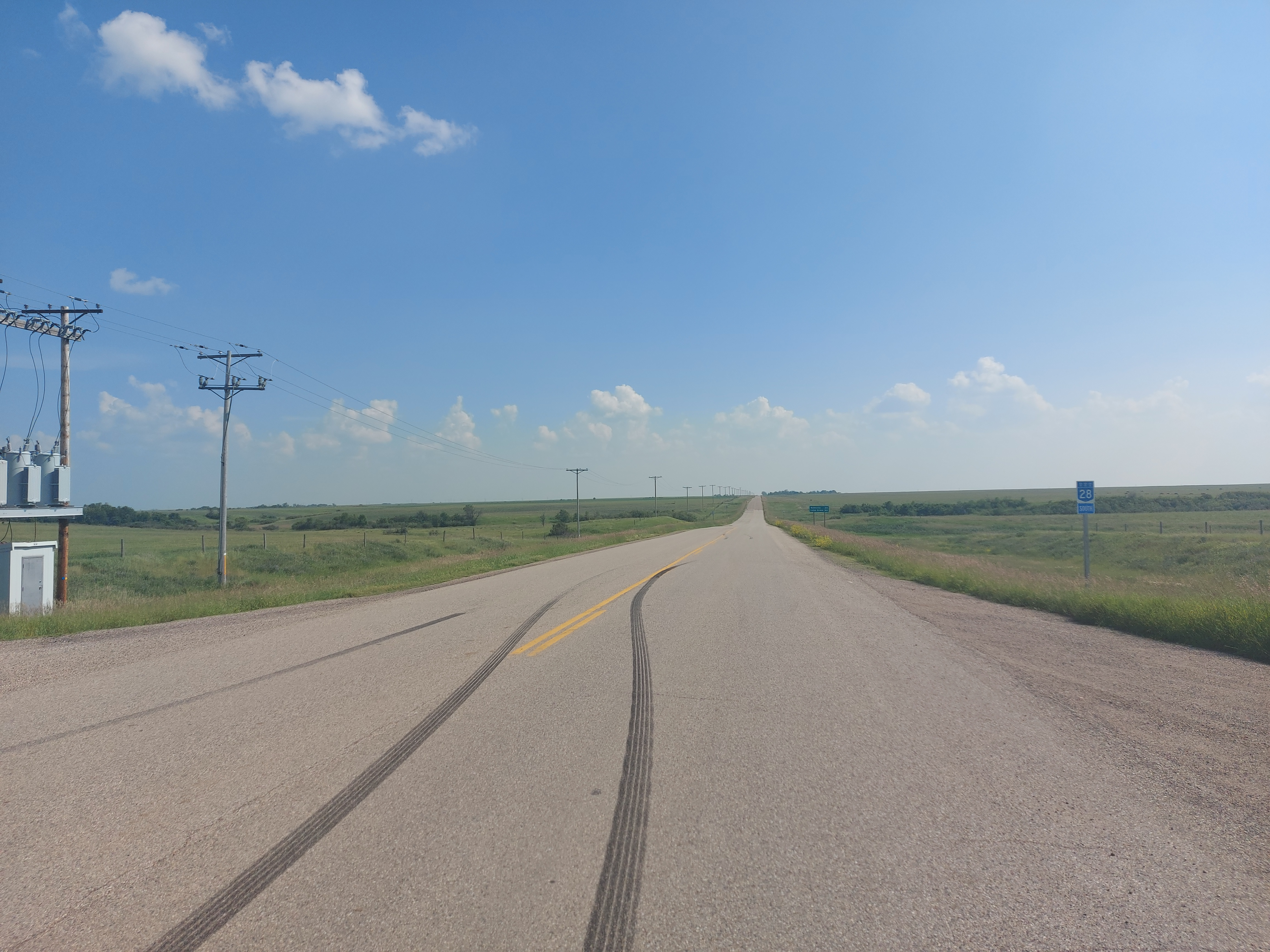
- Highway 28

Route information
- Maintained by Ministry of Highways and Infrastructure
- Length: 59.8 km (37.2 mi)

Major junctions
- South end: Highway 18 at Lake Alma
- Highway 377 in Radville
- North end: Highway 13 near Trossachs

Location
- Country: Canada
- Province: Saskatchewan
- Rural municipalities: Lake Alma, Laurier, Brokenshell
- Towns: Radville

Highway system
- Provincial highways in Saskatchewan
← Highway 27	→ Highway 29

Highway 28 is a provincial highway in Saskatchewan, Canada. It runs from Highway 18 west of Lake Alma north to Highway 13 west of Trossachs. Radville is the only town along the highway's route. It is about 60 kilometres (37 mi) long.

== History ==
Highway 28 was originally designated as part of Highway 18, which continued east to Estevan and ended at Highway 13. The section north of Lake Alma became Highway 28 when Highway 18 was extended west to Minton in the 1960s.

== Major intersections ==
From south to north:

Rural municipality	Location	km	mi	Destinations	Notes
Lake Alma No. 8	Lake Alma	0.0	0.0	Highway 18 – Estevan, Gladmar, Minton	Southern terminus
Laurier No. 38		33.7	20.9	Highway 705	
Laurier No. 38	Radville	39.7	24.7	Highway 377 west (Railway Avenue) – Ceylon, Radville-Laurier Regional Park	Eastern terminus of Hwy 377
Brokenshell No. 68		59.8	37.2	Highway 13 – Assiniboia, Weyburn	West of Trossachs; northern terminus
1.000 mi = 1.609 km; 1.000 km = 0.621 mi

== See also ==
- Transportation in Saskatchewan
- Roads in Saskatchewan
