= Weyburn (disambiguation) =

Weyburn is a city in south-east Saskatchewan, Canada.

Weyburn may also refer to:

- Rural Municipality of Weyburn No. 67 is a rural municipality in Saskatchewan.
- North Weyburn is a community in south-east Saskatchewan.
- Weyburn Airport is an airport in south-east Saskatchewan.
- Weyburn-Big Muddy is a provincial electoral district.
- Weyburn (provincial electoral district) was a former provincial electoral district.
- Weyburn (federal electoral district) was a federal electoral district in Saskatchewan.

== See also ==
- Weyburn Regiment was an infantry regiment of the Non-Permanent Active Militia of the Canadian Militia.
- Weyburn-Midale Carbon Dioxide Project is a carbon capture and storage project.
- Weyburn Security Bank was a chartered bank headquartered in Weyburn, Saskatchewan.
- Weyburn Red Wings, a Canadian junior ice hockey team.
