= Gladmar =

Dissolved village in Saskatchewan, Canada

- Dissolved village
- Motto: "Where everyone's your neighbour"
- Location of Gladmar in Saskatchewan Gladmar (Canada)
- Coordinates: 49.164°N 104.455°W
- Country: Canada
- Province: Saskatchewan
- Census division: Division No.2
- Rural Municipality: Surprise Valley No. 9
- Established: N/A

Area
  - Total: 0.55 km^{2} (0.21 sq mi)
- Elevation: 698 m (2,290 ft)

Population (2021)
  - Total: 41
- Time zone: UTC−06:00 (CST)
- Postal code: S0C 1A0
- Area code: 306
- Highways: Highway 18

Gladmar is a dissolved village in the Canadian province of Saskatchewan about 2 kilometres (1.2 mi) north of Highway 18 as it runs east from Highway 6 towards Lake Alma. Gladmar is 18.4 kilometres (11.4 mi) north of the Canada–United States border. It is part of the Rural Municipality of Surprise Valley No. 9 and Census Division No. 2.

The area around Gladmar was settled around the turn of the 20th century, a period when a large number of Norwegians migrated into Saskatchewan from older settlements in the northern United States. As a result, Norwegian-Canadians still represent a substantial proportion of the population in the area today.

== History ==
The original village of Gladmar was founded a few miles north of its present location in 1909.

Among the early settlers was J.E. Black who named the settlement "Gladmar" after his son Gladstone and his daughter Margaret.

In 1910 the Eidness Brothers obtained a coal lease on land in the Gladmar area from the government, with an annual rent of $1.00 per acre. The first coal from Gladmar Mine was brought out in 1910, on a stone-boat pulled by oxen. The price of coal was $1.75 per ton. The mine was later sold to the Culbert Family and then to Ole Ekimo and Lorentz Petterson.

In 1911 Mrs. J.E. Black was established as the settlement's first postmaster. The first mail was brought to Gladmar by Lars Lunde on skis from a small school halfway to Radville.

In 1912 the first General Store was built by the Eidness brothers and the first church service was conducted by Mr. Hoffman in a new 14' by 18' (4.2 x 5.5 m) building in August 1912.

The settlement began organizing a rural municipality and school district in 1912. This resulted in the RM of Surprise Valley No. 9 being created with Tom Warren as Reeve, J.E Black as councillor and Tom Black as secretary.

In 1913 Violet Hammond was the first teacher of Gladmar's first School. It was located a few miles out of town and served Gladmar and the surrounding area. This one-room school's official name was Ryeburn Valley and it was established within School District #4264.

The first recorded burial in the community-operated Gladmar Cemetery was in 1916.

In 1922 the Gladmar Hall was built and it was then regularly used for community gatherings.

The Canadian Pacific Railway reached Lake Alma in 1926 and Minton in 1929. Olaf Eidness loaded the first car of wheat in Gladmar. Grain elevators were built in Gladmar by Pool in 1929, and by Parish & Heimbecker in 1930.

In 1944 a hospital was constructed to serve Gladmar, the RM of Surprise Valley No. 9, and Lake Alma.

In 1948 a new school was built within the town limits and the first teachers were Mrs. J. Ferguson and Mrs. John Onstad.

Historical data are from "History of Gladmar", which was compiled by the Gladmar Community Club in 1955. This was later republished within the book "Homesteading in Surprise Valley" also by the Gladmar Community Club in 1970.

== Utilities ==
Electricity is provided to Gladmar by SaskPower from the Boundary Dam Coal-Fired Power plant, and natural gas is provided by SaskEnergy. the village has two wells and a water pumping station with water treatment to distribute water to the community. Sewage is held by septic tanks on individual properties, and pumped out with a sewer pump into the nearby dugout.

There is landline telephone service provided by SaskTel, and a SaskTel mobile data booster tower in town. But wireless home internet is only available by satellite providers.

== Geology ==
The area surrounding Gladmar consists of rolling hills and valleys which flatten out into salt lakes to the southeast. The salt lakes are part of the Coteau Lakes (SK017) Important Bird Area of Canada. Gladmar is situated in the southern tip of Canada's grain belt, and due to a generally dry climate, soil erosion from strong gusting winds and rivers has long been a concern in the region. The area's natural resources include deposits of sodium sulphate and potassium sulphate, scattered oil pools, coal fields, and potash and salt resources.

== Flora and fauna ==
The plant life surrounding Gladmar consists of shortgrass prairie species. These species grow in the driest parts of North America's grasslands and usually consist of a single plant layer made up mostly of shallow-rooted bunch grasses that grow between 12 and 18 inches (30 and 46 cm) high.

Some plant species indigenous to the area include western wheatgrass (Pascopyrum smithii), snowberry (Symphoricarpos), and silver sage.

Animal species that can be found in the area include: golden eagle, pronghorn, prairie rattlesnake (Crotalus viridis), sage grouse (Centrocercus), prairie falcons, bobcats, and porcupines.

== Attractions ==
Gladmar has a small kids play park, community run grocery store, a shale covered baseball diamond, a local auto repair mechanic and the Gladmar regional school. Also the town has a municipal run campground called clear lake just 10 minutes south of Gladmar which has a lake that is boat accessible, a kids play park, and has powered campsites available to book.

Gladmar Regional School is gladmar and the surrounding area's public school from preschool to grade 12. Notable alumnus Andrew Walker (Sportscaster) used to host The Andrew Walker show at the school on Sportsnet 590 The Fan, broadcast out of Toronto weekdays between 1 and 4 PM Eastern time.

== Demographics ==
In the 2021 Census of Population conducted by Statistics Canada, Gladmar had a population of 37 living in 18 of its 27 total private dwellings, a change of −35.1% from its 2016 population of 57. With a land area of 0.49 km^{2} (0.19 sq mi), it had a population density of 75.5/km^{2} (195.6/sq mi) in 2021.

Canada census – Gladmar community profile

	2016
Population	57 ({{{2016_pop_delta}}}% from 2011)
Land area	0.55 km^{2} (0.21 sq mi)
Population density	104.5/km^{2} (271/sq mi)
Median age	41.6 (M: 40, F: 42.5)
Private dwellings	27 (total)
Median household income

References: 2016

== Military history ==
Citizens of Gladmar answered the call and served for their country in each of the World Wars.

The names of those who served are listed below.

World War I:
- David Fettes
- William Speerin
- Gordon Ball
- William Sanderson
- Alby Barnes
- Sid Watland
- Bert Eidness
- Raymond VanDerkerhave
- J. Delpaere (made the supreme sacrifice)
World War II:
- Yvonne Vigoureux
- Vivian Fettes
- Arthur Ehrhardt
- Gerald Muxlow
- Tom Waldron
- Melvin Nelson

== Education ==
Gladmar Regional School which operates within the South East Cornerstone Public School Division # 209 is located in Gladmar. The school teaches students from Preschool to Grade 12 and enrollment as of September 30, 2019 was 97 students.

== Employment ==
=== Farming and ranching ===
The majority of work within Gladmar and the surrounding area takes place on family-owned farms and ranches.

Major crops in the area include barley, canola, durum, flax seed, oats, spring wheat, and winter wheat, with the most seeded acres dedicated to durum and spring wheat.

Local ranches raise various breeds of beef cattle.

=== Industry ===
In the town's early beginnings many of its citizens were employed by the town's coal mine.

After the coal mine was closed many people were employed at the sodium sulphate plant outside of town. It was eventually purchased by Saskatchewan Minerals in 1981 only to be closed in 1984 in response to a shift in market conditions.

At present, there is an oilfield owned and operated by Northrock Resources Ltd. to the southeast of Gladmar and a Class II Industrial Oilfield Waste Disposal Facility operated by GAP Disposal Ltd. to the South.

Some five trucking companies operate out of the Gladmar area servicing the surrounding region's agriculture and oil sectors.

== See also ==
- List of communities in Saskatchewan
- List of villages in Saskatchewan
