= RCAF Station Weyburn =

Former military installation in Saskatchewan, Canada

- RM of Weyburn No. 67, Saskatchewan; Near Weyburn, Saskatchewan in Canada

Site information
- Operator: Formerly Royal Canadian Air Force

Location
- Location within Saskatchewan
- Coordinates: 49°42′N 103°48′W

Airfield information
- Identifiers: IATA: none, ICAO: none
- Elevation: 1,919 ft (585 m) AMSL
Runways
Direction	Length and surface
12/30	2,900 ft (880 m) Hard Surfaced
12/30	3,300 ft (1,000 m) Hard Surfaced
6/24	3,000 ft (910 m) Hard Surfaced
6/24	3,400 ft (1,000 m) Hard Surfaced
17/35	2,900 ft (880 m) Hard Surfaced
17/35	3,300 ft (1,000 m) Hard Surfaced

RCAF Station Weyburn was located 2.2 nautical miles (4.1 km; 2.5 mi) north-east of Weyburn, Saskatchewan, Canada at the hamlet of North Weyburn and was constructed in 1941 by the Royal Canadian Air Force (RCAF) as part of the British Commonwealth Air Training Plan. The Station was home to No. 41 Service Flying Training School and during its operation graduated 1,055 pilots and recorded more than 180,000 hours of flight time before being abandoned on 30 June 1944.

== Aerodrome information ==
In approximately 1942 the aerodrome was listed as RCAF Aerodrome - Weyburn, Saskatchewan at 49°42′N 103°48′W with a variation of 17 degrees east and elevation of 1,919 ft (585 m). Six runways were listed as follows:

Runway Name	Length	Width	Surface
12/30	2,900 ft (880 m)	100 ft (30 m)	Hard Surface
12/30	3,300 ft (1,000 m)	100 ft (30 m)	Hard Surface
6/24	3,000 ft (910 m)	100 ft (30 m)	Hard Surface
6/24	3,400 ft (1,000 m)	100 ft (30 m)	Hard Surface
17/35	2,900 ft (880 m)	100 ft (30 m)	Hard Surface
17/35	3,300 ft (1,000 m)	100 ft (30 m)	Hard Surface

== Relief landing field – Halbrite ==
A Relief Landing field for RCAF Station Weyburn was located approximately 19 mi (31 km) south-east. The site was located south of the village of Halbrite. In approximately 1942 the aerodrome was listed as RCAF Aerodrome - Halbrite, Saskatchewan at 49°28′N 103°34′W with a variation of 16 degrees east and an elevation of 1,900 ft (580 m). The Relief field was laid out in a triangle with three runways, detailed in the following table:

Runway Name	Length	Width	Surface
5/23	2,700 ft (820 m)	150 ft (46 m)	Hard Surface
17/35	2,700 ft (820 m)	150 ft (46 m)	Hard Surface
11/29	2,700 ft (820 m)	150 ft (46 m)	Hard Surface

A review of Google Maps satellite imagery on 8 June 2018 shows no details indicating an airfield at the listed coordinates.

== Relief landing field – Ralph ==
A Relief Landing field for RCAF Station Weyburn was located approximately 12 mi (19 km) south-east of Weyburn and approximately 2 mi (3.2 km) south of the unincorporated community of Ralph south of Highway 39. In approximately 1942 the aerodrome was listed as RCAF Aerodrome - Ralph, Saskatchewan at 49°33′N 103°41′W with a variation of 16 degrees east and an elevation of 1,880 ft (570 m). The Relief field was detailed as "Turf - All way field - Servicable" and was drawn as a triangular layout with no dimensional information. A review of Google Maps satellite imagery on 8 June 2018 shows no details indicating an airfield at the listed coordinates.

== See also ==
- List of airports in Saskatchewan
- Weyburn Airport
