= Radville station =

Railway station in Saskatchewan, Canada

Radville
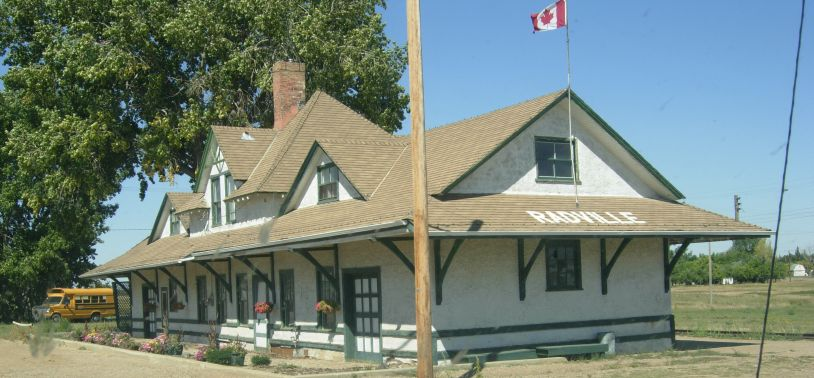

General information
- Location: Railway Avenue; Radville, Saskatchewan
- Coordinates: 49.461703°N 104.295083°W
- Lines: Canadian Northern Railway (former); Canadian National Railway

History
- Opened: 1912

Former services
Preceding station	Canadian National Railway	Following station
Terminus	Radville – Maryfield	Souris Valley toward Maryfield
Dandonneau toward Weyburn	Weyburn – Radville	Terminus
Location

Radville station is a former railway station in Radville, Saskatchewan. It was built by the Canadian Northern Railway as part of the Brandon to Lethbridge line, which was completed only as far west as Willow Bunch. The two-storey, wood-frame railway station is at a major division point on the railway line and is the only remaining 2nd-Class CNR railway station building still standing in the province. The building was designed by architect Ralph Benjamin Pratt. As a major division point from 1911 until the 1950s the site also housed a railway roundhouse. The building was designated a municipal heritage property in 1984. The building is now used as a museum and community event building.
