= Rural Municipality of Brokenshell No. 68 =

Rural municipality in Saskatchewan, Canada

Brokenshell No. 68
- Rural municipality
- Rural Municipality of Brokenshell No. 68
- Location of the RM of Brokenshell No. 68 in Saskatchewan
- Coordinates: 49.654°N 104.242°W
- Country: Canada
- Province: Saskatchewan
- Census division: 2
- SARM division: 2
- Federal riding: Souris—Moose Mountain
- Provincial riding: Weyburn-Big Muddy
- Formed: December 13, 1909

Government
  - Reeve: Jay Holyer-Riviere
  - Governing body: RM of Brokenshell No. 68 Council
  - Administrator: Jenna Smolinski
  - Office location: Weyburn

Area (2016)
  - Land: 850.01 km^{2} (328.19 sq mi)

Population (2016)
  - Total: 312
  - Density: 0.4/km^{2} (1.0/sq mi)
- Time zone: CST
  - Summer (DST): CST
- Postal code: S4H 3E7
- Area codes: 306 and 639
- Website: Official website

The Rural Municipality of Brokenshell No. 68 (2016 population: 312) is a rural municipality (RM) in the Canadian province of Saskatchewan within Census Division No. 2 and SARM Division No. 2. It is located in the southeast portion of the province.

== History ==
The RM of Brokenshell No. 68 incorporated as a rural municipality on December 13, 1909.

== Geography ==
=== Communities and localities ===
The following unincorporated communities are located within the RM.

Organized hamlets

- Trossachs

Localities

- Abbott
- Axford
- Brightmore
- Clearfield
- Yeoman

== Demographics ==
Population history (1981–2016)
Year	Pop.	±%
1981	427	—
1986	393	−8.0%
1991	348	−11.5%
1996	340	−2.3%
2001	317	−6.8%
2006	324	+2.2%
2011	308	−4.9%
2016	312	+1.3%
Source: Statistics Canada via Saskatchewan Bureau of Statistics

In the 2021 Census of Population conducted by Statistics Canada, the RM of Brokenshell No. 68 had a population of 307 living in 117 of its 127 total private dwellings, a change of −1.6% from its 2016 population of 312. With a land area of 845.97 km^{2} (326.63 sq mi), it had a population density of 0.4/km^{2} (0.9/sq mi) in 2021.

In the 2016 Census of Population, the RM of Brokenshell No. 68 recorded a population of 312 living in 115 of its 135 total private dwellings, a 1.3% change from its 2011 population of 308. With a land area of 850.01 km^{2} (328.19 sq mi), it had a population density of 0.4/km^{2} (1.0/sq mi) in 2016.

== Government ==
The RM of Brokenshell No. 68 is governed by an elected municipal council and an appointed administrator that meets on the first Thursday of every month. The reeve of the RM is Jay Holyer-Riviere while its administrator is Jenna Smolinski. The RM's office is located in Weyburn. The RM's office was located in Trossachs until 1998 when permission was received to share offices with the RM of Weyburn No. 67, though technical operations remain in Trossachs.
