= Pangman =

Village in Saskatchewan, Canada

Pangman West Calder
- Village
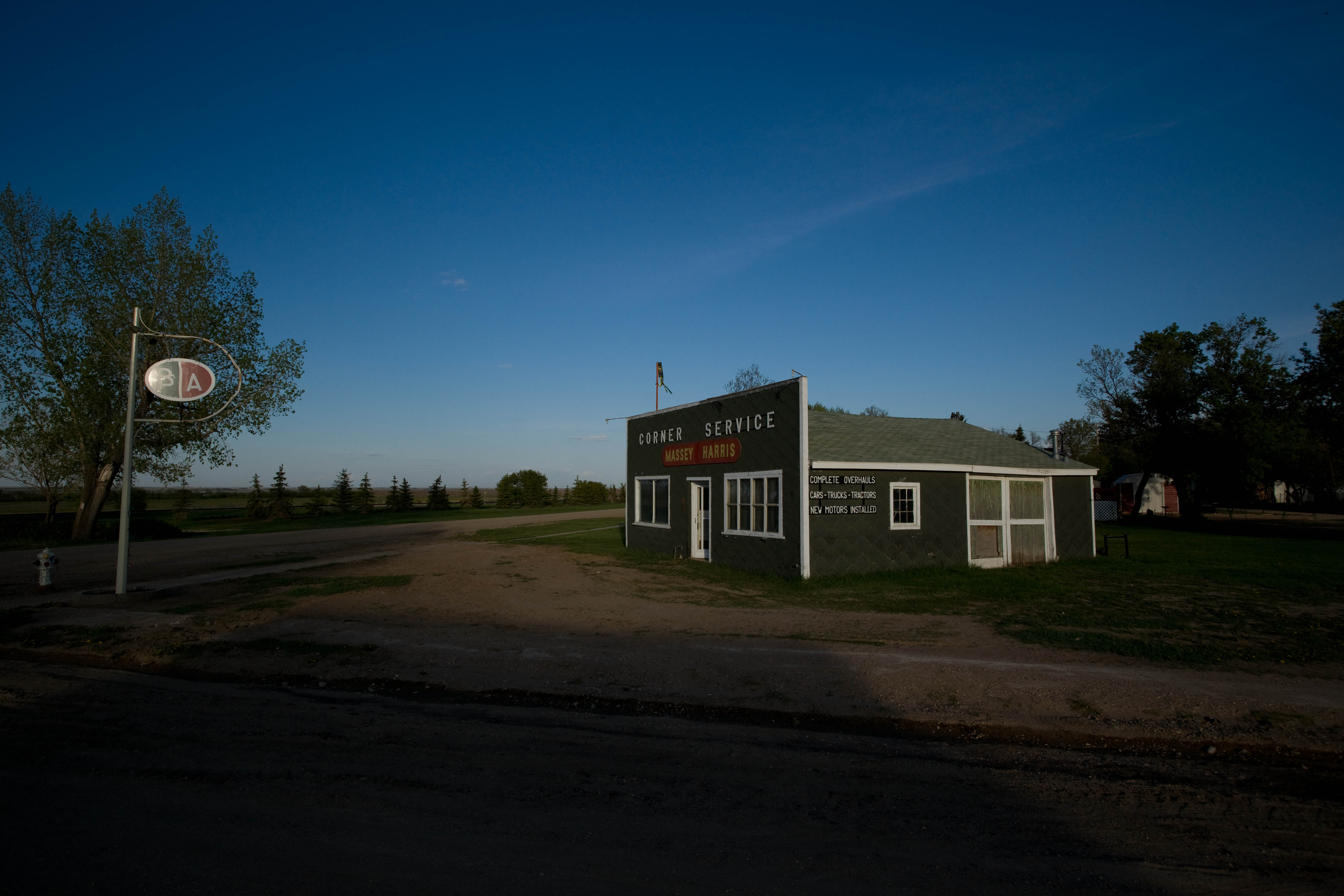
- Interactive map of Pangman
- Coordinates: 49°38′47″N 104°39′36″W
- Country: Canada
- Province: Saskatchewan

Area
  - Total: 0.73 km^{2} (0.28 sq mi)

Population (2001)
  - Total: 255
  - Density: 350/km^{2} (900/sq mi)
- Time zone: UTC-6 (CST)

Pangman (2016 population: 232) is a village in the Canadian province of Saskatchewan within the Rural Municipality of Norton No. 69 and Census Division No. 2. It was formerly known as West Calder.

== History ==
Pangman incorporated as a village on May 17, 1911. It was named after Peter Pangman, an independent fur trader.

This location had a post office of the name West Calder from 1909-04-23 through to 1910-08-01. West Calder Post Office was located at Sec.8, Twp.8, R.20, W2. Pangman is currently a village located at Sec. 16, Twp. 8, R.20, W2.

There are two local history books written about Pangman, including Pangman and Amulet's Past (edited and published by F. Sample with Author Clews, DBCN : AAU-2150), and Update 95 : R.M. of Norton #69 : Pangman, Moreland, Khedive, Forward, Amulet (published in Pangman, Sask. : R.M. of Norton History Committee, c1998)

== Demographics ==
Population history (1981–2016)
Year	Pop.	±%
1981	227	—
1986	270	+18.9%
1991	248	−8.1%
1996	251	+1.2%
2001	255	+1.6%
2006	200	−21.6%
2011	214	+7.0%
2016	232	+8.4%
Source: Statistics Canada via Saskatchewan Bureau of Statistics

In the 2021 Census of Population conducted by Statistics Canada, Pangman had a population of 238 living in 99 of its 112 total private dwellings, a change of 2.6% from its 2016 population of 232. With a land area of 0.73 km^{2} (0.28 sq mi), it had a population density of 326.0/km^{2} (844.4/sq mi) in 2021.

In the 2016 Census of Population, the Village of Pangman recorded a population of 232 living in 93 of its 116 total private dwellings, a 7.8% change from its 2011 population of 214. With a land area of 0.73 km^{2} (0.28 sq mi), it had a population density of 317.8/km^{2} (823.1/sq mi) in 2016.

== Education ==
Historically, there were three one-room school districts located in the area of Pangman. Pangman School District #98, located at Section Tsp 8, Range 20, west of the 2 Meridian, was formed in 1911. The other two districts were Wild Rose School District #1876 at Tsp 9, Rge 20, west of the 2 Meridian, and Kenneth School District #2016 neighboring at NW Sec 23, Tsp 8, Rge 20, west of the 2 Meridian.

== Transportation ==
- Highway 13
- Pangman Airport

== See also ==
- List of communities in Saskatchewan
