= Weyburn Airport =

Airport in Saskatchewan, Canada

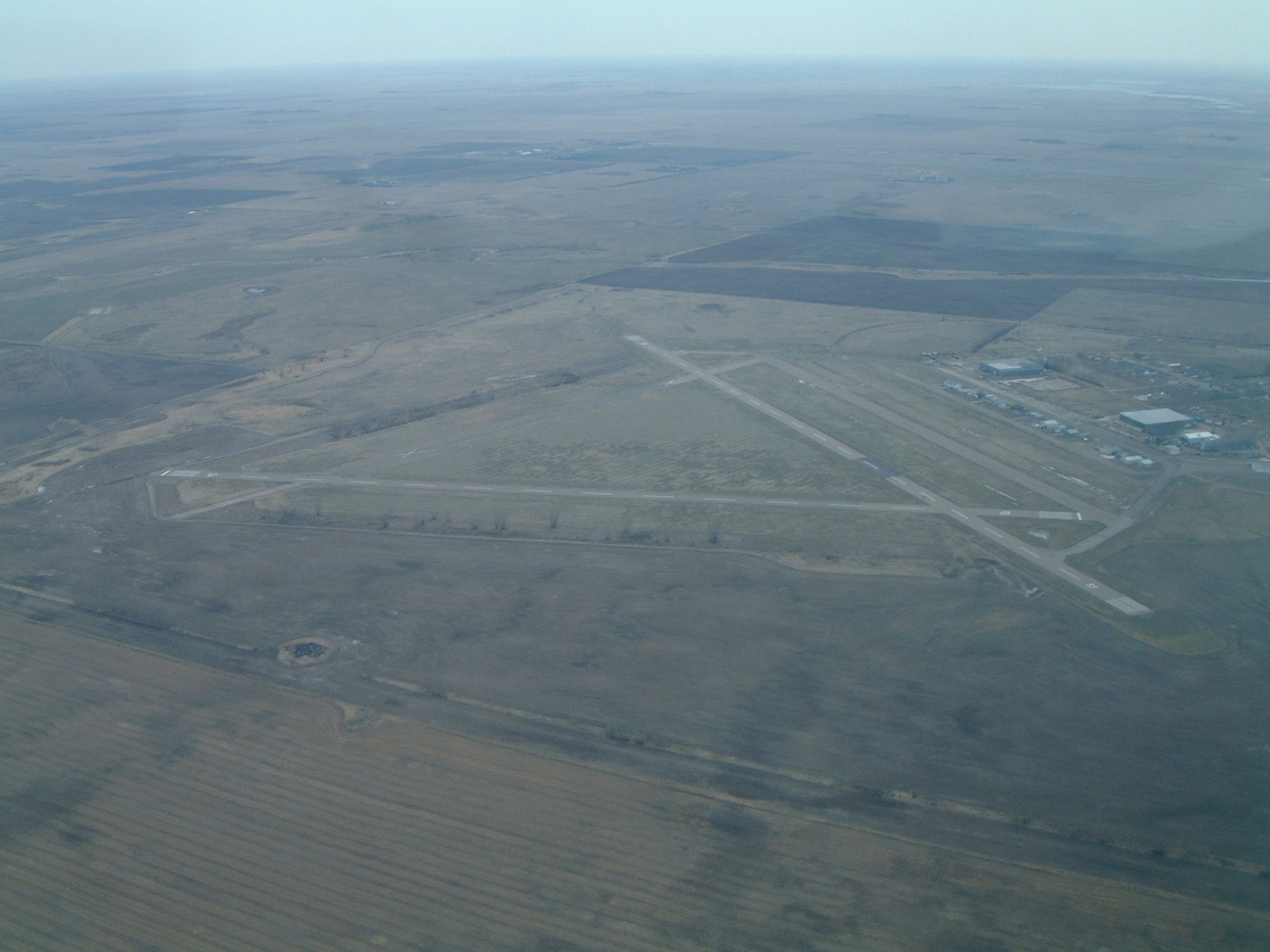
- Weyburn Airport
- IATA: none; ICAO: none; TC LID: CJE3

Summary
- Airport type: Public
- Operator: Town of Weyburn
- Location: RM of Weyburn No. 67, near Weyburn, Saskatchewan
- Time zone: CST (UTC−06:00)
- Elevation AMSL: 1,934 ft / 589 m
- Coordinates: 49°41′51″N 103°48′03″W

Map
- Location in Saskatchewan CJE3 (Canada)

Runways
Direction	Length		Surface
Direction	ft	m	Surface
06/24	3,016	919	Asphalt
12/30	3,998	1,219	Asphalt
- Source: Canada Flight Supplement

Weyburn Airport (TC LID: CJE3) is located 2.2 nautical miles (4.1 km; 2.5 mi) north-east of Weyburn, Saskatchewan, Canada at the hamlet of North Weyburn.

== History ==
The aerodrome was constructed in 1941 by the Royal Canadian Air Force (RCAF) as part of the British Commonwealth Air Training Plan. The station was home to No. 41 Service Flying Training School, and during its operation graduated 1,055 pilots and recorded more than 180,000 hours of flight time before being abandoned on 30 June 1944.

=== Post-war ===
Other uses included a children's physiological hospital in the 1950s and the home of the Western Christian College from 1957 until 1989.

== Current use ==
Some of the original hangars are still in existence.

Two runways remain in operation, while runway 18/36 is abandoned.

== See also ==
- List of airports in Saskatchewan
- RCAF Station Weyburn
