= McTaggart, Saskatchewan =

Village in Saskatchewan, Canada

Village of Mctaggart
- Village
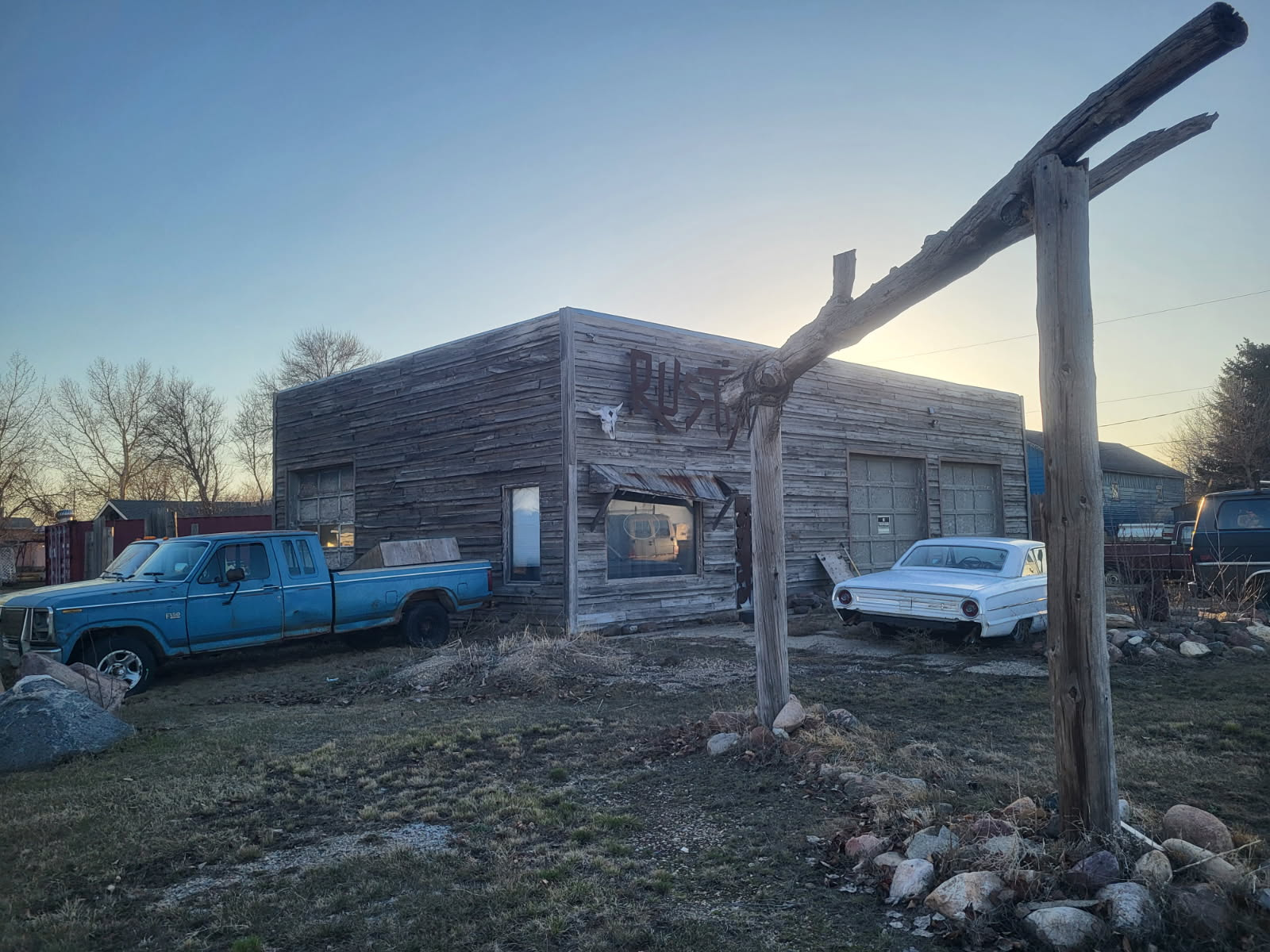
- Old building in McTaggart

- Location of McTaggart in Saskatchewan Village of Mctaggart (Canada)
- Coordinates: 49.731°N 104.006°W
- Country: Canada
- Province: Saskatchewan
- Region: Saskatchewan
- Census division: 2
- Rural Municipality: Weyburn
- Post office Founded: N/A
- Incorporated (Village): N/A
- Incorporated (Town): N/A

Government
  - Mayor: Kevin Donald
  - Administrator: Nichol Lynch
  - Governing body: Mctaggart Village Council

Area
  - Total: 0.69 km^{2} (0.27 sq mi)

Population (2006)
  - Total: 114
  - Density: 183.7/km^{2} (476/sq mi)
- Time zone: CST
- Postal code: S0G 3G0
- Area code: 306
- Highways: CanAm Highway / Highway 39

McTaggart (2016 population: 121) is a village in the Canadian province of Saskatchewan within the Rural Municipality of Weyburn No. 67 and Census Division No. 2.

== History ==
McTaggart incorporated as a village on October 5, 1909.

== Demographics ==
Population history (1981–2016)
| Year | Pop. | ±% |
|---|---|---|
| 1981 | 103 | — |
| 1986 | 128 | +24.3% |
| 1991 | 122 | −4.7% |
| 1996 | 124 | +1.6% |
| 2001 | 126 | +1.6% |
| 2006 | 114 | −9.5% |
| 2011 | 125 | +9.6% |
| 2016 | 121 | −3.2% |
Source: Statistics Canada via Saskatchewan Bureau of Statistics

In the 2021 Census of Population conducted by Statistics Canada, McTaggart had a population of 125 living in 42 of its 44 total private dwellings, a change of 3.3% from its 2016 population of 121. With a land area of 0.75 km^{2} (0.29 sq mi), it had a population density of 166.7/km^{2} (431.7/sq mi) in 2021.

In the 2016 Census of Population, the Village of McTaggart recorded a population of 121 living in 41 of its 43 total private dwellings, a −3.3% change from its 2011 population of 125. With a land area of 0.69 km^{2} (0.27 sq mi), it had a population density of 175.4/km^{2} (454.2/sq mi) in 2016.

== See also ==
- List of communities in Saskatchewan
- List of villages in Saskatchewan
