= Rural Municipality of Norton No. 69 =

Rural municipality in Saskatchewan, Canada

Norton No. 69
- Rural municipality
- Rural Municipality of Norton No. 69
- Location of the RM of Norton No. 69 in Saskatchewan
- Coordinates: 49.712°N 104.672°W
- Country: Canada
- Province: Saskatchewan
- Census division: 2
- SARM division: 2
- Federal riding: Souris—Moose Mountain
- Provincial riding: Weyburn-Big Muddy
- Formed: December 13, 1909

Government
  - Reeve: Tom Webb
  - Governing body: RM of Norton No. 69 Council
  - Administrator: Patti Gurskey
  - Office location: Pangman

Area (2016)
  - Land: 844.8 km^{2} (326.2 sq mi)

Population (2016)
  - Total: 233
  - Density: 0.3/km^{2} (0.78/sq mi)
- Time zone: CST
  - Summer (DST): CST
- Postal code: S0C 2C0
- Area codes: 306 and 639

The Rural Municipality of Norton No. 69 (2016 population: 233) is a rural municipality (RM) in the Canadian province of Saskatchewan within Census Division No. 2 and SARM Division No. 2. It is located in the southeast portion of the province.

The name origin probably comes from a town in England. The name origin of Norton means "north settlement".

== History ==
The RM of Norton No. 69 incorporated as a rural municipality on December 13, 1909.

== Geography ==
=== Communities and localities ===
The following urban municipalities are surrounded by the RM.

Villages

- Pangman, (seat of municipality)

The following unincorporated communities are within the RM.

Localities

- Amulet (dissolved as a village, January 1, 1965)
- Khedive (dissolved as a village January 1, 2002)
- Forward (dissolved as a village, December 31, 1947)
- Moreland
- Wallace

== Demographics ==
Population history (1981–2016)
Year	Pop.	±%
1981	461	—
1986	387	−16.1%
1991	346	−10.6%
1996	296	−14.5%
2001	252	−14.9%
2006	248	−1.6%
2011	259	+4.4%
2016	233	−10.0%
Source: Statistics Canada via Saskatchewan Bureau of Statistics

In the 2021 Census of Population conducted by Statistics Canada, the RM of Norton No. 69 had a population of 233 living in 97 of its 110 total private dwellings, a change of 0% from its 2016 population of 233. With a land area of 808.81 km^{2} (312.28 sq mi), it had a population density of 0.3/km^{2} (0.7/sq mi) in 2021.

In the 2016 Census of Population, the RM of Norton No. 69 recorded a population of 233 living in 102 of its 122 total private dwellings, a −10% change from its 2011 population of 259. With a land area of 844.8 km^{2} (326.2 sq mi), it had a population density of 0.3/km^{2} (0.7/sq mi) in 2016.

== Government ==
The RM of Norton No. 69 is governed by an elected municipal council and an appointed administrator that meets on the second Wednesday of every month. The reeve of the RM is Tom Webb while its administrator is Patti Gurskey. The RM's office is located in Pangman.
