= Trossachs, Saskatchewan =

Hamlet in Saskatchewan, Canada

Hamlet of Trossachs
- Hamlet
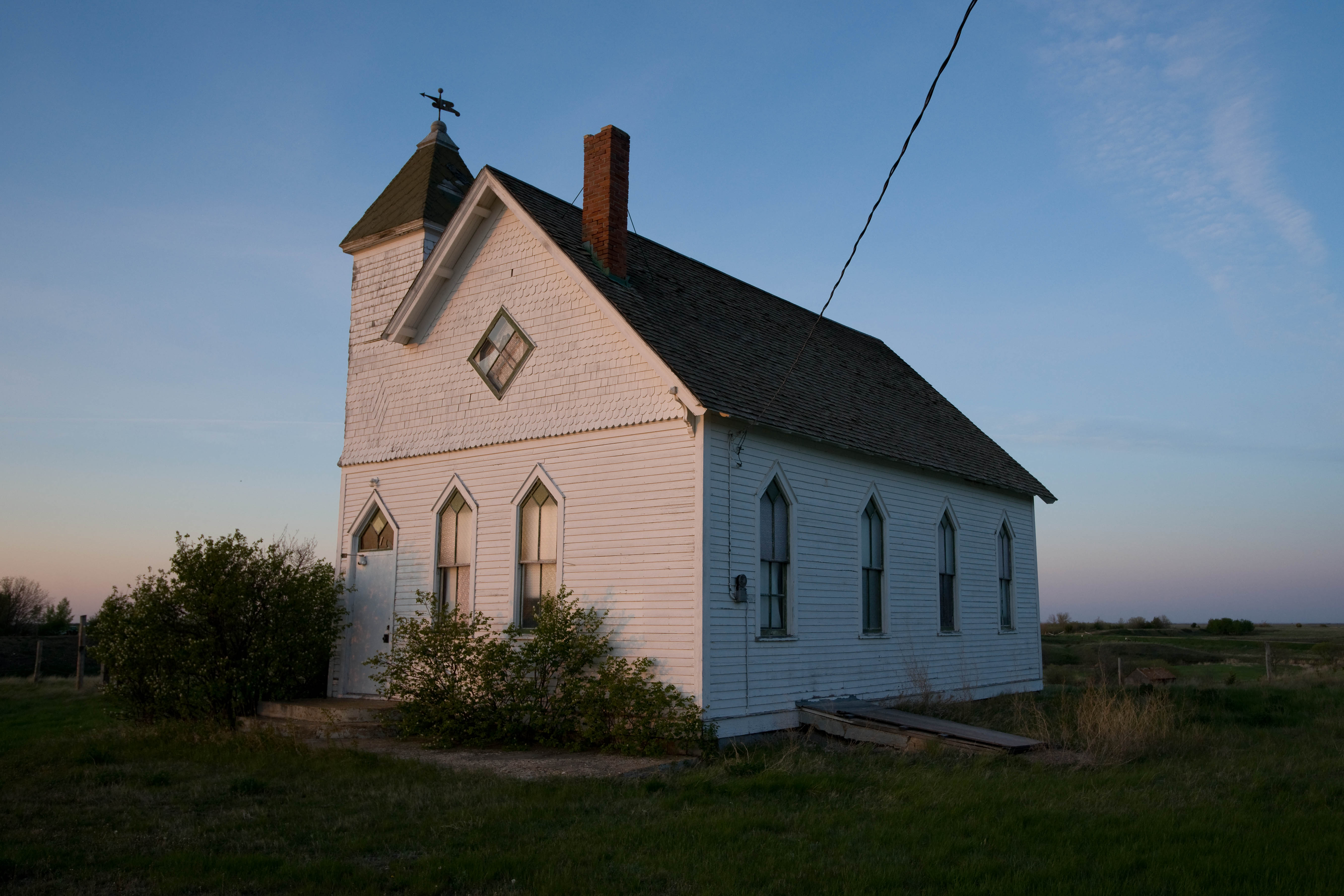
- Church in Trossachs

- Location within Saskatchewan Location within Canada
- Coordinates: 49°38′19″N 104°13′38″W
- Country: Canada
- Province: Saskatchewan
- Census division: 2
- Rural Municipality: Brokenshell No. 68

Area
  - Total: 0.36 km^{2} (0.14 sq mi)

Population (2021)
  - Total: 50
  - Density: 138.9/km^{2} (360/sq mi)
- Time zone: CST
- Postal code: S0C 2N0
- Area code: 306
- Highways: Highway 13 (Red Coat Trail / Ghost Town Trail)

Trossachs is a hamlet in the Canadian province of Saskatchewan. Located in the southern part of the province within the Rural Municipality of Brokenshell No. 68, it lies along Highway 13 (the historic Red Coat Trail / Ghost Town Trail) near its intersections with both Highway 28 and Highway 621.

== Demographics ==
In the 2021 Census of Population conducted by Statistics Canada, Trossachs had a population of 50 living in 14 of its 15 total private dwellings, a change of 19% from its 2016 population of 42. With a land area of 0.36 km^{2} (0.14 sq mi), it had a population density of 138.9/km^{2} (359.7/sq mi) in 2021.

== See also ==
- List of hamlets in Saskatchewan
