= Rural Municipality of The Gap No. 39 =

Rural municipality in Saskatchewan, Canada

The Gap No. 39
- Rural municipality
- Rural Municipality of The Gap No. 39
- Location of the RM of The Gap No. 39 in Saskatchewan
- Coordinates: 49.425°N 104.628°W
- Country: Canada
- Province: Saskatchewan
- Census division: 2
- SARM division: 2
- Federal riding: Souris—Moose Mountain
- Provincial riding: Weyburn-Big Muddy
- Formed: December 12, 1903

Government
  - Reeve: Alastair Burnett
  - Governing body: RM of The Gap No. 39 Council
  - Administrator: Leah Ward
  - Office location: Ceylon

Area (2016)
  - Land: 830.92 km^{2} (320.82 sq mi)

Population (2016)
  - Total: 199
  - Density: 0.2/km^{2} (0.52/sq mi)
- Time zone: CST
  - Summer (DST): CST
- Postal code: S0C 0T0
- Area codes: 306 and 639

The Rural Municipality of The Gap No. 39 (2016 population: 199) is a rural municipality (RM) in the Canadian province of Saskatchewan within Census Division No. 2 and SARM Division No. 2.

== History ==
The RM of The Gap No. 39 incorporated as a rural municipality on December 12, 1903.

== Geography ==
=== Communities and localities ===
The following urban municipalities are surrounded by the RM.

Villages

- Ceylon

The following unincorporated communities are within the RM.

Localities

- Hardy, dissolved as a village, January 1, 2000

== Demographics ==
Population history (1981–2016)
Year	Pop.	±%
1981	422	—
1986	389	−7.8%
1991	320	−17.7%
1996	278	−13.1%
2001	280	+0.7%
2006	245	−12.5%
2011	230	−6.1%
2016	199	−13.5%
Source: Statistics Canada via Saskatchewan Bureau of Statistics

In the 2021 Census of Population conducted by Statistics Canada, the RM of The Gap No. 39 had a population of 181 living in 77 of its 95 total private dwellings, a change of −9% from its 2016 population of 199. With a land area of 795.76 km^{2} (307.24 sq mi), it had a population density of 0.2/km^{2} (0.6/sq mi) in 2021.

In the 2016 Census of Population, the RM of The Gap No. 39 recorded a population of 199 living in 79 of its 97 total private dwellings, a −13.5% change from its 2011 population of 230. With a land area of 830.92 km^{2} (320.82 sq mi), it had a population density of 0.2/km^{2} (0.6/sq mi) in 2016.

== Government ==
The RM of The Gap No. 39 is governed by an elected municipal council and an appointed administrator that meets on the second Wednesday of every month. The reeve of the RM is Alastair Burnett while its administrator is Leah Ward. The RM's office is located in Ceylon.

== See also ==
- List of rural municipalities in Saskatchewan
