= Rural Municipality of Lake Alma No. 8 =

Rural municipality in Saskatchewan, Canada

Lake Alma No. 8
- Rural municipality
- Rural Municipality of Lake Alma No. 8
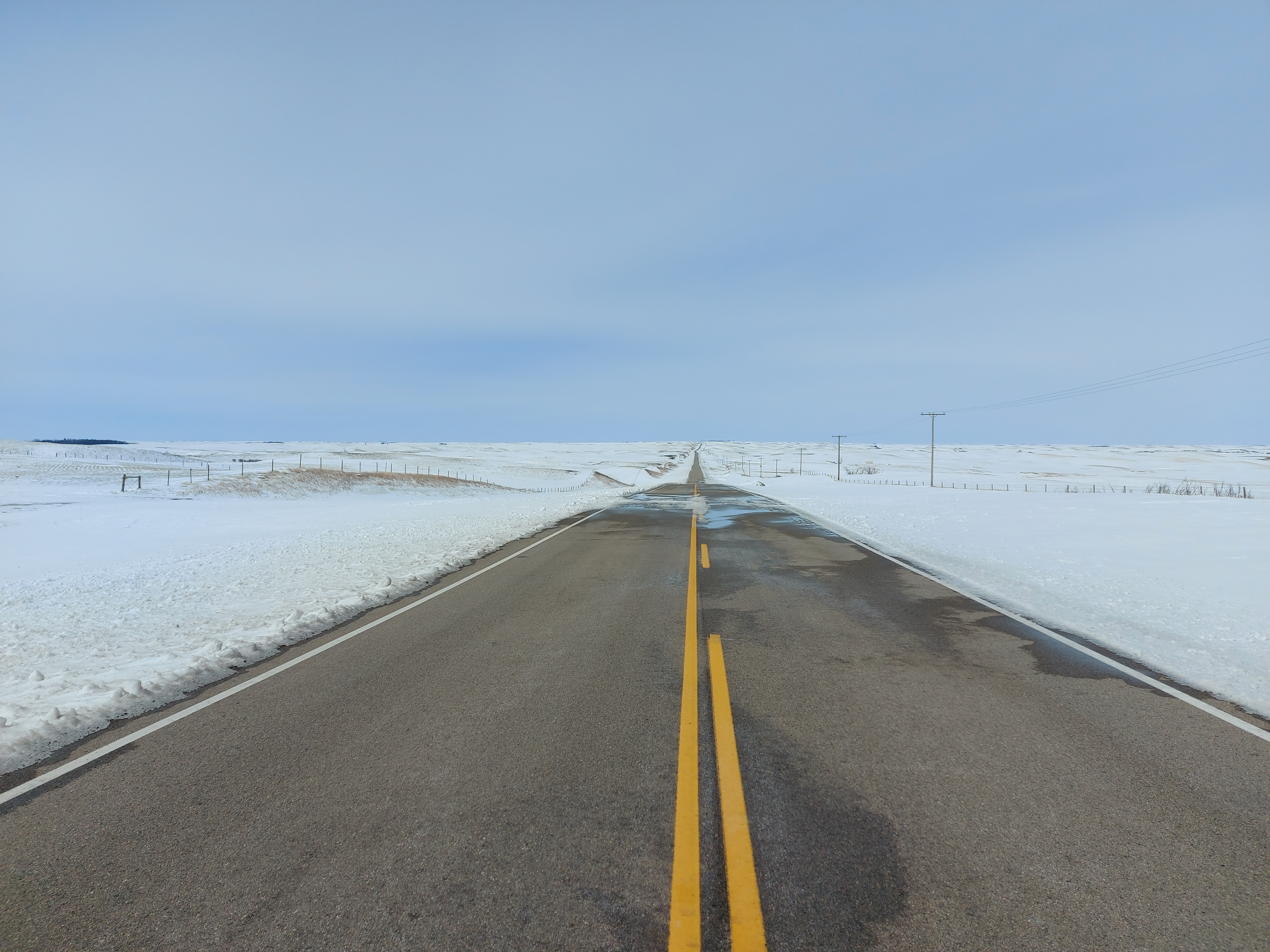
- Highway 18 through the RM of Lake Alma

- Location of the RM of Lake Alma No. 8 in Saskatchewan
- Coordinates: 49.126°N 104.194°W
- Country: Canada
- Province: Saskatchewan
- Census division: 2
- SARM division: 2
- Federal riding: Souris—Moose Mountain
- Provincial riding: Weyburn-Big Muddy
- Formed: May 5, 1913

Government
  - Reeve: Rodney Robinson
  - Governing body: RM of Lake Alma No. 8 Council
  - Administrator: Myrna Lohse
  - Office location: Lake Alma

Area (2016)
  - Land: 822.47 km^{2} (317.56 sq mi)

Population (2016)
  - Total: 242
  - Density: 0.3/km^{2} (0.78/sq mi)
- Time zone: CST
  - Summer (DST): CST
- Postal code: S0C 1M0
- Area codes: 306 and 639

The Rural Municipality of Lake Alma No. 8 (2016 population: 242) is a rural municipality (RM) in the Canadian province of Saskatchewan within Census Division No. 2 and SARM Division No. 2. Located in the southeast portion of the province, it is adjacent to the United States border, neighbouring Sheridan County in Montana and Divide County in North Dakota.

== History ==
The RM of Lake Alma No. 8 incorporated as a rural municipality on May 5, 1913.

== Geography ==
=== Communities and localities ===
The following urban municipalities are surrounded by the RM.

Villages

- Lake Alma

The following unincorporated communities are within the RM.

Organized hamlets

- Beaubier

Localities

- Blooming

== Sandoff Lake IBA ==
Sandoff Lake SK 015 (49.0879°N 104.1563°W) is an Important Bird Area (IBA) of Canada located in the RM of Lake Alma, about 7 kilometres (4.3 mi) south of the village of Lake Alma. The IBA site encompasses Sandoff Lake and the surrounding shoreline totalling 10.24 km^{2} (3.95 sq mi). Sandoff Lake is an endorheic, salt lake with an irregularly shaped shoreline with multiple small islands. The lake has a significant population of piping plovers and, as such, the eastern two-thirds of the north shore is designated as a critical piping plover habitat. This designation protects the lake from development below the high water mark.

== Demographics ==
Population history (1981–2016)
Year	Pop.	±%
1981	423	—
1986	407	−3.8%
1991	345	−15.2%
1996	335	−2.9%
2001	289	−13.7%
2006	240	−17.0%
2011	250	+4.2%
2016	242	−3.2%
Source: Statistics Canada via Saskatchewan Bureau of Statistics

In the 2021 Census of Population conducted by Statistics Canada, the RM of Lake Alma No. 8 had a population of 269 living in 114 of its 142 total private dwellings, a change of −1.1% from its 2016 population of 272. With a land area of 785.5 km^{2} (303.3 sq mi), it had a population density of 0.3/km^{2} (0.9/sq mi) in 2021.

In the 2016 Census of Population, the RM of Lake Alma No. 8 recorded a population of 242 living in 99 of its 112 total private dwellings, a −3.2% change from its 2011 population of 250. With a land area of 822.47 km^{2} (317.56 sq mi), it had a population density of 0.3/km^{2} (0.8/sq mi) in 2016.

== Government ==
The RM of Lake Alma No. 8 is governed by an elected municipal council and an appointed administrator that meets on the second Thursday of every month. The reeve of the RM is Rodney Robinson while its administrator is Myrna Lohse. The RM's office is located in Lake Alma.

== See also ==
- List of rural municipalities in Saskatchewan
