= Ceylon, Saskatchewan =

Village in Saskatchewan, Canada

Ceylon
- Village
- Village of Ceylon
- Location within Saskatchewan Location within Canada
- Coordinates: 49.272418°N 104.362268°W
- Country: Canada
- Province: Saskatchewan
- Census division: 2
- Rural municipality: The Gap No. 39

Government
  - Type: Municipal
  - Governing body: Ceylon Village Council
  - Mayor: Landon Lillihgard
  - Administrator: Laura delaney

Area
  - Total: 0.75 km^{2} (0.29 sq mi)

Population (2016)
  - Total: 111
  - Density: 148.5/km^{2} (385/sq mi)
- Time zone: UTC-6 (CST)
- Postal code: S0C 0T0
- Area code: 306
- Highways: Highway 6 Highway 377
- Railways: Defunct (pulled)

Ceylon /siːˈlɑːn/ (2016 population: 111) is a village in the Canadian province of Saskatchewan within the Rural Municipality of The Gap No. 39 and Census Division No. 2. It is located alongside Gibson Creek, which is a tributary of Long Creek. No shops or businesses other than the bar remain.

== History ==
Ceylon incorporated as a village on September 26, 1911.

== Ceylon Regional Park ==
Ceylon Regional Park (49.4834°N 104.3172°W) is a regional park 3 kilometres (1.9 mi) east of Ceylon at the small reservoir and dam along the course of Gibson Creek. The 20-acre park has a campground, ball diamonds, fishing dock, boat launch, and swimming pool. Access to the park is from Highway 377.

The dam along the river was originally built in 1934 and rebuilt in 1984. Prior to the park being designated a regional park in 1965, it was known as Ceylon Beach in the 1950s. The campground has 34 sites, showers, washrooms, and potable water. The reservoir is stocked with jackfish and perch.

== Demographics ==
Population history (1981–2016)
Year	Pop.	±%
1981	184	—
1986	184	+0.0%
1991	163	−11.4%
1996	148	−9.2%
2001	105	−29.1%
2006	90	−14.3%
2011	99	+10.0%
2016	111	+12.1%
Source: Statistics Canada via Saskatchewan Bureau of Statistics

In the 2021 Census of Population conducted by Statistics Canada, Ceylon had a population of 97 living in 50 of its 57 total private dwellings, a change of −12.6% from its 2016 population of 111. With a land area of 0.76 km^{2} (0.29 sq mi), it had a population density of 127.6/km^{2} (330.6/sq mi) in 2021.

In the 2016 Census of Population, the Village of Ceylon recorded a population of 111 living in 53 of its 53 total private dwellings, a 10.8% change from its 2011 population of 99. With a land area of 0.75 km^{2} (0.29 sq mi), it had a population density of 148.0/km^{2} (383.3/sq mi) in 2016.

== Climate ==
Climate data for Ceylon
Month	Jan	Feb	Mar	Apr	May	Jun	Jul	Aug	Sep	Oct	Nov	Dec	Year
Record high °C (°F)	11 (52)	16 (61)	21 (70)	32 (90)	37 (99)	40 (104)	38.5 (101.3)	40 (104)	36 (97)	32.5 (90.5)	23 (73)	11.5 (52.7)	40 (104)
Mean daily maximum °C (°F)	−7.6 (18.3)	−5.6 (21.9)	1.4 (34.5)	11.1 (52.0)	18 (64)	22.6 (72.7)	25.2 (77.4)	25.2 (77.4)	18.4 (65.1)	11 (52)	0 (32)	−6.9 (19.6)	9.4 (48.9)
Daily mean °C (°F)	−12.5 (9.5)	−10.4 (13.3)	−3.5 (25.7)	4.7 (40.5)	11.3 (52.3)	16 (61)	18.6 (65.5)	18.2 (64.8)	11.8 (53.2)	5 (41)	−4.6 (23.7)	−11.8 (10.8)	3.6 (38.5)
Mean daily minimum °C (°F)	−17.4 (0.7)	−15.2 (4.6)	−8.3 (17.1)	−1.7 (28.9)	4.6 (40.3)	9.4 (48.9)	11.8 (53.2)	11.1 (52.0)	5.2 (41.4)	−1 (30)	−9.2 (15.4)	−16.5 (2.3)	−2.3 (27.9)
Record low °C (°F)	−38.5 (−37.3)	−41 (−42)	−32 (−26)	−22 (−8)	−7 (19)	−1 (30)	3 (37)	−1.5 (29.3)	−9.5 (14.9)	−19 (−2)	−32.5 (−26.5)	−41 (−42)	−41 (−42)
Average precipitation mm (inches)	16 (0.6)	10.9 (0.43)	21.1 (0.83)	23 (0.9)	49.4 (1.94)	65.8 (2.59)	70.5 (2.78)	39.6 (1.56)	37.1 (1.46)	22.1 (0.87)	14.1 (0.56)	16.7 (0.66)	386.3 (15.21)
Source: Environment Canada

== See also ==
- List of communities in Saskatchewan
- List of villages in Saskatchewan
