= Brooking, Saskatchewan =

Community in Saskatchewan, Canada

Hamlet of Brooking
- Hamlet
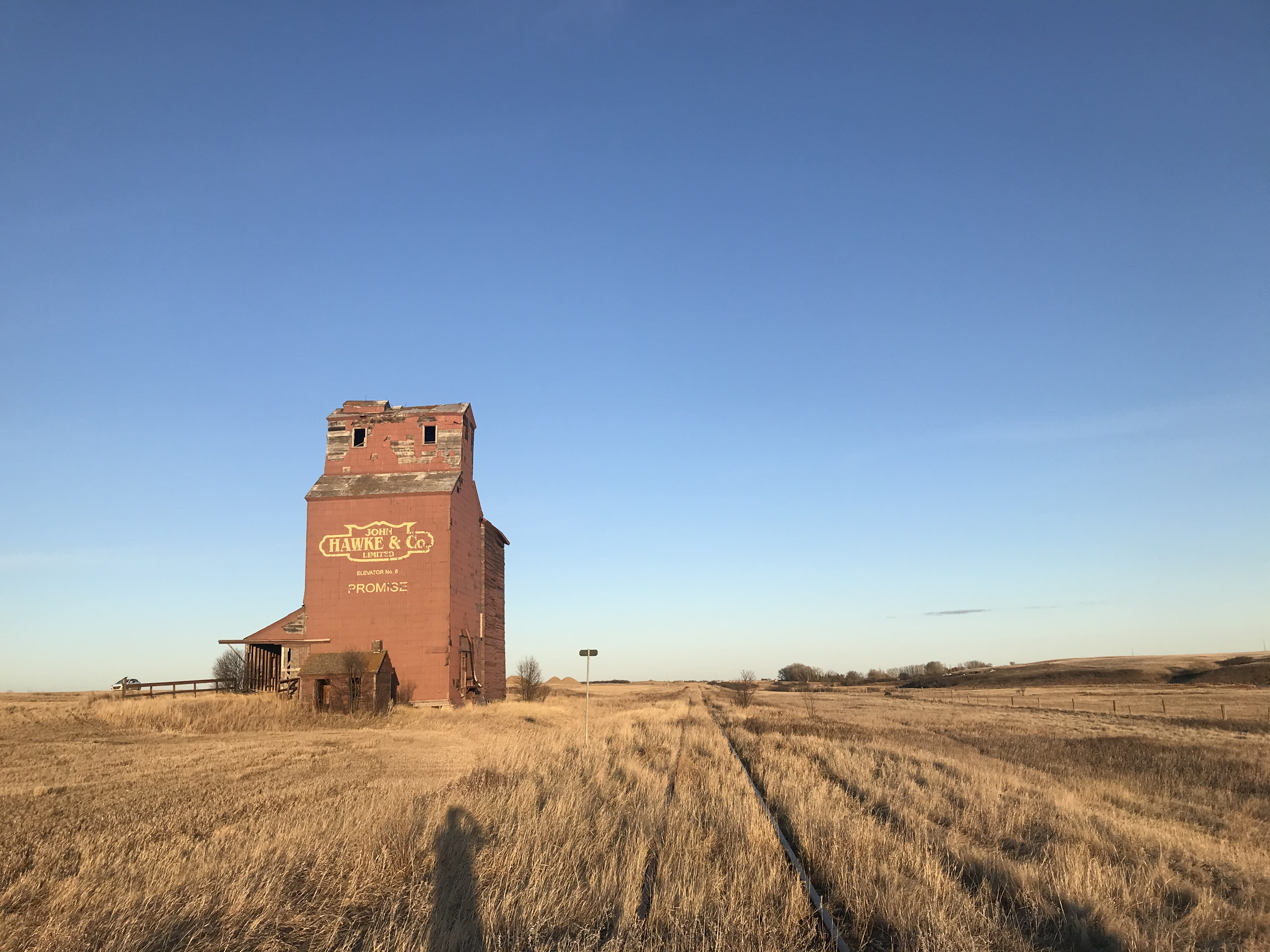
- Grain elevator and railway tracks at Brooking

- Location of Brooking in Saskatchewan Hamlet of Brooking (Canada)
- Coordinates: 49.5000°N 104.4172°W
- Country: Canada
- Province: Saskatchewan
- Region: South East, Saskatchewan
- Census division: Division No. 4
- Rural Municipality: Laurier
- Established: N/A
- Incorporated (Village): 1917

Population (2001)
  - Total: 0
- Postal code: S4H 258
- Area code: 306

Brooking was once a community in the province of Saskatchewan, Canada. It was named after Brookings, South Dakota.

== See also ==
- List of communities in Saskatchewan
- List of hamlets in Saskatchewan
- Lists of ghost towns in Canada
- List of ghost towns in Saskatchewan
