= Division No. 2, Saskatchewan =

Census division in Canada

Coordinates: 49°40′12″N 103°51′36″W

Division No. 2
- Census division in Saskatchewan
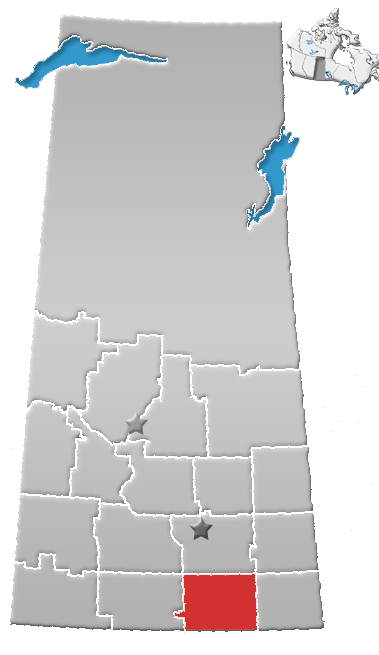
- Country: Canada
- Province: Saskatchewan

Area
  - Total: 16,859.18 km^{2} (6,509.37 sq mi)
- As of 2016

Population (2016)
  - Total: 22,825
  - Density: 1.3539/km^{2} (3.5065/sq mi)

Division No. 2 is one of eighteen census divisions in the province of Saskatchewan, Canada, as defined by Statistics Canada. It is located in the south-southeastern part of the province, on the United States border. The most populous community in this division is Weyburn.

== Demographics ==
In the 2021 Canadian census conducted by Statistics Canada, Division No. 2 had a population of 22,497 living in 9,362 of its 10,642 total private dwellings, a change of −1.4% from its 2016 population of 22,825. With a land area of 16,535.88 km^{2} (6,384.54 sq mi), it had a population density of 1.4/km^{2} (3.5/sq mi) in 2021.

Knowledge of languages in Division No. 2 (1991−2021)
Language	2021		2011		2001		1991	
Language	Pop.	%	Pop.	%	Pop.	%	Pop.	%
English	21,905	99.79%	21,760	99.82%	21,070	99.95%	23,610	99.94%
Tagalog	665	3.03%	170	0.78%	35	0.17%	10	0.04%
French	380	1.73%	440	2.02%	710	3.37%	675	2.86%
German (Note: Combined responses of the High German languages, including Standard German, Pennsylvania German, Swiss German, and Yiddish.)	255	1.16%	545	2.5%	385	1.83%	675	2.86%
Hindustani (Note: Combined responses of Hindi and Urdu as they form mutually intelligible registers of the Hindustani language.)	210	0.96%	65	0.3%	0	0%	0	0%
Russian	115	0.52%	50	0.23%	35	0.17%	0	0%
Ukrainian	110	0.5%	95	0.44%	145	0.69%	315	1.33%
Punjabi	100	0.46%	0	0%	0	0%	0	0%
Spanish	90	0.41%	140	0.64%	55	0.26%	25	0.11%
Chinese (Note: Combined responses of the Chinese languages, including Mandarin, Cantonese, Min Nan, Hakka, Wu (Shanghainese), Min Dong, Chinese, n.o.s., and Chinese languages, n.i.e..)	55	0.25%	25	0.11%	60	0.28%	45	0.19%
Polish	35	0.16%	75	0.34%	130	0.62%	170	0.72%
Arabic	30	0.14%	0	0%	10	0.05%	10	0.04%
Vietnamese	25	0.11%	25	0.11%	15	0.07%	15	0.06%
Greek	25	0.11%	0	0%	0	0%	10	0.04%
Portuguese	20	0.09%	0	0%	10	0.05%	0	0%
Dutch	10	0.05%	130	0.6%	45	0.21%	85	0.36%
Hungarian	10	0.05%	0	0%	30	0.14%	50	0.21%
Italian	0	0%	0	0%	10	0.05%	10	0.04%
Persian (Note: Combined responses of Iranian Persian, Dari, and Persian (Farsi), n.o.s., as they form mutually intelligible registers of the Persian language)	0	0%	0	0%	0	0%	25	0.11%
Total responses	21,950	97.57%	21,800	97.91%	21,080	97.43%	23,625	97.68%
Total population	22,497	100%	22,266	100%	21,635	100%	24,186	100%

== Census subdivisions ==
The following census subdivisions (municipalities or municipal equivalents) are located within Saskatchewan's Division No. 2.

=== Cities ===
- Weyburn

=== Towns ===
- Bengough
- Midale
- Milestone
- Ogema
- Radville
- Yellow Grass

=== Villages ===
- Avonlea
- Ceylon
- Creelman
- Fillmore
- Goodwater
- Halbrite
- Lang
- Macoun
- McTaggart
- Minton
- Osage
- Pangman
- Torquay

=== Rural municipalities ===
- RM No. 6 Cambria
- RM No. 7 Souris Valley
- RM No. 8 Lake Alma
- RM No. 9 Surprise Valley
- RM No. 10 Happy Valley
- RM No. 36 Cymri
- RM No. 37 Lomond
- RM No. 38 Laurier
- RM No. 39 The Gap
- RM No. 40 Bengough
- RM No. 66 Griffin
- RM No. 67 Weyburn
- RM No. 68 Brokenshell
- RM No. 69 Norton
- RM No. 70 Key West
- RM No. 96 Fillmore
- RM No. 97 Wellington
- RM No. 98 Scott
- RM No. 99 Caledonia
- RM No. 100 Elmsthorpe

=== Indian reserves ===
- Piapot Cree Nation
  - Piapot Cree First Nation 75H

== See also ==
- List of census divisions of Saskatchewan
- List of communities in Saskatchewan
- SARM Division No. 2
