= SARM Division No. 2 =

Division in Saskatchewan, Canada

SARM Division No. 2 is a division of the Saskatchewan Association of Rural Municipalities (SARM) within the Canadian province of Saskatchewan. It is located in the south-central area of the province. The current director for division 2 is Cody Jordison.

== List of RMs in Division No. 2 ==
By numerical RM No.

- RM No. 8 Lake Alma
- RM No. 9 Surprise Valley
- RM No. 10 Happy Valley
- RM No. 11 Hart Butte
- RM No. 12 Poplar Valley
- RM No. 38 Laurier
- RM No. 39 The Gap
- RM No. 40 Bengough
- RM No. 42 Willow Bunch
- RM No. 43 Old Post
- RM No. 44 Waverley
- RM No. 68 Brokenshell
- RM No. 69 Norton
- RM No. 70 Key West
- RM No. 71 Excel
- RM No. 72 Lake of the Rivers
- RM No. 73 Stonehenge
- RM No. 74 Wood River
- RM No. 98 Scott
- RM No. 99 Caledonia
- RM No. 100 Elmsthorpe
- RM No. 101 Terrell
- RM No. 102 Lake Johnston
- RM No. 103 Sutton
- RM No. 104 Gravelbourg
- RM No. 128 Lajord
- RM No. 129 Bratt's Lake
- RM No. 130 Redburn
- RM No. 131 Baildon
- RM No. 132 Hillsborough
- RM No. 133 Rodgers
- RM No. 134 Shamrock
- RM No. 158 Edenwold
- RM No. 159 Sherwood
- RM No. 160 Pense
- RM No. 161 Moose Jaw
- RM No. 162 Caron
- RM No. 163 Wheatlands
- RM No. 164 Chaplin
- RM No. 189 Lumsden
- RM No. 190 Dufferin
- RM No. 191 Marquis
- RM No. 193 Eyebrow
- RM No. 194 Enfield
- RM No. 218 Cupar
- RM No. 219 Longlaketon
- RM No. 220 McKillop
- RM No. 221 Sarnia
- RM No. 222 Craik
- RM No. 223 Huron
- RM No. 224 Maple Bush

== See also ==
- List of regions of Saskatchewan
- List of census divisions of Saskatchewan
- List of communities in Saskatchewan
- Geography of Saskatchewan
