= Lake Alma =

Community in Saskatchewan, Canada

- Special service area
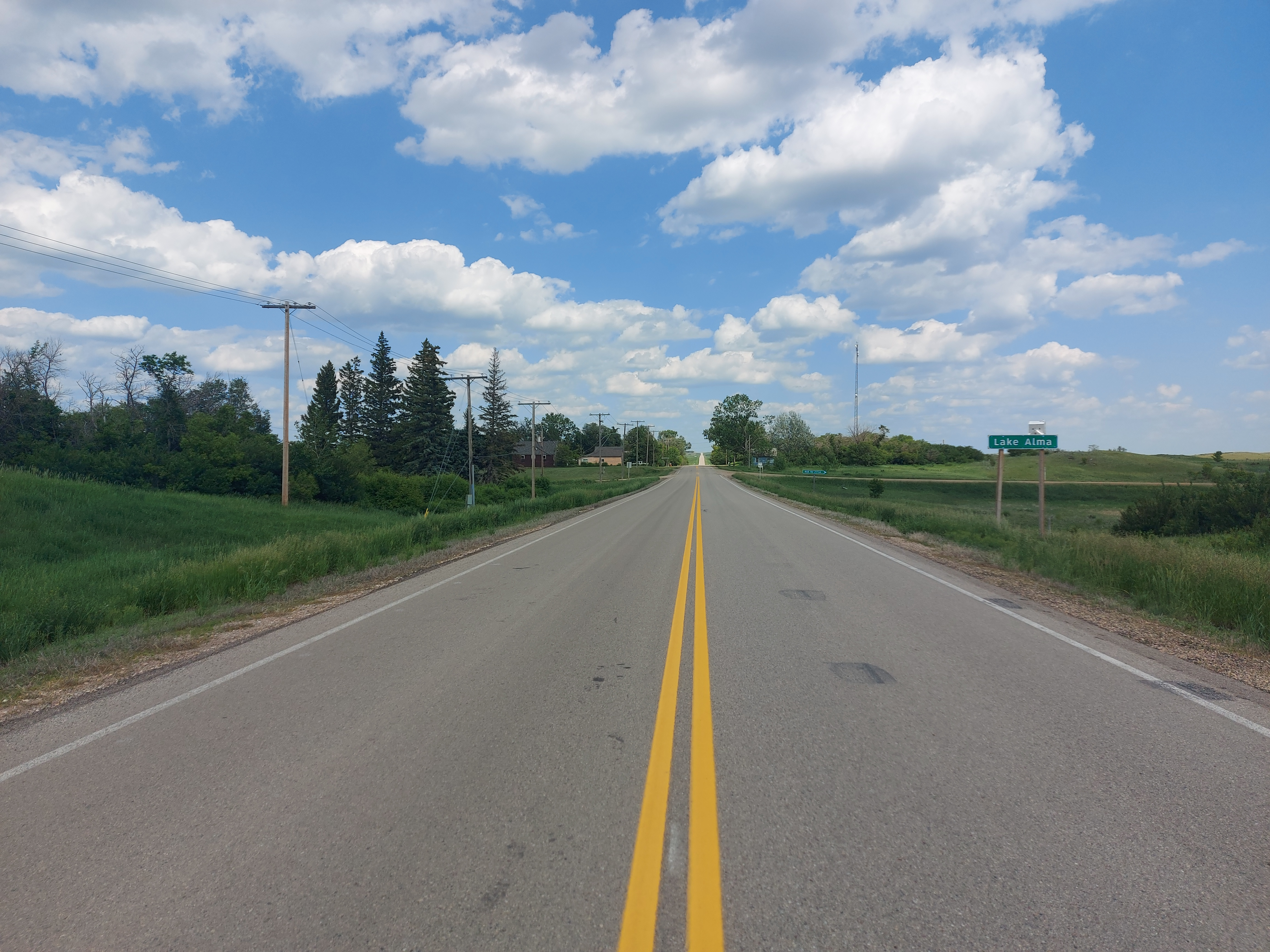
- Highway 18 heading east into Lake Alma

- Location of Lake Alma Lake Alma (Canada)
- Coordinates: 49°08′41″N 104°11′51″W
- Country: Canada
- Province: Saskatchewan
- Region: Southeast
- Census division: 2
- Rural municipality: Lake Alma
- Incorporated (village): January 1, 1949
- Dissolved (special service area): July 31, 2018

Government

Area
  - Total: 0.47 km^{2} (0.18 sq mi)

Population (2016)
  - Total: 30
  - Density: 64.4/km^{2} (167/sq mi)
- Time zone: UTC-6 (CST)
- Postal code: S0C 1M0
- Area code: 306
- Highways: Highway 18; Highway 28

Lake Alma is a special service area within the Rural Municipality of Lake Alma No. 8, Saskatchewan, Canada that held village status prior to August 2018. The community shares its name with the nearby Alma Lake and surrounding rural municipality. Lake Alma had a population of 30 in the 2016, 2011 and 2006 Censuses).

== History ==
Lake Alma incorporated as a village on January 1, 1949. It restructured on July 31, 2018, relinquishing its village status in favour of becoming a special service area under the jurisdiction of the Rural Municipality of Lake Alma No. 8.

== Demographics ==
Canada census – Lake Alma No. 8 community profile

	2021	2016	2011
Population	269 (-1.1% from 2016)	30 (0.0% from 2011)	30 (0.0% from 2006)
Land area	785.50 km^{2} (303.28 sq mi)	0.47 km^{2} (0.18 sq mi)	0.47 km^{2} (0.18 sq mi)
Population density	0.3/km^{2} (0.78/sq mi)	64.4/km^{2} (167/sq mi)	64.4/km^{2} (167/sq mi)
Median age	44.8 (M: 48.4, F: 42.0)
Private dwellings	142 (total) 114 (occupied)	17 (total)	22 (total)
Median household income	$64,500

References: 2021 2016 2011

== See also ==
- List of communities in Saskatchewan
- List of special service areas in Saskatchewan
