= Western Christian College =

Western Christian College and High School

Location
- Regina, Saskatchewan; 50.4635°N 104.6445°W

Information
- Type: Bible College & High School
- Established: 1945
- Closed: 2012
- Former Chief Operating Officer: Karen Kristianson Vogel
- Faculty: 21 College & High School
- Enrollment: Under 100 high school & undergraduate
- Area: 16 acres (65,000 m²)

Western Christian College (WCC) was a private Christian college associated with the Churches of Christ located in Regina, Saskatchewan, Canada. WCC also had a high school program which results in the overall institution being known in many cases as Western Christian College and High School.

WCC was founded in Radville, Saskatchewan. The school was also located in Weyburn, Saskatchewan and Dauphin, Manitoba before it settled in Regina. It occupied the former premises of the Ambrose University College and Seminary, which moved from Regina to Calgary.

On January 31, 2012, it was announced that Western Christian College's board had voted to cease its operations effective June 30, 2012, after 67 years of operation. The group cited declining enrollments, having only 76 students (of only one were in its collegiate program). The building continued operations as the Orr Centre, which housed its auditorium, offices, and a University of Saskatchewan nursing campus. In 2019, the building began to be demolished, with the property being redeveloped as a retail centre.
