= Hardy, Saskatchewan =

Hamlet in Saskatchewan, Canada

Coordinates: 49.4823°N 104.7215°W

Hardy is a hamlet in the Rural Municipality of The Gap No. 39, Saskatchewan, Canada. The community had a population of 5 in 2001. It previously held the status of village until January 1, 2000. The hamlet is located 82 kilometres (51 mi) south-west of the city of Weyburn, 10 kilometres (6.2 mi) west of Highway 6, and 5 kilometres (3.1 mi) north of Highway 705. Hardy was named for the great 19th-century English novelist and poet Thomas Hardy.

== Demographics ==
Prior to January 1, 2000, Hardy was incorporated as a village, and was restructured as a hamlet under the jurisdiction of the RM of The Gap No. 39 on that date.

Canada census – Hardy, Saskatchewan community profile

Population
Land area
Population density
Median age
Private dwellings
Median household income

== See also ==
- List of communities in Saskatchewan
- List of hamlets in Saskatchewan
