= Rural Municipality of Weyburn No. 67 =

Rural municipality in Saskatchewan, Canada

Weyburn No. 67
- Rural municipality
- Rural Municipality of Weyburn No. 67
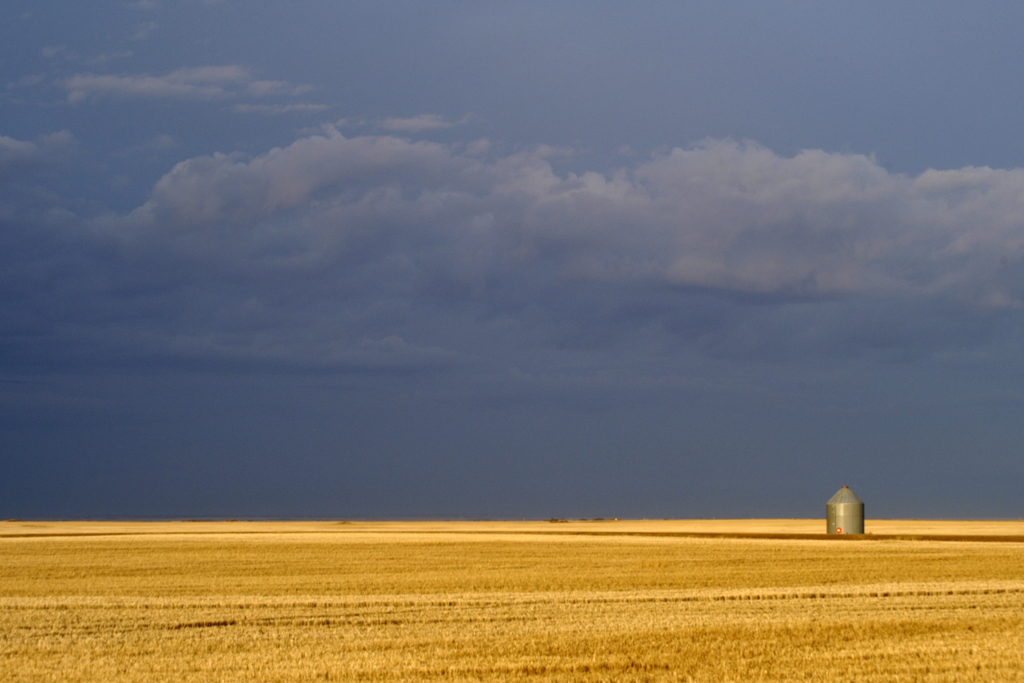
- Open prairie outside Weyburn

- Location of the RM of Weyburn No. 67 in Saskatchewan
- Coordinates: 49.651°N 103.839°W
- Country: Canada
- Province: Saskatchewan
- Census division: 2
- SARM division: 1
- Federal riding: Souris—Moose Mountain
- Provincial riding: Weyburn-Big Muddy
- Formed: December 13, 1909

Government
  - Reeve: James "Bud" Grohn
  - Governing body: RM of Weyburn No. 67 Council
  - Administrator: Jenna Smolinski
  - Office location: Weyburn

Area (2016)
  - Land: 808.33 km^{2} (312.10 sq mi)

Population (2016)
  - Total: 1,064
  - Density: 1.3/km^{2} (3.4/sq mi)
- Time zone: CST
  - Summer (DST): CST
- Postal code: S4H 3E7
- Area codes: 306 and 639
- Website: Official website

The Rural Municipality of Weyburn No. 67 (2016 population: 1,064) is a rural municipality (RM) in the Canadian province of Saskatchewan within Census Division No. 2 and SARM Division No. 1. It is located in the southeast portion of the province.

== History ==
The RM of Weyburn No. 67 incorporated as a rural municipality on December 13, 1909.

== Geography ==
=== Communities and localities ===
The following urban municipalities are surrounded by the RM.

Cities

- Weyburn

Villages

- McTaggart

The following unincorporated communities are located within the RM.

Organized hamlets

- North Weyburn

Localities

- Grassdale
- Mansur
- Ralph
- Talmage

== Demographics ==
Population history (1981–2016)
Year	Pop.	±%
1981	1,071	—
1986	1,080	+0.8%
1991	885	−18.1%
1996	867	−2.0%
2001	864	−0.3%
2006	888	+2.8%
2011	1,048	+18.0%
2016	1,064	+1.5%
Source: Statistics Canada via Saskatchewan Bureau of Statistics

In the 2021 Census of Population conducted by Statistics Canada, the RM of Weyburn No. 67 had a population of 1,103 living in 392 of its 427 total private dwellings, a change of 3.7% from its 2016 population of 1,064. With a land area of 808.5 km^{2} (312.2 sq mi), it had a population density of 1.4/km^{2} (3.5/sq mi) in 2021.

In the 2016 Census of Population, the RM of Weyburn No. 67 recorded a population of 1,064 living in 383 of its 418 total private dwellings, a 1.5% change from its 2011 population of 1,048. With a land area of 808.33 km^{2} (312.10 sq mi), it had a population density of 1.3/km^{2} (3.4/sq mi) in 2016.

== Government ==
The RM of Weyburn No. 67 is governed by an elected municipal council and an appointed administrator that meets on the second Wednesday of every month. The reeve of the RM is James "Bud" Grohn while its administrator is Jenna Smolinski. The RM's office is located in Weyburn.

== Transportation ==
The RM is bisected by both Highway 13, Highway 35 and Highway 39 and is home to the Weyburn Airport.

== See also ==
- List of rural municipalities in Saskatchewan
