= Rural Municipality of Laurier No. 38 =

Rural municipality in Saskatchewan, Canada

Laurier No. 38
- Rural municipality
- Rural Municipality of Laurier No. 38
- Location of the RM of Laurier No. 38 in Saskatchewan
- Coordinates: 49.427°N 104.239°W
- Country: Canada
- Province: Saskatchewan
- Census division: 2
- SARM division: 2
- Federal riding: Souris—Moose Mountain
- Provincial riding: Weyburn-Big Muddy
- Formed: December 13, 1909

Government
  - Reeve: Alan Krausher
  - Governing body: RM of Laurier No. 38 Council
  - Administrator: Sam Kalmbach
  - Office location: Radville

Area (2016)
  - Land: 840.4 km^{2} (324.5 sq mi)

Population (2021)
  - Total: 253
  - Density: 0.4/km^{2} (1.0/sq mi)
- Time zone: CST
  - Summer (DST): CST
- Postal code: S0C 2G0
- Area codes: 306 and 639

The Rural Municipality of Laurier No. 38 (2021 population: 253) is a rural municipality (RM) in the Canadian province of Saskatchewan within Census Division No. 2 and SARM Division No. 2. It is located in the southeast portion of the province.

== History ==
The RM of Laurier No. 38 was incorporated as a rural municipality on December 13, 1909.

Heritage properties

There are two historical buildings located within the RM.

- Soda Lake School - Constructed in 1914, as a one-room school, the building now houses the Soda Lake Community Centre in Soda Lake. The school operated from 1914 until 1953.
- Souris Valley Church - Constructed in 1907 as a Catholic church, St. Germaine Parish of the Archdiocese of St. Boniface, the church in Souris Valley. The church closed in 1970, and the building has since been operated as the Souris Valley Co-operative Memorial Club. The building has also been called the St. Germaine Roman Catholic Church.

== Geography ==
=== Communities and localities ===
The following urban municipalities are surrounded by the RM.

Towns

- Radville

The following unincorporated communities are within the RM.

Localities

- Dandonneau
- Neptune
- Souris Valley

Brooking, a ghost town, is also within the RM.

== Demographics ==
Population history (1981–2016)
Year	Pop.	±%
1981	582	—
1986	537	−7.7%
1991	471	−12.3%
1996	434	−7.9%
2001	402	−7.4%
2006	350	−12.9%
2011	321	−8.3%
2016	296	−7.8%
2021	253	−14.5%
Source: Statistics Canada via Saskatchewan Bureau of Statistics

In the 2021 Census of Population conducted by Statistics Canada, the RM of Laurier No. 38 had a population of 253 living in 95 of its 110 total private dwellings, a change of −14.5% from its 2016 population of 296. With a land area of 816.25 km^{2} (315.16 sq mi), it had a population density of 0.3/km^{2} (0.8/sq mi) in 2021.

In the 2021 Census of Population, the RM of Laurier No. 38 recorded 253 living in 105 of its 115 total private dwellings, a −7.8% change from its 2011 population of 321. With a land area of 840.4 km^{2} (324.5 sq mi), it had a population density of 0.4/km^{2} (0.9/sq mi) in 2016.

== Government ==
The RM of Laurier No. 38 is governed by an elected municipal council and an appointed administrator that meets on the second Tuesday of every month. The RM's reeve is Alan Krausher, and its administrator is Sam Kalmbach. The RM's office is located in Radville.

== Transportation ==
The Radville Airport is located within the municipality.

== Gallery ==
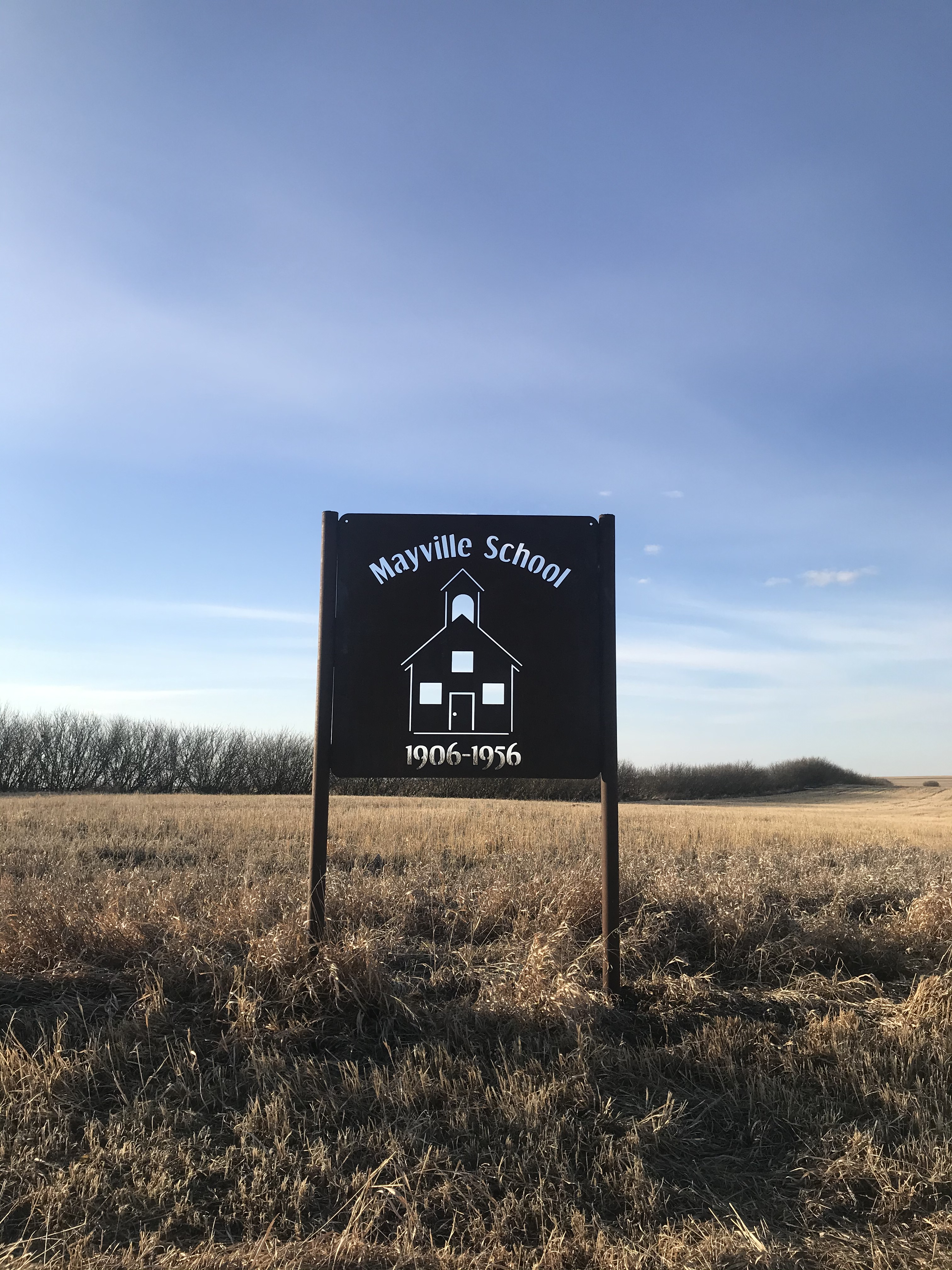
Mayville School site

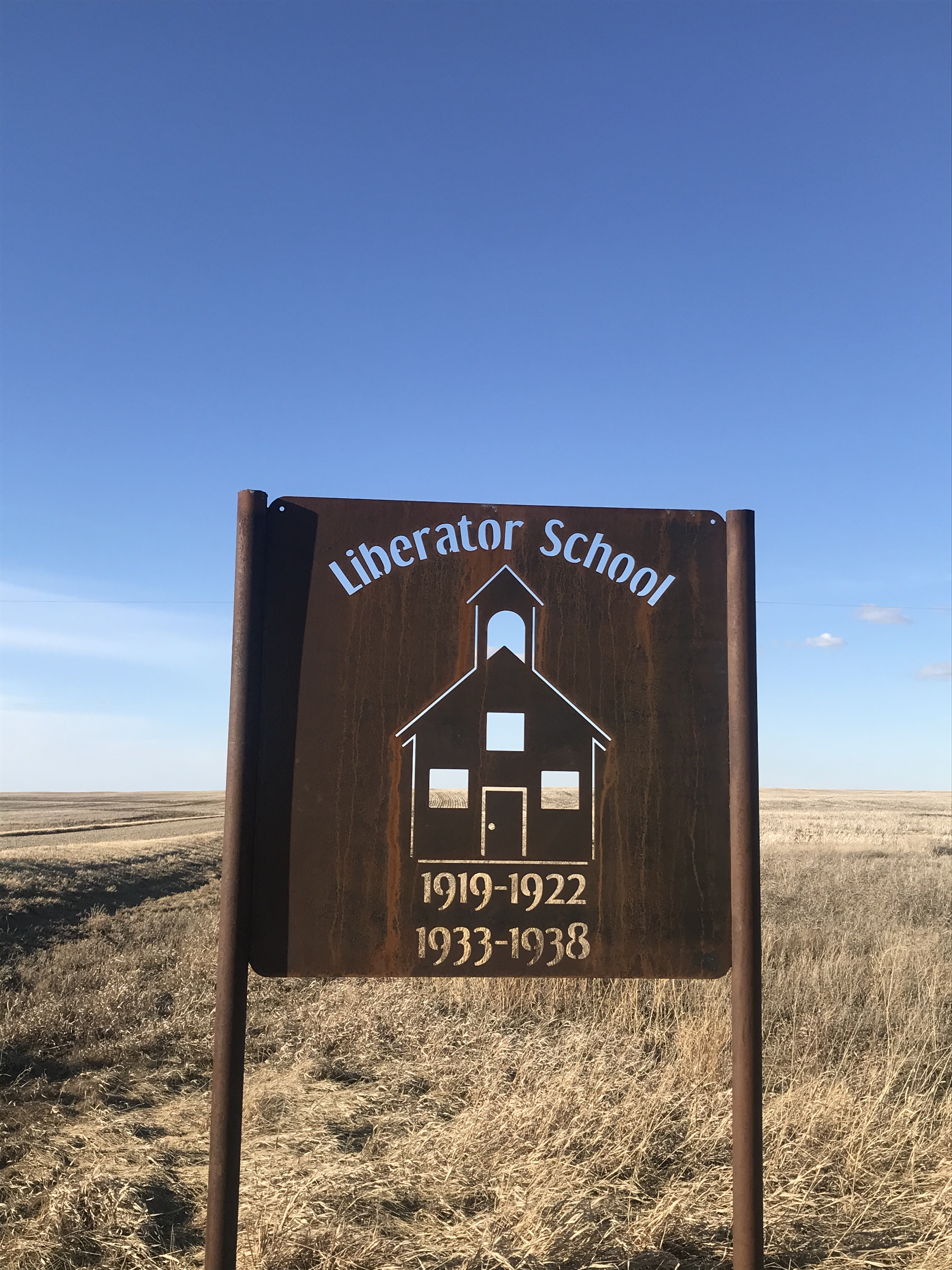
Liberator School site

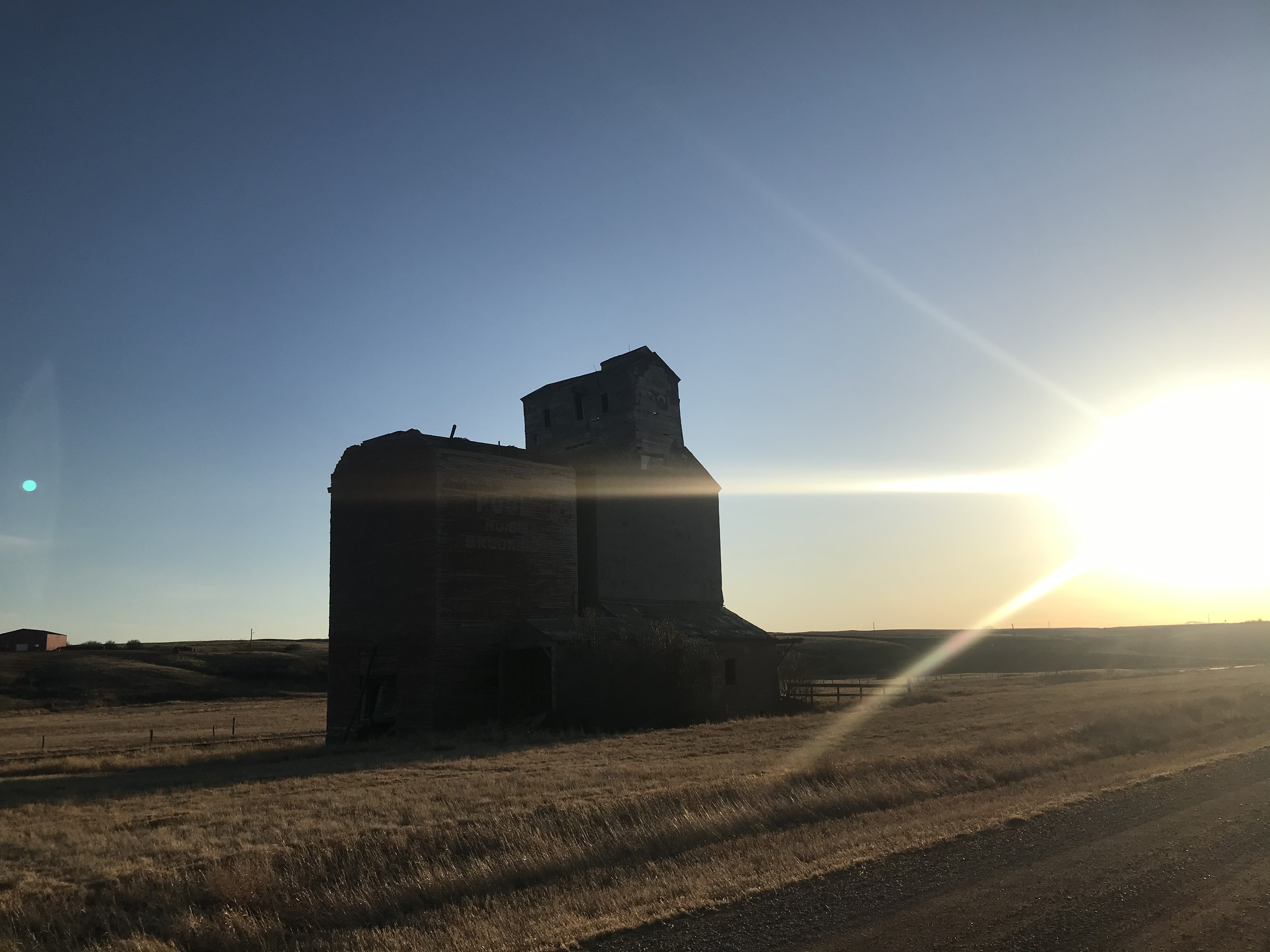
The grain elevator in Brooking

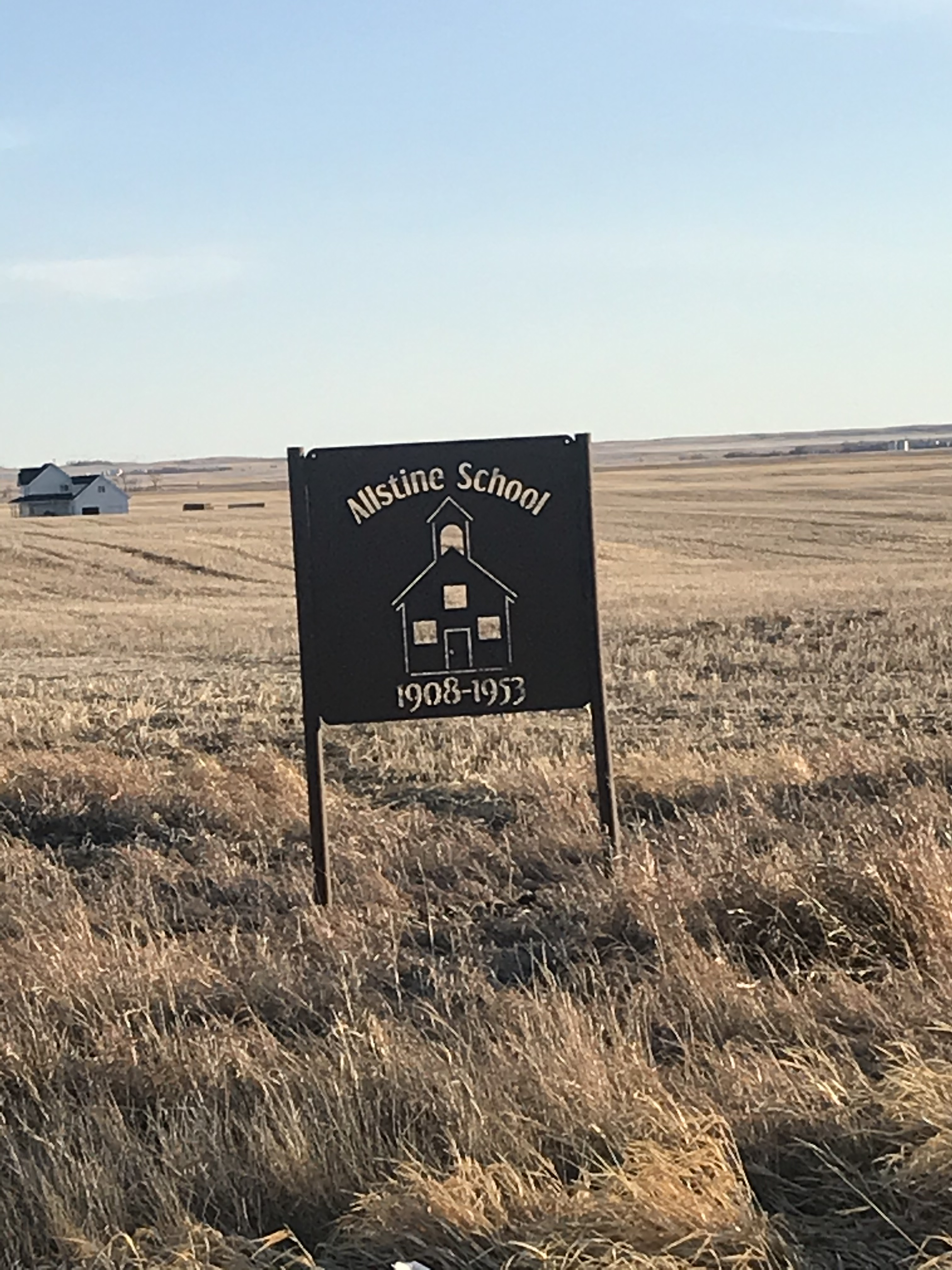
Allstine School site

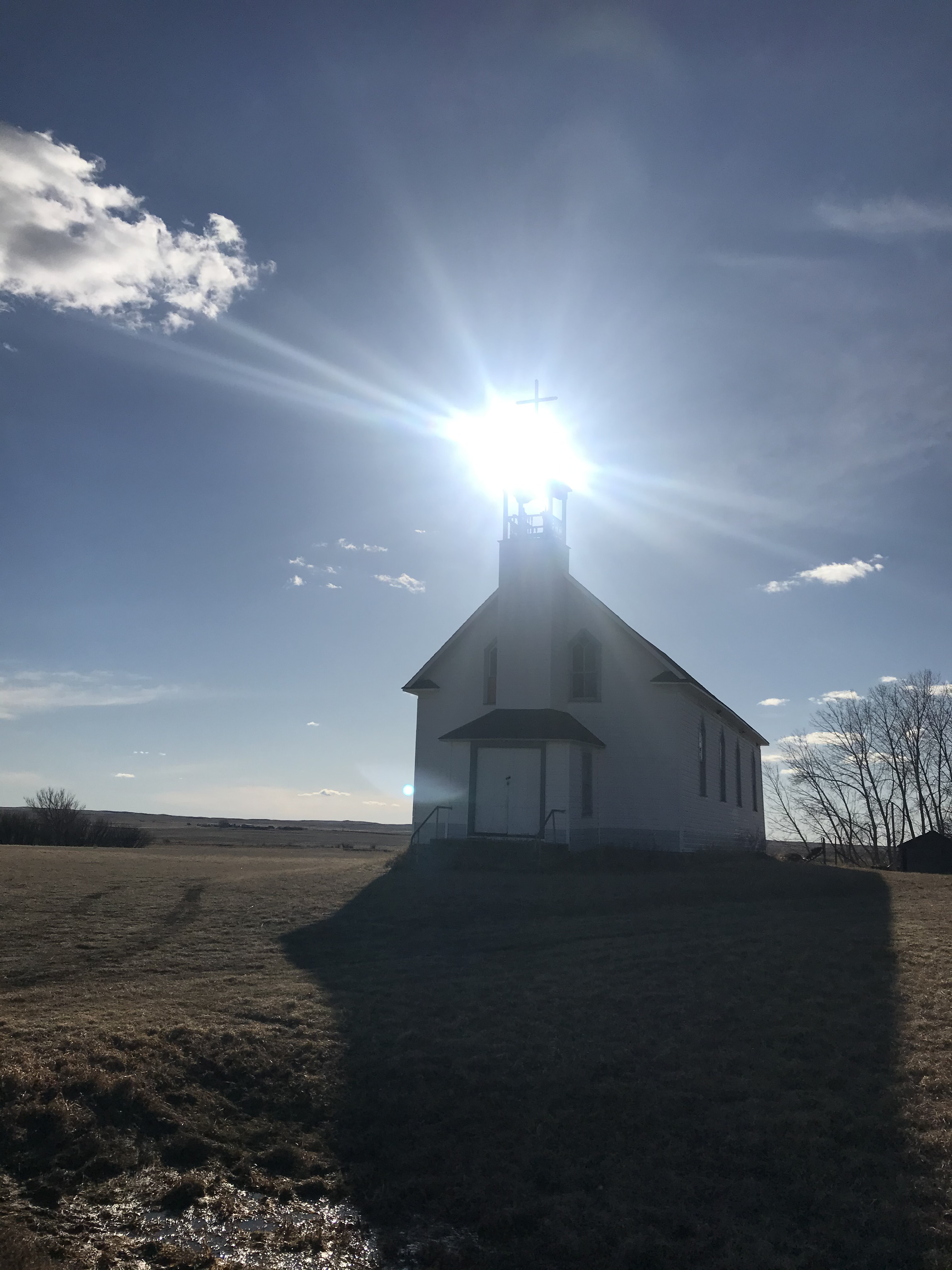
Rural church

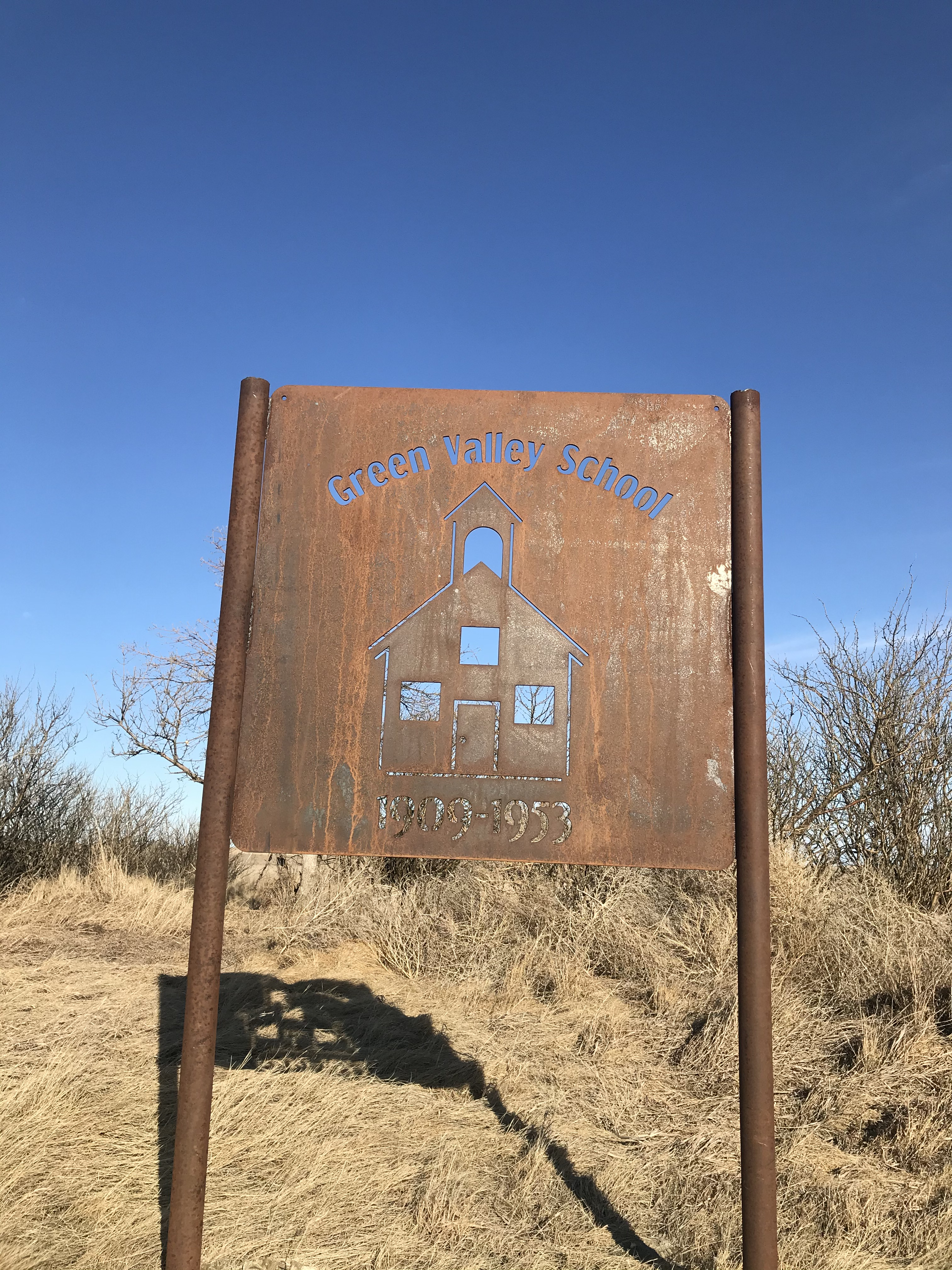
Green Valley School site

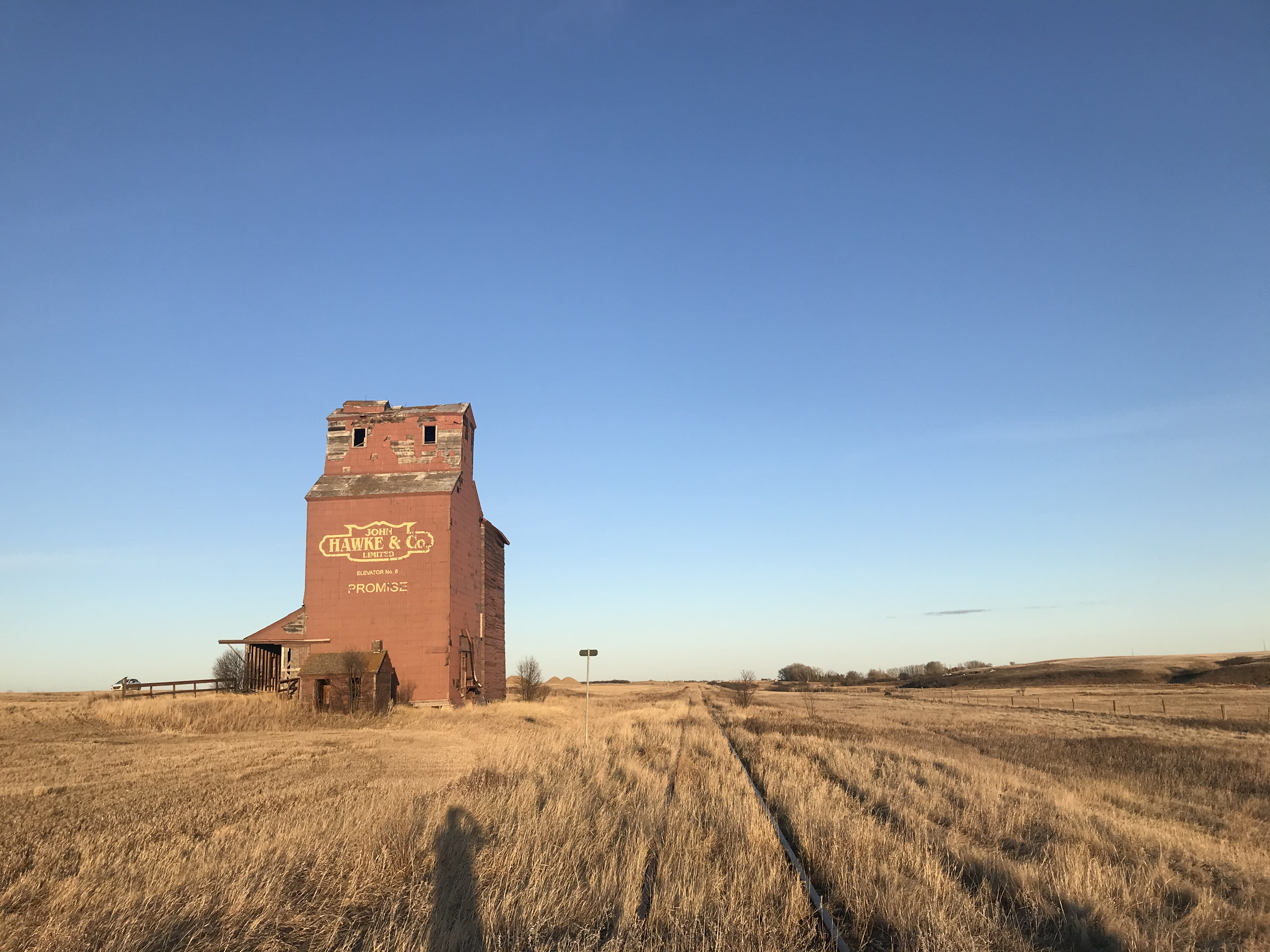
Grain elevator and railway tracks in Brooking

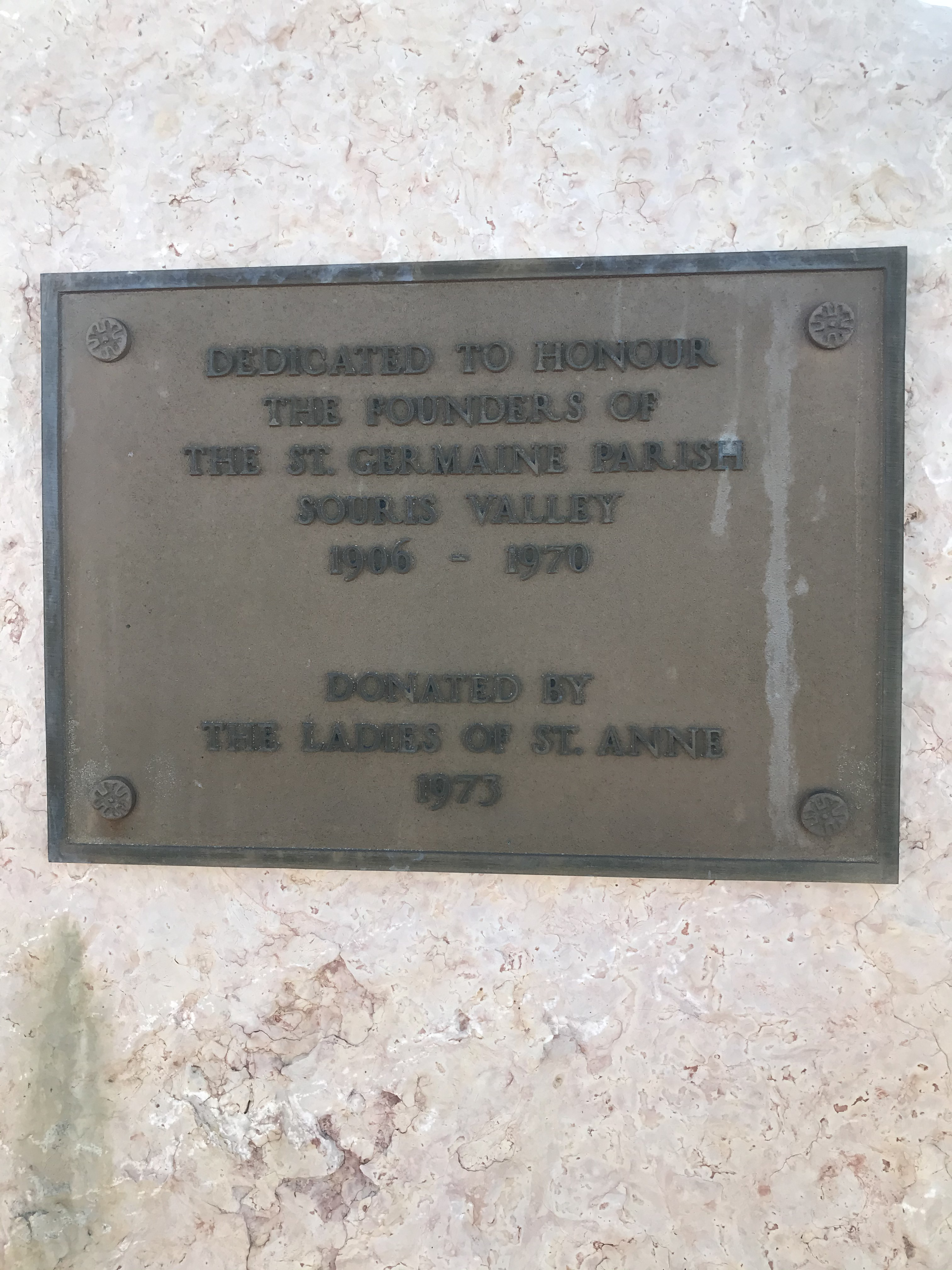
St. Germaine Parish plaque

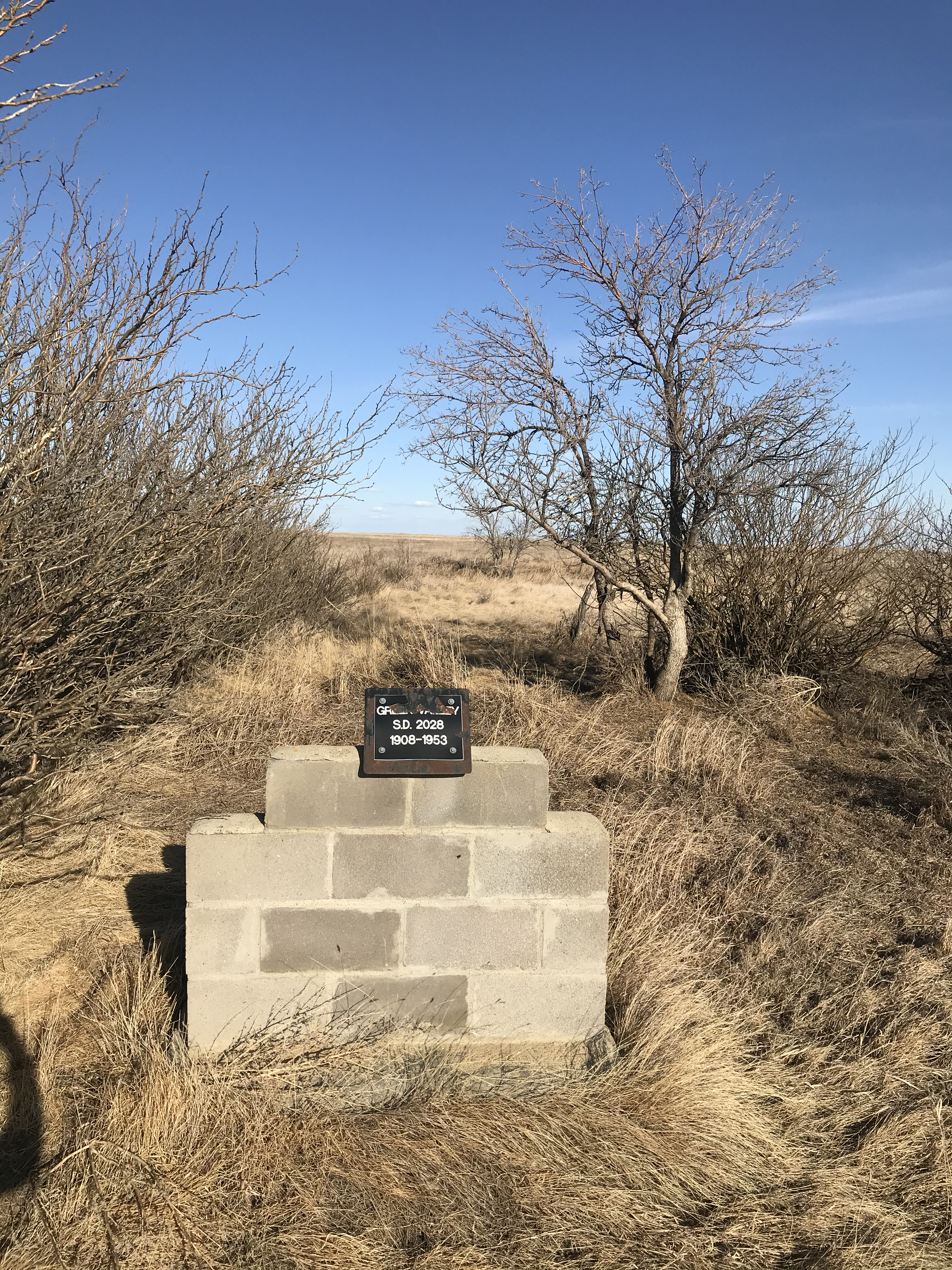
Green Valley School site
