= Radville =

Town in Saskatchewan, Canada

- Town
- Radville, c. 1970

- Town of Radville in Saskatchewan
- Coordinates: 49°28′40″N 104°17′45″W
- Country: Canada
- Province: Saskatchewan

Government
  - Mayor: Robert Stadnick
  - Governing body: Radville Town Council

Area
  - Total: 2.16 km^{2} (0.83 sq mi)

Population (2011)
  - Total: 860
  - Density: 398.6/km^{2} (1,032/sq mi)
- Time zone: UTC-6 (CST)
- Postal code span: List of S Postal Codes of Canada
- Area code: 306
- Highways: Highway 28 / Highway 377

Radville is a town in the Canadian province of Saskatchewan, in the RM of Laurier No. 38. It was incorporated in 1911 after being settled in 1895. Highway 28 and Highway 377 pass through the town. Nearby communities include the village of Ceylon, 23 km to the west, and the city of Weyburn, 51 km to the north-east. Major nearby urban centres include Regina, which is 148 km to the north, and Moose Jaw, which is 143 km north-west.

Long Creek runs along the northern and eastern side of the town, providing fishing and recreation to the locals. To the south of town, a second dam is located for the water supply pumphouse.

== History ==
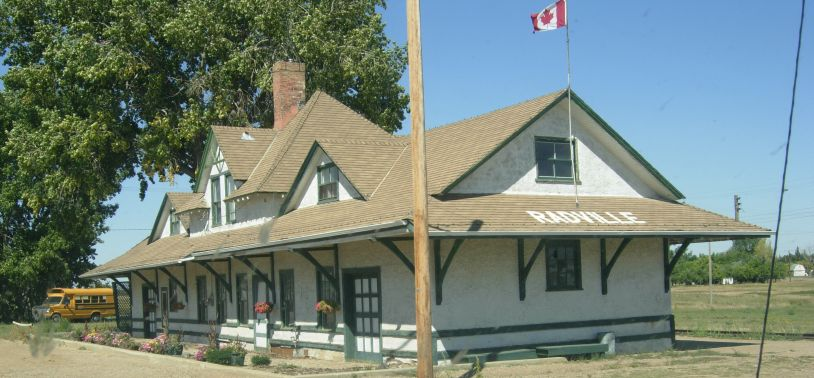
Radville CN Train Station located on the east side of Main Street

Radville used to be a major hub of activity throughout the 1920s to 1970s with a livery, the Canadian National Railway (CN), and five grain elevators. Radville was also a CN divisional point. It had a roundhouse with turntable, water tank, sand house, coal dock, ice house, bunkhouse, Roadmaster office, stores, stockyard, loading platform, freight, and express service. The Radville railway station still remains, though now used as a museum. At one time in the town, there was a blacksmith shop, four general stores, a dress shop, bakery, appliance store, Credit Union, jeweller, and two barber shops. This diminished when Highway 28 was upgraded in about 1975. The next largest urban centre of Weyburn received more and more of Radville's local and regional commerce.

=== Notable buildings ===
One of the historic buildings in Radville is the local restaurant. The building started as the Bon Ton Barber Shop and the first doctor in Radville, Dr. Joseph P. O'Shea's office, which later became the home of numerous subsequent restaurants.

Radville has had several theatres. The last one, the Oasis Theatre, closed in 1977, showing Star Wars as one of its last movies. After standing empty for a few years, the Oasis was bought by local entrepreneur George Hays and converted into the Alley Oops bowling alley. The newspaper South Saskatchewan Star was owned and operated by Oscar Stitt. A few years afterwards, George Hays purchased the local newspaper, the Radville Star, and moved the publication into the same building. The Princess Theatre, owned by Ham Ferris, closed much earlier and was converted into a senior citizens hall in 1972.

The Canadian Imperial Bank of Commerce, originally the Bank of Commerce, was built in the early 1920s and closed in 2017. The Empire Hotel was built in the early 1920s and is still in operation.

Eva McNaught, who was wife to the fire chief and drayman Harold, ran Eva's Popcorn stand for many years. Due to the warm long languishing summer nights typical of southern prairie towns, many people stayed out in the evenings and enjoyed the Saskatchewan summer weather. A replica of Eva's Popcorn Stand was built in 2010 and runs entirely by volunteers, in the evenings of the summer months.

The Radville CN Station was completely restored in 2010 and is now a museum. Artifacts from local settlers have been collected and are displayed throughout the station. Many activities are hosted at the Museum throughout the year, including the annual "Harvest Day" where locals enjoy an old fashioned outing with live music, a car show, pie contest, silent auction, Soap Box Races on main street, BBQ supper, and beer gardens. This event is usually held in late September.

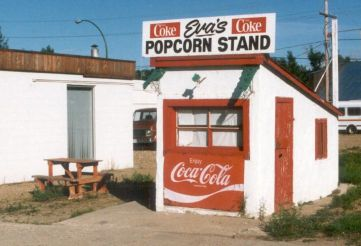
Eva's Popcorn Stand, serving many generations of Radvillites

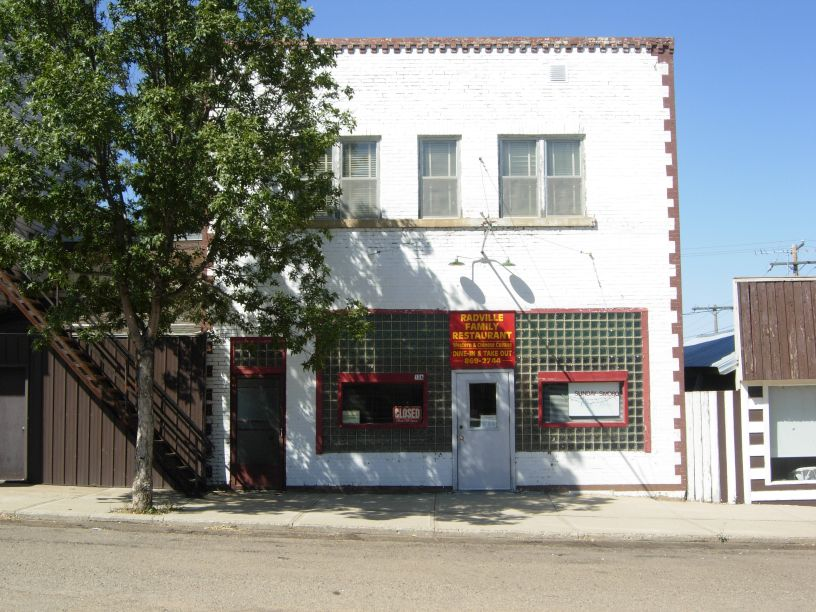
Radville's historic café

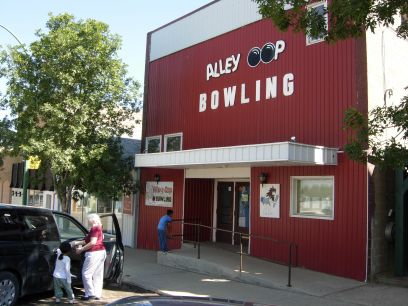
The theatre that became a bowling alley

== Education ==
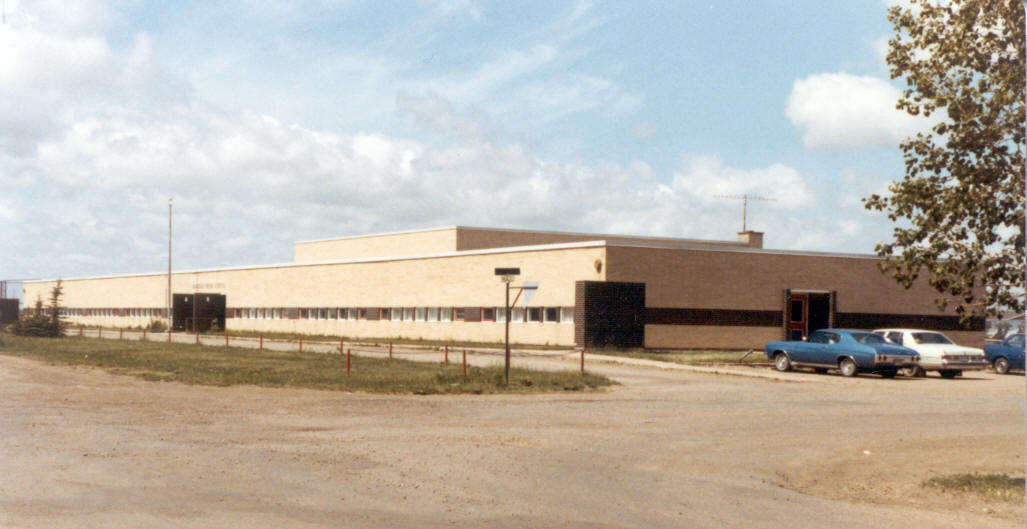
Radville Regional High School

The Radville Public School, a traditional 3-storey cube-shaped red brick building, burned to the ground on January 16, 1977. A mimeograph machine with its alcohol-based image transfer fluid created an explosion in the staff office on the second floor. Picture windows across the street were cracked as a result of the explosion. The new Radville Elementary School opened a few years later. In the interim, the students were sent to classrooms in the high school, and the younger students were sent to the Catholic school.

The high school was called the Radville Regional High School. The Catholic school, commonly called the Separate School, is named St. Olivier School. There was also the Christian College, Western Christian College, located on the east side of Long Creek.

== Larsen Dam ==
About a mile north of the town is a dam on the creek, commonly referred to as the Radville Dam or the Larsen Dam. This water reserve was used as the primary water reservoir for Radville until approximately 1984, at which time the town decided to use deep drilled water wells. The dam is stocked by the wildlife and fisheries department of the government. In the 1970s and the earlier 1980s, the dam was stocked with northern pike (or "jackfish") and fresh water perch. Later it was stocked with walleye and then with trout.

== Radville-Laurier Regional Park ==
Radville-Laurier Regional Park (49.4576°N 104.3027°W) is a regional park that was originally established in 1965. It was renamed in 1975 to its current name to reflect the partnership between the RM and the town. The park is located adjacent to the town and features most of the recreational facilities for the region. There are 42 campsites, 12 of which are electrified, ball diamonds, playgrounds, an outdoor swimming pool, golf course, and a recreation centre.

The recreation centre has a community hall, skating rink (which is home to the Radville Nationals hockey team), curling rink, the aforementioned swimming pool, seasonal concession, and the registration offices. The golf course, called Robertdale Golf and Country Club, is a 9-hole sand greens golf course named in honour of A.R. Robertson, who had devoted many hours to the club. It is a par 35 course with a total of 2,953 yards.

== Transportation ==
- Highway 28
- Highway 377
- Radville Airport

== Demographics ==
In the 2021 Census of Population conducted by Statistics Canada, Radville had a population of 778 living in 331 of its 392 total private dwellings, a change of −3.6% from its 2016 population of 807. With a land area of 2.95 km^{2} (1.14 sq mi), it had a population density of 263.7/km^{2} (683.1/sq mi) in 2021.

Canada census – Radville community profile

	2021	2011
Population	778 (-3.6% from 2016)	860 (+8.4% from 2006)
Land area	2.95 km^{2} (1.14 sq mi)	2.16 km^{2} (0.83 sq mi)
Population density	263.7/km^{2} (683/sq mi)	398.6/km^{2} (1,032/sq mi)
Median age	43.2 (M: 42.8, F: 43.6)
Private dwellings	330 (total)	390 (total)
Median household income

References: 2021 2011

== See also ==
- List of communities in Saskatchewan
- List of francophone communities in Saskatchewan
- List of towns in Saskatchewan
