= North Weyburn =

Community in Saskatchewan, Canada

Coordinates: 49°41′37″N 103°48′26″W

North Weyburn is a hamlet in the Canadian province of Saskatchewan.

== Demographics ==
In the 2021 Census of Population conducted by Statistics Canada, North Weyburn had a population of 96 living in 32 of its 34 total private dwellings, a change of -13.5% from its 2016 population of 111. With a land area of 0.61 km^{2} (0.24 sq mi), it had a population density of 157.4/km^{2} (407.6/sq mi) in 2021.

== See also ==
- Weyburn Airport
- RCAF Station Weyburn
