= Lomond =

Lomond can refer to any of the following:

== Natural features ==
- Ben Lomond, a mountain in Scotland, and many places named for it
- Loch Lomond, a freshwater loch in Scotland
- Lake Lomond, a lake in Minnesota
- Lomond Hills, in Fife

== Localities ==
- Lomond, Alberta, a village in the Canadian province of Alberta
- Rural Municipality of Lomond No. 37, a rural municipality in the Canadian province of Saskatchewan
- Lomond, Newfoundland and Labrador, a defunct settlement in the Canadian province of Newfoundland and Labrador

== Individuals ==
- Britt Lomond (1925–2006), American actor and television producer
- Lomond (horse), an Irish Thoroughbred racehorse which won the 1983 Classic 2,000 Guineas Stakes

== Roads ==
- Lomond Avenue, a street in Seacombe Heights, Adelaide, South Australia, Australia.
- Lomond Avenue, a street in Downers Grove, Illinois, United States.
- Lomond Crescent, a street in Winston Hills, Sydney, Australia.

== See also ==
- Lomond School
- Ben Lomond (disambiguation)
- Loch Lomond (disambiguation)
