= Loch =

Irish and Scottish Gaelic word for a lake or sea inlet

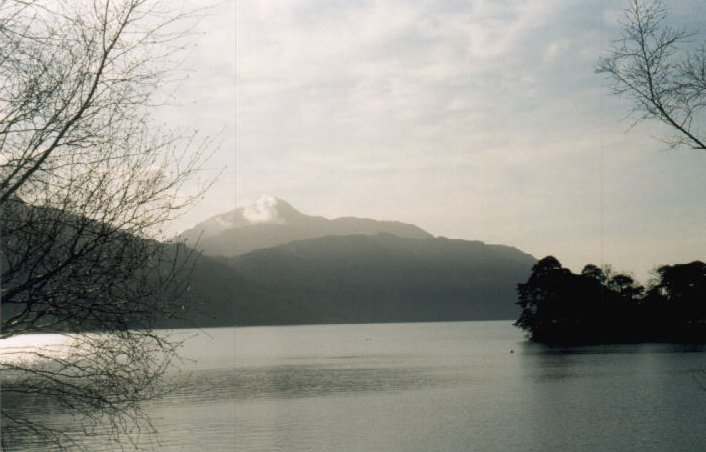
View of Ben Lomond across Loch Lomond

Loch (/lɒx/ LOKH) is a word meaning "lake" or "sea inlet" in Scottish and Irish Gaelic, subsequently borrowed into English. In Irish contexts, it often appears in the anglicized form "lough". A small loch is sometimes called a lochan. Lochs which connect to the sea may be called "sea lochs" or "sea loughs".

== Background ==
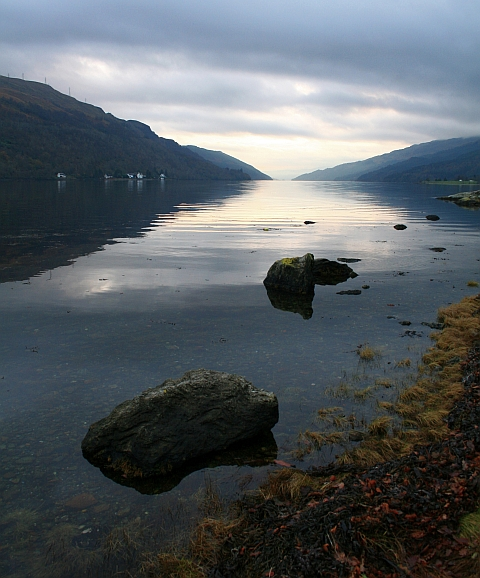
Looking down Loch Long, a long sea loch

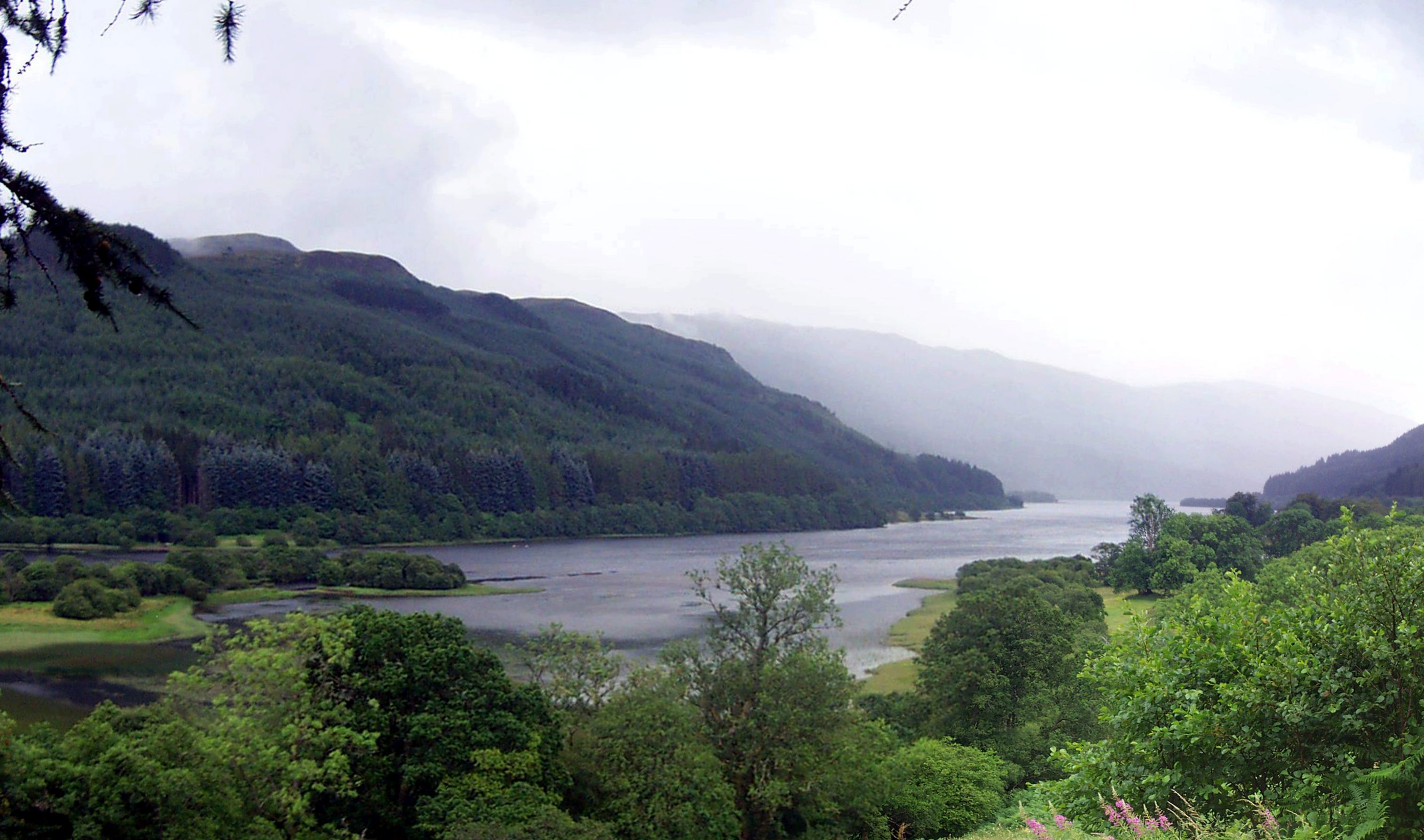
Loch Lubnaig, a reservoir

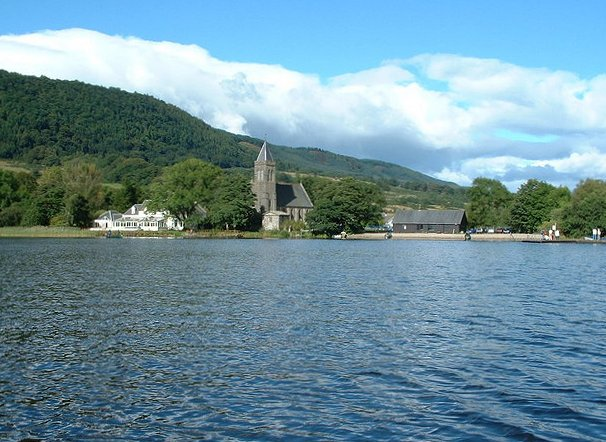
The Lake of Menteith (Loch Innis MoCholmaig)

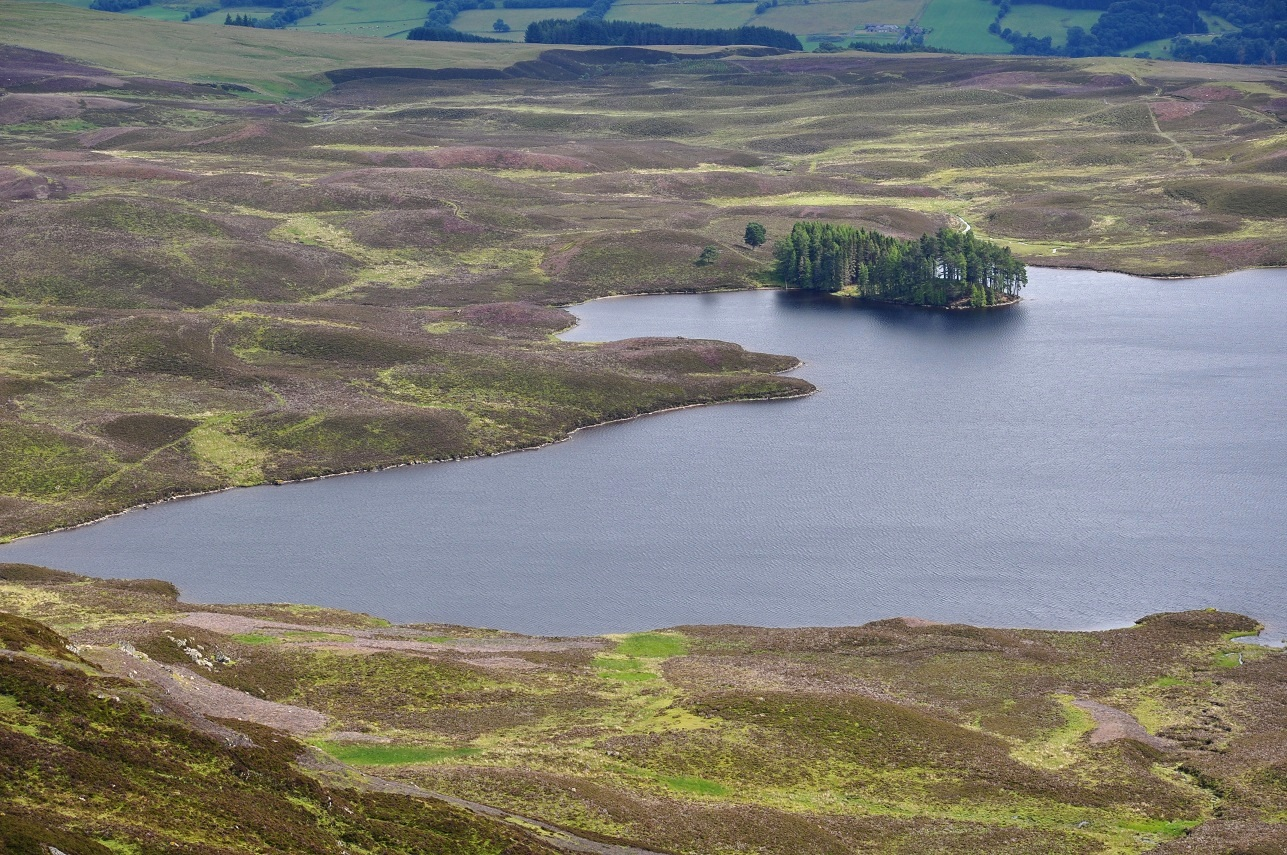
Loch Derculich in Perthshire

Loch, as a name for a body of water, is Insular Celtic in origin and is applied to most lakes and many sea inlets in Scotland.

Many of the loughs in Northern England have also previously been called "meres" (a Northern English dialect word for "lake", and an archaic Standard English word meaning "a lake that is broad in relation to its depth"), similar to the Dutch meer, such as the Black Lough in Northumberland.

Some lochs in Southern Scotland have a Brythonic, rather than Goidelic, etymology, such as Loch Ryan, where the Gaelic loch has replaced a Cumbric equivalent of Welsh llwch. The same is, perhaps, the case for bodies of water in Northern England named with 'Low' or 'Lough', or else represents a borrowing of the Brythonic word into the Northumbrian dialect of Old English.

== Scottish lakes ==
Scotland has very few bodies of water called lakes. The Lake of Menteith, an Anglicisation of the Scots Laich o Menteith meaning a "low-lying bit of land in Menteith", is applied to the loch there because of the similarity of the sounds of the words laich and lake. Until the 19th century the body of water was known as the Loch of Menteith. The Lake of the Hirsel, Pressmennan Lake, Lake Louise and Raith Lake are man-made bodies of water in Scotland, referred to as lakes.

== Lochs outside Scotland and Ireland ==
As "loch" is a common Gaelic word, it is found as the root of several Manx place names.

The United States naval port of Pearl Harbor, on the south coast of the main Hawaiian island of Oʻahu, is part of a complex of sea inlets. It contains three subareas called 'lochs' named East, Middle, and West or Kaihuopala‘ai, Wai‘awa, and Komoawa.

Loch Raven Reservoir is a reservoir in Baltimore County, Maryland.

Brenton Loch in the Falkland Islands is a sea loch, near Lafonia, East Falkland.

In the Scottish settlement of Glengarry County in present-day Eastern Ontario, there is a lake called Loch Garry. Loch Garry was named by those who settled in the area, Clan MacDonell of Glengarry, after the well-known loch their clan is from, Loch Garry in Scotland. Similarly, lakes named Loch Broom, Big Loch, Greendale Loch, and Loch Lomond can be found in Nova Scotia, along with Loch Leven in Newfoundland, and Loch Leven in Saskatchewan.

Loch Fyne is a fjord in Greenland named by Douglas Clavering in 1823.

== See also ==
- List of lochs of Scotland
- List of loughs of Ireland
- List of loughs of England
- Ria
- Lake-burst
