= Loch Lomond (disambiguation) =

Loch Lomond may refer to:

== Places ==
Australia

- Loch Lomond, Queensland, a locality in the Southern Downs Region

Canada

- Loch Lomond, a region in Saint John, New Brunswick
- Loch Lomond (Cape Breton), Nova Scotia
- Loch Lomond, Cape Breton Island, Nova Scotia
- Loch Lomond (Algoma District), a lake, Ontario
- Loch Lomond (Thunder Bay District), a lake near the city of Thunder Bay, Ontario
- Loch Lomond, Newfoundland and Labrador, a settlement

Scotland

- Loch Lomond in Scotland

United States

- Loch Lomond (California), a lake in Santa Cruz County
- Loch Lomond, California, a small town in Lake County
- Loch Lomond, Florida, a neighborhood of Pompano Beach
- Loch Lomond, Virginia, a census-designated place

== Music ==
- "The Bonnie Banks o' Loch Lomond", a Scottish poem and folk song sometimes referred to as "Loch Lomond"
- Loch Lomond (band), a band from Portland, Oregon, USA

== Others ==
- HMS Loch Lomond (K437), frigate of the British Royal Navy
- Loch Lomond Stadial, another name for the Younger Dryas ice age
- The Loch Lomond distillery in Alexandria, Scotland, near Loch Lomond
- Loch Lomond, a fictitious Scotch whisky brand in The Adventures of Tintin
