= Goodwater, Saskatchewan =

Village in Saskatchewan, Canada

Goodwater
- Village
- Village of Goodwater
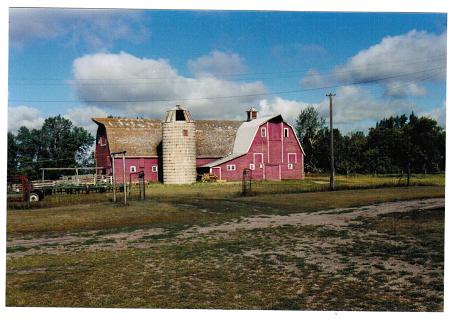
- Historic William J. White's barn, near Goodwater

- Location of Goodwater in Saskatchewan Goodwater (Canada)
- Coordinates: 49.391°N 103.889°W
- Country: Canada
- Province: Saskatchewan
- Region: Southeast
- Census division: 2
- Rural municipality: Lomond No. 37

Government
  - Type: Municipal
  - Governing body: Goodwater Village Council
  - Mayor: Greg Collins
  - Administrator: Kevin Melle
  - MP: Robert Kitchen
  - MLA: Dan D'Autremont

Area
  - Total: 0.59 km^{2} (0.23 sq mi)

Population (2021)
  - Total: 40
  - Density: 71.1/km^{2} (184/sq mi)
- Time zone: UTC-6 (CST)
- Postal code: S4H 2K1
- Area code: 306
- Highways: Highway 705
- Railways: None

Goodwater (2016 population: 30) is a village in the Canadian province of Saskatchewan within the Rural Municipality of Lomond No. 37 and Census Division No. 2. The village is located approximately 50 kilometres (31 mi) south of the city of Weyburn.

== History ==
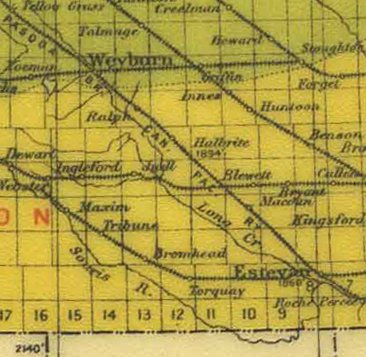
Detail from Canada Department of Mines map of Saskatchewan, reproduced c. 1914

Goodwater incorporated as a village on May 8, 1911. Goodwater's first village council was held on August 7, 1911. In 2011, Goodwater celebrated its 100-year anniversary from July 22–24 with a three-day event that included singing, two pancake breakfasts, an antique machinery show, and a performance by the BAD Boys.

=== Name ===
According to several sources, Goodwater was once called "Juell", prior to the arrival of the Canadian Northern Railway Company, c. 1909–1911. Families named Juell were among the first homesteaders in the area c. 1902, immigrating from Norway by way of the United States. The creek south of town is known as Juell Creek. Citing research undertaken using the database of Canadian federal ridings since 1867, the genealogical website project Saskatchewan GenWeb states: "There were a few homesteaders living near here under the name "Juell": George L Juell, NE 16-5-13-W2; John Juell, Jr., NE 20-5-1-W2; Chris Ceverian Juell, NW 20-5-1-W2; Sigurd John K Juell, SE 20-5-1-W2; and, John Peter Ludwig Juell, SW 20-5-13-W2."

The Saskatchewan GenWeb project highlights a 1914 reproduction of a Canada Department of Mines map of Alberta, Saskatchewan, and Manitoba, which clearly shows a town "Juell" in the same general area as current-day Goodwater.

The Albert and Edith Lyons entry by "family members" in the 1980 community history, Prairie Gold, recounts the family's 1904 relocation from Boissevain, Manitoba: "The Lyons family sought greener pastures and migrated further west to Jewelltown, North West Territories, later known as Goodwater, Sask."

Like many Saskatchewan place names, the straightforward explanation of Goodwater's current-day name originates with Canadian Northern Railway surveyors. According to a collectively-researched 1968 publication on Saskatchewan place name origins, CNoR surveyors encountered difficulty in finding water while approaching Juell, but when they eventually did, "they struck it at 12 feet—good water and in abundance."

=== Early businesses ===
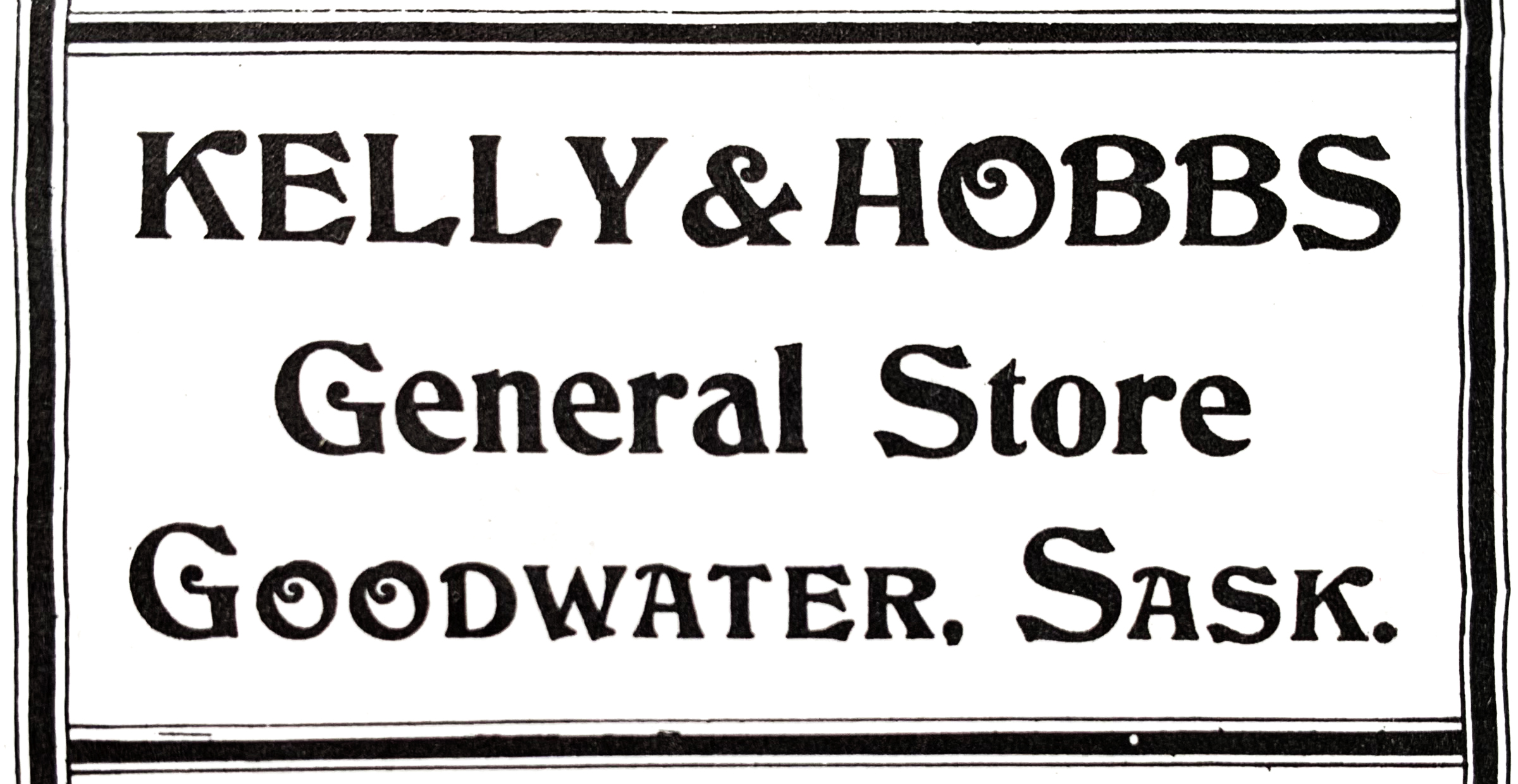
Advertisement for Kelly & Hobbs General Store, Goodwater, Saskatchewan (Undated)

The village was first surveyed in 1910, however several businesses already existed, including: Kelly and Hobbs general store (a tent); Ralph Graville's cafe; Mr. Pepper's blacksmith shop; and the Stirton and McIntyre hardware store. As early as 1914, a branch location of the Standard Bank of Canada existed in Goodwater; by 1936 the bank closed.

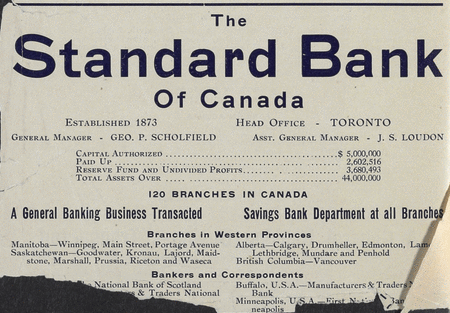
Advertisement for branch locations of The Standard Bank of Canada, taken from Henderson's Winnipeg City Directory, 1914 Edition, Page 1293

==== General store ====
Arthur Kelly (b. 1850, Devonshire, England) and William "Billie" Hobbs first established their general store in a tent in 1910, selling "everything from needles to threshing machines". In 1925, Arthur Kelly sold his interest in the general store to Billie Hobbs who, in 1933, sold the general store to Kelly's son, Arthur Kelly, Jr. Third-generation Clair Arthur Kelly took over the general store (and served as Postmaster), later selling it in 1953 to Norman Lucas who ran the store and served as Postmaster until 1960.

==== Stirton and McIntyre Hardware Store ====
The Stirton and McIntyre Hardware Store was begun in 1910 by US immigrant Edward McIntyre, Percy Speers, and Boissevain tinsmith Arthur Stinton. By 1912 Stirton and McIntyre handled farm insurance and loans, and dealt in farm implements for John Deere and the International Harvester Company. The hardware store closed in 1938, when Edward McIntyre left Goodwater with his family for British Columbia, during an economically difficult time in the Goodwater community.

=== Railway (1910–1979) ===
Established in 1899, the Canadian Northern Railway was formed out of the bankruptcy of the regional Lake Manitoba Railway and Canal Company—a local 27-kilometre "branch line" between Winnipegosis and Lake Manitoba (and, later, Portage La Prairie) in Manitoba. Donald Mann and William Mackenzie, both former employees of the Canadian Pacific Railway (CPR), purchased the defunct LMR&CC and rebranded it as the Canadian Northern Railway (CNoR) with the vision to compete with the CPR by consolidating and constructing alternative "branch lines" serving communities outside the CPR's transcontinental lines.

By 1911, the CNoR was reported to be constructing 300 miles of new rail lines in Saskatchewan, employing 500 teams and 2,500 men. Construction for a new branch line from Luxton to Ceylon, serving Colgate and Goodwater along the way, was authorized in 1908. This branch line was initially begun in 1909 from the main CNoR line at Maryfield, Saskatchewan, just west of the Manitoba border, and is sometimes referred to as the "Maryfield Extension". According to train historian Adam Peltenburg, the CNoR rail line branch through Goodwater was part of, "major developments in the prairies" that began around 1910. In 1911, the trade publication, Daily Consular and Trade Reports, wrote that, "one of the most important of the new lines now under construction in that province is the Maryfield extension, to be carried through the coal fields to Lethbridge, Alberta". Several community accounts report that surveyors of the CNoR were responsible for renaming the town from "Juell" to "Goodwater," c. 1910–1011.

The 89-mile branch line from Luxton to Ceylon was officially completed and opened for traffic on July 11, 1911.

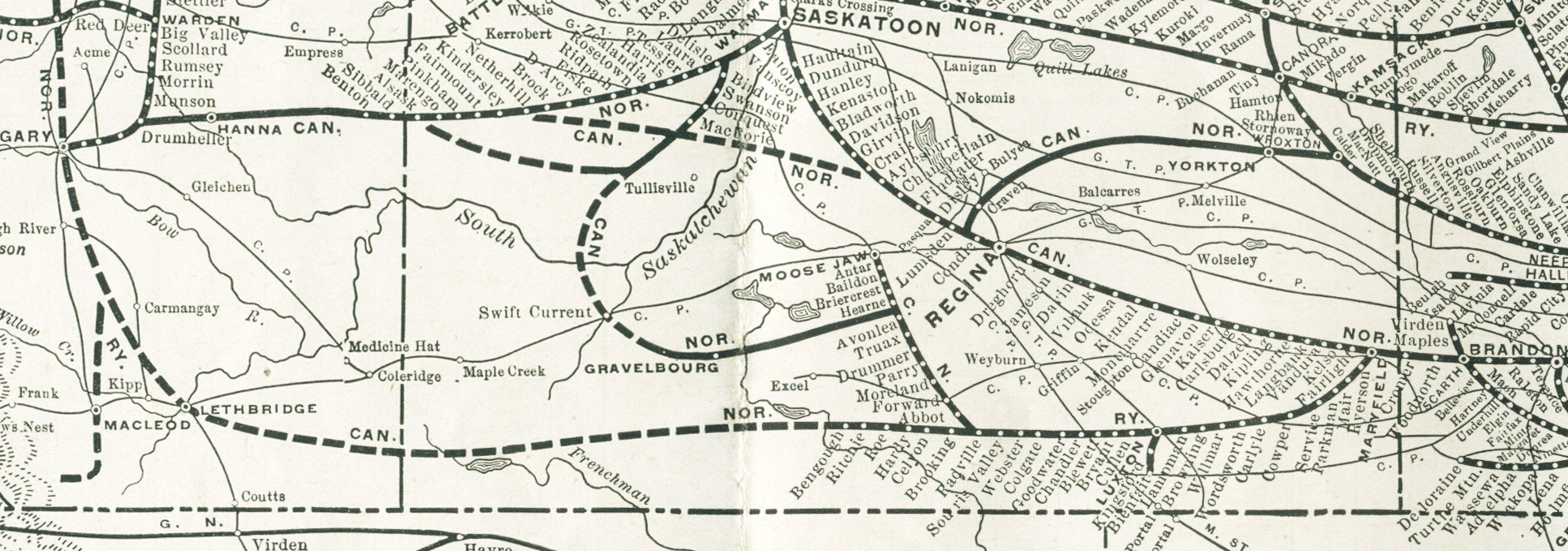
Southern Saskatchewan Detail from Canadian Northern Railway Schedule System Map, June 14, 1913

The Luxton to Ceylon branch line through Goodwater was reportedly a "busy line" with numerous trains daily, including passenger trains in both directions running six days a week (except Sunday) from 1914 to 1921. In one published community history anecdote, CNoR train engineer Dalrymple made the Carlyle-to-Radville segment in "a record time of a little over two hours...[making all the stops]," during which his "trainmen on the back of the caboose nervously held on to the "air" and in chorus, uttered a prayer on the Goodwater hill."

The Canadian Northern Railway was absorbed into other railway interests of the Canadian federal government on September 6, 1918, when mounting debt and the realities of profit-lean World War I caused Donald Mann and William Mackenzie to resign as CNoR directors.

Severe winter blizzard weather and snow accumulation during the winter of 1946–47 caused over sixteen days of isolation with no train service or supplies to Goodwater, as well as many other southern Saskatchewan towns. In January, 1947, the Canadian Press reported that "five feet of hard-packed snow covered tracks and some drifts were estimated to be 28 feet high" in Goodwater. On January 22, then-general store merchant, and future Goodwater Postmaster, Clair Archibald Kelly stated that the shortage of coal would be "serious" if Goodwater were forced to wait another day for supplies. The only road open in southern Saskatchewan was the road between Regina and Yorkton, and no trains passed through Goodwater from January 11 until January 24.

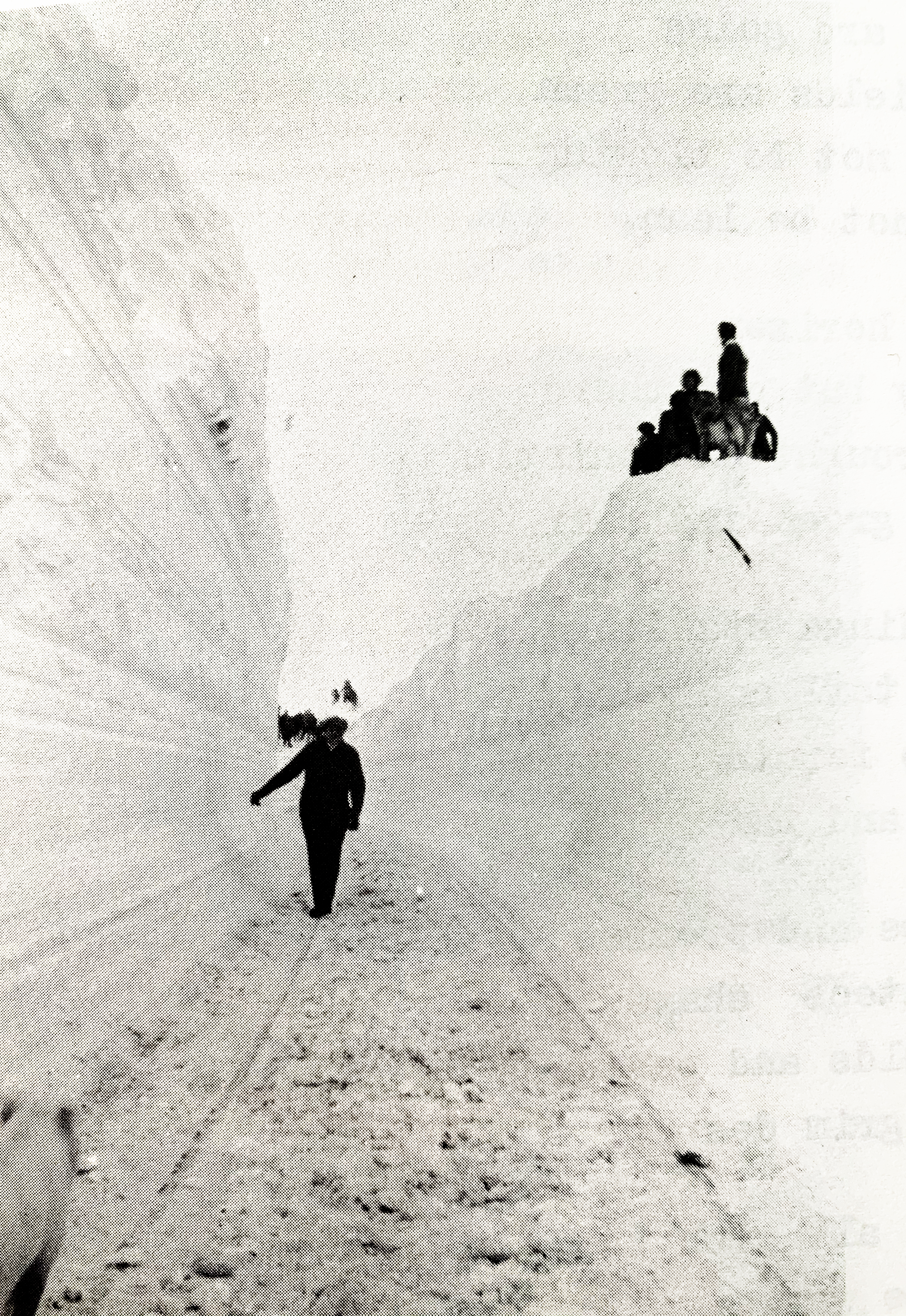
"Snowbank that stopped the train all winter, east of Goodwater", 1947. Uncredited photo, from Prairie gold: R.M. of Lomond #37 (1st ed.). Goodwater, Sask.: Lomond Historical Society. 1980. ISBN 0-88925-182-7. OCLC 15901992, page 445

During the spring of 1948, flood waters damaged the rail lines between Goodwater and Blewett. According to company records, the Canadian National Railway wrote off a 22.39 mile abandonment during 1948-1952 for the flood-damaged track between Goodwater and Blewett. With the closure of the Goodwater to Blewett section, trains ran only from Radville and Goodwater, then turned back to Radville. Into the 1950s, passenger service declined further and by 1959 regular train service ceased, with train service occurring only for grain cars as needed.

In 1976, local communities including Goodwater filed petition briefs to the Hall Commission on Grain Handling and Transportation, demanding "retention and protection of the rail lines and the rural elevator system". Canadian National Railway ultimately decided to abandon the Radville to Goodwater line, and on December 13, 1979, the final train left Goodwater.

=== Post office ===
George William Thackeray operated the Thacker Post Office located at Sec. 35, Twp. 5, R. 14, W2 as early as December 1907. This post office closed on November 27, 1911. Thackeray hauled mail from Halbrite, Saskatchewan.

The Goodwater Post Office opened in 1911 and closed in 1985.

=== "Hot and Dirty Thirties" ===
The period of the Great Depression significantly impacted the Goodwater community. According to community historian Thelma Ror, in 1936 the bank closed—"quite a blow to the area at the time," and the "hot and dirty thirties...were years of struggle for the town council; taxes were not paid, money had to be borrowed to keep the school operating, and many that were in dire need were given relief vouchers." Significant heat and drought severely affected the agricultural community, along with grasshoppers. Verna Berg, niece of early area businessman Arthur Kelly (of Kelly & Hobbs General Store), writes of the 1930s: "As the soil dried up from lack of rain and the wind blew, we had dust storms so bad you couldn't see across the street. [...] Many people gave up trying to farm or just exist, so, loading up what belongings they could on a wagon, and tying a cow or two behind, they headed for greener pastures, usually Northern Sask. or east to Manitoba. Those that stayed behind and had cattle, took them to the hay fields in Southern Manitoba. The story goes that the cattle had been so used to eating Russian thistle that when they got good hay, they wouldn't eat it." By early 1938, it was reported that 30% of horses in the Goodwater area were "either sick, dying or dead of starvation," and an examination of horse corpses revealed that, "dirt, sand and sharp Russian thistle had been consumed by the animals, and internal organs were as delicate as "tissue paper,"." A petition signed by Goodwater farmers was submitted to the United Farmers of Canada, appealing to the provincial government to supply feed, oats, and hay to affected communities.

== Agricultural industry ==
From its origins, Goodwater has long been a community organized around agricultural grain and livestock production.

Crop yields in 1921 reported fall rye yielding 44 bushels per acre, with spring rye yielding between 20 and 30 bushels.

=== Saskatchewan Co-operative Elevator Company, Local No. 6 ===
By 1913, Goodwater had two grain elevators: the Johnson & Co. Ltd. elevator with an estimated capacity of 25,000 bushels, and the Saskatchewan Co-Operative Elevator Company elevator with an estimated capacity of 30,000 bushels. Goodwater was Local No. 6 of the Saskatchewan Co-operative Elevator Company, Limited, and its 1919 representative delegate was W. J. Pepper. By 1975, both grain elevators in Goodwater were owned by the Saskatchewan Wheat Pool; Elevator A had a capacity of 91,000 bushels and Elevator B had a capacity of 26,000 bushels.

=== Lomond 4-H Club ===
The Lomond Calf Club was organized in the fall of 1939 by Scotch-born Alexander J. (Sandy) McKenzie, and held its first "achievement day" at the outdoor ice rink in the summer of 1940. Writing in a 1923 issue of The Grain Grower's Guide for an article on raising fowl, Alexander J. (Sandy) McKenzie lamented, "Much has been done for the cow and her products in the way of markets. We have a market for dairy products in Saskatchewan as good as any in the Dominion, but what have we got for the hen? Twenty thousand pounds of beeves costs us $64 to market, while the same weight of hens costs us nearly $900."

== Geography ==
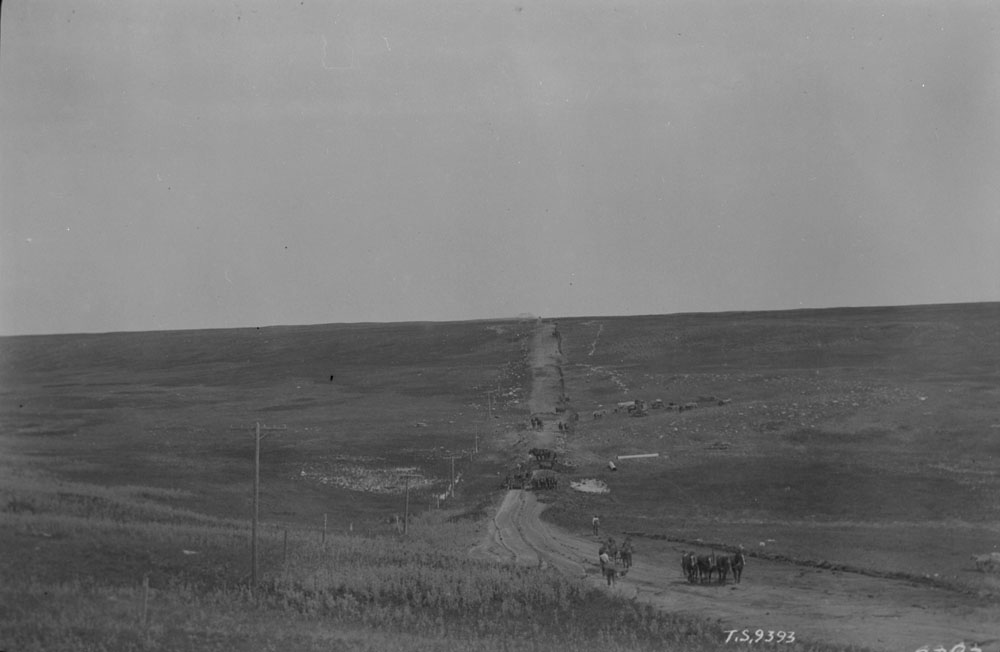
Grading a second class road, Sask. 4-12-2. [S.E. of Goodwater, Sask.] 1924. Photo by J. Hardouin. From Canadian Department of Mines and Technical Surveys, 1924. Library and Archives Canada Item # 3402731.

Located along the Souris River, the Goodwater community is located less than 10 km from Mainprize Regional Park and its Rafferty Dam Reservoir.

=== North-West Mounted Police 'March West' ===
Goodwater is situated along the route taken by George Arthur French, Commissioner of the North-West Mounted Police, during their ill-fated March West in 1874. After 22 days of travel from Fort Dufferin (present day Emerson, Manitoba), Major General French split his force of 300 mounted police on January 29, 1874, sending part of the force north to Fort Ellice, while carrying on westward himself and camping on January 30, 1874, at Long Creek (near present-day Estevan, Saskatchewan). Travelling at roughly 15 miles per day, along the Souris River through damp terrain heavy with mosquitoes and black flies, French's force passed the Goodwater area in the first days of August before reaching Moose Jaw on August 8, 1874. In this area on August 3, 1874, mountie Sub-Inspector John Henry McIllree and Commissioner French spotted and hunted prairie antelope, which are common to the Goodwater area.

== Demographics ==
Population history (1981–2016)
Year	Pop.	±%
1981	53	—
1986	42	−20.8%
1991	34	−19.0%
1996	29	−14.7%
2001	25	−13.8%
2006	25	+0.0%
2011	25	+0.0%
2016	30	+20.0%
2021	40	+33.3%
Source: Statistics Canada via Saskatchewan Bureau of Statistics

In the 2021 Census of Population conducted by Statistics Canada, Goodwater had a population of 40 living in 16 of its 17 total private dwellings, a change of 33.3% from its 2016 population of 30. With a land area of 0.56 km^{2} (0.22 sq mi), it had a population density of 71.4/km^{2} (185.0/sq mi) in 2021.

In the 2016 Census of Population, the Village of Goodwater recorded a population of 30 living in 13 of its 14 total private dwellings, a 16.7% change from its 2011 population of 25. With a land area of 0.59 km^{2} (0.23 sq mi), it had a population density of 50.8/km^{2} (131.7/sq mi) in 2016.

Goodwater reached its peak population, to-date, of 123 in 1921.

According to the 1926 Census of Prairie Provinces, the population of Goodwater was 104. [ By 1955 Goodwater had a population of 82.

== Goodwater hockey ==
According to local Thelma Ror, writing in 1980, "Residents of Goodwater and surrounding districts have always been sports-minded. A number of hockey teams and ball teams have provided recreation and entertainment through the years." Ice hockey games of shinny were played on Juell Creek as early as the 1910s. In 1952, the "Souris Valley League" was formed.

=== The Weyburn Farmers' Hockey League (1928–1937) and the Goodwater Eskimos ===
According to local historian Thelma Ror, the "Farmers League" for hockey was formed in 1928, and included teams from: Goodwater, Colgate, Talmage, Ralph, South Weyburn, and North Weyburn.

The "Maroons" from Ralph won the 1930–31 season championship, defeating a team from East Weyburn 2-0 in Game 3 of a three-game series. An all-star game in the Farmers' League was held in Weyburn on March 6, 1931.

The team from Ralph also won the 1933–34 championship, and a trophy donated by the Weyburn Rotary Club.

The 1934–35 season included teams from: Goodwater, Griffin, North Weyburn, South Weyburn, West Weyburn, and Ralph. In the 1934–35 season final, the Ralph "Indians" defeated the Goodwater "Eskimos" 5-0 to win the community of Ralph its fourth championship in as many years.

In 1936, the Regina Leader-Post documented the "Farmers' Hockey League" as having existed "several seasons as a six-team loop," including teams from: Goodwater, Colgate, Talmage, Ralph, South Weyburn, and McTaggart. Goodwater and Colgate did not field teams for the 1936–37 season.

No teams were fielded for the 1937–38 season of the Farmers' League due to "economic difficulties imposed by another year of drouth (sic)" in the region.

Long-serving Weyburn city clerk, John J. Norman, played in the Weyburn Farmers' League.

=== Merlin "Dutch" Evers (1915–1950) ===
Born April 11, 1915, Goodwater native Merlin Evers was a hockey talent in the 1930s and 1940s era, starting play in 1932 with the Goodwater team in the Farmers' League. Evers was a 5'8" tall winger, whose playing style (in his final season) was described as, "the best baldheaded back-checker in the loop...never been known to steer clear of bodily contact" who, "stays in the rough company with the big boys."

After several seasons with Goodwater in the early 1930s, Evers made the senior league Weyburn Beavers team in the 1936–37 season at the age of 21. Nicknamed "Dutch" like his father, Evers was reported as playing hockey in San Diego in the Pacific Coast Hockey League for the 1946–47 season. Evers played for the Seattle Ironmen in the 1948–49 season. By 1949, Evers was reported as still "sparkling" after three seasons with the New Westminster Royals in the Pacific Coast Hockey League and at the age of 34. On March 8, 1950, during intermission of a game against the Tacoma Rockets, the hometown New Westminster Royals honored Evers who was "leading the popular player poll in New Westminster." The Royals ultimately defeated the Los Angeles Monarchs in a closely fought seven-game series to win the 1949–50 Phil Henderson Cup (later known as the President's Cup, and the Lester Patrick Cup).

On October 16, 1950, while driving from Portland to Tacoma with three teammates from the Royals, Evers was involved in a car crash and sustained serious injuries to his head and internal organs. Evers died as a result of injuries sustained in the crash.

=== Goodwater Oil Kings ===
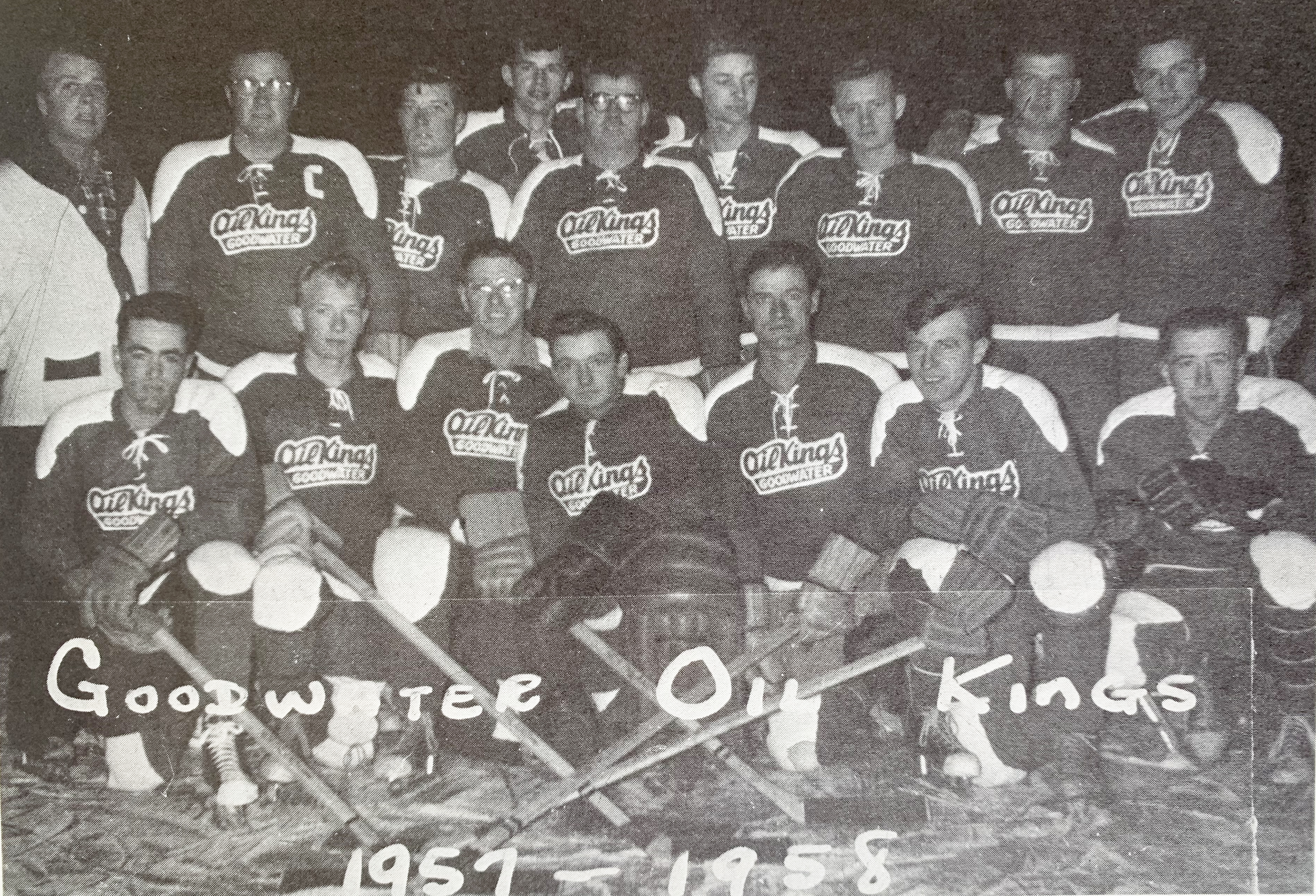
Goodwater Oil Kings, 1957–58 season. Photo from Prairie Gold: R.M. of Lomond #37.

Team photos of a Goodwater team named the "Oil Kings" date from as early as 1957. Gerald Alexander was captain of the Oil Kings for the 1957–58 season.

Beginning in the 1957–58 season, an Oil Kings team coached by Gord Cooke and managed by Walter Thackeray played in a league with teams from: Colgate, Bromhead, Midale, Torquay, Tribune, and Weyburn.

The Oil Kings coached by Gordon Cooke won the league title in the 1962–63 season.

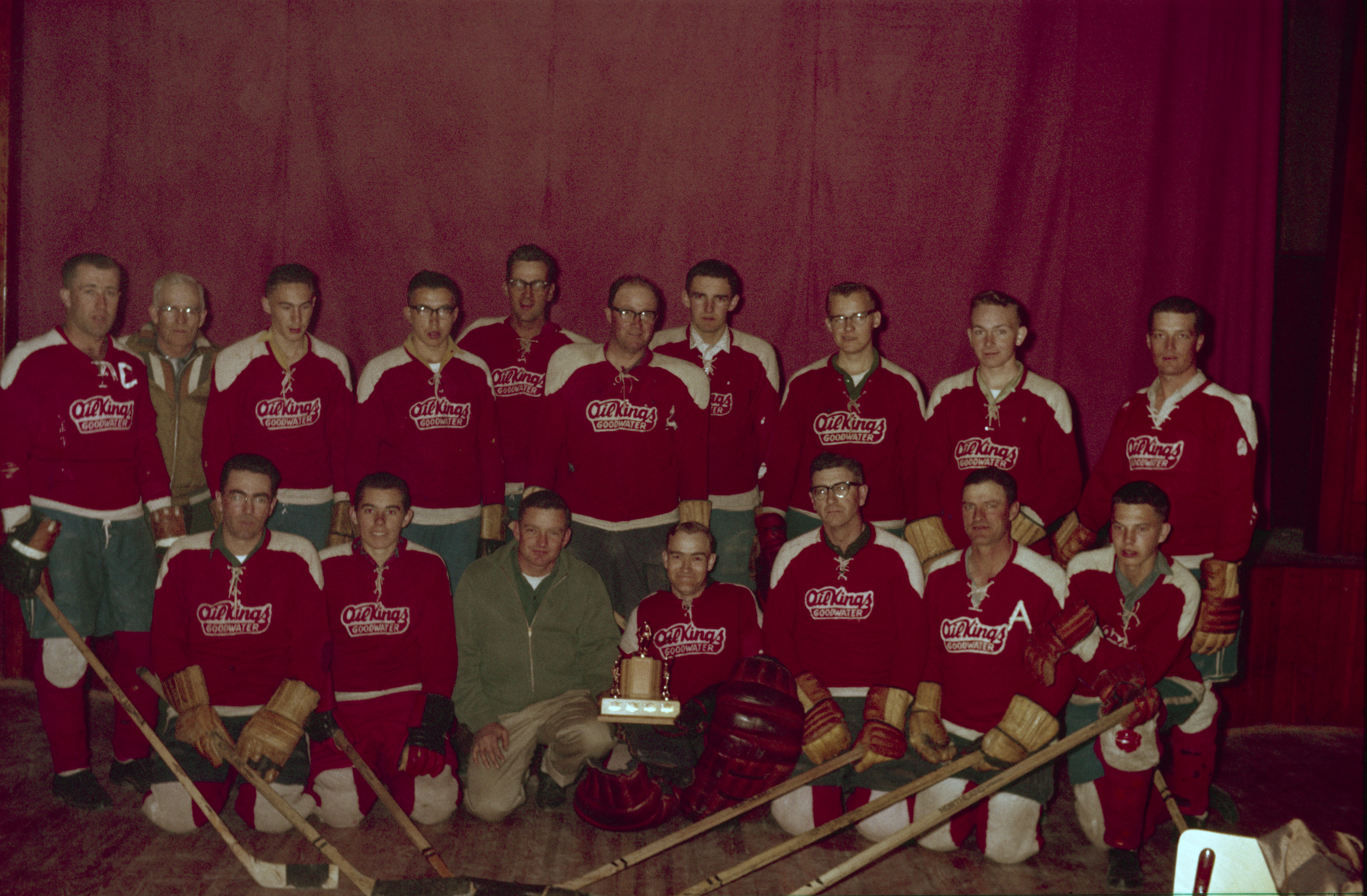
Goodwater Oil Kings,1962–63 Season Champs. Photograph copyright Walter Thackeray, 1962.

=== Goodwater Memorial Rink ===
In 1959, a new hockey rink was opened in Goodwater, facilitated by many of the Goodwater Oil Kings. On Saturday, February 7, 1959, Saskatchewan Premier Tommy C. Douglas "formally cut the ribbon to officially declare the rink open, and extend sincere congratulations to the people of Goodwater and district". Premier Douglas "told a banquet audience [of 400] in the community hall that people working in a group could do things they could not possibly do as individuals". Construction of the new rink took four days, and was built completely by a group of 65 volunteers with construction materiel costs estimated at more than $15,000. The new ice surface of 64 by 166 feet was to be the new home of the Goodwater Oil Kings, but not before an official opening performance of figure skating and an exhibition hockey game featuring all-stars from the Souris Valley Hockey League.

Film footage by Walter Thackeray of the community effort to build a hockey rink in Goodwater, Saskatchewan, Canada in 1958.

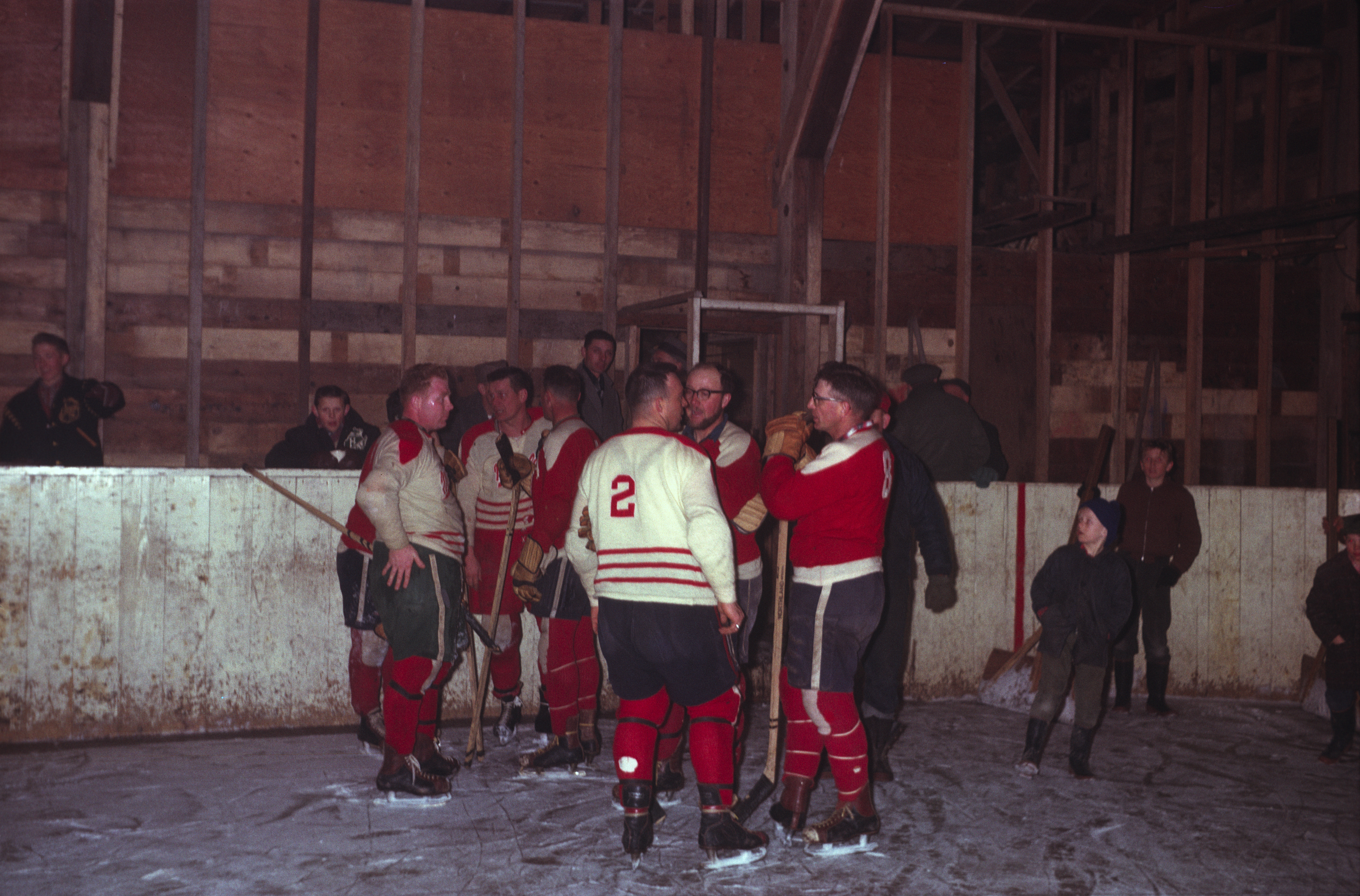
Interior of Goodwater Memorial Rink. Photograph copyright Walter Thackeray, 1962. Goodwater Oil King #8 Don Alexander in foreground, Goodwater Oil King Gerald Alexander (in glasses) in mid-ground, and Goodwater Oil King Captain Max White in background (red jersey, back turned).

On Saturday, January 14, 1961, Premier Tommy C. Douglas returned to the Goodwater Memorial rink, and “took great pleasure in putting a match to the Memorial rink promissory note indicating the rink built only two years ago, was now free from debt.” Congratulating the building fund committee, Douglas stated that, "there are certain things, such as the building of rinks, schools, churches and roads that could not be done by individuals, but by communities as a whole. Over the years the Goodwater community has been a leader in this regard".

== Notable people ==
- James Auburn Pepper — Farmer and progressive NDP politician

== See also ==
- List of communities in Saskatchewan
- List of villages in Saskatchewan
