= Loch Lomond, Nova Scotia =

Community in Nova Scotia, Canada

Coordinates: 45°45′56.83″N 60°34′2.53″W

Loch Lomond in Nova Scotia

Loch Lomond (Scottish Gaelic: Loch Laomainn) is a community in the Canadian province of Nova Scotia, located in Richmond County. It is named after Loch Lomond in Dunbartonshire, Scotland.

The community of Loch Lomond sits upon the eastern shore of a lake which is also named Loch Lomond, and south of Lake Uist. Both of these are fresh water lakes that are used for fishing and boating. It also has a rich history kept alive by the community.

== History ==
The first settlers of Loch Lomond were Philip and Sandy Chisholm in the summer of 1826. Local history states that the two settlers were guided in a birch bark canoe by “Black John,” who guided the family over many lakes and rivers and proclaimed Loch Lomond, “the best lake for fishing.” Many of the early settlers were pioneers who settled the area in 1828 from the islands of Harris and Northern Uist Scotland. A cairn was erected in 1923 by the side of the road commemorating them.

Some of settlers moved to St. Anns, near Baddeck.

In the 1900s, a general store, post office, and school serviced the area. Due to the dwindling population, most services were closed by the 21st century, but the area remains a popular spot for summer homes. The area is predominantly dirt roads that can be hazardous and prone to flooding.

In 1838 the first Presbyterian church was built in the community. In 1910, it was replaced with the Calvin Presbyterian Church, which continues to host services as of 2019. In 1926, a smaller United Church was built in the community; this church was destroyed by a fire of unknown origin in 2016. In 2022, a cairn was erected on the site of the United Church.
