= Lake of the Hirsel =

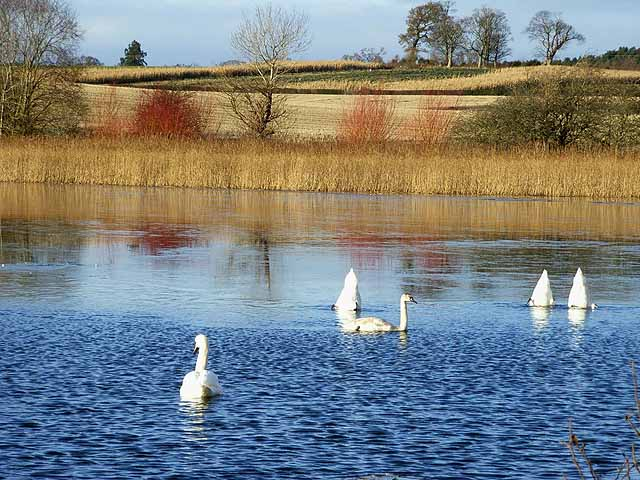

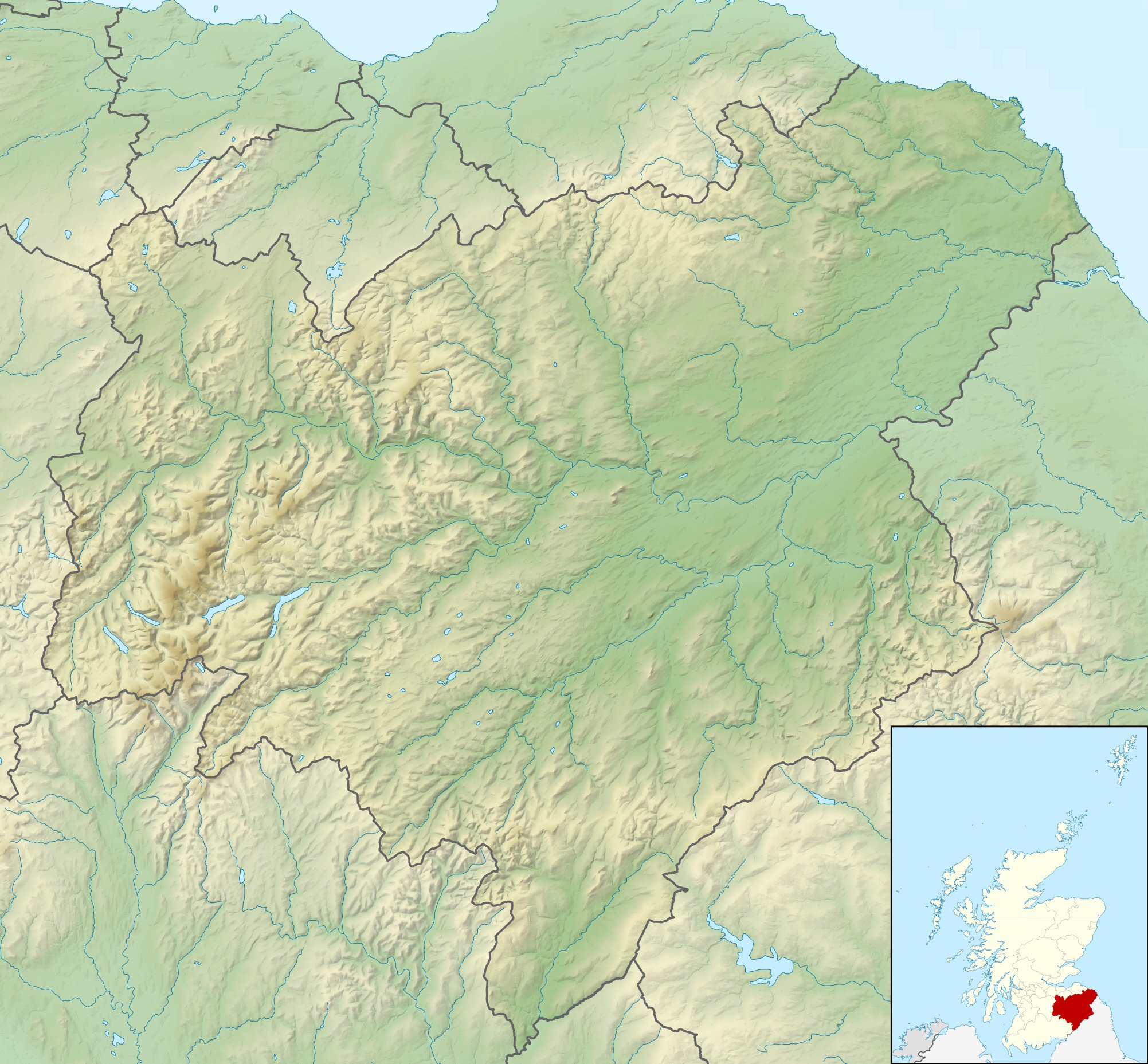
- Location within Scottish Borders
- Location: Scottish Borders, Scotland
- Coordinates: 55°39′28″N 2°16′41″W
- Type: reservoir
- Basin countries: United Kingdom
- Surface area: 27 acres (11 ha)

The Lake of the Hirsel or Hirsel Lake is an artificial body of water and Site of Special Scientific Interest near Coldstream in Berwickshire in Scotland. It is set in the grounds of The Hirsel, home of the Home family and of the late Alec Douglas-Home, former British prime minister.

It covers around 27 acres (110,000 m^{2}). It is roughly square shaped, around 300–400 metres in breadth.

It is one of only a few bodies of water in Scotland to be known as a lake; the others being the Lake of Menteith, Pressmennan Lake, Lake Louise (within the grounds of Skibo Castle) and Cally Lake (near Gatehouse of Fleet). There is also a sea bay near Kirkcudbright known as Manxmans Lake. All other major bodies of water in Scotland are known as lochs.
