= Loch Derculich =

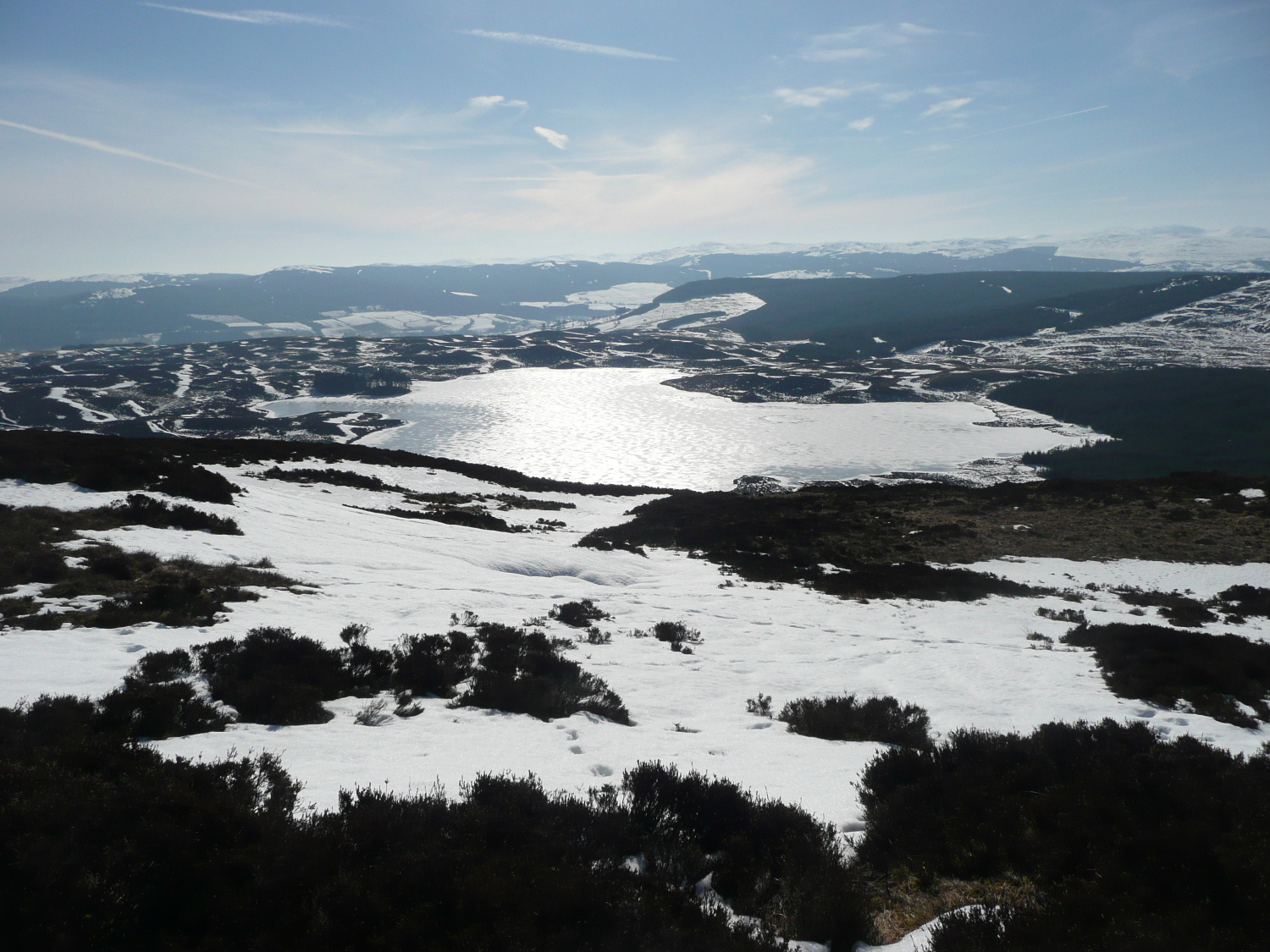
- Frozen Loch Derculich

- Location within Perth and Kinross
- Coordinates: 56.6727°N 3.8545°W
- Type: freshwater loch
- River sources: Derculich Burn
- Max. length: 0.804 km (0.500 mi)
- Max. width: 0.402 km (0.250 mi)
- Surface area: 39.9 ha (99 acres)
- Average depth: 25 ft (7.6 m)
- Max. depth: 70 ft (21 m)
- Water volume: 108,333,000 ft^{3} (3,067,600 m^{3})
- Shore length^{1}: 3.3 km (2.1 mi)
- Surface elevation: 367 m (1,204 ft)
- Max. temperature: 55 °F (13 °C)
- Min. temperature: 47 °F (8 °C)
- Settlements: Aberfeldy
- ^{1} Shore length is not a well-defined measure.

Loch Derculich is a freshwater loch in central highlands of Scotland, in Perth and Kinross. Loch Tummel is located three miles to the north. 4.5 miles east-northeast is the town of Pitlochry.

== Habitation ==
Evidence of Shieling huts in two groups are visible from oblique aerial photography, that consist of two groups in either side of a gully on the South of Loch Derculich. A trackway runs to the SW of the huts. What may be a hut-circle lies beside a more modern track to the north-east of the huts.

== Gallery ==
Looking over Loch Derculich to the east boathouse The east boathouse is on the tree-clad peninsula. There is also a west, less picturesque, boathouse.

Southern slopes of Beinn Eagagach. The frozen Loch Derculich is prominent with Strath Tay beyond.

Easter slopes of Farragon Hill with Loch Derculich in the distance
