= Rural Municipality of Lomond No. 37 =

Rural municipality in Saskatchewan, Canada

Lomond No. 37
- Rural municipality
- Rural Municipality of Lomond No. 37
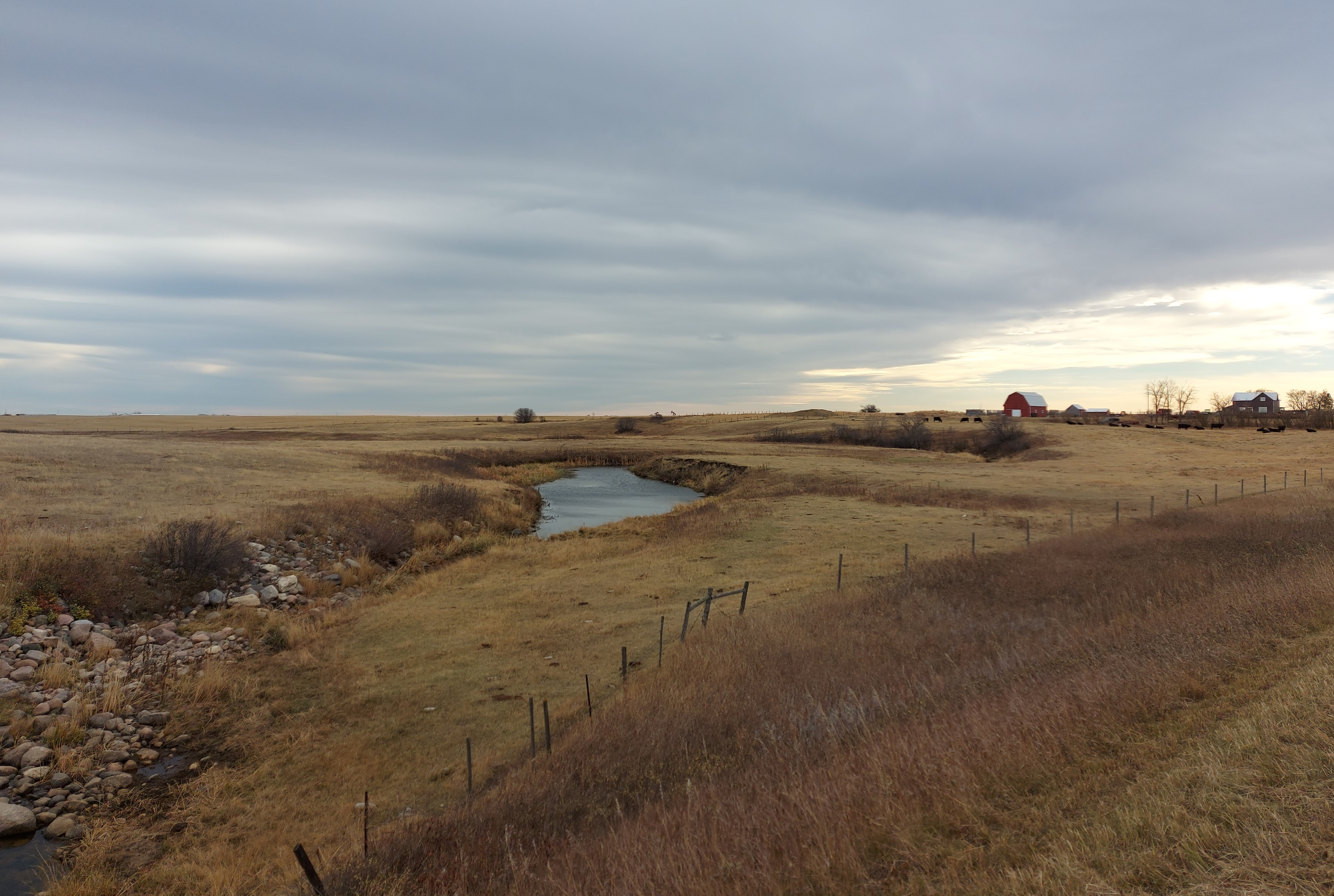
- Roughbark Creek in the RM of Lomond

- Location of the RM of Lomond No. 37 in Saskatchewan
- Coordinates: 49.419°N 103.811°W
- Country: Canada
- Province: Saskatchewan
- Census division: 2
- SARM division: 1
- Federal riding: Souris—Moose Mountain
- Provincial riding: Estevan
- Formed: December 11, 1911

Government
  - Reeve: Desmond McKenzie
  - Governing body: RM of Lomond No. 37 Council
  - Administrator: Aleshia Underwood
  - Office location: Weyburn

Area (2016)
  - Land: 833.95 km^{2} (321.99 sq mi)

Population (2016)
  - Total: 296
  - Density: 0.4/km^{2} (1.0/sq mi)
- Time zone: CST
  - Summer (DST): CST
- Postal code: S4H 2K1
- Area codes: 306 and 639

The Rural Municipality of Lomond No. 37 (2016 population: 296) is a rural municipality (RM) in the Canadian province of Saskatchewan within Census Division No. 2 and SARM Division No. 1. Located in the southeast portion of the province, it is south of the city of Weyburn.

== History ==
The RM of Lomond No. 37 incorporated as a rural municipality on December 11, 1911.

== Geography ==
Long Creek, Roughbark Creek, and Jewell Creek all flow through the RM, eventually emptying into the Souris River.

=== Communities and localities ===
The following urban municipalities are surrounded by the RM.

Villages

- Colgate
- Goodwater

The following unincorporated communities are within the RM.

Localities

- Maxim

== Demographics ==
Population history (1981–2016)
Year	Pop.	±%
1981	493	—
1986	477	−3.2%
1991	436	−8.6%
1996	381	−12.6%
2001	365	−4.2%
2006	301	−17.5%
2011	304	+1.0%
2016	296	−2.6%
Source: Statistics Canada via Saskatchewan Bureau of Statistics

In the 2021 Census of Population conducted by Statistics Canada, the RM of Lomond No. 37 had a population of 275 living in 111 of its 121 total private dwellings, a change of −7.1% from its 2016 population of 296. With a land area of 825.6 km^{2} (318.8 sq mi), it had a population density of 0.3/km^{2} (0.9/sq mi) in 2021.

In the 2016 Census of Population, the RM of Lomond No. 37 recorded a population of 296 living in 113 of its 121 total private dwellings, a −2.6% change from its 2011 population of 304. With a land area of 833.95 km^{2} (321.99 sq mi), it had a population density of 0.4/km^{2} (0.9/sq mi) in 2016.

== Economy ==
Its two principal industries are agriculture and petroleum production.

== Government ==
The RM of Lomond No. 37 is governed by an elected municipal council and an appointed administrator that meets on the first Thursday of every month. The reeve of the RM is Desmond McKenzie while its administrator is Aleshia Underwood. The RM's office is located in Goodwater.

== Gallery ==
A photo gallery of places in the RM of Lomond No. 37

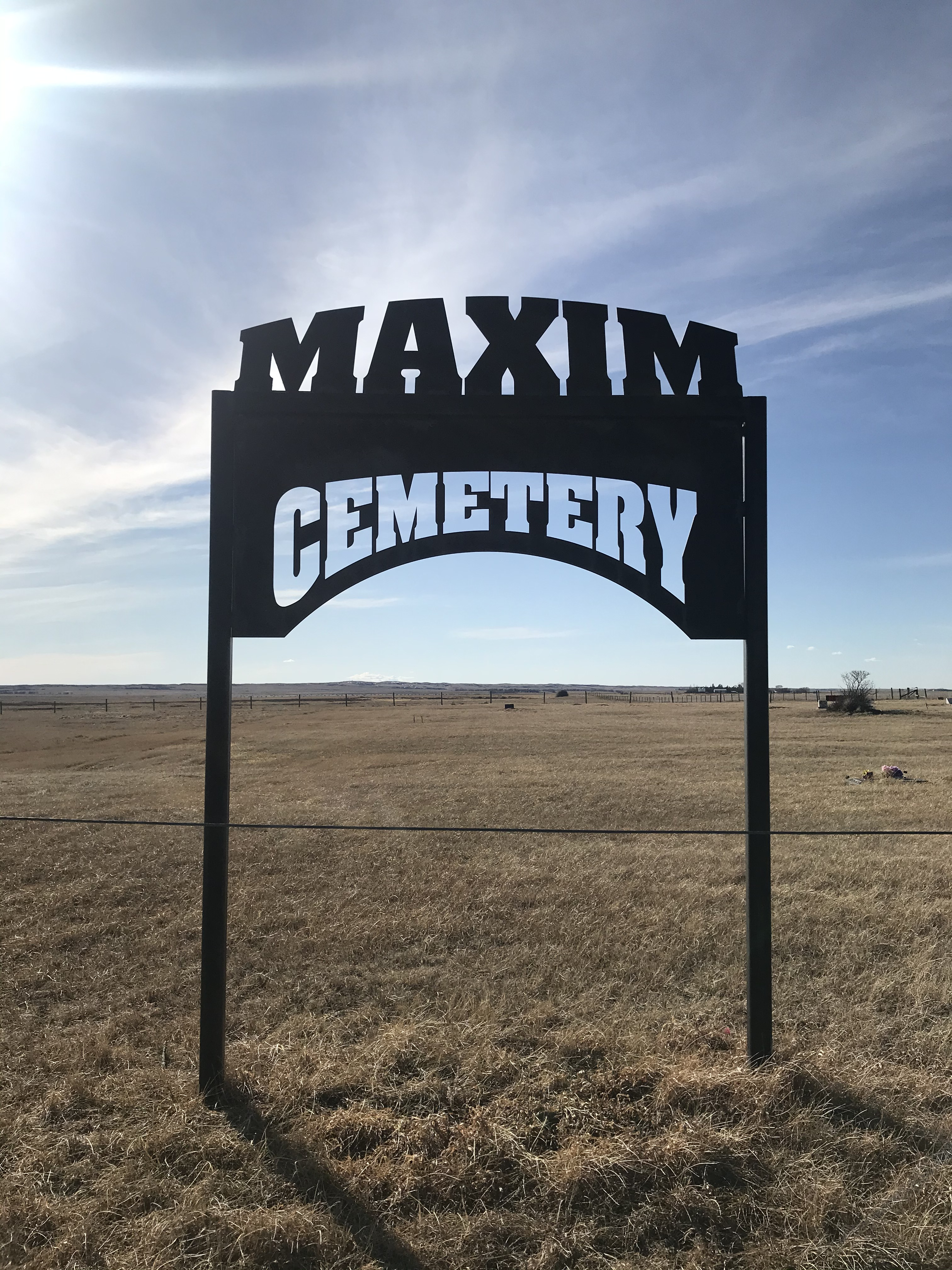
The cemetery in Maxim, Saskatchewan in the Rural Municipality of Lomond No. 37

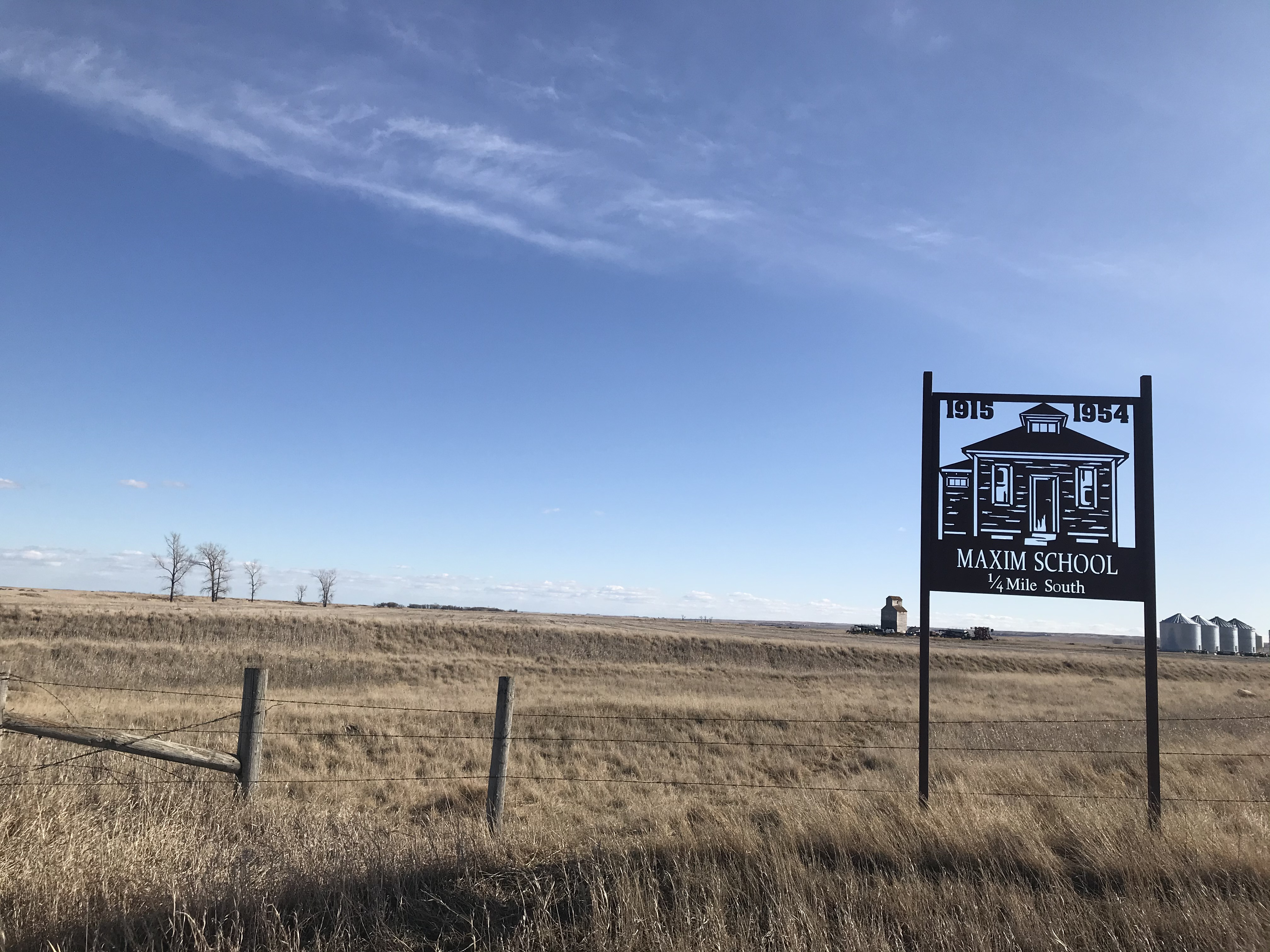
The location of the former school in Maxim, Saskatchewan in the Rural Municipality of Lomond No. 37

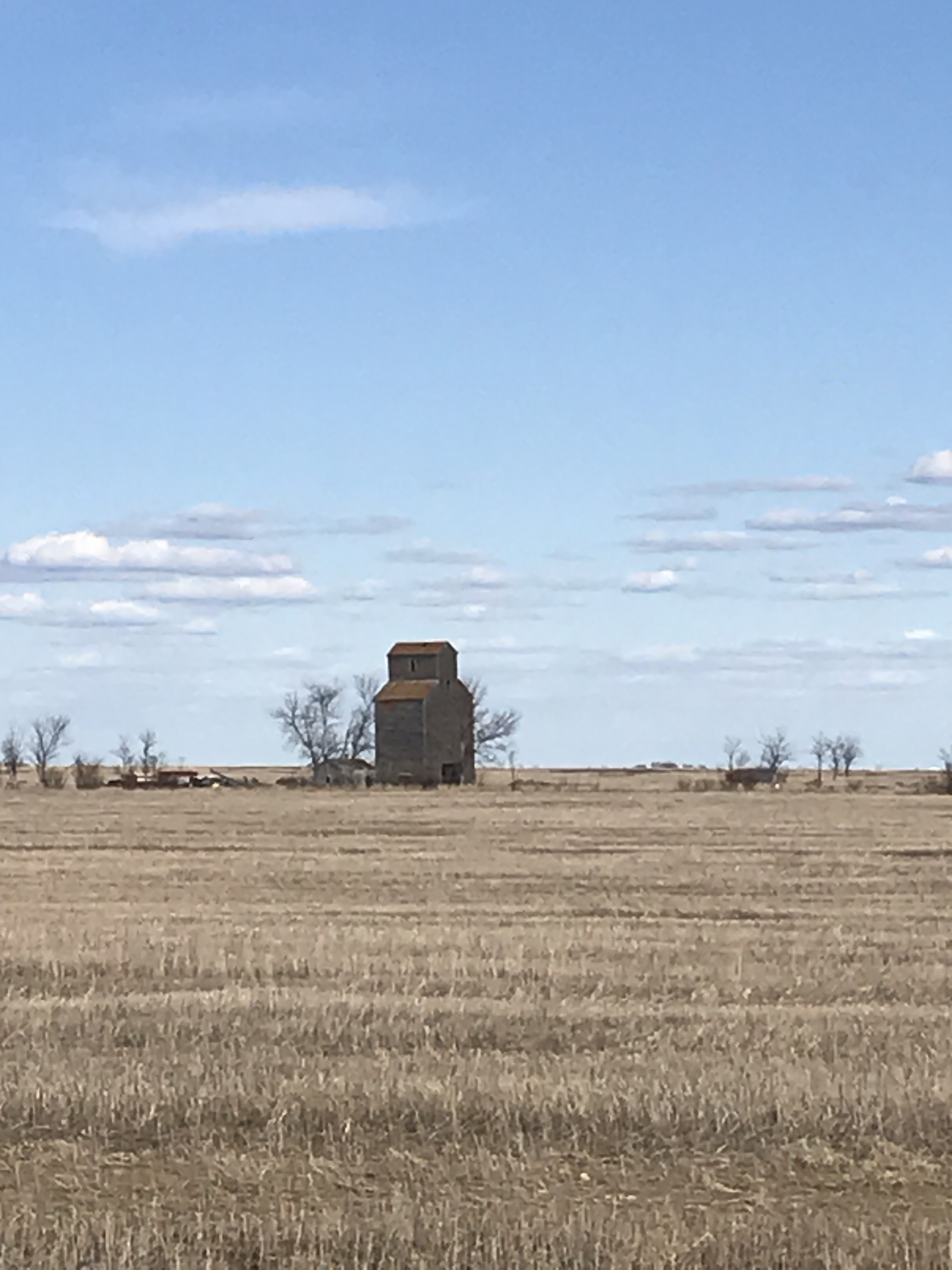
The grain elevator in Maxim, Saskatchewan in the Rural Municipality of Lomond No. 37
