= Pressmennan Lake =

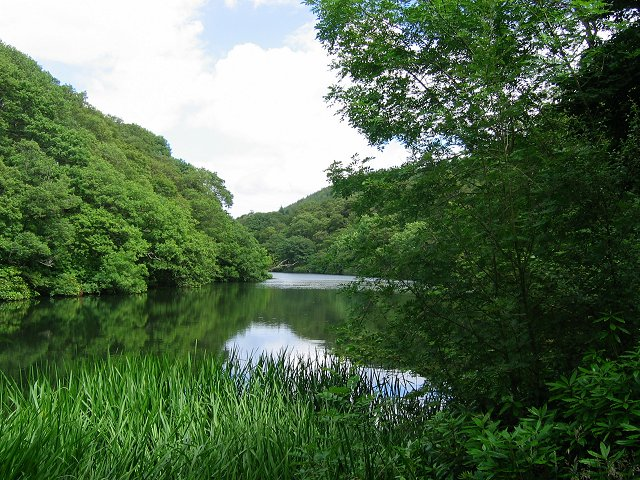
- View east along the lake

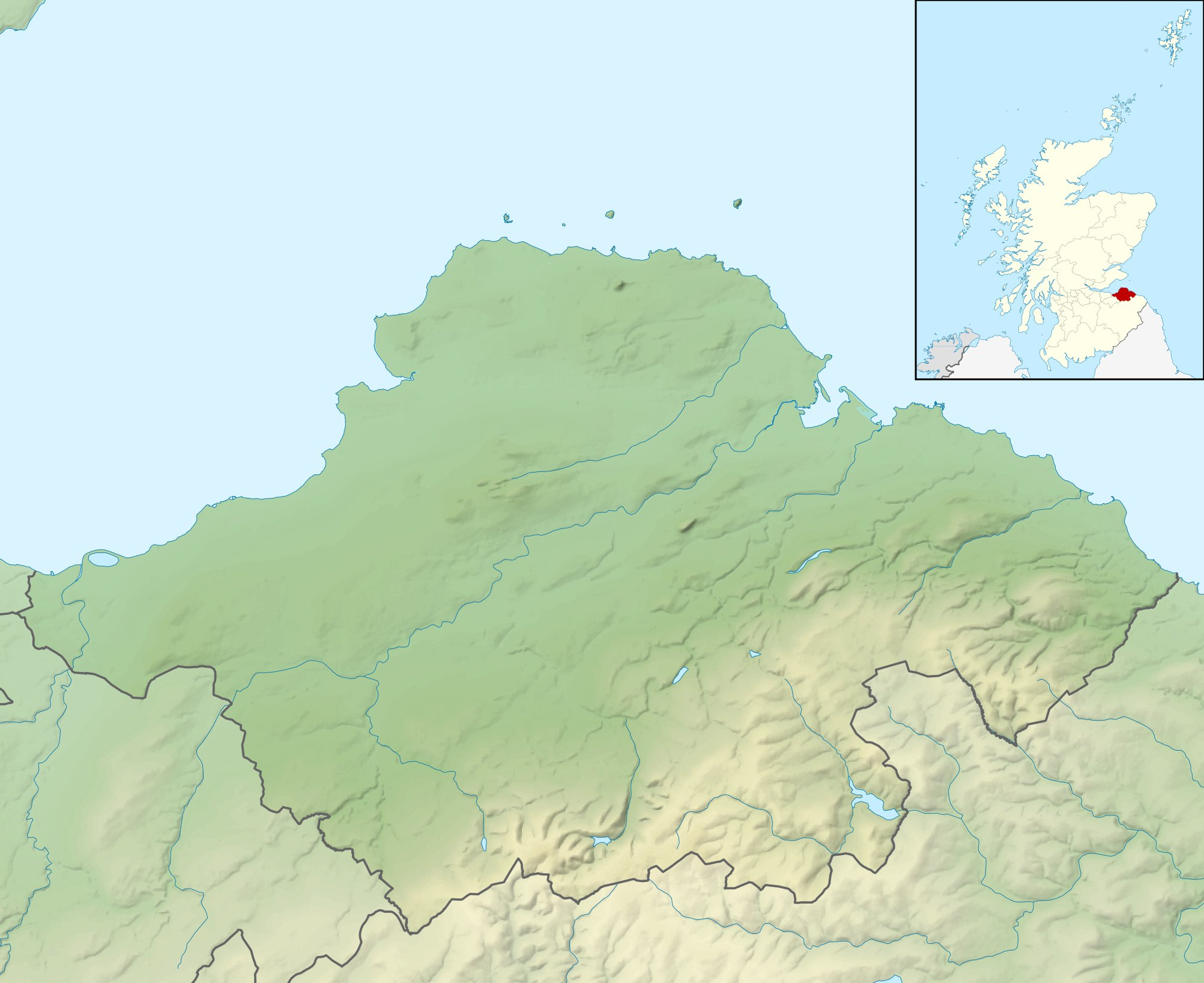
- Location within East Lothian
- Location: East Lothian, Scotland
- Coordinates: 55°57′0″N 2°35′50″W
- Type: reservoir
- Basin countries: United Kingdom
- Max. length: 2 km (1.2 mi)
- Max. width: 100 m (330 ft)

Pressmennan Lake is a lake in East Lothian in Scotland.

It is an artificial reservoir constructed in 1819 by a Mr Nesbit who dammed the streams flowing into the gully, it was said to be well stocked with carp, perch and trout. It lies in a gully in the Lammermuir Hills, above the village of Stenton in East Lothian. It is roughly 2 kilometres (1.2 mi) in length but less than 100 metres (330 ft) broad.

It is one of only a few bodies of water in Scotland known as lakes; the others include the Lake of Menteith and the Lake of the Hirsel, only the Lake of Menteith is a natural body of water.

The woodland in the surrounding valley was cut down in 1623 by a servant of Isobel Hepburn, Lady Bass, mother of the owner George Hepburn. The Privy Council halted the felling, arguing that the woods were home to deer for the king's sport. The woods on the southern shore of the lake have been owned by the Woodland Trust since 1988. The Woodland Trust Reserve covers an area of 86 hectares (210 acres) around 1.5 kilometres (0.93 miles) south of the village of Stenton on the northern slopes of Deuchrie Dod, one of the Lammermuir Hills. The mixed woodland in the reserve is said to contain some of the last remnants of the ancient woodland which clothed much of Scotland before it was cleared.

The lake and woods are home to a variety of wildlife including deer, otters and bats. The woods are one of the few places in East Lothian where common redstart nests and in 2006 were host to the first record of Iberian chiffchaff in Scotland.
