= Colgate, Saskatchewan =

Hamlet in Saskatchewan, Canada

Coordinates: 49.396°N 103.894°W

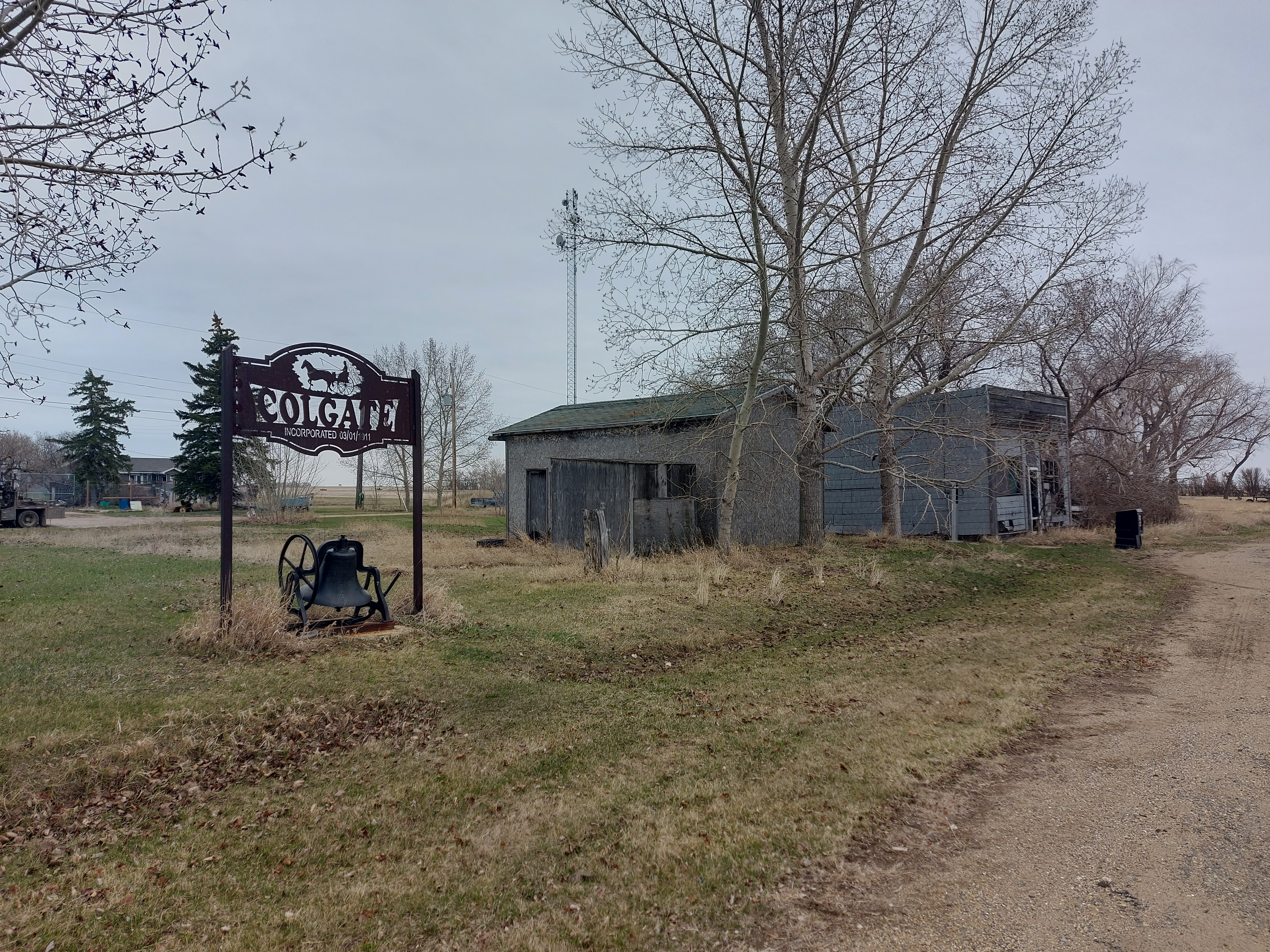
Main Street, Colgate

Colgate is a hamlet in the Rural Municipality of Lomond No. 37, Saskatchewan, Canada. The community had a population of 34 in 2017. It previously held the status of village until May 16, 2000. The hamlet is located 34 kilometres (21 mi) south of the city of Weyburn and 4 kilometres (2.5 mi) west of Highway 35.

== Demographics ==
Prior to November 4, 2000, Colgate was incorporated as a village, and was restructured as a hamlet under the jurisdiction of the RM of Lomond No. 37 on that date.

Canada census – Colgate, Saskatchewan community profile

Population
Land area
Population density
Median age
Private dwellings
Median household income

== Colgate IBA ==
The community of Colgate sits at the north-east corner of the Colgate (SK 013) Important Bird Area (IBA) of Canada. It is a protected area for birds totalling 116.42 km^{2} (44.95 sq mi). The site consists of native grasslands, Neptune Lake, and rivers in the Souris River watershed, such as Jewel Creek and Long Creek. Birds important to the area include the ferruginous hawk and burrowing owl. The grasslands are partially protected by the RM of Lomond's Prairie Farm Rehabilitation Administration (PFRA) and are classified as a Wildlife Management Unit.

== See also ==
- List of communities in Saskatchewan
- List of hamlets in Saskatchewan
