= Lake Lomond =

Lake in the state of Minnesota, United States

- Location within Minnesota
- Location: Clearwater County, Minnesota
- Coordinates: 47°31′48″N 95°24′26″W
- Type: lake

Lake Lomond is a lake in Clearwater County, Minnesota, in the United States.

Lake Lomond was named after Loch Lomond, in Scotland.

== See also ==
- List of lakes in Minnesota
