= Loch Lomond (Cape Breton) =

Lake in Nova Scotia, Canada

- Location within Nova Scotia
- Location: Richmond County, Nova Scotia
- Coordinates: 45°44′46.9″N 60°35′22.9″W
- Basin countries: Canada

Loch Lomond is a lake of Richmond County, in north-eastern Nova Scotia, Canada.

== See also ==
- List of lakes in Nova Scotia
