= Saskatchewan Highway 44 =

Provincial highway in Saskatchewan, Canada

Highway 44
- Highway 44 highlighted in red
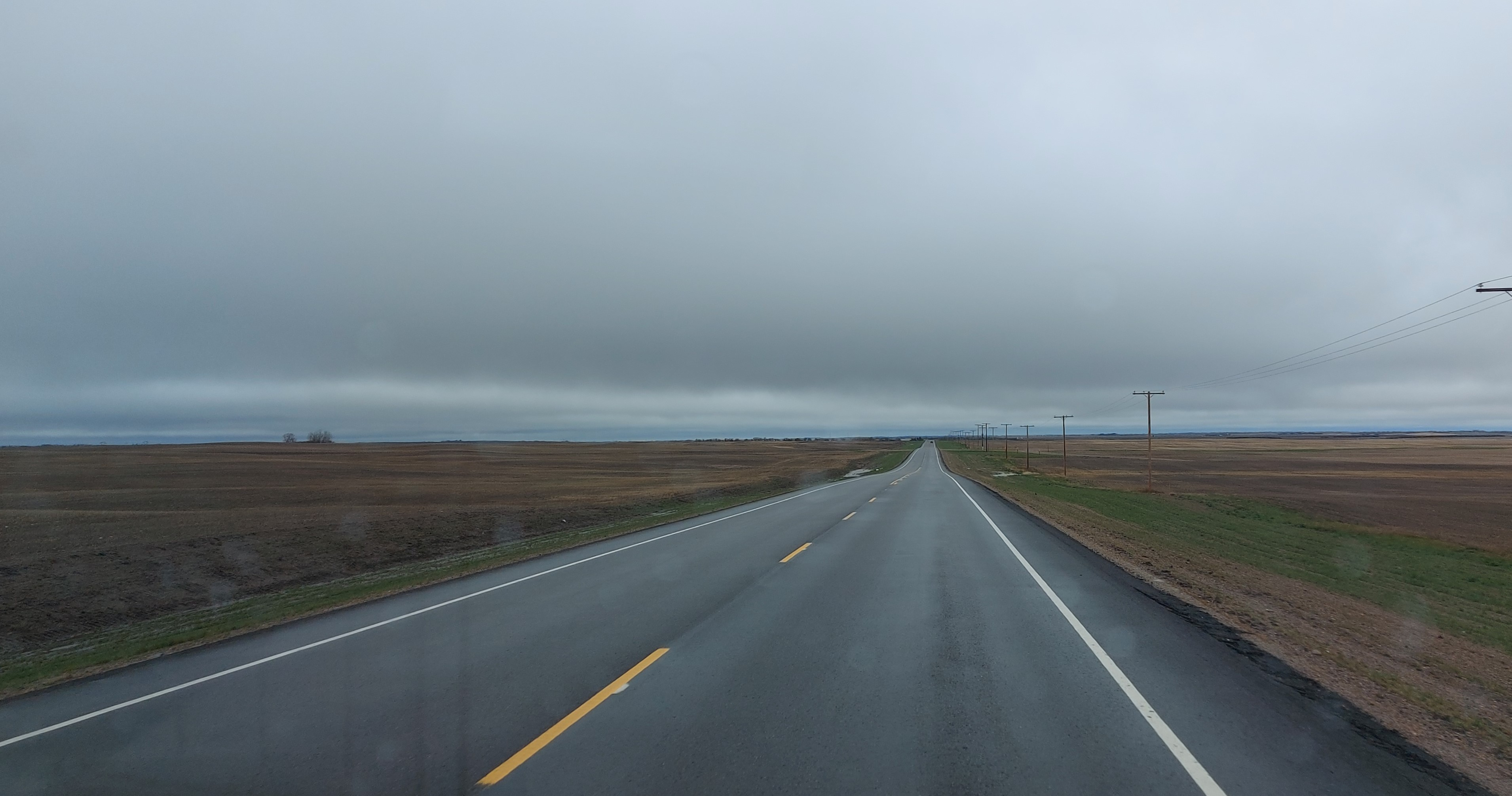
- Highway 44 near Macrorie

Route information
- Maintained by Ministry of Highways and Infrastructure
- Length: 329.0 km (204.4 mi)

Major junctions
- West end: Highway 7 near Alsask
- Highway 21 at Eatonia; Highway 30 at Eston; Highway 4 near Elrose; Highway 42 near Dinsmore; Highway 45 at Macrorie; Highway 219 near Cutbank; Highway 19 near Loreburn
- East end: Highway 11 at Davidson

Location
- Country: Canada
- Province: Saskatchewan
- Rural municipalities: Milton, Chesterfield, Newcombe, Snipe Lake, Monet, Milden, Fertile Valley, Coteau, Loreburn, Willner, Arm River

Highway system
- Provincial highways in Saskatchewan
← Highway 43	→ Highway 45

Highway 44 is a provincial highway in the Canadian province of Saskatchewan. It runs from Highway 7 near Alsask to Highway 11 near Davidson. It crosses the South Saskatchewan River atop the Gardiner Dam and provides access to Danielson Provincial Park. The highway is about 329 kilometres (204 mi) long.

== Route description ==
Highway 44 begins in the Rural Municipality of Milton No. 292 at the junction with Highway 7 on the north side of Alsask, just 1.2 kilometres (0.75 mi) east of the Alberta border. It heads south as a paved, two-lane highway along the eastern side of town, passing by the former CFD Alsask and crossing a railway. Leaving Alsask, the highway continues south running parallel to the provincial border for a few kilometres before curving sharply to the east at the junction with Alberta Highway 570. Now crossing into the Rural Municipality of Chesterfield No. 261, where it traverses some slightly hilly terrain for a few kilometres, passing by the remains of Eyre before travelling through Mantario. Highway 44 winds its southeast through a series of switchbacks through farmland to pass through Laporte, having an intersection with Highway 635 before joining a concurrency (overlap) with northbound Highway 21 to enter Eatonia. The pair pass by the Eatonia (Elvie Smith) Municipal Airport before crossing a railway line and making a sudden sharp right turn onto Railway Avenue and travelling through the southern side of town. Leaving Eatonia, the highway goes through another switchback to enter the Rural Municipality of Newcombe No. 260, having an intersection with Fairmount Road (Range Road 3245, provides access to the hamlet of Fairmount) before reaching the hamlet of Glidden, where Highway 21 splits of and heads north at the intersection with Highway 649. Highway 44 winds its way southeast for a few kilometres to travel along the north side of Madison, paralleling a railway line as it crosses into the Rural Municipality of Snipe Lake No. 259.

Highway 44 heads southeast through rural areas to pass through the hamlet of Snipe Lake, where it junctions with Highway 658, before curving due east to enter the town of Eston, crossing yet another railway line as it traverses a business district on the north side of town along Railway Avenue. It has an intersection with Highway 30 (2nd Street SE/NE) and makes two more railway crossings before leaving Eston, heading east through rural farmland for the next several kilometres, having intersections with Richlea Road (Range Road 3193, provides access to Richlea) and Isham Road (Range Road 3192, provides access to Isham) before travelling just to the south of Plato, where it has a junction with both Highway 342 and Range Road 3183. Crossing into the Rural Municipality of Monet No. 257, the highway heads northeast to Greenan, where it makes another railway crossing, then eastward through Wartime to have a short concurrency with Highway 4 on the north side of Elrose. Highway 44 now heads northeast again through rural areas to pass through Hughton and Forgan before becoming concurrent with Highway 664 and entering the Rural Municipality of Milden No. 286.

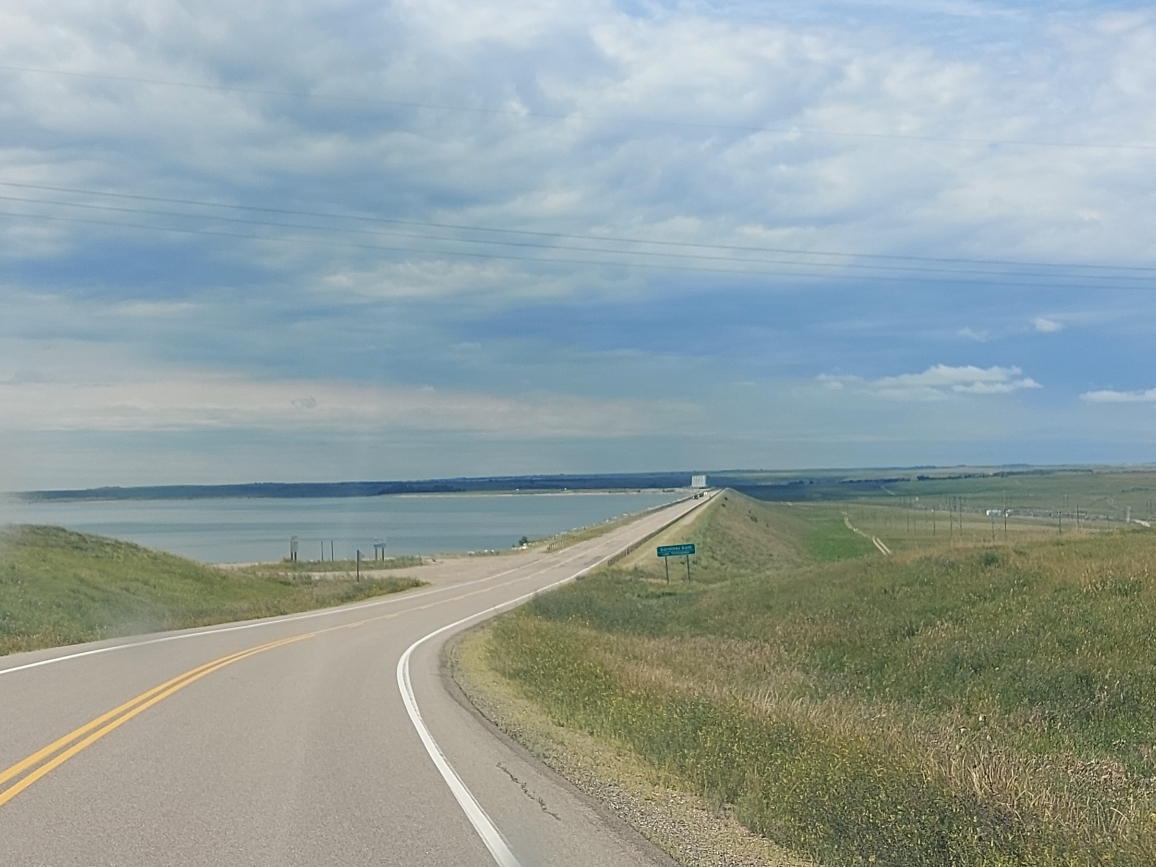
Highway 44 travelling over the Gardiner Dam

While travelling along the north side of Wiseton, Highway 664 splits off and heads south while Highway 44 heads northeast to have an intersection with Range Road 3123 (provides access to the town of Milden) on its way to Dinsmore, where it shares a concurrency with Highway 42 as they travel along the town's south side and have a railway crossing. Splitting off and heading east, Highway 44's pavement turns to gravel as it enters the Rural Municipality of Fertile Valley No. 285 and travels to the south of Anerley (access via Range Road 3102) before winding its way along the southern coastline of Stockwell Lake to the village of Macrorie, where it regains asphalt pavement and joins Highway 45 southbound in a concurrency. With Highway 45 splitting off just as the pair enter the northern fringes of the Rural Municipality of Coteau No. 255, Highway 44 heads east past the Sandy Shores Resort to cross the South Saskatchewan River / Lake Diefenbaker via the Gardiner Dam to enter the Rural Municipality of Loreburn No. 254. Passing by Cutbank via a sharp right, the highway makes another sharp right at the intersection with Highway 219 (Chief Whitecap Trail) and heads southeast along the shores of the lake to travel past Danielson Provincial Park before turning east through rural areas for several kilometres. It travels on the north side of the village of Loreburn, where it crosses a railway and has an intersection with Highway 19, before crossing travelling through the very rural areas of the Rural Municipality of Willner No. 253, where it has an intersection with McWilldale Road (Range Road 3030, provides access to Kenaston) before entering the Rural Municipality of Arm River No. 252. The highway almost immediately curves northward and enters the town of Davidson, crossing a railway and joining Railway Street as a four-lane divided highway as it travels along the south side of downtown. Now making a sharp right onto Internal Road, Highway 44 heads through neighbourhoods as a two-lane once again for a short distance before coming to an end at the junction between Highway 11 (Louis Riel Trail) and Highway 653.

== Major intersections ==
From west to east:

Rural municipality	Location	km	mi	Destinations	Notes
Milton No. 292	Alsask	0.0	0.0	Highway 7 – Calgary, Kindersley, Saskatoon	Western terminus; Alberta Highway 9 begins 1.2 km (0.75 mi) to the west
Chesterfield No. 261		13.0– 13.9	8.1– 8.6	Township Road 270 – Acadia Valley	To Alberta Highway 570 west
Chesterfield No. 261		14.6	9.1	Range Road 3293 – Empress, Estuary Ferry	
Chesterfield No. 261	Laporte	51.3	31.9	Highway 635 south	
Chesterfield No. 261	Eatonia	31.3	19.4	Highway 21 south – Leader	West end of Highway 21 concurrency
Newcombe No. 260		67.2	41.8	Fairmount Road (Range Road 3245) – Fairmount	
Newcombe No. 260	Glidden	78.6	48.8	Highway 21 north – Kindersley Highway 649 south – Lemsford Ferry, Lemsford	East end of Highway 21 concurrency
Snipe Lake No. 259	Snipe Lake	102.3	63.6	Highway 658 north – Netherhill	
Snipe Lake No. 259	Eston	112.4	69.8	Highway 30 – Brock	
Snipe Lake No. 259		123.8	76.9	Richlea Road (Range Road 3193) – Richlea	
Snipe Lake No. 259		125.4	77.9	Isham Road (Range Road 3192) – Isham	
Snipe Lake No. 259	Plato	133.5	83.0	Highway 342 south – Kyle	
Monet No. 257	Elrose	166.4	103.4	Highway 4 south – Swift Current	West end of Highway 4 concurrency
Monet No. 257		169.6	105.4	Highway 4 north – Rosetown, The Battlefords	East end of Highway 4 concurrency
Monet No. 257		191.1	118.7	Highway 664 north – Sovereign	West end of Highway 664 concurrency
Milden No. 286	Wiseton	198.3	123.2	Highway 664 south	East end of Highway 664 concurrency
Milden No. 286		200.3	124.5	Range Road 3123 – Milden	
Milden No. 286		209.9	130.4	Highway 42 west – Milden	West end of Highway 42 concurrency
Milden No. 286	Dinsmore	213.0	132.4	Highway 42 east – Lucky Lake	East end of Highway 42 concurrency; western end of unpaved section
Fertile Valley No. 285		221.3	137.5	Anerley Road (Range Road 3102) – Anerley	
Fertile Valley No. 285	Macrorie	241.3	149.9	Highway 45 north – Outlook	West end of Highway 45 concurrency; eastern end of unpaved section
Coteau No. 255		251.6	156.3	Highway 45 south – Birsay	East end of Highway 45 concurrency
Lake Diefenbaker		258.1– 258.3	160.4– 160.5	Gardiner Dam crosses the South Saskatchewan River	
Loreburn No. 254		263.7	163.9	Highway 219 north (Chief Whitecap Trail) – Saskatoon	West of Cutbank
Loreburn No. 254	Loreburn	283.6	176.2	Highway 19 – Highway 15, Elbow	
Willner No. 253		305.7	190.0	McWilldale Road (Range Road 3030) – Kenaston	
Arm River No. 252	Davidson	329.0	204.4	Highway 11 (Louis Riel Trail) – Saskatoon, Regina Highway 653 north / Highway 747 east – Imperial	Eastern terminus; continues as Highway 653
1.000 mi = 1.609 km; 1.000 km = 0.621 mi: Concurrency terminus

== See also ==
- Transportation in Saskatchewan
- Roads in Saskatchewan
