= Penkill =

- Unincorporated community
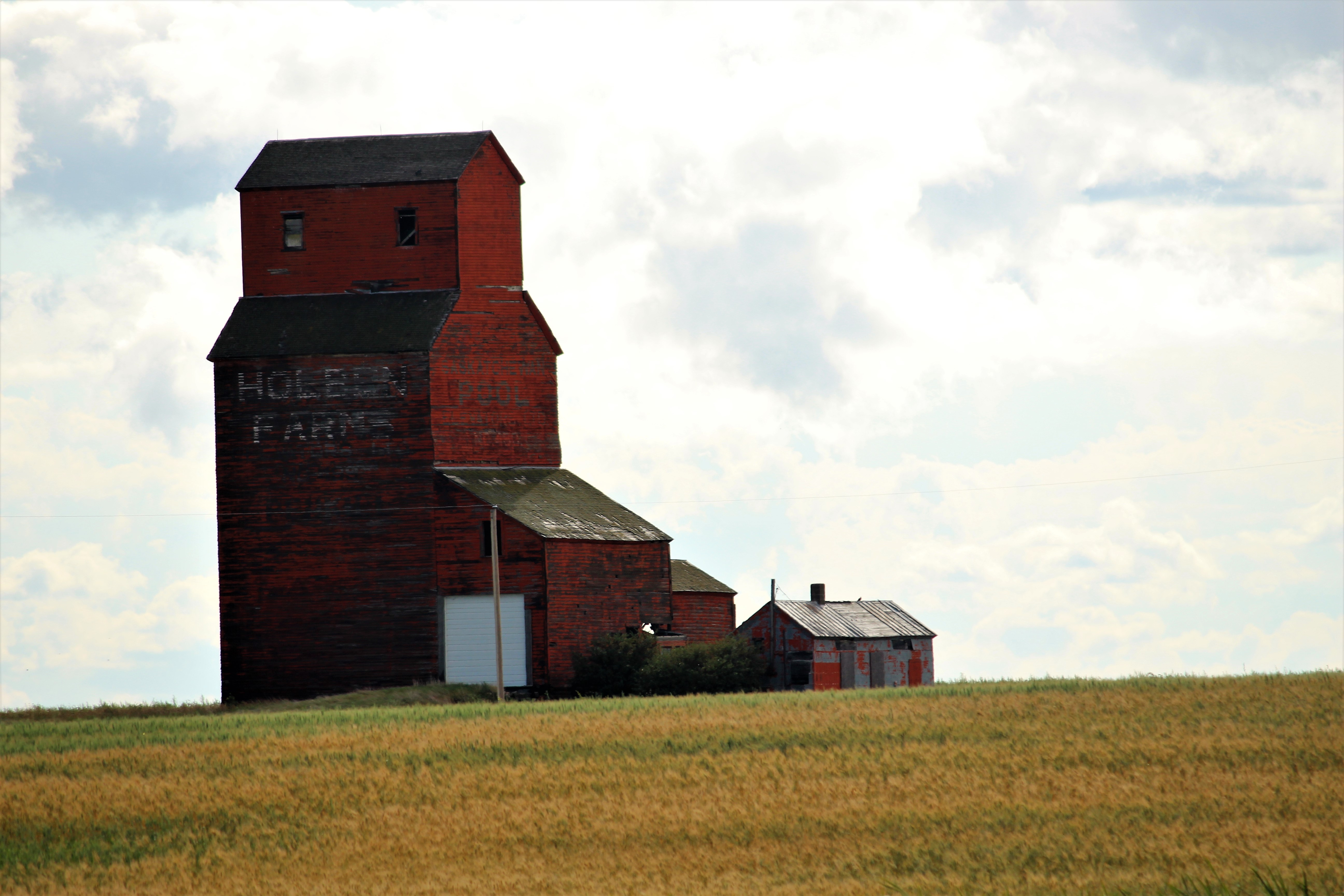
- The Former elevators in Penkill

- Location of Penkill in Saskatchewan Penkill (Canada)
- Coordinates: 51.314151°N 108.632238°W
- Country: Canada
- Province: Saskatchewan
- Region: West-Central
- Census division: 8
- Rural Municipality: Snipe Lake No. 259

Government
  - Type: Municipal
  - Governing body: Rural Municipality of Snipe Lake
- Time zone: UTC-6 (CST)
- Area code: 306
- Highways: Highway 30
- Railways: Gone

Penkill is an unincorporated hamlet within the Rural Municipality of Snipe Lake No. 259, Saskatchewan, Canada. The community is located (51.314151, -108.632238) approximately 20 km north of the town of Eston, 8 km east of Highway 30 and 4.81 km north of Highway 752 on Range Road 194. Very little remains of the former community, since the railway was pulled up. All that is left is a grain elevator, over grown streets and a couple houses.
