= Rural Municipality of Willner No. 253 =

Rural municipality in Saskatchewan, Canada

Willner No. 253
- Rural municipality
- Rural Municipality of Willner No. 253
- Location of the RM of Willner No. 253 in Saskatchewan
- Coordinates: 51.227°N 106.214°W
- Country: Canada
- Province: Saskatchewan
- Census division: 11
- SARM division: 5
- Formed: January 1, 1913

Government
  - Reeve: Len Palmer
  - Governing body: RM of Willner No. 253 Council
  - Administrator: Yvonne (Bonny) Goodsman
  - Office location: Davidson

Area (2016)
  - Land: 835.03 km^{2} (322.41 sq mi)

Population (2016)
  - Total: 255
  - Density: 0.3/km^{2} (0.78/sq mi)
- Time zone: CST
  - Summer (DST): CST
- Area codes: 306 and 639
- Website: Official website

The Rural Municipality of Willner No. 253 (2016 population: 255) is a rural municipality (RM) in the Canadian province of Saskatchewan within Census Division No. 11 and SARM Division No. 5. It is located in the south-central portion of the province.

== History ==
The RM of Willner No. 253 incorporated as a rural municipality on January 1, 1913.

== Geography ==
The RM is between the RMs of Arm River No. 252 and Loreburn No. 254.

== Demographics ==
Population history (1981–2016)
Year	Pop.	±%
1981	453	—
1986	439	−3.1%
1991	397	−9.6%
1996	316	−20.4%
2001	281	−11.1%
2006	254	−9.6%
2011	245	−3.5%
2016	255	+4.1%
Source: Statistics Canada via Saskatchewan Bureau of Statistics

In the 2021 Census of Population conducted by Statistics Canada, the RM of Willner No. 253 had a population of 293 living in 93 of its 108 total private dwellings, a change of 14.9% from its 2016 population of 255. With a land area of 836.21 km^{2} (322.86 sq mi), it had a population density of 0.4/km^{2} (0.9/sq mi) in 2021.

In the 2016 Census of Population, the RM of Willner No. 253 recorded a population of 255 living in 98 of its 102 total private dwellings, a 4.1% change from its 2011 population of 245. With a land area of 835.03 km^{2} (322.41 sq mi), it had a population density of 0.3/km^{2} (0.8/sq mi) in 2016.

== Government ==
The RM of Willner No. 253 is governed by an elected municipal council and an appointed administrator that meets on the second Thursday of every month. The reeve of the RM is Len Palmer while its administrator is Yvonne (Bonny) Goodsman. The RM's office is located in Davidson.

== See also ==
- List of rural municipalities in Saskatchewan
