= Saskatchewan Highway 30 =

Provincial highway in Saskatchewan, Canada

Highway 30
- Highway 30 highlighted in red
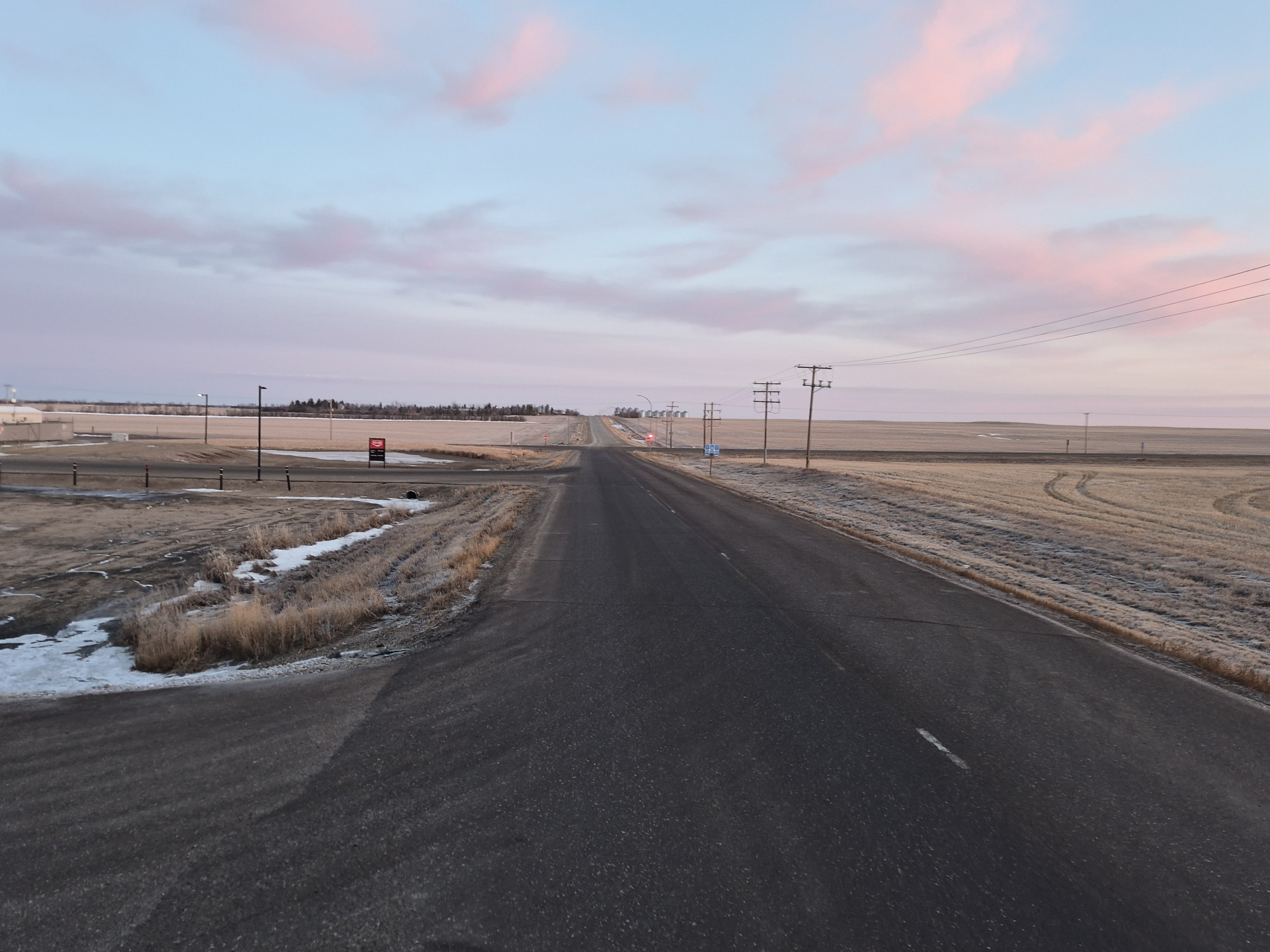
- Highway 30's northern terminus

Route information
- Maintained by Ministry of Highways and Infrastructure
- Length: 59.6 km (37.0 mi)

Major junctions
- South end: Eston Riverside Regional Park
- Highway 44 at Eston
- North end: Highway 7 near Brock

Location
- Country: Canada
- Province: Saskatchewan
- Rural municipalities: Snipe Lake, Kindersley

Highway system
- Provincial highways in Saskatchewan
← Highway 29	→ Highway 31

Highway 30 is a provincial highway in Saskatchewan, Canada. It runs from Eston Riverside Regional Park on the South Saskatchewan River north to Highway 7. Highway 30 is about 60 kilometres (37 mi) long. Eston, McMorran, and Brock are the only communities along the highway.

== Route description ==
Highway 30 begins in the Rural Municipality of Snipe Lake No. 259 near the banks of the South Saskatchewan River at the main gate of the Eston Riverside Regional Park, where it heads due north for roughly 5 kilometres (3.1 mi) to make a sharp right at an intersection with Highway 634 (which leads south to the Lancer Ferry and the village of Lancer). The highway quickly curves back due northward, heading through rural farmland for a few kilometres to enter the town of Eston, where it passes through neighbourhoods on the eastern side of town along 2nd Street SE for several blocks before having an intersection with Highway 44 (Railway Avenue) and crossing two railway lines. Leaving Eston, Highway 30 heads through rural farmland for several kilometres, traversing a switchback at the intersection with Highway 752 and passing through the hamlet of McMorran before entering the Rural Municipality of Kindersley No. 290. The road goes through a switchback as it travels along the western boundary of the village of Brock, where it crosses a railway line, before coming to an end a few kilometres later at a junction with Highway 7, with the road continuing north as Highway 657. The entire length of Highway 30 is a paved, two-lane highway.

== Major intersections ==
From south to north:

Rural municipality	Location	km	mi	Destinations	Notes
Snipe Lake No. 259		0.0	0.0	Eston Riverside Regional Park (South Saskatchewan River)	
Snipe Lake No. 259		4.9	3.0	Highway 634 south – Lancer, Lancer Ferry	
Snipe Lake No. 259	Eston	22.6	14.0	Highway 44 – Glidden, Eatonia, Elrose	
Snipe Lake No. 259		35.6	22.1	Highway 752 east	
Kindersley No. 290	Brock	55.9	34.7		
Kindersley No. 290		59.6	37.0	Highway 7 – Kindersley, Rosetown, Saskatoon Highway 657 north – Plenty	Northern terminus
1.000 mi = 1.609 km; 1.000 km = 0.621 mi

== See also ==
- Transportation in Saskatchewan
- Roads in Saskatchewan
