= Rural Municipality of Snipe Lake No. 259 =

Rural municipality in Saskatchewan, Canada

Snipe Lake No. 259
- Rural municipality
- Rural Municipality of Snipe Lake No. 259

- Location of the RM of Snipe Lake No. 259 in Saskatchewan
- Coordinates: 51.011°N 108.717°W
- Country: Canada
- Province: Saskatchewan
- Census division: 8
- SARM division: 3
- Formed: December 11, 1911

Government
  - Reeve: Bill Owens
  - Governing body: RM of Snipe Lake No. 259 Council
  - Administrator: Brian Shauf
  - Office location: Eston

Area (2016)
  - Land: 1,573.8 km^{2} (607.6 sq mi)

Population (2016)
  - Total: 396
  - Density: 0.3/km^{2} (0.78/sq mi)
- Time zone: CST
  - Summer (DST): CST
- Postal code: S0L 1A0
- Area codes: 306 and 639
- Highway(s): Highway 30; Highway 44; Highway 639; Highway 658; Highway 752
- Railway(s): Canadian National Railway

The Rural Municipality of Snipe Lake No. 259 (2016 population: 396) is a rural municipality (RM) in the Canadian province of Saskatchewan within Census Division No. 8 and SARM Division No. 3.

== History ==
The RM of Snipe Lake No. 259 incorporated as a rural municipality on December 11, 1911.

== Geography ==
=== Communities and localities ===
The following urban municipalities are surrounded by the RM.

Towns

- Eston

The following unincorporated communities are within the RM.

Localities

- Bickleigh
- Isham
- McMorran
- Penkill
- Plato, dissolved as a village, March 28, 1995.
- Richlea, dissolved as a village, December 31, 1958
- Snipe Lake
- Totnes
- Witley

=== Climate ===
Climate data for Eston
Month	Jan	Feb	Mar	Apr	May	Jun	Jul	Aug	Sep	Oct	Nov	Dec	Year
Record high °C (°F)	9.5 (49.1)	13.5 (56.3)	20.5 (68.9)	32.5 (90.5)	36.1 (97.0)	39.5 (103.1)	39 (102)	38.9 (102.0)	36.7 (98.1)	32.2 (90.0)	21.7 (71.1)	11.7 (53.1)	39.5 (103.1)
Mean daily maximum °C (°F)	−9.5 (14.9)	−6.5 (20.3)	1.5 (34.7)	11.8 (53.2)	19.3 (66.7)	23.5 (74.3)	25.6 (78.1)	25 (77)	18.7 (65.7)	11.7 (53.1)	−0.5 (31.1)	−7.7 (18.1)	9.4 (48.9)
Daily mean °C (°F)	−14.3 (6.3)	−11.5 (11.3)	−4 (25)	4.8 (40.6)	11.7 (53.1)	16.2 (61.2)	18.1 (64.6)	17.4 (63.3)	11.4 (52.5)	4.9 (40.8)	−5.6 (21.9)	−12.5 (9.5)	3 (37)
Mean daily minimum °C (°F)	−19.1 (−2.4)	−16.5 (2.3)	−9.5 (14.9)	−2.2 (28.0)	4 (39)	8.8 (47.8)	10.5 (50.9)	9.7 (49.5)	4 (39)	−2 (28)	−10.7 (12.7)	−17.3 (0.9)	−3.4 (25.9)
Record low °C (°F)	−47.8 (−54.0)	−40.5 (−40.9)	−40.6 (−41.1)	−28.6 (−19.5)	−11.1 (12.0)	−4.4 (24.1)	−1.1 (30.0)	−2.8 (27.0)	−10.6 (12.9)	−26 (−15)	−35 (−31)	−43.9 (−47.0)	−47.8 (−54.0)
Average precipitation mm (inches)	13 (0.5)	9.5 (0.37)	14.8 (0.58)	19.5 (0.77)	37.8 (1.49)	53.2 (2.09)	53.1 (2.09)	39.3 (1.55)	20.3 (0.80)	11 (0.4)	11.1 (0.44)	14.6 (0.57)	297.2 (11.70)
Source: Environment Canada

== Eston Riverside Regional Park ==
Eston Riverside Regional Park (50.9639°N 108.7664°W) is a regional park in the RM of Snipe Lake on the north bank of the South Saskatchewan River, about 21 kilometres (13 mi) south of the town of Eston. Access to the park is from Highway 30.

Eston Riverside Park has a campground, cabins, a golf course, ball diamonds, an outdoor swimming pool, and access to the river. The campground has 48 campsites, 18 of which are full service.

Eston Riverside Golf Course is a 9-hole, grass greens course. The course is a par 36 with two sets of tees, one totally 3,341 yards and the other 2,605 yards. There is a licensed clubhouse, driving range, and putting green.

== Demographics ==
Population history (1981–2016)
Year	Pop.	±%
1981	903	—
1986	874	−3.2%
1991	686	−21.5%
1996	598	−12.8%
2001	524	−12.4%
2006	427	−18.5%
2011	452	+5.9%
2016	396	−12.4%
Source: Statistics Canada via Saskatchewan Bureau of Statistics

In the 2021 Census of Population conducted by Statistics Canada, the RM of Snipe Lake No. 259 had a population of 410 living in 177 of its 290 total private dwellings, a change of 3.5% from its 2016 population of 396. With a land area of 1,615.91 km^{2} (623.91 sq mi), it had a population density of 0.3/km^{2} (0.7/sq mi) in 2021.

In the 2016 Census of Population, the RM of Snipe Lake No. 259 recorded a population of 396 living in 176 of its 300 total private dwellings, a −12.4% change from its 2011 population of 452. With a land area of 1,573.8 km^{2} (607.6 sq mi), it had a population density of 0.3/km^{2} (0.7/sq mi) in 2016.

== Government ==
The RM of Snipe Lake No. 259 is governed by an elected municipal council and an appointed administrator that meets on the second Thursday of every month. The reeve of the RM is Bill Owens while its administrator is Brian Shauf. The RM's office is located in Eston.

== See also ==
- List of rural municipalities in Saskatchewan
