= The Davidson Leader =

Canadian newspaper in Saskatchewan

- Front page of the November 18, 2019 edition
- Type: Weekly newspaper
- Owner: Dan Senick
- Publisher: Dan Senick
- Founded: 1904
- City: Davidson, Saskatchewan
- Country: Canada
- Circulation: 1,228
- Website: http://leaderonline.ca/

The Davidson Leader is a weekly newspaper in Saskatchewan, Canada, serving the communities of Davidson, Girvin, Bladworth, Kenaston, Hanley, Dundurn, Elbow, Loreburn, Imperial, and Craik. It is published by Davidson Leader Inc.

== History ==
The Leader has provided uninterrupted weekly news since 1904. The publisher and editor is Dan Senick.

In 2010, the Department of Canadian Heritage announced that it would provide a grant of over $19,000 to The Leader as part of its Canada Periodical Fund.

In 2019, the newspaper attracted media attention with an announcement that it would be holding an essay contest to find a new owner and publisher, with the winner taking control of The Leader for just $1.

== See also ==
- List of newspapers in Canada
