= Lancer Ferry =

Ferry across the South Saskatchewan River in Saskatchewan, Canada

Coordinates: 50.984°N 108.881°W

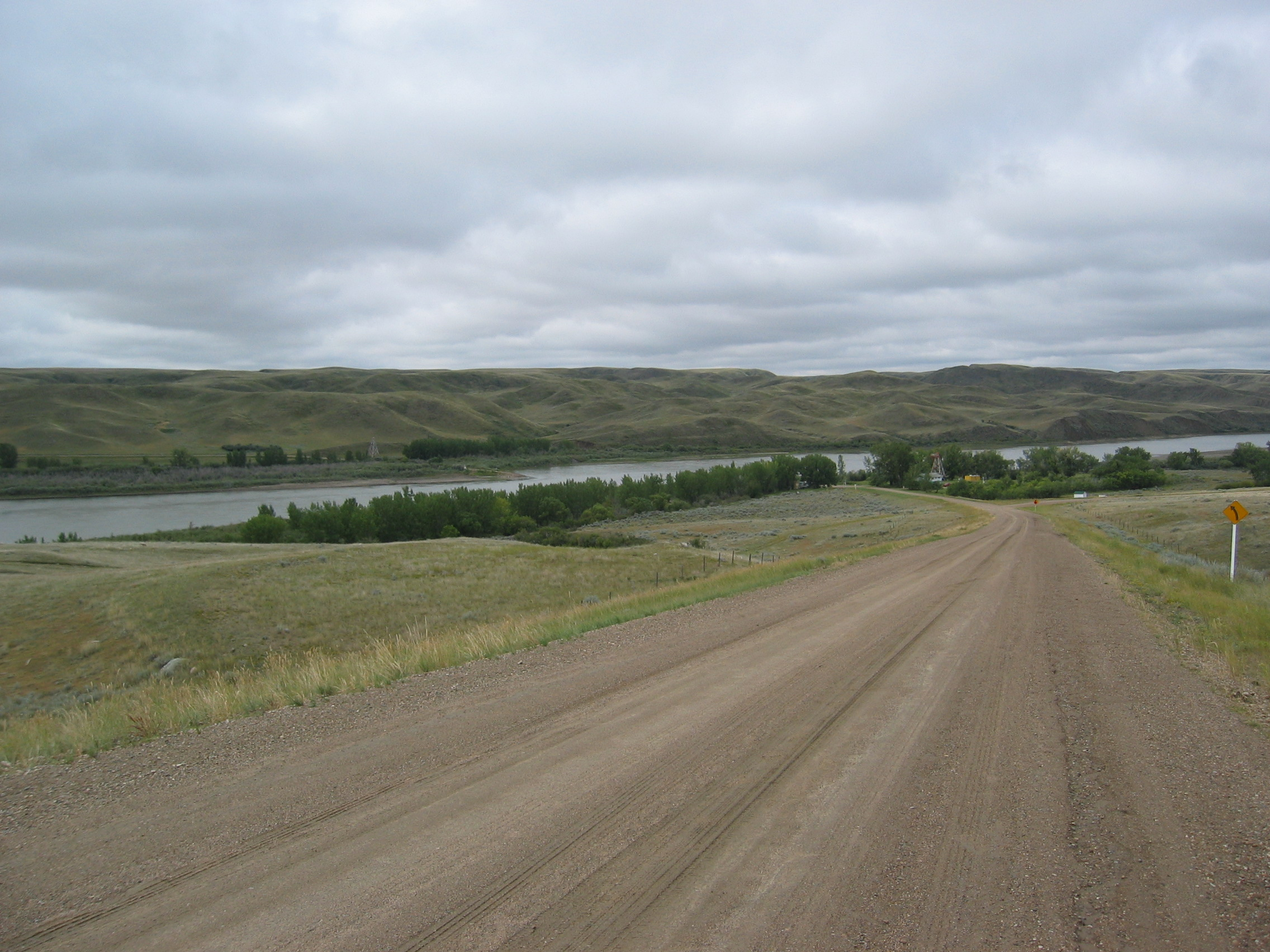
North approach to the Lancer ferry

The Lancer Ferry is a cable ferry in the Canadian province of Saskatchewan. The ferry crosses the South Saskatchewan River, linking the communities of Lancer with Eston and providing a connection between Highway 30 and Highway 32, and is part of Hwy 634.

The six-car ferry is operated by the Saskatchewan Ministry of Highways and Infrastructure. The ferry is free of tolls and operates between 7:00 am and midnight, during the ice-free season. The ferry has a length of 16.7 metres (55 ft), a width of 6.7 metres (22 ft), and a load limit of 18.5 tonnes (18.2 long tons; 20.4 short tons).

The ferry carries almost 7,000 vehicles a year.

== See also ==
- List of crossings of the South Saskatchewan River
