= Macrorie, Saskatchewan =

Village in Saskatchewan, Canada

Macrorie
- Village
- Village of Macrorie
- Location of Macrorie in Saskatchewan Macrorie (Canada)
- Coordinates: 51.322°N 107.082°W
- Country: Canada
- Province: Saskatchewan
- Census division: 12
- Rural municipality: Fertile Valley No. 285
- Incorporated (Village): February 8, 1912

Government
  - Type: Municipal
  - Governing body: Macrorie Village Council
  - Mayor: Rick Barger

Area
  - Total: 0.77 km^{2} (0.30 sq mi)

Population (2016)
  - Total: 68
  - Density: 88.4/km^{2} (229/sq mi)
- Time zone: CST
- Postal code: S0L 2E0
- Area code: 306
- Highways: Highway 44; Highway 45
- Railways: Canadian National Railway

Macrorie (2016 population: 68) is a village in the Canadian province of Saskatchewan within the Rural Municipality of Fertile Valley No. 285 and Census Division No. 12. The village contains a Co-op gas and grocery store. Danielson Provincial Park is 20 km southeast on Highway 44.

== History ==
First settled in 1903, Macrorie incorporated as a village on February 8, 1912.

== Demographics ==
Population history (1981–2016)
Year	Pop.	±%
1981	133	—
1986	138	+3.8%
1991	126	−8.7%
1996	110	−12.7%
2001	96	−12.7%
2006	78	−18.8%
2011	65	−16.7%
2016	68	+4.6%
Source: Statistics Canada via Saskatchewan Bureau of Statistics

In the 2021 Census of Population conducted by Statistics Canada, Macrorie had a population of 65 living in 35 of its 44 total private dwellings, a change of −4.4% from its 2016 population of 68. With a land area of 0.72 km^{2} (0.28 sq mi), it had a population density of 90.3/km^{2} (233.8/sq mi) in 2021.

In the 2016 Census of Population, the Village of Macrorie recorded a population of 68 living in 37 of its 46 total private dwellings, a 4.4% change from its 2011 population of 65. With a land area of 0.77 km^{2} (0.30 sq mi), it had a population density of 88.3/km^{2} (228.7/sq mi) in 2016.

== Notable people ==
- Howard Fredeen (1921–2021) was an animal breeding researcher.

== See also ==
- List of communities in Saskatchewan
- List of villages in Saskatchewan
