= Laporte, Saskatchewan =

Coordinates: 51°12′52″N 109°30′37″W

Laporte is a hamlet in the Canadian province of Saskatchewan. Located within the Rural Municipality of Chesterfield No. 261, it lies at the intersection of Highways 44 and 635. The Mantario subdivision of the Big Sky Rail railway passes through the community. Listed as a designated place by Statistics Canada, the hamlet had a population of five in the Canada 2006 Census.
