= Howard Fredeen =

Canadian animal breeding researcher (1921–2021)

Howard Townley Fredeen (December 10, 1921 – December 27, 2021) was a Canadian animal breeding researcher.

Born in Macrorie, Saskatchewan, Freeden received an MSc in Animal Science from the University of Saskatchewan in 1947 and joined the staff of the Lacombe Research Station in Alberta, subsequently obtaining a PhD in Animal Breeding and Genetics from Iowa State University in 1952. Fredeen spent his entire career with Agriculture Canada's Research Branch, retiring on July 6, 1984. With the late J.G. Stothart he was the codeveloper of the Lacombe pigs, a breed still renowned for its excellence.

Fredeen played a major role in developing Canadian livestock breeding policies and in introducing innovative breeding practices and new techniques for carcass evaluation. As well as writing more than 300 scientific and technical papers, he has established an international reputation by frequently representing Agriculture Canada abroad. Fredeen is also the author of several renowned books and guides. He has received numerous honours, including a fellowship in the Agricultural Institute of Canada, the Public Service of Canada Merit Award and the Lacombe Citizen of the Year Award.

Fredeen was also awarded the Genetics Society of Canada Award for Excellence as well as the American Board of Human Development's National Health Development Award for his work in the human genetic fields. His discovery of the functioning of specific gene functions in cattle and swine, as well as his work on the Human Genome Project are still implemented today.

In 2016, Fredeen received the Outstanding Achievement Award from the Alberta Historical Resources Foundation in recognition of his efforts to preserve history in the region. He turned 100 on December 10, 2021, and died on December 27.
