= Robert Gordon Robertson =

Canadian politician

The Honourable (Robert) Gordon Robertson PC CC FRSC

Commissioner of the Northwest Territories
- In office November 15, 1953 – July 12, 1963
- Preceded by: Hugh Andrew Young
- Succeeded by: Bent Gestur Sivertz

Personal details
- Born: May 19, 1917 Davidson, Saskatchewan, Canada
- Died: January 15, 2013 (aged 95) Ottawa, Ontario

(Robert) Gordon Robertson, PC CC FRSC (May 19, 1917 – January 15, 2013) was the commissioner of the Northwest Territories from November 15, 1953 to July 12, 1963 who, having been sworn in at the age of 36, remains the youngest person to ever hold the office. He went on to become Clerk of the Privy Council and Secretary to the Cabinet, the top position in the Canadian public service.

== Biography ==
Born in Davidson, Saskatchewan, Robertson was educated at University of Saskatchewan, Exeter College, Oxford (where he was a Rhodes Scholar) and University of Toronto. He joined the Department of External Affairs in 1941. From 1945 to 1948 he worked in the Prime Minister's Office of William Lyon Mackenzie King, and from 1948 to 1953 he was in the Privy Council Office under Prime Minister Louis St. Laurent. In 1953 he was appointed Deputy Minister of the newly formed Department of Northern Affairs and National Resources. By virtue of that position he was also Commissioner of the Northwest Territories. He remained in this combination of positions until 1963, when incoming Prime Minister Lester B. Pearson appointed him Clerk of the Privy Council and Secretary to the Cabinet, the top position in the Canadian public service. He held this position under Pearson and then under Pierre Trudeau until 1975. In that year, Trudeau appointed him Secretary to the Cabinet for Federal-Provincial Relations, to support Trudeau in his constitutional reform agenda. He remained in that position for most of the government of Joe Clark, retiring in December 1979.

Awarded an honorary doctorate of laws from the University of Saskatchewan for outstanding service with the Department of Northern Affairs and National Resources and Commissioner of the Northwest Territories Council in 1959. In 1970, he won the Vanier Medal of the Institute of Public Administration of Canada.

Robertson was a recipient of the Public Service Outstanding Achievement Award in 1972; in 1976 he was made a Companion of the Order of Canada, and a member of the Privy Council in 1982.

Robertson served as chancellor of Carleton University in Ottawa from 1980 to 1990.

In 2000, Robertson published Memoirs of a Very Civil Servant, which recounted his experiences as a senior civil servant under five Canadian prime ministers.

In 2022, in association with the Inuit Advisory Council and Inuit in the region and in the North, Carleton University re-named Robertson Hall (named after Robertson) to Pigiarvik (ᐱᒋᐊᕐᕕᒃ), which is an Inuit name that translates to “a place to begin” or “the starting place."

== Personal life ==
Robertson was born to John Gordon Robertson and Lydia A. Paulson. A prominent leader in Saskatchewan John Gordon Robertson served as Live Stock Commissioner in the province of Saskatchewan following his service in the Great War. Additionally John Robertson held many administrative offices in the province and served on several boards and organisations. Robert Gordon Robertson had one brother, former chairman of the CDIC, Ronald Neil Robertson, and one sister, Jessie Lucille Robertson.

The Honourable Robert Gordon Robertson died on January 15, 2013.

Academic offices
Preceded by Gerhard Herzberg	Chancellor of Carleton University; 1980–1990	Succeeded by Pauline Jewett
