= SARM Division No. 5 =

Division in Saskatchewan, Canada

SARM Division No. 5 is a Saskatchewan Association of Rural Municipalities (SARM) division within the Canadian province of Saskatchewan. It is located in the north-central area of the province. There are 57 rural municipalities in this division. The current director for Division 5 is Judy Harwood.

== List of RMs in SARM Division No. 5 ==
By numerical RM No.

- RM No. 250 Last Mountain Valley
- RM No. 251 Big Arm
- RM No. 252 Arm River
- RM No. 253 Willner
- RM No. 254 Loreburn
- RM No. 279 Mount Hope
- RM No. 280 Wreford
- RM No. 281 Wood Creek
- RM No. 282 McCraney
- RM No. 283 Rosedale
- RM No. 284 Rudy
- RM No. 285 Fertile Valley
- RM No. 286 Milden
- RM No. 309 Prairie Rose
- RM No. 310 Usborne
- RM No. 312 Morris
- RM No. 313 Lost River
- RM No. 314 Dundurn
- RM No. 315 Montrose
- RM No. 316 Harris
- RM No. 339 Leroy
- RM No. 340 Wolverine
- RM No. 341 Viscount
- RM No. 342 Colonsay
- RM No. 343 Blucher
- RM No. 344 Corman Park
- RM No. 345 Vanscoy
- RM No. 346 Perdue
- RM No. 369 St. Peter
- RM No. 370 Humboldt
- RM No. 371 Bayne
- RM No. 372 Grant
- RM No. 373 Aberdeen
- RM No. 376 Eagle Creek
- RM No. 399 Lake Lenore
- RM No. 400 Three Lakes
- RM No. 401 Hoodoo
- RM No. 402 Fish Creek
- RM No. 403 Rosthern
- RM No. 404 Laird
- RM No. 429 Flett's Springs
- RM No. 430 Invergordon
- RM No. 431 St. Louis
- RM No. 434 Blaine Lake
- RM No. 435 Redberry
- RM No. 459 Kinistino
- RM No. 460 Birch Hills
- RM No. 461 Prince Albert
- RM No. 463 Duck Lake
- RM No. 464 Leask
- RM No. 490 Garden River
- RM No. 491 Buckland
- RM No. 493 Shellbrook
- RM No. 494 Canwood
- RM No. 520 Paddockwood
- RM No. 521 Lakeland
- RM No. 555 Big River

== See also ==
- List of regions of Saskatchewan
- List of census divisions of Saskatchewan
- List of communities in Saskatchewan
- Geography of Saskatchewan
