= Wiseton, Saskatchewan =

Community in Saskatchewan, Canada

Wiseton
- Location within Saskatchewan Location within Canada
- Coordinates: 51.185281°N 107.385708°W
- Country: Canada
- Province: Saskatchewan
- Region: Southwest
- Census division: 12
- Rural municipality: Milden No. 286

Government
  - Governing body: Wiseton Village Council: Darren Dubord, Jordan Mills, Tyrel Omiecinski
  - Mayor: Cheryl Greuel
  - Administrator: Krista James

Area
  - Total: 0.77 km^{2} (0.30 sq mi)

Population (2006)
  - Total: 96
  - Density: 125/km^{2} (320/sq mi)
- Time zone: CST
- Postal code: S0L 3M0
- Area code: 306
- Highways: Highway 44
- Railways: Canadian National Railway

Wiseton (2016 population: 79) is a village in the Canadian province of Saskatchewan within the Rural Municipality of Milden No. 286 and Census Division No. 12. The village is located at the junction of Highway 44 and Highway 664 approximately 40 kilometres (25 mi) southwest of Outlook.

== History ==
Wiseton incorporated as a village on September 23, 1913.

== Demographics ==
Population history (1981–2016)
Year	Pop.	±%
1981	195	—
1986	172	−11.8%
1991	120	−30.2%
1996	125	+4.2%
2001	111	−11.2%
2006	96	−13.5%
2011	88	−8.3%
2016	79	−10.2%
Source: Statistics Canada via Saskatchewan Bureau of Statistics

In the 2021 Census of Population conducted by Statistics Canada, Wiseton had a population of 64 living in 29 of its 48 total private dwellings, a change of −19% from its 2016 population of 79. With a land area of 0.71 km^{2} (0.27 sq mi), it had a population density of 90.1/km^{2} (233.5/sq mi) in 2021.

In the 2016 Census of Population, the Village of Wiseton recorded a population of 79 living in 38 of its 48 total private dwellings, a −11.4% change from its 2011 population of 88. With a land area of 0.77 km^{2} (0.30 sq mi), it had a population density of 102.6/km^{2} (265.7/sq mi) in 2016.

== See also ==
- List of communities in Saskatchewan
