= Cutbank, Saskatchewan =

Community in Saskatchewan, Canada

Coordinates: 51°16′23″N 107°02′32″W

Cutbank is an unincorporated hamlet in the Rural Municipality of Loreburn No. 254, Saskatchewan, Canada. It is accessed from Highway 44 and is north of the Gardiner Dam and north-east of Danielson Provincial Park.

== See also ==
- List of communities in Saskatchewan
- List of hamlets in Saskatchewan
