= Plato, Saskatchewan =

Plato
- Unincorporated community
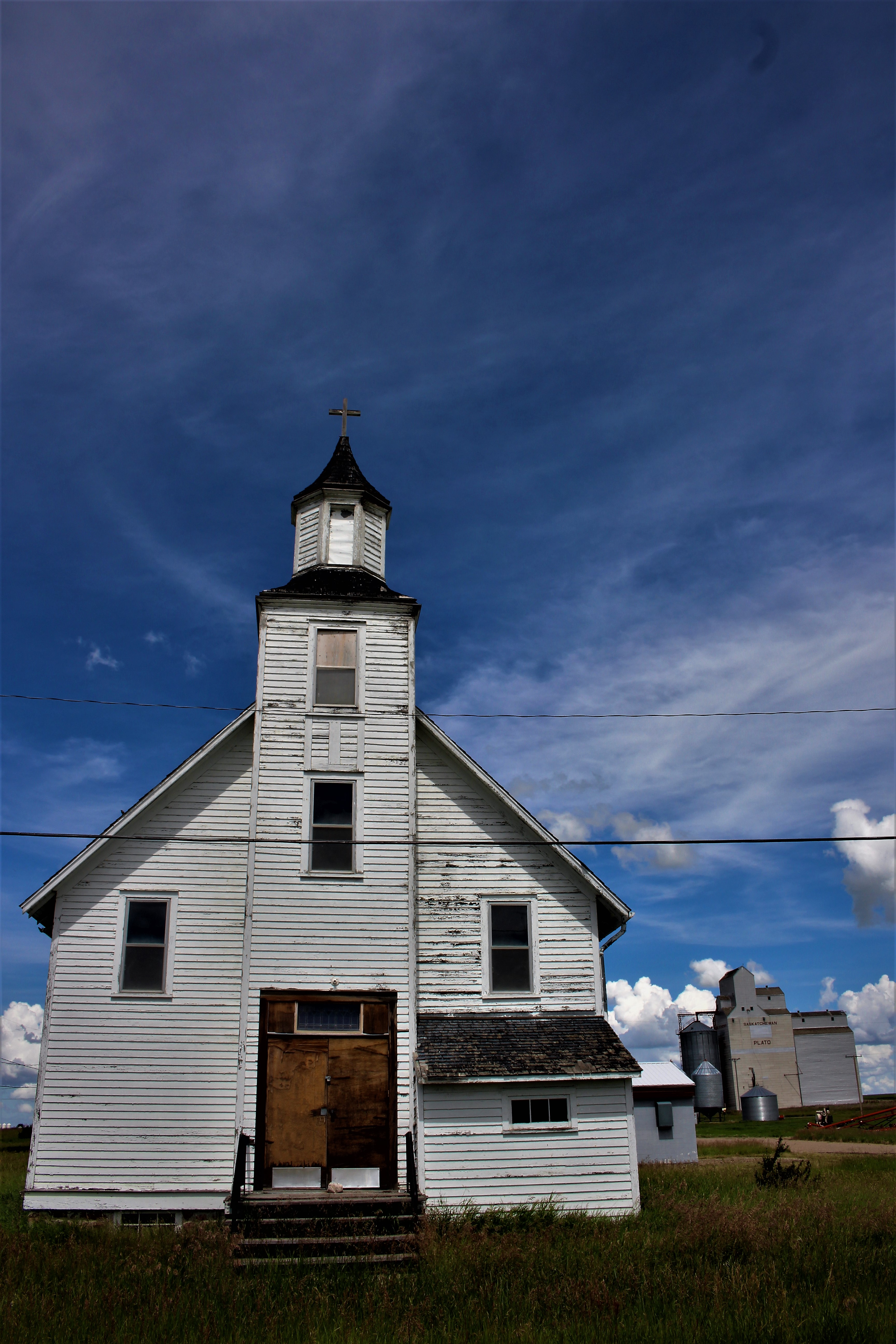
- Church and grain elevator in Plato

- Location within Saskatchewan Location within Canada
- Coordinates: 51.1000°N 108.2703°W
- Country: Canada
- Province: Saskatchewan
- Region: Southwest
- Census division: 8
- Rural Municipality: Snipe Lake No. 259

Government
  - Type: Municipal
  - Governing body: Rural Municipality of Snipe Lake
- Time zone: UTC-6 (CST)
- Area code: 306
- Highways: Highway 44; Highway 342
- Railways: Canadian Pacific Railway

Plato is an unincorporated community within the Rural Municipality of Snipe Lake No. 259, Saskatchewan, Canada. The community was named after Plato, Minnesota, which had been the home town of Richard and Agnes Brust, early pioneers.

The town is a few hundred yards off Saskatchewan Highway 44. While the highway is paved, the town itself contains only gravel roads, and several houses remain abandoned. The town retains a small post office.

== See also ==
- List of communities in Saskatchewan
