= Rural Municipality of Milden No. 286 =

Rural municipality in Saskatchewan, Canada

Milden No. 286
- Rural municipality
- Rural Municipality of Milden No. 286

- Location of the RM of Milden No. 286 in Saskatchewan
- Coordinates: 51.422°N 107.550°W
- Country: Canada
- Province: Saskatchewan
- Census division: 12
- SARM division: 5
- Formed: December 12, 1910

Government
  - Reeve: Grant Thomson
  - Governing body: RM of Milden No. 286 Council
  - Administrator: Denise Ward
  - Office location: Milden

Area (2016)
  - Land: 735.29 km^{2} (283.90 sq mi)

Population (2016)
  - Total: 327
  - Density: 0.4/km^{2} (1.0/sq mi)
- Time zone: CST
  - Summer (DST): CST
- Area codes: 306 and 639

The Rural Municipality of Milden No. 286 (2016 population: 327) is a rural municipality (RM) in the Canadian province of Saskatchewan within Census Division No. 12 and SARM Division No. 5.

== History ==
The RM of Milden No. 286 incorporated as a rural municipality on December 12, 1910.

== Geography ==
There are two lakes within the RM – Barber Lake and Milden Lake. Barber Lake and its outflow, Macdonald Creek, are within the Barber Lake (SK 050) Important Bird Area (IBA) of Canada. The IBA covers an area of 56.51 square kilometres (21.82 sq mi) and is an important habitat to several bird species, including the canvasback, Ross's goose, lesser scaup, eared grebe, American coot, dowitcher, Wilson's phalarope, ferruginous hawk, long-billed curlew, upland sandpiper, and the chestnut-collared longspur.

=== Communities and localities ===
The following urban municipalities are surrounded by the RM.

Villages

- Dinsmore
- Milden
- Wiseton

== Demographics ==
Population history (1981–2016)
Year	Pop.	±%
1981	453	—
1986	381	−15.9%
1991	328	−13.9%
1996	326	−0.6%
2001	289	−11.3%
2006	215	−25.6%
2011	283	+31.6%
2016	327	+15.5%
Source: Statistics Canada via Saskatchewan Bureau of Statistics

In the 2021 Census of Population conducted by Statistics Canada, the RM of Milden No. 286 had a population of 280 living in 75 of its 97 total private dwellings, a change of −14.4% from its 2016 population of 327. With a land area of 732.95 km^{2} (282.99 sq mi), it had a population density of 0.4/km^{2} (1.0/sq mi) in 2021.

In the 2016 Census of Population, the RM of Milden No. 286 recorded a population of 327 living in 97 of its 114 total private dwellings, a 15.5% change from its 2011 population of 283. With a land area of 735.29 km^{2} (283.90 sq mi), it had a population density of 0.4/km^{2} (1.2/sq mi) in 2016.

== Attractions ==
- Milden Lake
- Milden Community Museum
- Yester Years Community Museum

== Government ==
The RM of Milden No. 286 is governed by an elected municipal council and an appointed administrator that meets on the second Wednesday of every month. The reeve of the RM is Grant Thomson while its administrator is Denise Ward. The RM's office is located in Milden.

== Transportation ==
- Saskatchewan Highway 15
- Saskatchewan Highway 42
- Saskatchewan Highway 44
- Saskatchewan Highway 655

== See also ==
- List of rural municipalities in Saskatchewan
