= Girvin, Saskatchewan =

Hamlet in Saskatchewan, Canada

Girvin
- Hamlet
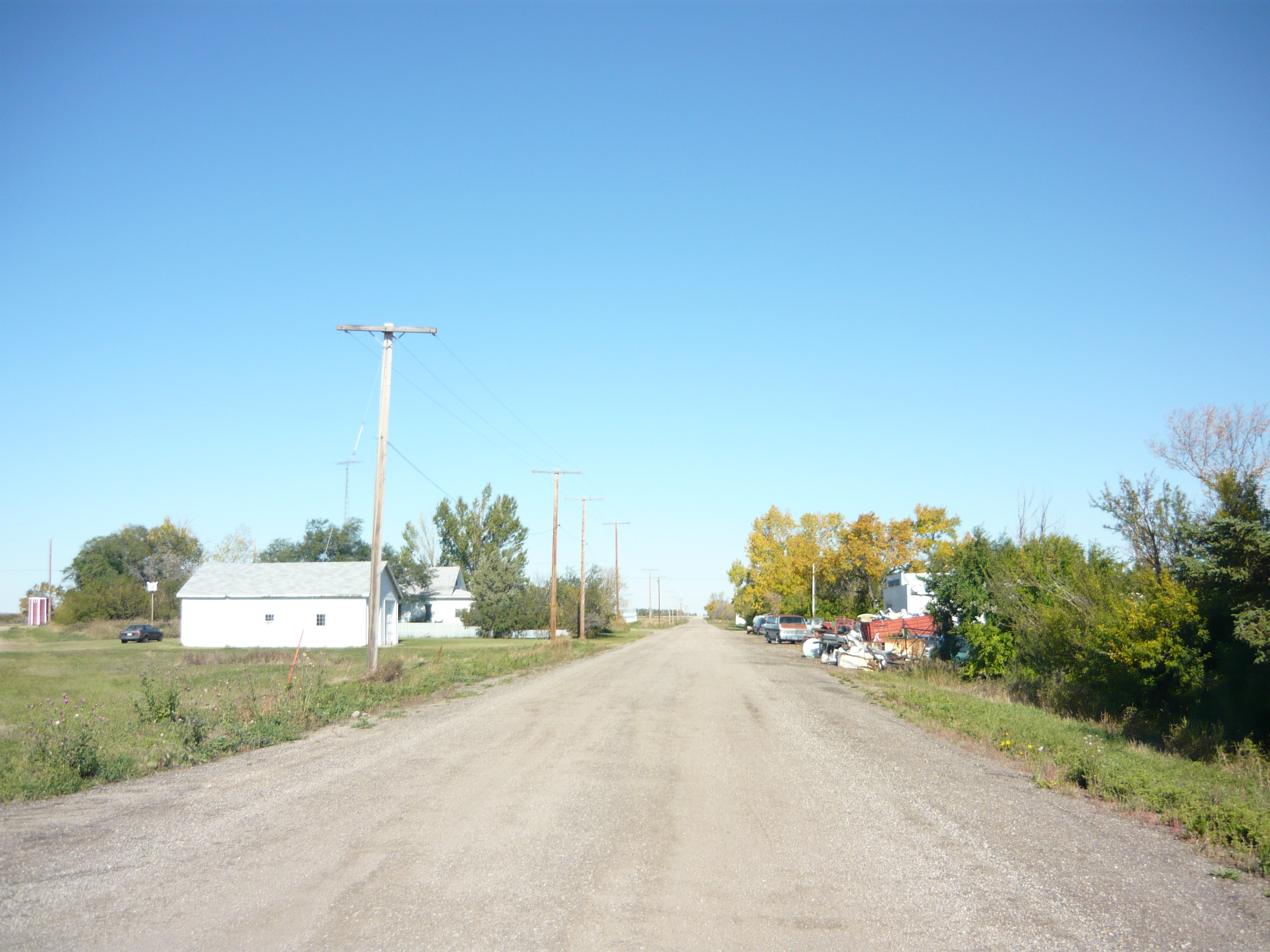
- King Street
- Motto: Here People Count
- Location of Girvin in Saskatchewan Girvin (Canada)
- Coordinates: 51.15°N 105.9172°W
- Country: Canada
- Province: Saskatchewan
- Region: Saskatchewan
- Census division: 11
- Rural Municipality: Arm River No. 252
- Established: 19??
- unincorporated (Hamlet): December 19, 2005

Area
  - Total: 3.8 km^{2} (1.5 sq mi)

Population (2006)
  - Total: 20
  - Density: 5.3/km^{2} (14/sq mi)
- Postal code: S0G 1X0
- Area code: 306
- Highways: Highway 11; Highway 749
- Waterways: Lake Diefenbaker *Last Mountain Lake

Girvin is a former village of 20 people in Saskatchewan, Canada. It is located midway between Regina and Saskatoon on Highway 11 between the towns of Davidson and Craik. The village was formally dissolved in 2005; its remaining population is now counted as part of the Rural Municipality of Arm River No. 252.

== History ==
Prior to December 19, 2005, Girvin was unincorporated as a village, and was restructured as a hamlet under the jurisdiction of the RM of Arm River No. 252 on that date.

== Demographics ==
In the 2021 Census of Population conducted by Statistics Canada, Girvin had a population of 25 living in 11 of its 11 total private dwellings, a change of 66.7% from its 2016 population of 15. With a land area of 0.78 km^{2} (0.30 sq mi), it had a population density of 32.1/km^{2} (83.0/sq mi) in 2021.

== History ==
The town’s name was in honour of John Alexander Girvin, a Winnipeg-based contractor who was responsible for the construction of countless railroad stations across the prairies. The Qu’Appelle, Long Lake, and Saskatchewan Railroad and Steamboat Company railway passed through the area in the 1890s. Settlement of the area followed soon after, in about 1902 and consisted mostly of immigrants from Ontario. A school (which closed in 1970) and post office opened April 1, 1905 with a restaurant, veterinarian, Massey-Harris dealership, lumber yard, butcher, hotel, bank, livery, blacksmith and a 3 story hotel following soon after. In 1907, the community had grown to such a size that it was incorporated as a village. Over the next few years, the town continued to grow and at its height, in 1915, the town boasted three grain elevators (the British America elevator, the Canadian Elevator Company elevator and the S.G. Detchon elevator.) The town also had hockey, football, curling and baseball teams. Girvin’s population peaked at 151 people in 1926 but slid to only 93 residents in 1941, only to rebound slightly in the 1950s with 140 people. This however, was only a short-term reprieve. Beginning in the 1960s, the population once again began to fall. By the 1980s the only business left in town was a gas station and garage. In 2004 the skating rink collapsed. Girvin lost its village status on December 19, 2005.

Today there are twenty residents with no businesses but the town is home to a large metal sculpture of a bison and Red River Cart created by Don Wilkins.

== Attractions ==
The Girvin Pump House, constructed in 1906, is situated on a 380-square metre piece of land near the railway tracks. It provided water for horses hauling grain into town and some townspeople also used its water for doing laundry. It is the only pump house in Saskatchewan and has been recognized as a Municipal Heritage Property since 1994. Originally, it worked by the way of a gas pump that drew water to a tank at the top of the pump house. The tower portion of this building is a smaller version of the traditional railway water towers that were common across the prairies. The gas pump was subsequently replaced with an electric one. When the horses needed water, a rope was pulled, which released the water and filled a horse trough at the front of the building. Eventually, as cars and tractors replaced horses on the farm, the pump house fell out of use.

== Gallery ==
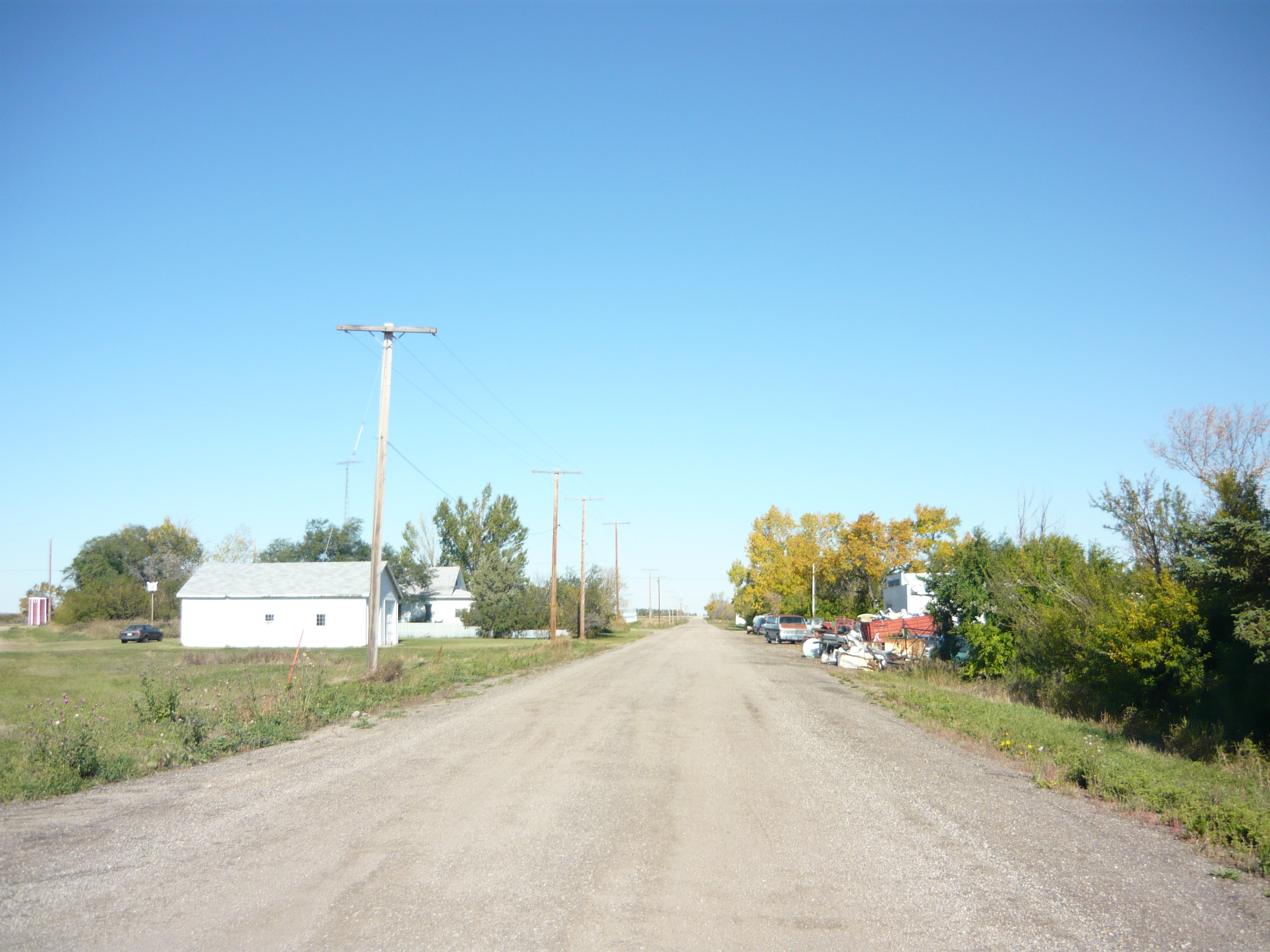
View down King Street

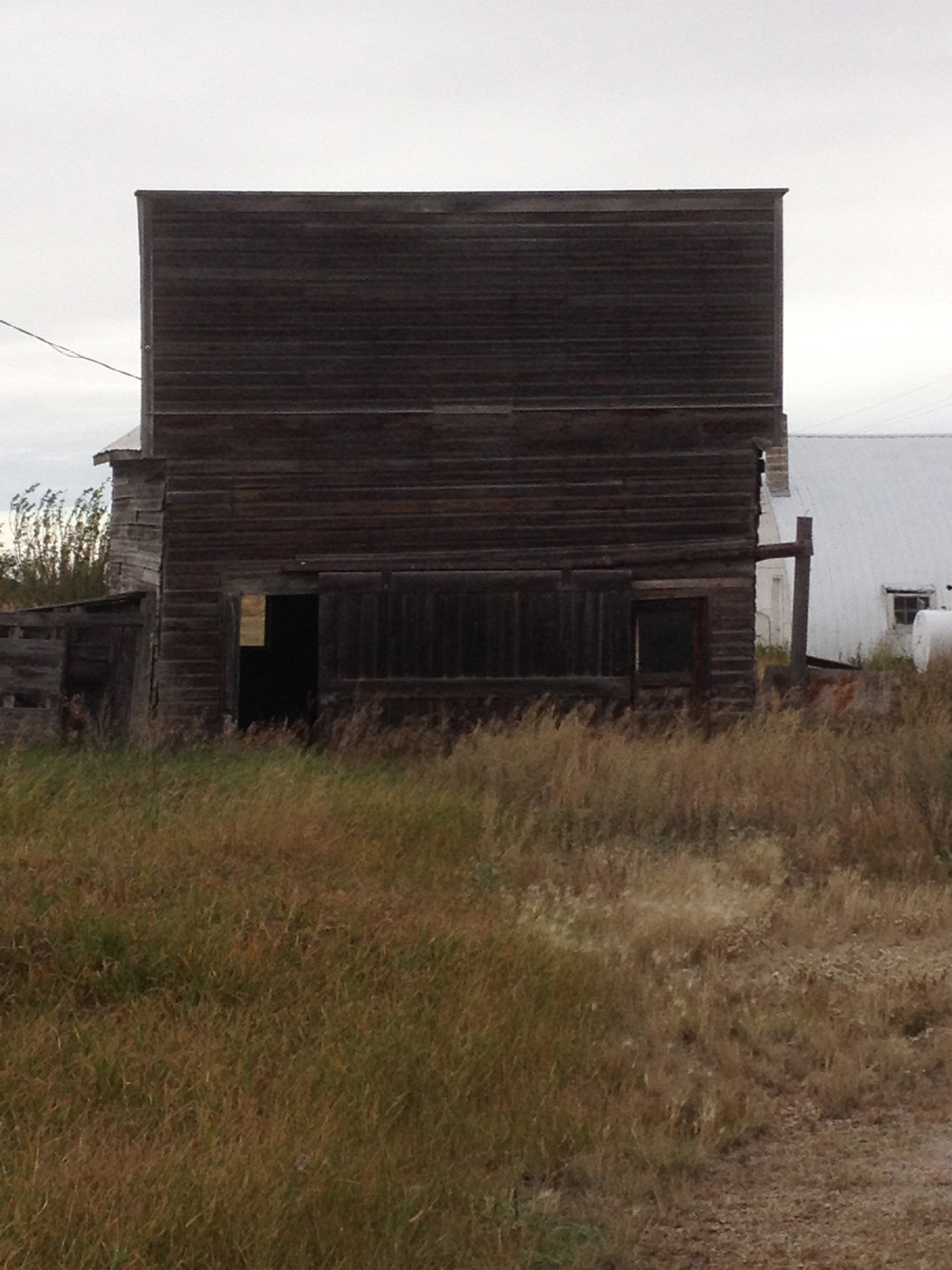

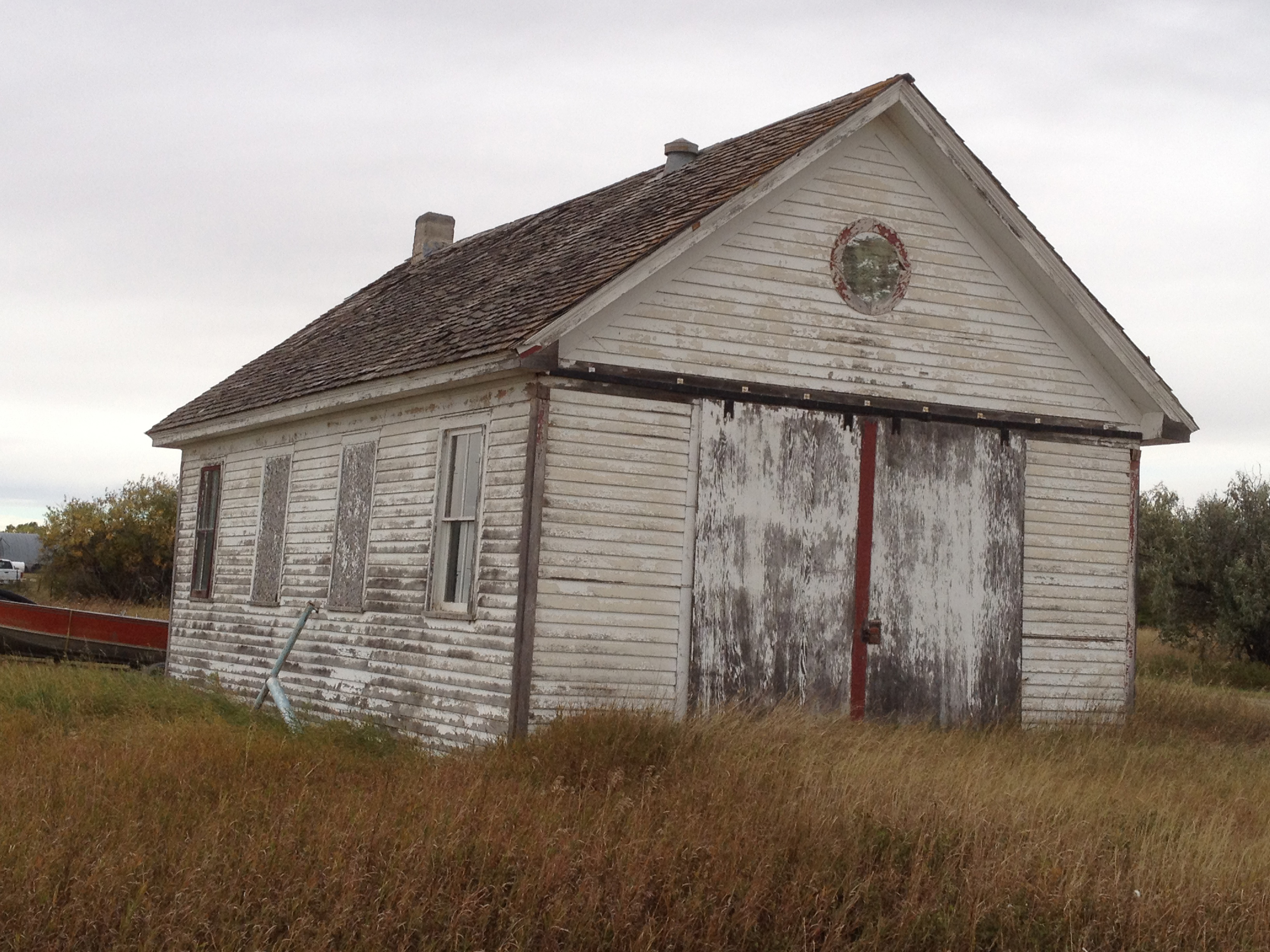

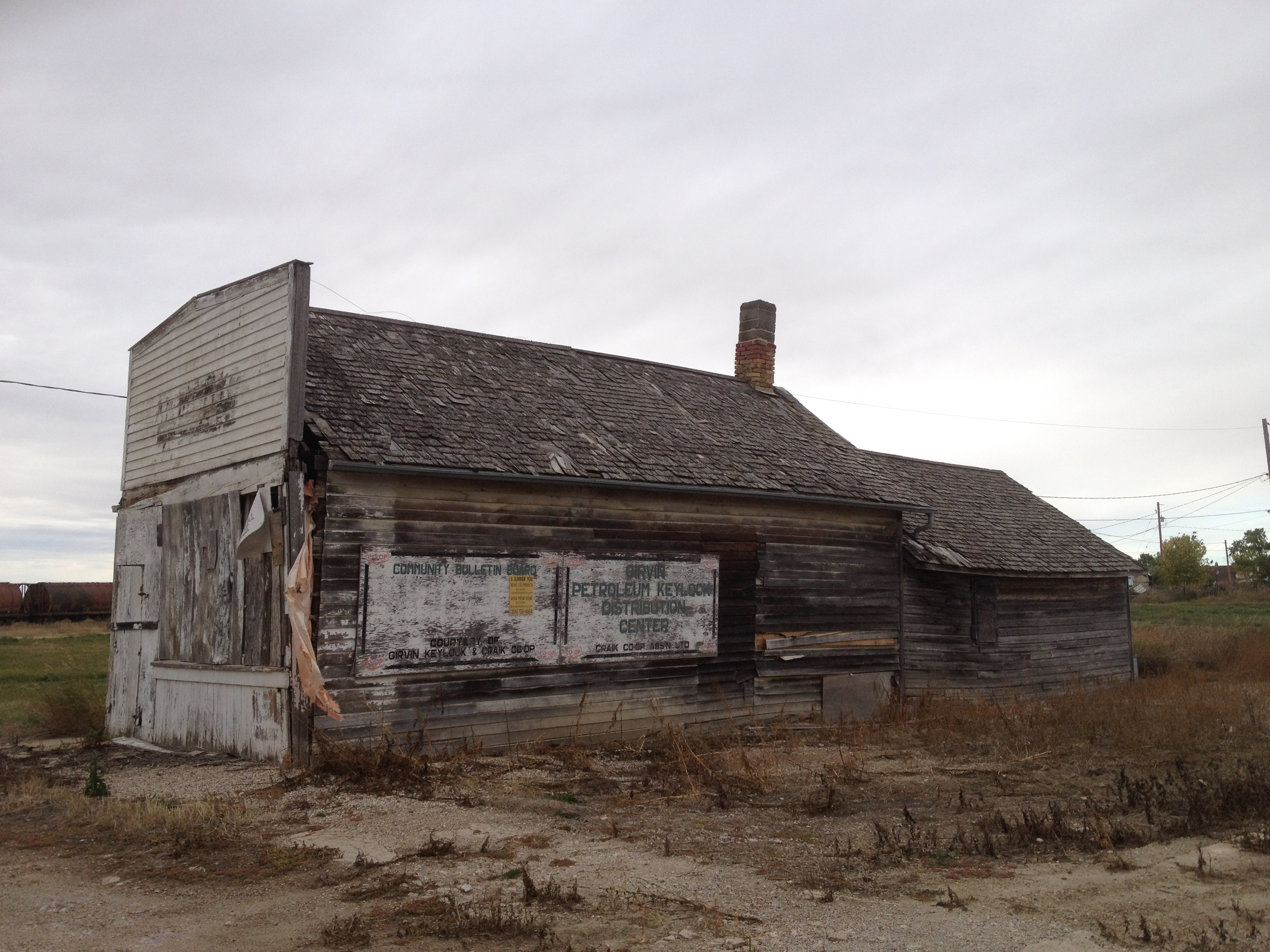

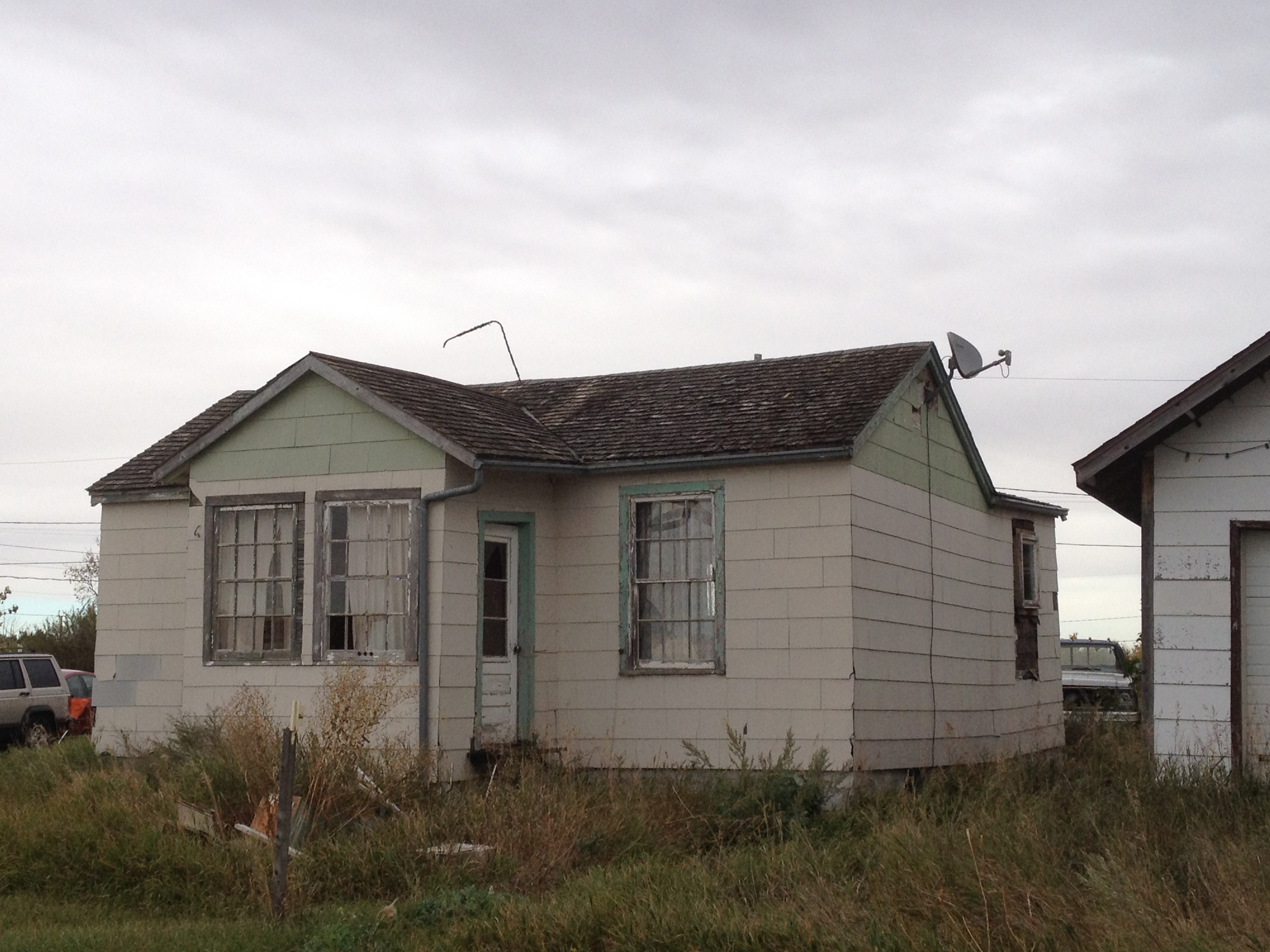

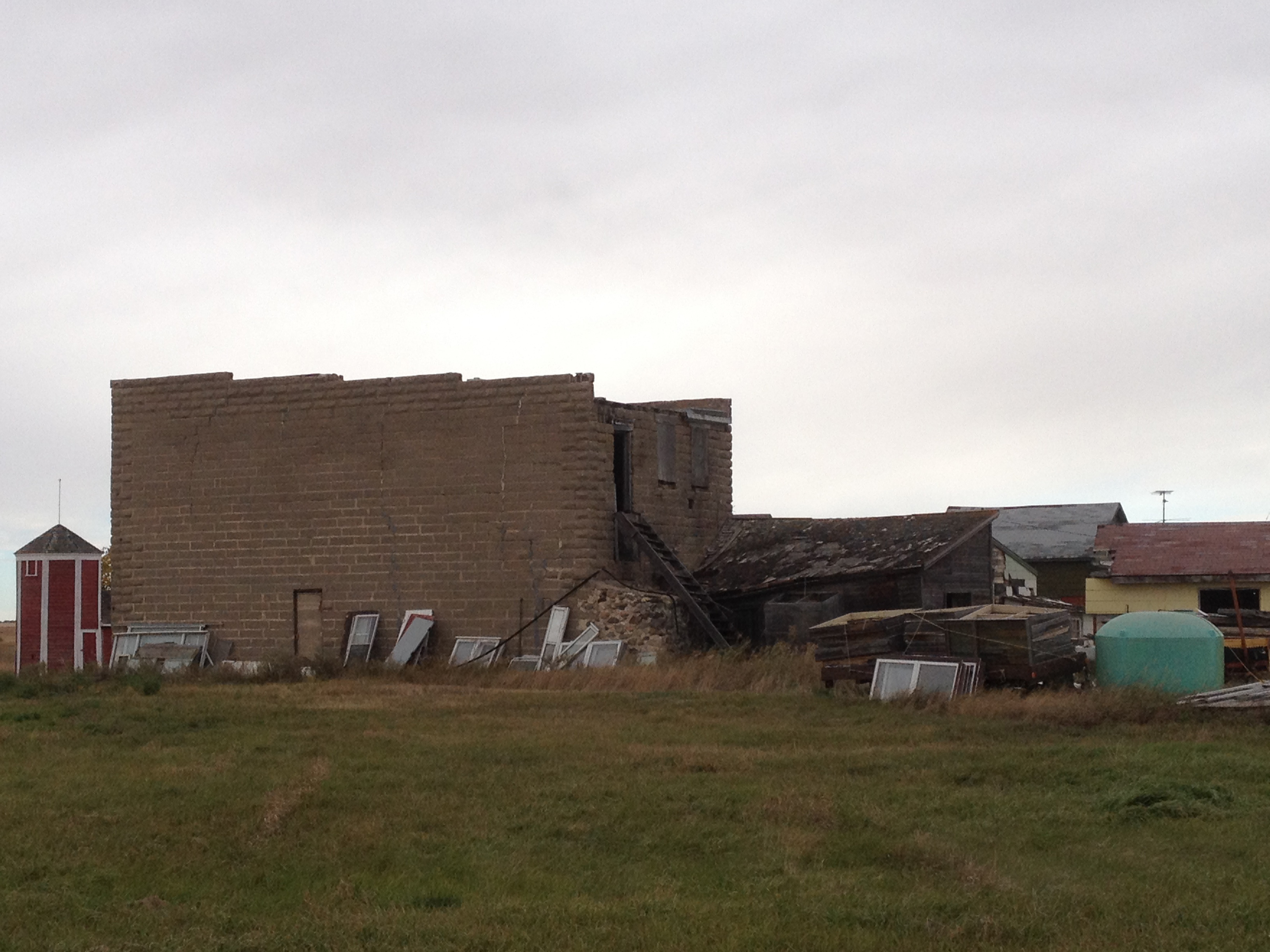

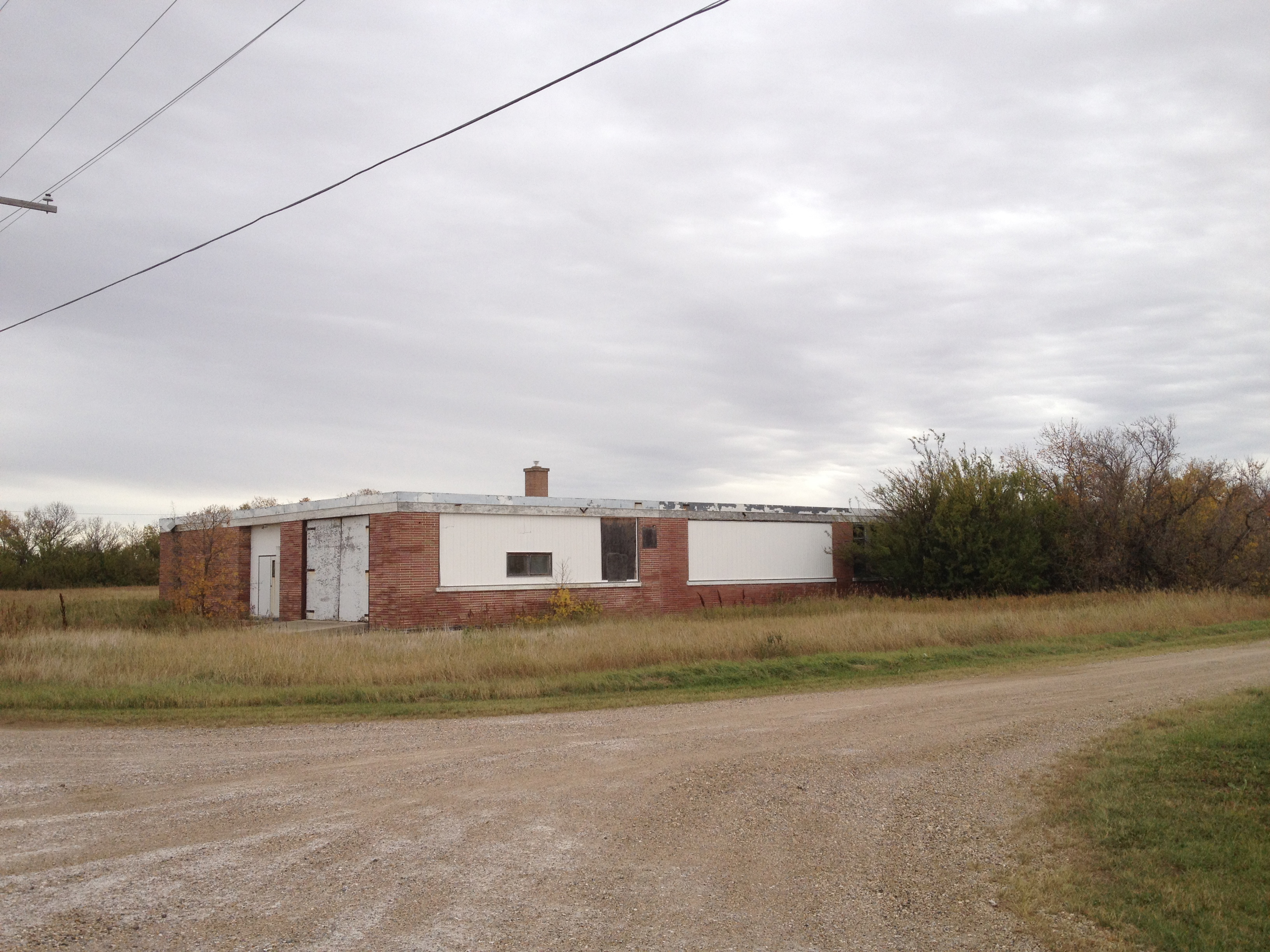

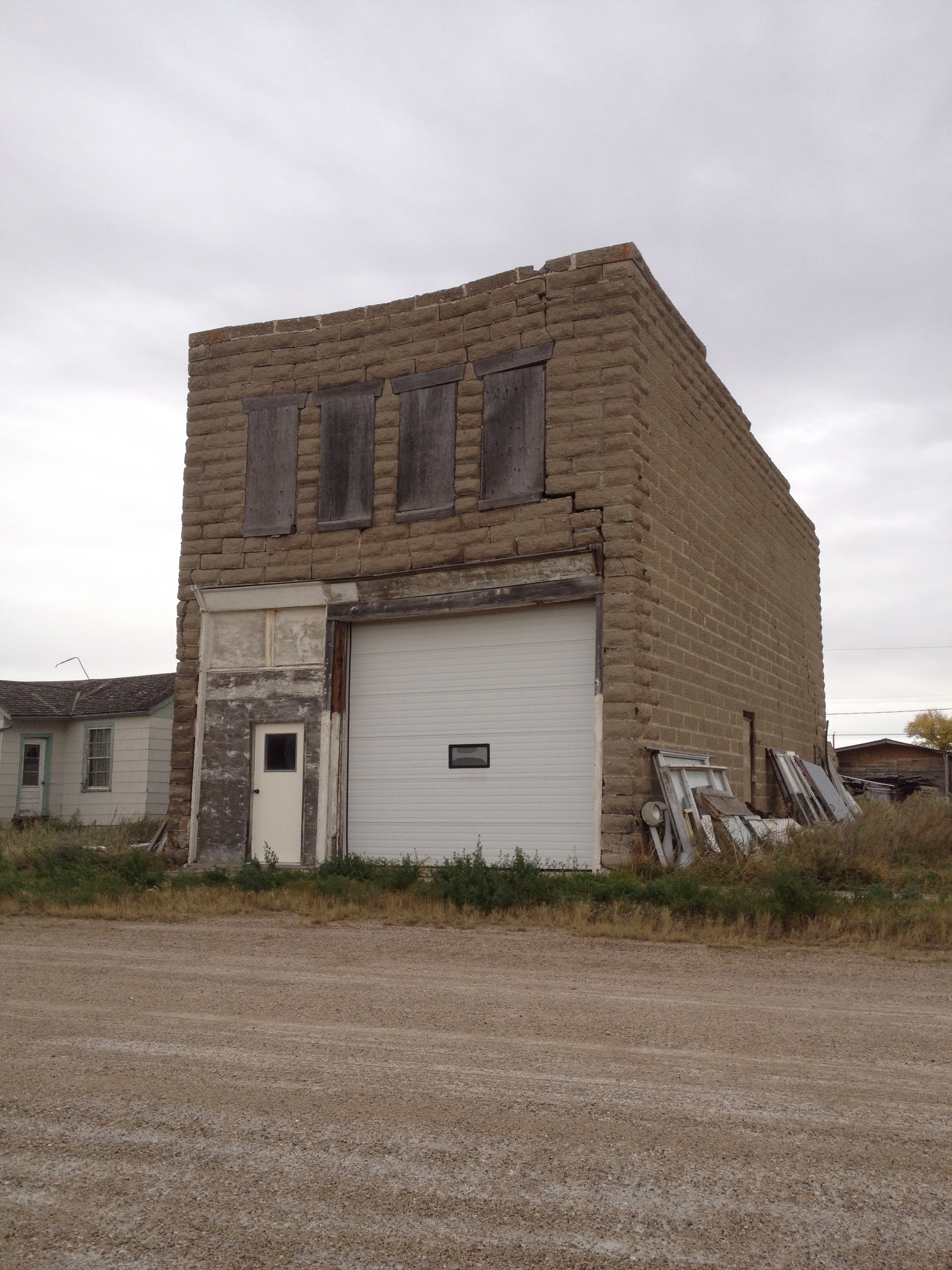

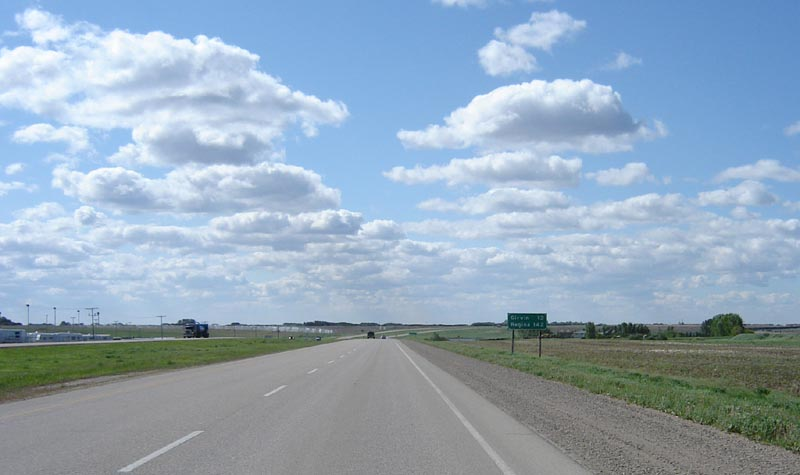
Sign for Girvin on Highway 11

== See also ==
- List of communities in Saskatchewan
- List of hamlets in Saskatchewan
