= Glidden, Saskatchewan =

Community in Saskatchewan, Canada

Coordinates: 51.239°N 109.164°W

Glidden is a hamlet in the Rural Municipality of Newcombe No. 260, Saskatchewan, Canada. In 2001 the community had a population of 40 people. It previously held the status of village until October 19, 2000. The hamlet is about 26 kilometres (16 mi) south of the town of Kindersley at the intersection of Highways 21, 44, and 649.

== History ==
Glidden is named after Charles Glidden (an immigrant from Paw Paw, Michigan) who sold the townsite to the Canadian Pacific Railway. Prior to October 19, 2000, Glidden was incorporated as a village, and was restructured as a hamlet under the jurisdiction of the RM of Newcombe No. 260 on that date.

== See also ==
- List of communities in Saskatchewan
- List of hamlets in Saskatchewan
