= Richlea =

Coordinates: 51°11′08″N 108°35′23″W

Richlea is a hamlet in Snipe Lake Rural Municipality No. 259, Saskatchewan, Canada. It previously held the status of a village until December 31, 1958.

== History ==
Prior to December 31, 1958, Richlea was incorporated as a village, and was restructured as a hamlet under the jurisdiction of the rural municipality of Snipe Lake on that date.

== See also ==
- List of communities in Saskatchewan
- List of hamlets in Saskatchewan
