= Dinsmore, Saskatchewan =

Village in Saskatchewan, Canada

Dinsmore
- Village
- Village of Dinsmore
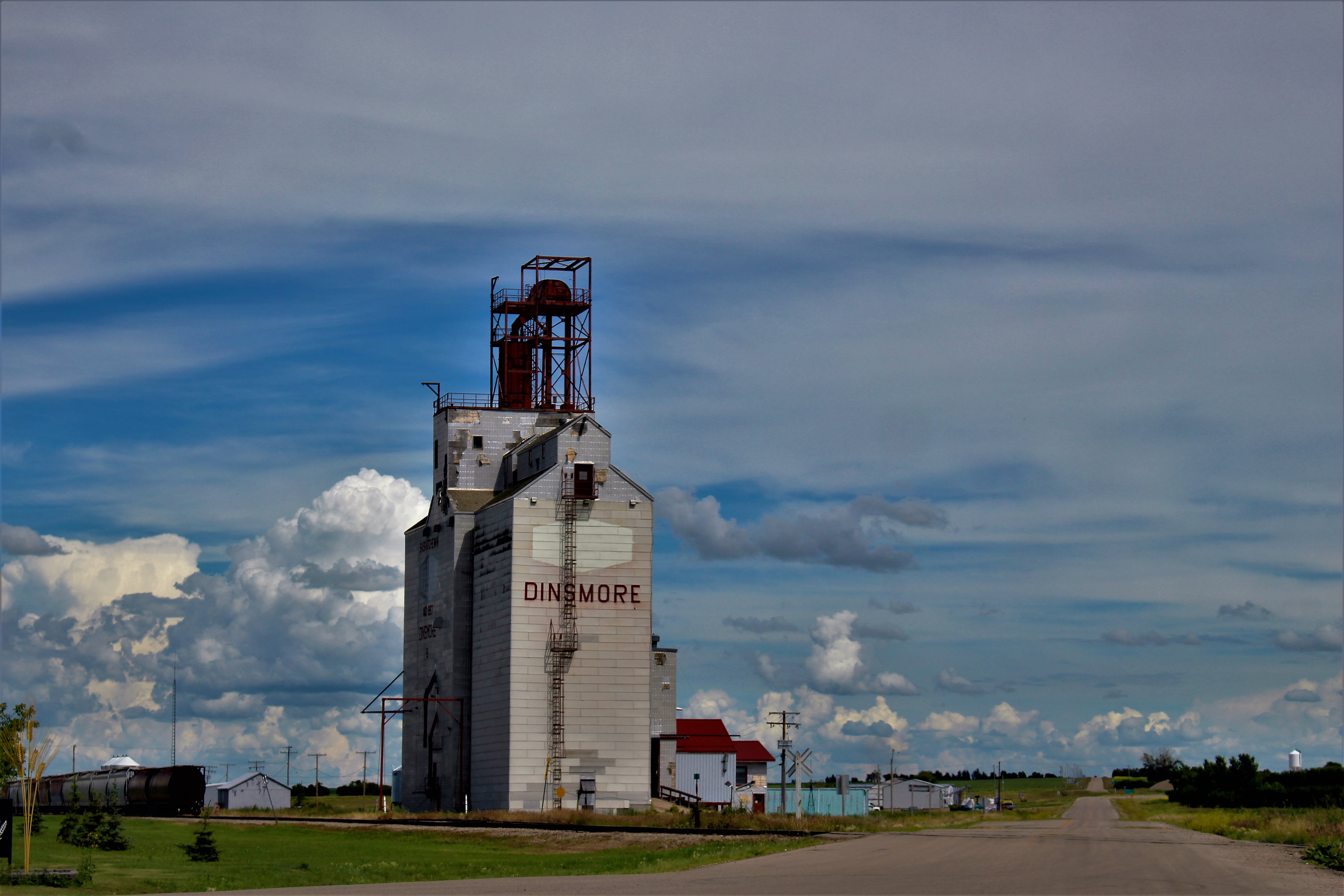
- Grain elevator in Dinsmore
- Motto: Buckle of the wheatbelt
- Location of Dinsmore in Saskatchewan Dinsmore (Canada)
- Coordinates: 51.334°N 107.418°W
- Country: Canada
- Province: Saskatchewan
- Region: Central
- Census division: 12
- Rural municipality: Milden No. 286

Government
  - Type: Municipal
  - Governing body: Dinsmore Village Council
  - Mayor: Harvey Lonsberry
  - Administrator: Kelly Dodd

Area
  - Total: 2.59 km^{2} (1.00 sq mi)

Population (2016)
  - Total: 289
  - Density: 111.5/km^{2} (289/sq mi)
- Time zone: UTC-6 (CST)
- Postal code: S0L 0T0
- Area code: 306
- Highways: Highway 42
- Railways: Canadian Pacific Railway
- Website: Village of Dinsmore

Dinsmore (2016 population: 289) is a village in the Canadian province of Saskatchewan within the Rural Municipality of Milden No. 286 and Census Division No. 12.

== History ==
Dinsmore incorporated as a village on November 3, 1913.

== Demographics ==
Population history (1981–2016)
Year	Pop.	±%
1981	398	—
1986	398	+0.0%
1991	374	−6.0%
1996	328	−12.3%
2001	337	+2.7%
2006	269	−20.2%
2011	318	+18.2%
2016	289	−9.1%
Source: Statistics Canada via Saskatchewan Bureau of Statistics

In the 2021 Canadian census conducted by Statistics Canada, Dinsmore had a population of 267 living in 125 of its 166 total private dwellings, a change of −7.6% from its 2016 population of 289. With a land area of 2.55 km^{2} (0.98 sq mi), it had a population density of 104.7/km^{2} (271.2/sq mi) in 2021.

In the 2016 Canadian census, the Village of Dinsmore recorded a population of 289 living in 132 of its 150 total private dwellings, a 10% decrease from its 2011 population of 318. With a land area of 2.59 km^{2} (1.00 sq mi), it had a population density of 111.6/km^{2} (289.0/sq mi) in 2016.

== See also ==
- List of communities in Saskatchewan
- List of villages in Saskatchewan
- Dinsmore Aerodrome
