= Division No. 12, Saskatchewan =

Census division in Canada

Coordinates: 52°47′24″N 108°17′24″W

Division No. 12
- Census division in Saskatchewan
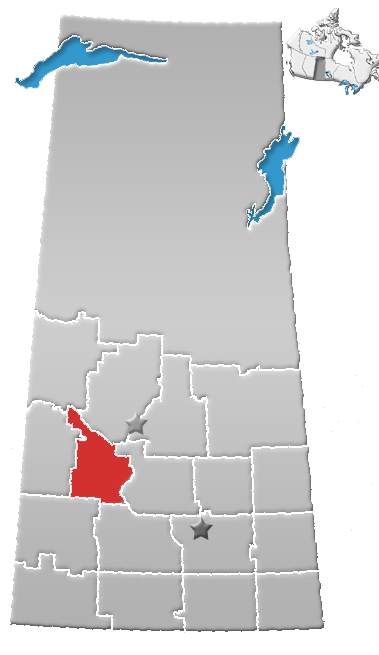
- Country: Canada
- Province: Saskatchewan

Area
  - Total: 13,887.42 km^{2} (5,361.96 sq mi)
- As of 2016

Population (2016)
  - Total: 23,986
  - Density: 1.7272/km^{2} (4.4734/sq mi)

Division No. 12 is one of the eighteen census divisions in the province of Saskatchewan, Canada, as defined by Statistics Canada. It is located in the west-central part of the province. The most populous community in this division is Battleford.

== Demographics ==
In the 2021 Canadian census conducted by Statistics Canada, Division No. 12 had a population of 23,208 living in 9,119 of its 10,216 total private dwellings, a change of −3.2% from its 2016 population of 23,986. With a land area of 13,788.22 km^{2} (5,323.66 sq mi), it had a population density of 1.7/km^{2} (4.4/sq mi) in 2021.

Knowledge of languages in Division No. 12 (1991−2021)
Language	2021		2011		2001		1991	
Language	Pop.	%	Pop.	%	Pop.	%	Pop.	%
English	21,750	99.89%	22,900	99.72%	23,300	99.68%	24,115	99.61%
French	595	2.73%	685	2.98%	865	3.7%	1,030	4.25%
Cree (Note: Combined responses of the Cree-Innu languages, previously categorized under "Cree" in past censuses.)	480	2.2%	560	2.44%	915	3.91%	850	3.51%
Tagalog	350	1.61%	170	0.74%	30	0.13%	0	0%
German (Note: Combined responses of the High German languages, including Standard German, Pennsylvania German, Swiss German, and Yiddish.)	245	1.13%	1,170	5.09%	1,210	5.18%	1,185	4.89%
Ukrainian	165	0.76%	200	0.87%	395	1.69%	590	2.44%
Spanish	165	0.76%	65	0.28%	20	0.09%	15	0.06%
Chinese (Note: Combined responses of the Chinese languages, including Mandarin, Cantonese, Min Nan, Hakka, Wu (Shanghainese), Min Dong, Chinese, n.o.s., and Chinese languages, n.i.e..)	75	0.34%	30	0.13%	65	0.28%	60	0.25%
Dutch	55	0.25%	55	0.24%	85	0.36%	35	0.14%
Hindustani (Note: Combined responses of Hindi and Urdu as they form mutually intelligible registers of the Hindustani language.)	55	0.25%	25	0.11%	25	0.11%	30	0.12%
Russian	40	0.18%	60	0.26%	65	0.28%	175	0.72%
Punjabi	40	0.18%	30	0.13%	0	0%	0	0%
Arabic	25	0.11%	10	0.04%	20	0.09%	0	0%
Polish	15	0.07%	20	0.09%	80	0.34%	90	0.37%
Portuguese	15	0.07%	15	0.07%	20	0.09%	0	0%
Hungarian	15	0.07%	10	0.04%	30	0.13%	0	0%
Italian	10	0.05%	10	0.04%	0	0%	10	0.04%
Greek	10	0.05%	5	0.02%	0	0%	0	0%
Vietnamese	0	0%	5	0.02%	10	0.04%	0	0%
Total responses	21,775	93.83%	22,965	98.87%	23,375	98.64%	24,210	98.73%
Total population	23,208	100%	23,228	100%	23,697	100%	24,521	100%

== Census subdivisions ==
The following census subdivisions (municipalities or municipal equivalents) are located within Saskatchewan's Division No. 12.

=== Towns ===
- Battleford
- Biggar
- Delisle
- Rosetown
- Zealandia

=== Villages ===
- Asquith
- Conquest
- Dinsmore
- Harris
- Kinley
- Macrorie
- Milden
- Perdue
- Tessier
- Vanscoy
- Wiseton

=== Rural municipalities ===
- RM No. 285 Fertile Valley
- RM No. 286 Milden
- RM No. 287 St. Andrews
- RM No. 288 Pleasant Valley
- RM No. 315 Montrose
- RM No. 316 Harris
- RM No. 317 Marriott
- RM No. 318 Mountain View
- RM No. 345 Vanscoy
- RM No. 346 Perdue
- RM No. 347 Biggar
- RM No. 376 Eagle Creek
- RM No. 377 Glenside
- RM No. 378 Rosemount
- RM No. 438 Battle River

=== Indian reserves ===
- Grizzly Bear's Head 110 and Lean Man 111
- Mosquito 109
- Red Pheasant 108
- Sweet Grass 113
- Sweet Grass 113-M16

== See also ==
- List of census divisions of Saskatchewan
- List of communities in Saskatchewan
