= Milden, Saskatchewan =

Community in Saskatchewan, Canada

Milden
- Location within Saskatchewan Location within Canada
- Coordinates: 51.290°N 107.310°W
- Country: Canada
- Province: Saskatchewan
- Region: Southwest
- Census division: 12
- Rural Municipality: Milden No. 286
- Established: 1911

Government
  - Governing body: Milden Village Council
  - Mayor: Travis Inverarity
  - MP: David L. Anderson
  - MLA: Jim Reiter

Area
  - Total: 1.19 km^{2} (0.46 sq mi)

Population (2016)
  - Total: 167
  - Density: 151.6/km^{2} (393/sq mi)
  - Dwellings: 93
- Time zone: CST
- Postal code: S0L 2L0
- Area code: 306
- Highways: Highway 15
- Railways: Canadian Pacific Railway, Abandoned

Milden (2016 population: 167) is a village in the Canadian province of Saskatchewan within the Rural Municipality of Milden No. 286 and Census Division No. 12. The village is at the junction of Highway 15 and Highway 655, approximately 20 kilometres (12 mi) west of Outlook.

== History ==
Milden incorporated as a village on July 20, 1911.

== Demographics ==
Population history (1981–2021)
Year	Pop.	±%
1981	251	—
1986	265	+5.6%
1991	228	−14.0%
1996	208	−8.8%
2001	196	−5.8%
2006	172	−12.2%
2011	181	+5.2%
2016	167	−7.7%
2021	153	−8.4%
Source: Statistics Canada via Saskatchewan Bureau of Statistics

In the 2021 Census of Population conducted by Statistics Canada, Milden had a population of 153 living in 80 of its 111 total private dwellings, a change of −8.4% from its 2016 population of 167. With a land area of 0.96 km^{2} (0.37 sq mi), it had a population density of 159.4/km^{2} (412.8/sq mi) in 2021.

In the 2016 Census of Population, the Village of Milden recorded a population of 167 living in 92 of its 112 total private dwellings, a −8.4% change from its 2011 population of 181. With a land area of 1.19 km^{2} (0.46 sq mi), it had a population density of 140.3/km^{2} (363.5/sq mi) in 2016.

== Economy ==
Local businesses include a Petro-Canada pipeline construction facility.

== Notable people ==
- Geoff Dolan (Canadian Strongman)

== See also ==
- List of communities in Saskatchewan
- List of francophone communities in Saskatchewan
- List of villages in Saskatchewan
