= Eston, Saskatchewan =

Town in Saskatchewan, Canada

- Town
- Location within Saskatchewan
- Coordinates: 51.0904°N 108.4509°W
- Country: Canada
- Province: Saskatchewan
- Census division: 12
- Rural Municipality: Snipe Lake

Government
  - Governing body: Eston Town Council

Area
  - Total: 2.72 km^{2} (1.05 sq mi)

Population (2016)
  - Total: ~761
  - Density: 390.3/km^{2} (1,011/sq mi)
- Time zone: CST
- Area code: 306
- Highways: Highway 30; Highway 44
- Railways: Canadian National Railway
- Website: Official Website - Town of Eston

Eston is a town in the Rural Municipality of Snipe Lake No. 259, Saskatchewan, Canada. The population was 1,061 at the 2016 Census. The town is located at the junction of Highway 30 and Highway 44, approximately 70 kilometres (43 mi) south-east of Kindersley. Eston Riverside Regional Park is 21 kilometres (13 mi) south of town on the north bank of the South Saskatchewan River.

== Demographics ==
In the 2021 Census of Population conducted by Statistics Canada, Eston had a population of 972 living in 426 of its 492 total private dwellings, a change of −8.4% from its 2016 population of 1,061. With a land area of 2.65 km^{2} (1.02 sq mi), it had a population density of 366.8/km^{2} (950.0/sq mi) in 2021.

== Climate ==
Eston experiences a semi-arid climate (Köppen climate classification BSk) with long, cold, dry winters and short but very warm summers. Precipitation is very low, with an annual average of 297mm, and is heavily concentrated in the warmer months.

The town experienced "severe damage" to buildings as a result of plough winds during a severe thunderstorm on July 14, 2019.

Climate data for Eston
Month	Jan	Feb	Mar	Apr	May	Jun	Jul	Aug	Sep	Oct	Nov	Dec	Year
Record high °C (°F)	9.5 (49.1)	13.5 (56.3)	20.5 (68.9)	32.5 (90.5)	36.1 (97.0)	39.5 (103.1)	39 (102)	38.9 (102.0)	36.7 (98.1)	32.2 (90.0)	21.7 (71.1)	11.7 (53.1)	39.5 (103.1)
Mean daily maximum °C (°F)	−9.5 (14.9)	−6.5 (20.3)	1.5 (34.7)	11.8 (53.2)	19.3 (66.7)	23.5 (74.3)	25.6 (78.1)	25 (77)	18.7 (65.7)	11.7 (53.1)	−0.5 (31.1)	−7.7 (18.1)	9.4 (48.9)
Daily mean °C (°F)	−14.3 (6.3)	−11.5 (11.3)	−4 (25)	4.8 (40.6)	11.7 (53.1)	16.2 (61.2)	18.1 (64.6)	17.4 (63.3)	11.4 (52.5)	4.9 (40.8)	−5.6 (21.9)	−12.5 (9.5)	3 (37)
Mean daily minimum °C (°F)	−19.1 (−2.4)	−16.5 (2.3)	−9.5 (14.9)	−2.2 (28.0)	4 (39)	8.8 (47.8)	10.5 (50.9)	9.7 (49.5)	4 (39)	−2 (28)	−10.7 (12.7)	−17.3 (0.9)	−3.4 (25.9)
Record low °C (°F)	−47.8 (−54.0)	−40.5 (−40.9)	−40.6 (−41.1)	−28.6 (−19.5)	−11.1 (12.0)	−4.4 (24.1)	−1.1 (30.0)	−2.8 (27.0)	−10.6 (12.9)	−26 (−15)	−35 (−31)	−43.9 (−47.0)	−47.8 (−54.0)
Average precipitation mm (inches)	13 (0.5)	9.5 (0.37)	14.8 (0.58)	19.5 (0.77)	37.8 (1.49)	53.2 (2.09)	53.1 (2.09)	39.3 (1.55)	20.3 (0.80)	11 (0.4)	11.1 (0.44)	14.6 (0.57)	297.2 (11.70)
Source: Environment Canada

== Notable people ==
- Michael Helm, author
- Robert Steadward, founder of the International Paralympic Committee

== See also ==
- List of towns in Saskatchewan
- List of communities in Saskatchewan
- Eston Airport
