= Eatonia =

Town in Saskatchewan, Canada

- Town of Eatonia
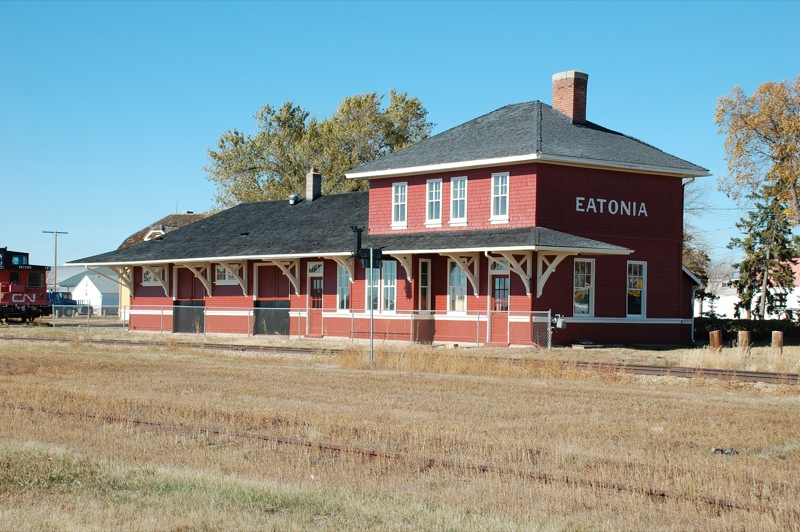
- Former Canadian National Railway station in Eatonia

- Location within Chesterfield No. 261 Location within Saskatchewan
- Coordinates: 51°13′16″N 109°23′26″W
- Country: Canada
- Province: Saskatchewan
- Census division: 8
- Rural Municipality: Chesterfield
- Founded: 1919
- Incorporated: 1954

Government
  - Mayor: Darcy Scott
  - Administrator: Victoria Munroe
  - Governing body: Eatonia Town Council

Area
  - Total: 1.68 km^{2} (0.65 sq mi)
- Elevation: 719.6 m (2,361 ft)

Population (2006)
  - Total: 449
  - Density: 266.6/km^{2} (690/sq mi)
- Time zone: CST
- Postal code: S0L 0Y0
- Area code: 306
- Highways: 21 and 44
- Airport: Eatonia (Elvie Smith) Municipal
- Website: eatonia.ca

Eatonia is a town in the Canadian province of Saskatchewan with a population of 449 people (according to the Canada 2006 Census). The town's economy is based almost exclusively on agriculture. Eatonia is in southwest Saskatchewan at the crossroads of Highways 21 and 44, approximately 44 kilometres southwest of Kindersley and 72 kilometres from the provincial boundary with Alberta. The town is served by Eatonia (Elvie Smith) Municipal Airport.

== History ==
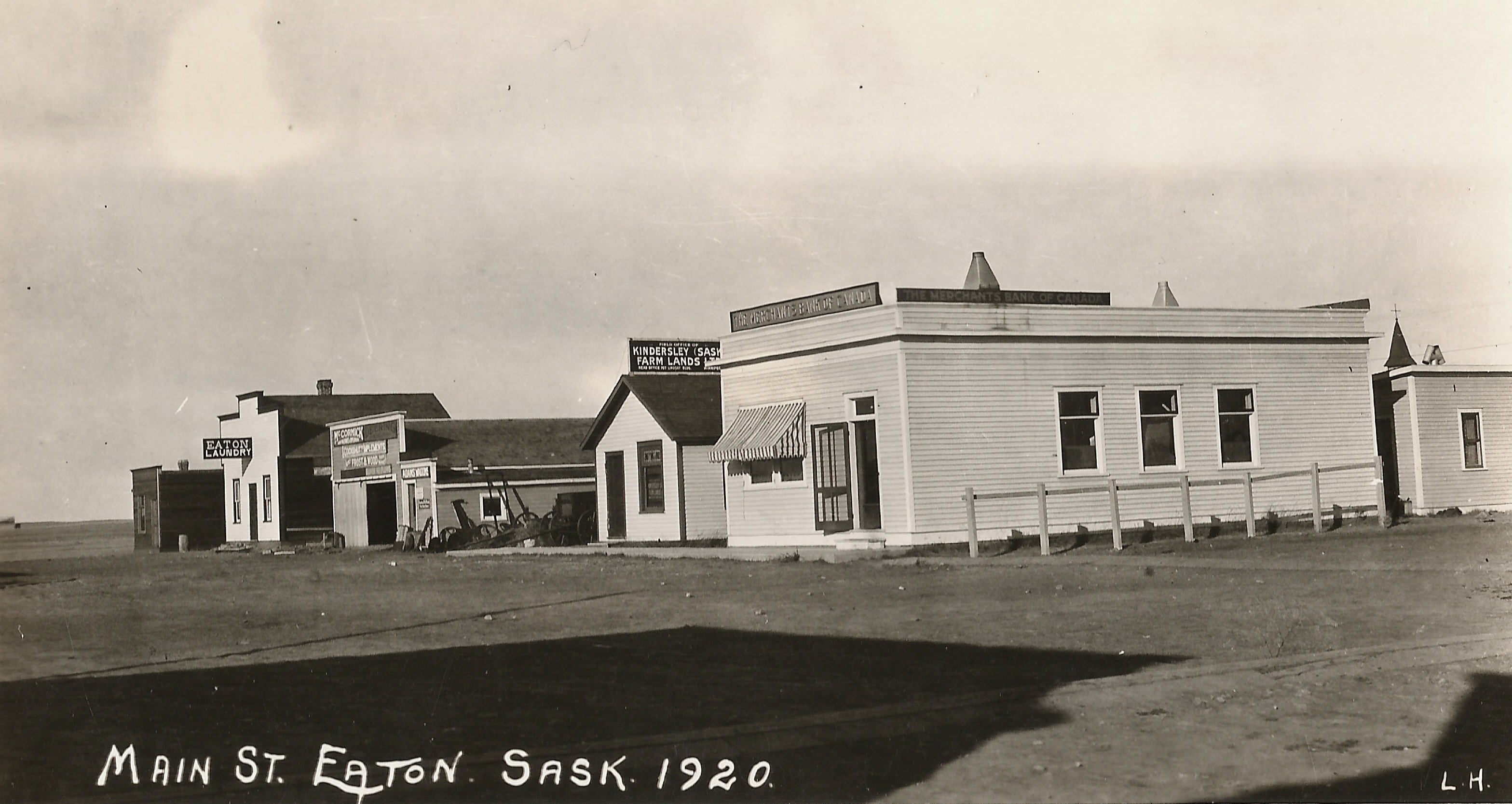
The town of Eaton, later Eatonia, in 1920

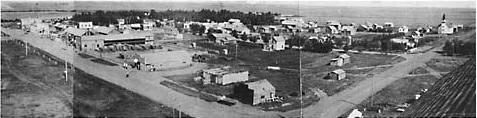
Eatonia in 1935

Eatonia was founded in 1919 as a station on the Canadian National Railway and was named after Timothy Eaton, founder of the Eaton's department store chain and catalogue, and to honour his son and heir, John Craig Eaton. The station was originally simply called "Eaton", but there was confusion with nearby Eston, so the name was changed to Eatonia in 1921 ("Eatonia" was the name of an Eaton's brand for clothing and other goods, and "Eatonian" was the name given to long-serving Eaton's employees).

Eatonia was incorporated as a town in 1954. In 1955, the year of Saskatchewan's Golden Jubilee, Eatonia's train station was featured on the cover of the Eaton's catalogue, thus resulting in a classic local image finding its way into homes across the country. The former CN train station is now home to the Wheatland Regional Library (Eatonia Branch). The former station, along with a train caboose and a wood-frame house ordered from the Eaton's catalogue in 1917, comprise the Eatonia Heritage Park, a 0.6-hectare (1.5-acre) Municipal Heritage Property located at the south end of Main Street.

== Demographics ==
In the 2021 Census of Population conducted by Statistics Canada, Eatonia had a population of 498 living in 205 of its 253 total private dwellings, a change of −5% from its 2016 population of 524. With a land area of 1.6 km^{2} (0.62 sq mi), it had a population density of 311.3/km^{2} (806.1/sq mi) in 2021.

Canada census – Eatonia community profile

	2021	2011
Population	498 (-5.0% from 2016)	508 (13.1% from 2006)
Land area	1.60 km^{2} (0.62 sq mi)	1.68 km^{2} (0.65 sq mi)
Population density	311.6/km^{2} (807/sq mi)	301.6/km^{2} (781/sq mi)
Median age	39.2 (M: 37.6, F: 42.8)	44.5 (M: 41.8, F: 45.3)
Private dwellings	253 (total) 205 (occupied)	239 (total)
Median household income	$83,000

References: 2021 2011

== Education ==
Eatonia is home to a kindergarten to Grade 12 public school, Eaton School. Eaton School has been home to many successful volleyball, basketball, and football teams throughout its history. It is located within the Sun West School Division. Eaton School has sport teams which include (but are not limited to) senior football, volley ball (senior boys, senior girls, junior boys, junior girls), cross country, track and field, etcetera.

== See also ==
- List of towns in Saskatchewan
