= Rural Municipality of Arm River No. 252 =

Rural municipality in Saskatchewan, Canada

Arm River No. 252 Girvin No. 252 (1909–1912)
- Rural municipality
- Rural Municipality of Arm River No. 252
- Location of the RM of Arm River No. 252 in Saskatchewan
- Coordinates: 51.224°N 105.824°W
- Country: Canada
- Province: Saskatchewan
- Census division: 11
- SARM division: 5
- Formed: December 13, 1909
- Name change: June 29, 1912 (from RM of Girvin No. 252)

Government
  - Reeve: Wayne Obrigewitsch
  - Governing body: RM of Arm River No. 252 Council
  - Administrator: Yvonne (Bonny) Goodsman
  - Office location: Davidson

Area (2016)
  - Land: 725.3 km^{2} (280.0 sq mi)

Population (2016)
  - Total: 250
  - Density: 0.3/km^{2} (0.78/sq mi)
- Time zone: CST
  - Summer (DST): CST
- Area codes: 306 and 639
- Website: Official website

The Rural Municipality of Arm River No. 252 (2016 population: 250) is a rural municipality (RM) in the Canadian province of Saskatchewan within Census Division No. 11 and SARM Division No. 5. It is located along Highway 11 between Saskatoon and Regina.

== History ==
The RM of Girvin No. 252 was originally incorporated as a rural municipality on December 13, 1909. Its name was changed to the RM of Arm River No. 252 on June 29, 1912.

== Geography ==
=== Communities and localities ===
The following urban municipalities are surrounded by the RM.

Towns

- Davidson

The following unincorporated communities are within the RM.

Localities

- Girvin (dissolved as a village, December 19, 2005)

== Demographics ==
Population history (1981–2016)
Year	Pop.	±%
1981	392	—
1986	374	−4.6%
1991	335	−10.4%
1996	304	−9.3%
2001	271	−10.9%
2006	240	−11.4%
2011	249	+3.8%
2016	250	+0.4%
Source: Statistics Canada via Saskatchewan Bureau of Statistics

In the 2021 Census of Population conducted by Statistics Canada, the RM of Arm River No. 252 had a population of 258 living in 100 of its 117 total private dwellings, a change of 3.2% from its 2016 population of 250. With a land area of 721.58 km^{2} (278.60 sq mi), it had a population density of 0.4/km^{2} (0.9/sq mi) in 2021.

In the 2016 Census of Population, the RM of Arm River No. 252 recorded a population of 250 living in 98 of its 109 total private dwellings, a 0.4% change from its 2011 population of 249. With a land area of 725.3 km^{2} (280.0 sq mi), it had a population density of 0.3/km^{2} (0.9/sq mi) in 2016.

== Government ==
The RM of Arm River No. 252 is governed by an elected municipal council and an appointed administrator that meets on the second Tuesday of every month. The reeve of the RM is Wayne Obrigewitsch while its administrator is Yvonne (Bonny) Goodsman. The RM's office is located in Davidson.

== Transportation ==
Rail

- Regina Branch C.N.R—serves Bethune, Findlater, Chamberlain, Aylesbury, Craik, Girvin, Davidson, Bladworth, Kenaston, Strong

Roads

- Highway 11—serves Girvin, Saskatchewan and Davidson, Saskatchewan
- Highway 747—serves Davidson, Saskatchewan East-west
- Highway 653—serves Davidson, Saskatchewan
- Highway 749—serves Girvin, Saskatchewan

== See also ==
- List of rural municipalities in Saskatchewan
