= Davidson, Saskatchewan =

Town in Saskatchewan, Canada

Davidson
- Town
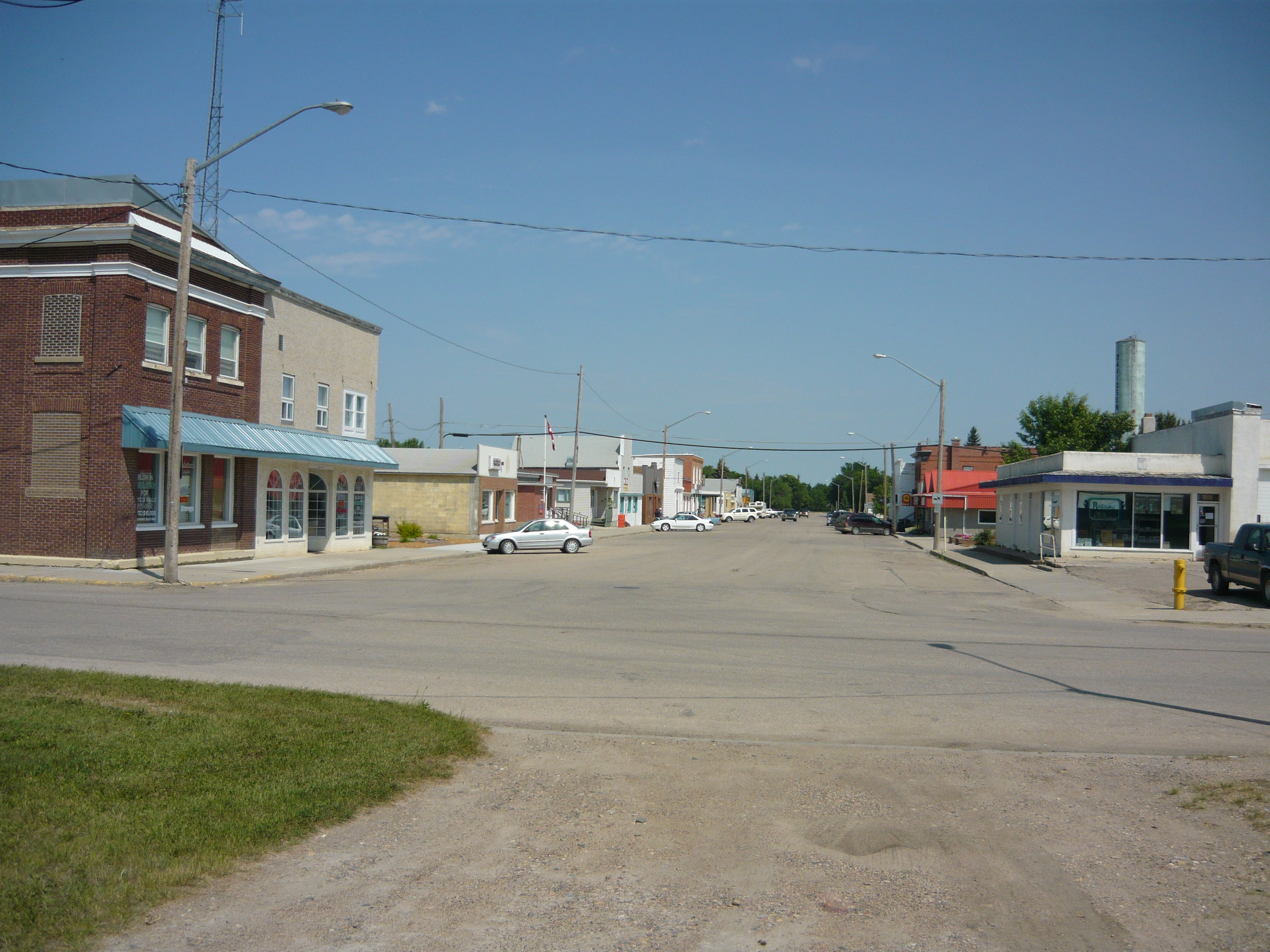
- Davidson's business district Washington Avenue
- Nickname: Community In Motion
- Location of Davidson in Saskatchewan Davidson (Canada)
- Coordinates: 51.16°N 105.58°W
- Country: Canada
- Province: Saskatchewan
- Census division: No. 11
- Rural Municipality: Arm River No. 252
- Post Office established: 1903
- Village Incorporated: March 7, 1904
- Town Incorporated: November 15, 1906

Government
  - Mayor: Eli Lichtenwald
  - Governing body: Davidson Town Council

Area
  - Land: 4.49 km^{2} (1.73 sq mi)

Population (2011)
  - Total: 1,025
  - Density: 228.4/km^{2} (592/sq mi)
- Time zone: CST
- Postal code: S0G 1A0
- Area code: 306
- Highways: Highway 11 (Louis Riel Trail) / Highway 44 / Highway 653 / Highway 747
- Waterways: Lake Diefenbaker; Last Mountain Lake
- Website: Official website

Davidson is a town in south central Saskatchewan, Canada. It is 104 kilometres (65 mi) south-east of Saskatoon beside provincial highway 11 as well as Highway 44, in the Rural Municipality of Arm River No. 252. Approximately halfway between Saskatoon and Regina, it is a popular stopping point with many restaurants and gas stations located adjacent to the highway.

== History ==
In 1902 Colonel Andrew Duncan Davidson, an enthusiastic entrepreneur from Glencoe, Ontario, came to Saskatchewan in hopes of creating a 'midway' settlement between the cities of Regina and Saskatoon. With agriculture as one of his driving passions, Davidson, through the Saskatchewan Valley Land Company, purchased 700,000 acres (280,000 ha) from the railway and the federal government in an area where the soil was particularly suitable for grain farming. Davidson organized a train route that travelled from Chicago to Saskatoon; making one stop in Davidson on the way. This train route brought American bankers, entrepreneurs and newspapermen in hopes of starting up new businesses in the area. With the expansion of the community underway, Davidson also managed to sell more than 180,000 acres (73,000 ha) of land in the area.

Within a short period of time, Davidson, which was declared the name of the community, was nicknamed the 'Midway Town' because of its central location. On 15 November 1906, Davidson was officially declared a town.

During World War II the Royal Canadian Air Force built and operated RCAF Station Davidson as a component of the British Commonwealth Air Training Plan. The station was constructed on a site 7 kilometres (4.3 mi) east of the town. This site should not be confused with Davidson Municipal Airport which is adjacent to the town, on the south end.

== Geography ==
=== Climate ===
Climate data for Davidson
Month	Jan	Feb	Mar	Apr	May	Jun	Jul	Aug	Sep	Oct	Nov	Dec	Year
Record high °C (°F)	9.4 (48.9)	14.4 (57.9)	20 (68)	32.2 (90.0)	38 (100)	42.2 (108.0)	38.9 (102.0)	40.6 (105.1)	37.2 (99.0)	31.7 (89.1)	22.2 (72.0)	15.6 (60.1)	42.2 (108.0)
Mean daily maximum °C (°F)	−11.5 (11.3)	−7.5 (18.5)	−1.2 (29.8)	10 (50)	18.1 (64.6)	22.4 (72.3)	25.3 (77.5)	24.9 (76.8)	18 (64)	10.6 (51.1)	−1.2 (29.8)	−9.1 (15.6)	8.2 (46.8)
Daily mean °C (°F)	−16.8 (1.8)	−12.9 (8.8)	−6.5 (20.3)	3.7 (38.7)	11 (52)	15.5 (59.9)	18 (64)	17.3 (63.1)	11.1 (52.0)	4.3 (39.7)	−6.2 (20.8)	−14.2 (6.4)	2 (36)
Mean daily minimum °C (°F)	−22 (−8)	−18.2 (−0.8)	−11.7 (10.9)	−2.5 (27.5)	3.8 (38.8)	8.5 (47.3)	10.7 (51.3)	9.6 (49.3)	4.1 (39.4)	−2 (28)	−11.1 (12.0)	−19.3 (−2.7)	−4.2 (24.4)
Record low °C (°F)	−46.7 (−52.1)	−43.9 (−47.0)	−40 (−40)	−28.9 (−20.0)	−10 (14)	−5.5 (22.1)	1.7 (35.1)	−2.2 (28.0)	−15 (5)	−27 (−17)	−35 (−31)	−43 (−45)	−46.7 (−52.1)
Average precipitation mm (inches)	17.2 (0.68)	12.1 (0.48)	16.9 (0.67)	17.9 (0.70)	46.9 (1.85)	67 (2.6)	58.8 (2.31)	40.5 (1.59)	37.9 (1.49)	18.4 (0.72)	12.2 (0.48)	19.8 (0.78)	365.6 (14.39)
Source: Environment Canada

== Demographics ==
In the 2021 Census of Population conducted by Statistics Canada, Davidson had a population of 1,044 living in 466 of its 524 total private dwellings, a change of −0.4% from its 2016 population of 1,048. With a land area of 4.05 km^{2} (1.56 sq mi), it had a population density of 257.8/km^{2} (667.6/sq mi) in 2021.

Canada census – Davidson community profile

	2021	2011
Population	1,044 (-0.4% from 2016)	1,025 (7.0% from 2006)
Land area	4.05 km^{2} (1.56 sq mi)	4.49 km^{2} (1.73 sq mi)
Population density	257.7/km^{2} (667/sq mi)	228.4/km^{2} (592/sq mi)
Median age	43.6 (M: 41.6, F: 46.8)	47.4 (M: 44.5, F: 49.9)
Private dwellings	524 (total) 466 (occupied)	517 (total)
Median household income	$70,000

References: 2021 2011

== Sports and recreation ==
Hockey, baseball, fitness, curling, figure skating, dance, gymnastics, and riding are some of the activities offered to members of the community. The Davidson Cyclones of the Saskatchewan Valley Hockey League play at the Davidson AGT Centre.

Davidson is home to the 9-hole grass green, Davidson Golf and Country Club.

The swimming pool beside the local campground offers swimming lessons.

== Gallery ==
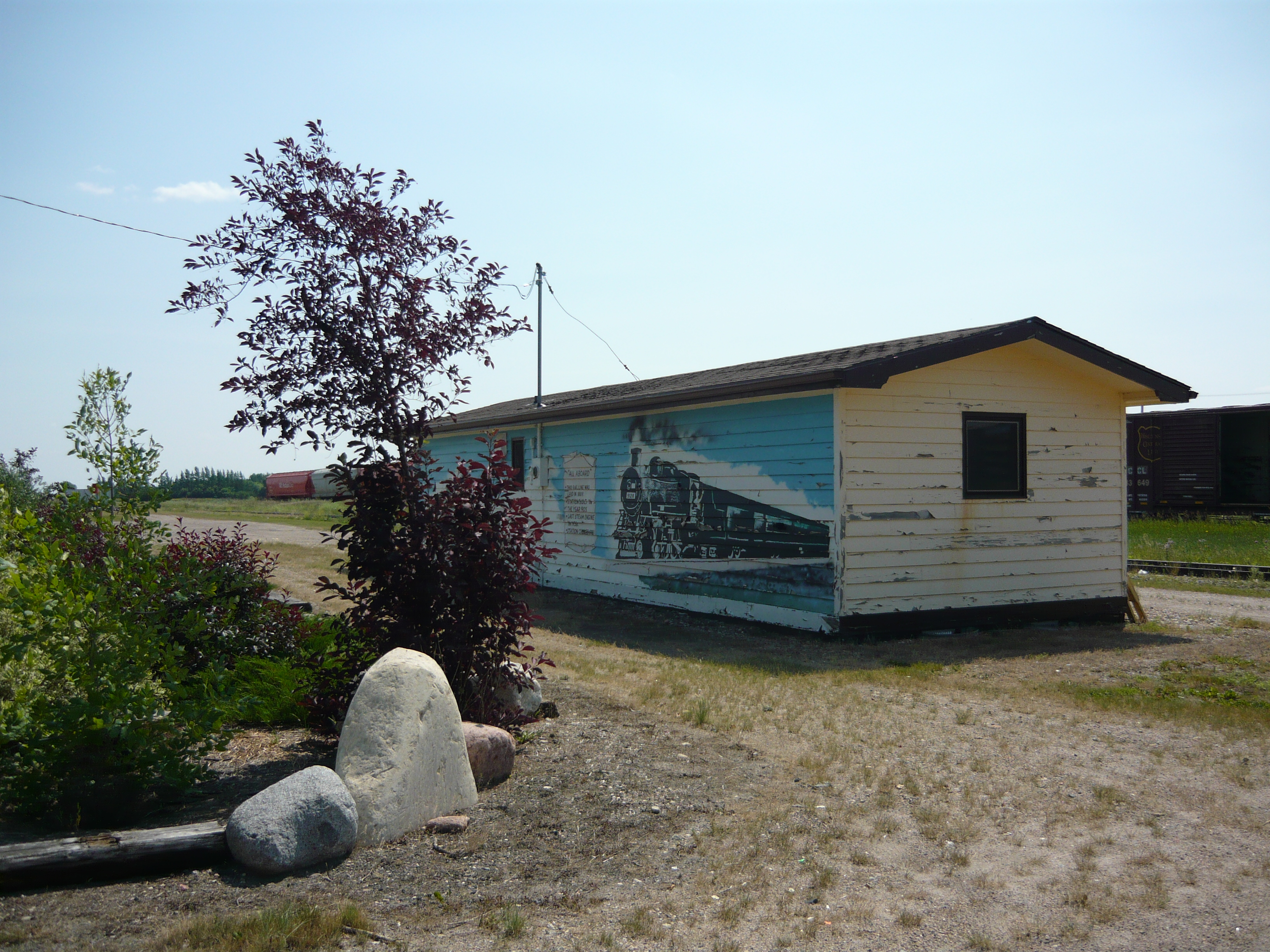
Train station

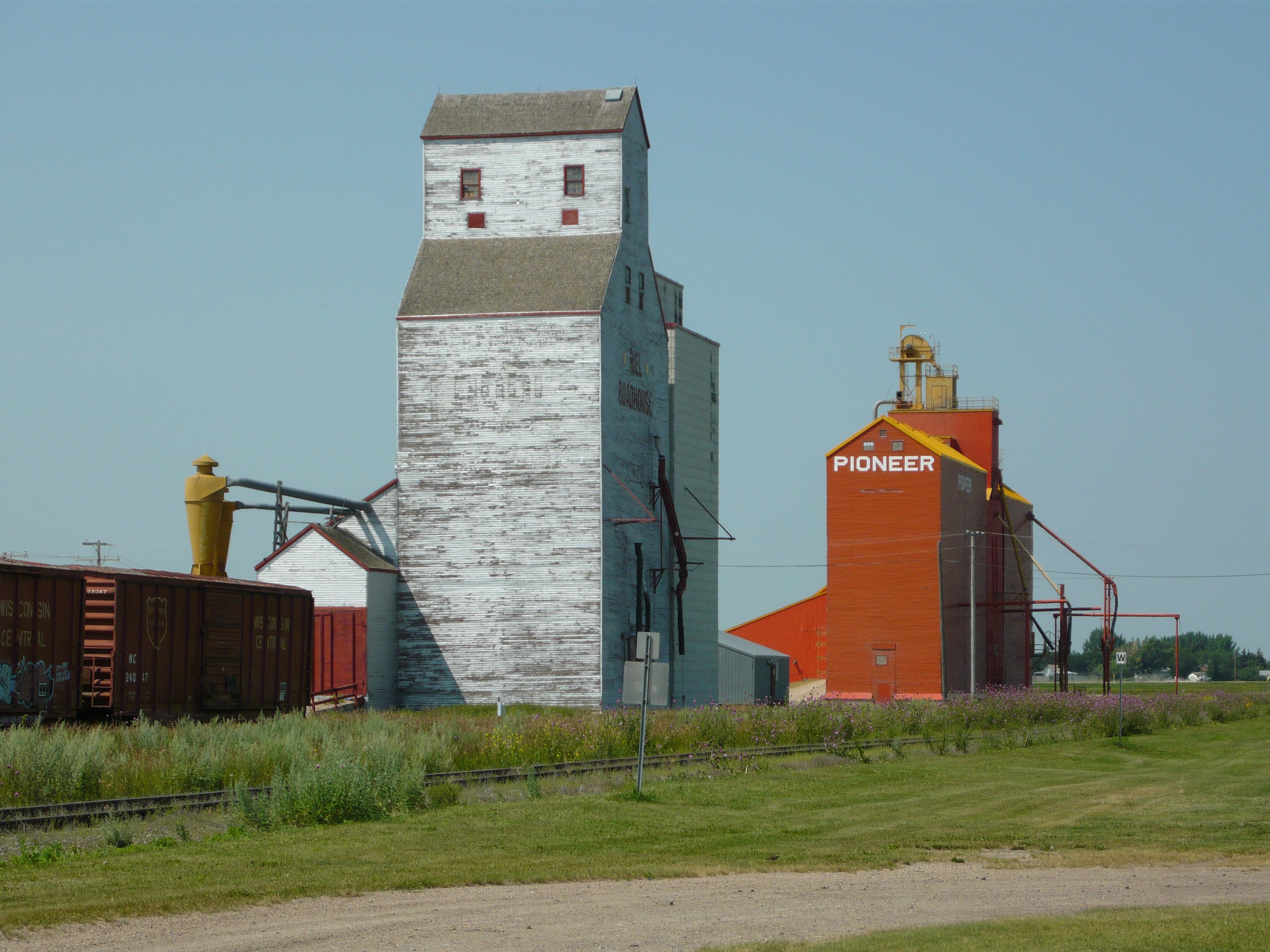
Grain elevators

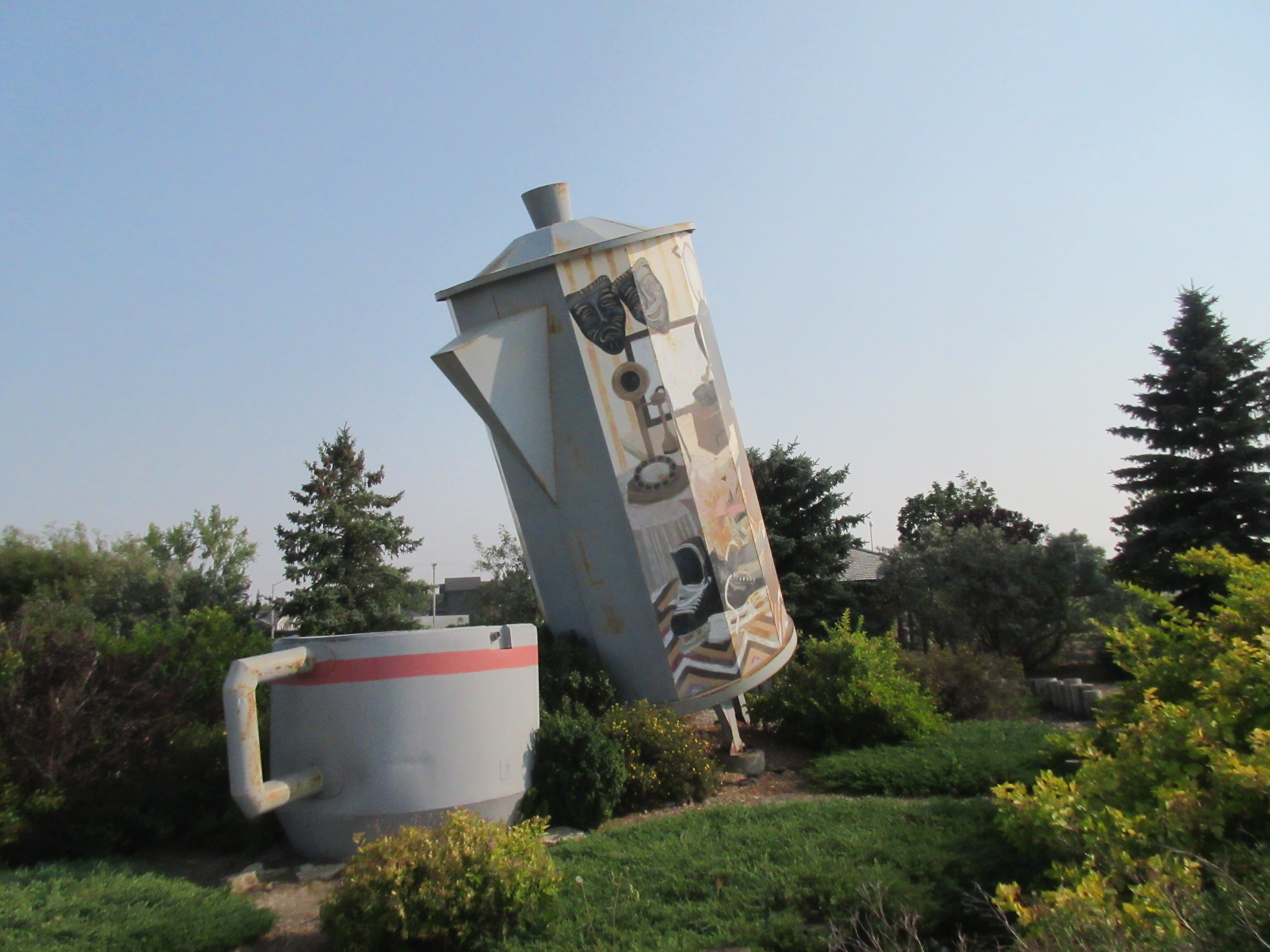
Coffee pot monument in Davidson, Saskatchewan. Approximately 24 feet tall, and would hold 150,000 cups of coffee — claimed to be the world's largest. Erected in 1996, and featured on a Canadian postage stamp in 2010, the town is now considering renovation of the monument.

== Education ==
Davidson Elementary School and Davidson High School are part of the Sun West School Division.

== Notable residents ==
- Murad Al-Katib, president and CEO of AGT Food and Ingredients
- Nolan Allan, NHL hockey player for the San Jose Sharks
- Gay Caswell, writer and provincial politician
- Lee Clark, federal politician
- Cory Sarich, Retired NHL player
- Duncan Selby Hutcheon, provincial politician
- Cliff Shaw, Retired CFL player for the Saskatchewan Roughriders
- Wayne Shaw, Retired CFL player for the Saskatchewan Roughriders
- Brayden McNabb, NHL hockey player for the Vegas Golden Knights
- Robert Gordon Robertson, Commissioner of the Northwest Territories

== Media ==
The community newspaper is The Davidson Leader, publishing since 1904.

== See also ==
- List of communities in Saskatchewan
- List of towns in Saskatchewan
