= Isham, Saskatchewan =

- unincorporated community
- Location within Saskatchewan
- Country: Canada
- Province: Saskatchewan
- Region: Southwest
- Census division: 8
- Time zone: CST
- Area code: 306

Isham is an unincorporated community in the Canadian province of Saskatchewan.
