= Great Sandhills Railway =

Canadian short line railway company

Overview
- Parent company: Regional Rail, LLC
- Headquarters: Leader, Saskatchewan
- Reporting mark: GSR
- Locale: Saskatchewan, Alberta, Canada
- Dates of operation: 2009–Present
- Predecessor: Canadian Pacific Railway

Technical
- Track gauge: 4 ft 8 1/2 in (1,435 mm) standard gauge
- Length: 198 kilometres (123 mi)

Other
- Website: www.gsrail.net

The Great Sandhills Railway (reporting mark GSR) is a Canadian short line railway company that operates 198 kilometres (123 mi) of track west of Swift Current, Saskatchewan in the provinces of Saskatchewan and Alberta.

The railway began operations on March 14, 2009. Great Sandhills Railway owns and operates on former Canadian Pacific Railway's Empress Subdivision, Burstall Subdivision and Hazlet Spur (collectively known as the "Empress Short Line"). Great Sandhills Railway also operates on the McNeil Spur, but this track is owned by a wholly owned subsidiary of Great Sandhills Terminal. The purchase price for the Empress Short Line and the McNeil spur was $6.3 million, with $1,907,200 funded by a provincial loan under the Short Line Financial Assistance Program. At startup, the Great Sandhills Terminal was the major shareholder while other shareholders included local producers and businesses.

The railway serves freight stations in Burstall, Mendham, Leader, Prelate, Sceptre, Portreeve, Lancer, Abbey, Cabri, Battrum, Pennant, Success, Cantuar, and Swift Current. It interchanges with both the Canadian Pacific Railway and the Great Western Railway in Swift Current, via running rights on CP's Maple Creek Subdivision between Mayne and Swift Current.

The railway hauls grain from terminals, elevators and producer loading sites, and also moves products from the Empress Gas plants in Alberta.

In November 2022, G3 Canada sold the railroad to 3i Group's Regional Rail, LLC.

== See also ==
- Transportation in Saskatchewan
- Great Sand Hills
