= Saskatchewan Highway 332 =

Provincial highway in Saskatchewan, Canada

Highway 332

Route information
- Maintained by Ministry of Highways and Infrastructure
- Length: 43.7 km (27.2 mi)

Major junctions
- West end: Highway 633 at Hazlet
- Highway 37
- East end: Highway 32 at Cantuar

Location
- Country: Canada
- Province: Saskatchewan
- Rural municipalities: Pittville, Riverside, Swift Current

Highway system
- Provincial highways in Saskatchewan
← Highway 324	→ Highway 334

Highway 332 is a provincial highway in the Canadian province of Saskatchewan. It runs from Highway 633 in Hazlet until Highway 32 at Cantuar and provides access to Hazlet Regional Park. Highway 332 is about 44 kilometres (27 mi) long.

== Route description ==
Hwy 332 begins in the Rural Municipality of Pittville No. 169 in the centre of the village of Hazlet at the intersection with Hwy 633 (Township Road 170 / Range Road 3195), heading east to cross a former railway and have an intersection with the southern section of Range Road 3195 (leads south to Verlo) before traveling through rural farmland to enter the Rural Municipality of Riverside No. 168 via a short concurrency (overlap) with Hwy 37. After having an intersection with an access road to Fosterton (Range Road 3182), the highway heads southeast through rural prairie lands for several kilometres, where it crosses a former railway line and has a junction with Hwy 632, before curving back due eastward past several small lakes to enter the Rural Municipality of Swift Current No. 137. Continuing on, Hwy 332 travels through the southern portion of the hamlet of Cantuar, where it crosses the Great Sandhills Railway, before coming to an end at the intersection with Hwy 32, with the road continuing east as Township Road 164. The entire length of Hwy 332 is a paved, two-lane highway.

== History ==
Before 2005, Highway 332's western end was at the intersection between Range Road 3195 and Township Road 171 (access road to Hazlet Regional Park) just north of Hazlet, before Highway 633 was extended along this route.

== Major intersections ==
From west to east:

Rural municipality	Location	km	mi	Destinations	Notes
Pittville No. 169	Hazlet	0.0	0.0	Highway 633 (Township Road 170/Range Road 3195) – Tompkins, Shackleton, Hazlet Regional Park	Western terminus; road continues as southbound Hwy 633
↑ / ↓		8.2	5.1	Highway 37 south – Gull Lake, Antelope Lake Regional Park	West end of Hwy 37 concurrency
Riverside No. 168		9.9	6.2	Highway 37 north – Cabri	East end of Hwy 37 concurrency
Riverside No. 168		23.4	14.5	Highway 632 (Range Road 3170) – Pennant, Webb	
Swift Current No. 137	Cantuar	43.7	27.2	Highway 32 – Leader, Swift Current	Eastern terminus; road continues east as Township Road 164
1.000 mi = 1.609 km; 1.000 km = 0.621 mi: Concurrency terminus

== See also ==
- Transportation in Saskatchewan
- Roads in Saskatchewan
