= Division No. 8, Saskatchewan =

Census division in Canada

Coordinates: 50°18′N 107°48′W

Division No. 8
- Census division in Saskatchewan
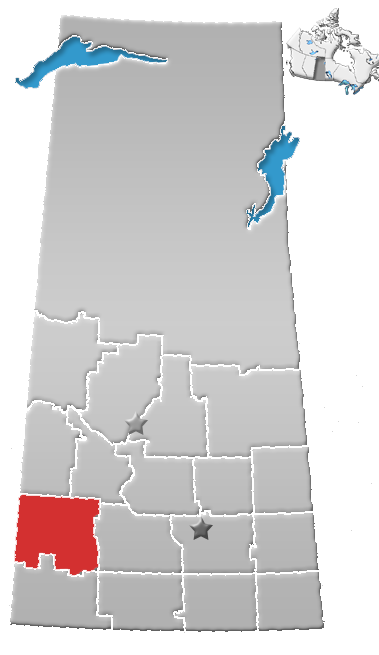
- Country: Canada
- Province: Saskatchewan

Area
  - Total: 22,244.10 km^{2} (8,588.50 sq mi)
- As of 2016

Population (2016)
  - Total: 30,718
  - Density: 1.3810/km^{2} (3.5766/sq mi)

Division No. 8 is one of eighteen census divisions in the province of Saskatchewan, Canada, as defined by Statistics Canada. It is located in the west-southwestern part of the province, bordering Alberta. The most populous community in this division is Swift Current.

== Demographics ==
In the 2021 Census of Population conducted by Statistics Canada, Division No. 8 had a population of 30,840 living in 12,739 of its 14,833 total private dwellings, a change of 0.4% from its 2016 population of 30,718. With a land area of 22,356.91 km^{2} (8,632.05 sq mi), it had a population density of 1.4/km^{2} (3.6/sq mi) in 2021.

Knowledge of languages in Division No. 8 (1991−2021)
Language	2021		2011		2001		1991	
Language	Pop.	%	Pop.	%	Pop.	%	Pop.	%
English	28,685	99.57%	29,480	99.7%	30,155	99.47%	32,080	99.72%
Tagalog	1,185	4.11%	465	1.57%	20	0.07%	0	0%
French	995	3.45%	940	3.18%	1,085	3.58%	1,270	3.95%
German (Note: Combined responses of the High German languages, including Standard German, Pennsylvania German, Swiss German, and Yiddish.)	635	2.2%	1,400	4.73%	2,840	9.37%	3,710	11.53%
Spanish	290	1.01%	155	0.52%	115	0.38%	60	0.19%
Chinese (Note: Combined responses of the Chinese languages, including Mandarin, Cantonese, Min Nan, Hakka, Wu (Shanghainese), Min Dong, Chinese, n.o.s., and Chinese languages, n.i.e..)	225	0.78%	210	0.71%	210	0.69%	175	0.54%
Hindustani (Note: Combined responses of Hindi and Urdu as they form mutually intelligible registers of the Hindustani language.)	135	0.47%	45	0.15%	60	0.2%	55	0.17%
Ukrainian	105	0.36%	55	0.19%	115	0.38%	235	0.73%
Punjabi	100	0.35%	15	0.05%	70	0.23%	40	0.12%
Greek	85	0.3%	0	0%	85	0.28%	0	0%
Russian	80	0.28%	35	0.12%	10	0.03%	15	0.05%
Arabic	40	0.14%	30	0.1%	35	0.12%	50	0.16%
Polish	30	0.1%	20	0.07%	40	0.13%	55	0.17%
Cree (Note: Combined responses of the Cree-Innu languages, previously categorized under "Cree" in past censuses.)	30	0.1%	15	0.05%	20	0.07%	20	0.06%
Dutch	20	0.07%	85	0.29%	155	0.51%	210	0.65%
Italian	15	0.05%	0	0%	25	0.08%	10	0.03%
Portuguese	10	0.03%	0	0%	30	0.1%	10	0.03%
Vietnamese	0	0%	0	0%	55	0.18%	0	0%
Hungarian	0	0%	0	0%	10	0.03%	20	0.06%
Total responses	28,810	93.42%	29,570	98.69%	30,315	98.68%	32,170	98.77%
Total population	30,840	100%	29,962	100%	30,720	100%	32,569	100%

== Census subdivisions ==
The following census subdivisions (municipalities or municipal equivalents) are located within Saskatchewan's Division No. 8.

=== Cities ===
- Swift Current

=== Towns ===
- Burstall
- Cabri
- Eatonia
- Elrose
- Eston
- Gull Lake
- Kyle
- Leader

=== Villages ===
- Abbey
- Fox Valley
- Golden Prairie
- Hazlet
- Lancer
- Mendham
- Pennant
- Prelate
- Richmound
- Sceptre
- Shackleton
- Stewart Valley
- Success
- Tompkins
- Webb

=== Rural municipalities ===
- RM No. 137 Swift Current
- RM No. 138 Webb
- RM No. 139 Gull Lake
- RM No. 141 Big Stick
- RM No. 142 Enterprise
- RM No. 167 Saskatchewan Landing
- RM No. 168 Riverside
- RM No. 169 Pittville
- RM No. 171 Fox Valley
- RM No. 228 Lacadena
- RM No. 229 Miry Creek
- RM No. 230 Clinworth
- RM No. 231 Happyland
- RM No. 232 Deer Forks
- RM No. 257 Monet
- RM No. 259 Snipe Lake
- RM No. 260 Newcombe
- RM No. 261 Chesterfield

=== Indian reserves ===
- Carry the Kettle Nakoda Nation
  - Carry the Kettle 76-33
  - Carry the Kettle 76-37
  - Carry the Kettle 76-38

=== Unincorporated communities ===
Hamlets

- Laporte

Organized hamlets

- White Bear
- Wymark

Special service areas

- Mantario

Unincorporated communities

- Abbey Colony
- Aikins
- Beverley
- Cantuar
- Chipperfield
- Cuthbert
- Duncairn
- Dunelm
- Estuary
- Eyre
- Forgan
- Gascoigne
- Glidden
- Greenan
- Gunnworth
- Hak
- High Point
- Horsham
- Hughton
- Inglebright
- Isham
- Java
- Lacadena
- Leinan
- Lemsford
- Lille
- Linacre
- Madison
- Matador
- Mondou
- Nadeauville
- Penkill
- Plato
- Player
- Portreeve
- Rhineland
- Richlea
- Roadene
- Rosengart
- Roseray
- Saltburn
- Sanctuary
- Schantzenfeld
- Schoenfeld
- Schoenwiese
- Shackleton
- Snipe Lake
- Springfeld
- Surprise
- Tuberose
- Tunstall
- Tyner
- Verlo
- Wartime
- Wheatland Colony
- Witley
- Wyatt

== See also ==
- List of census divisions of Saskatchewan
- List of communities in Saskatchewan
