= Saskatchewan Highway 32 =

Provincial highway in Saskatchewan, Canada

Highway 32
- Highway 32 highlighted in red
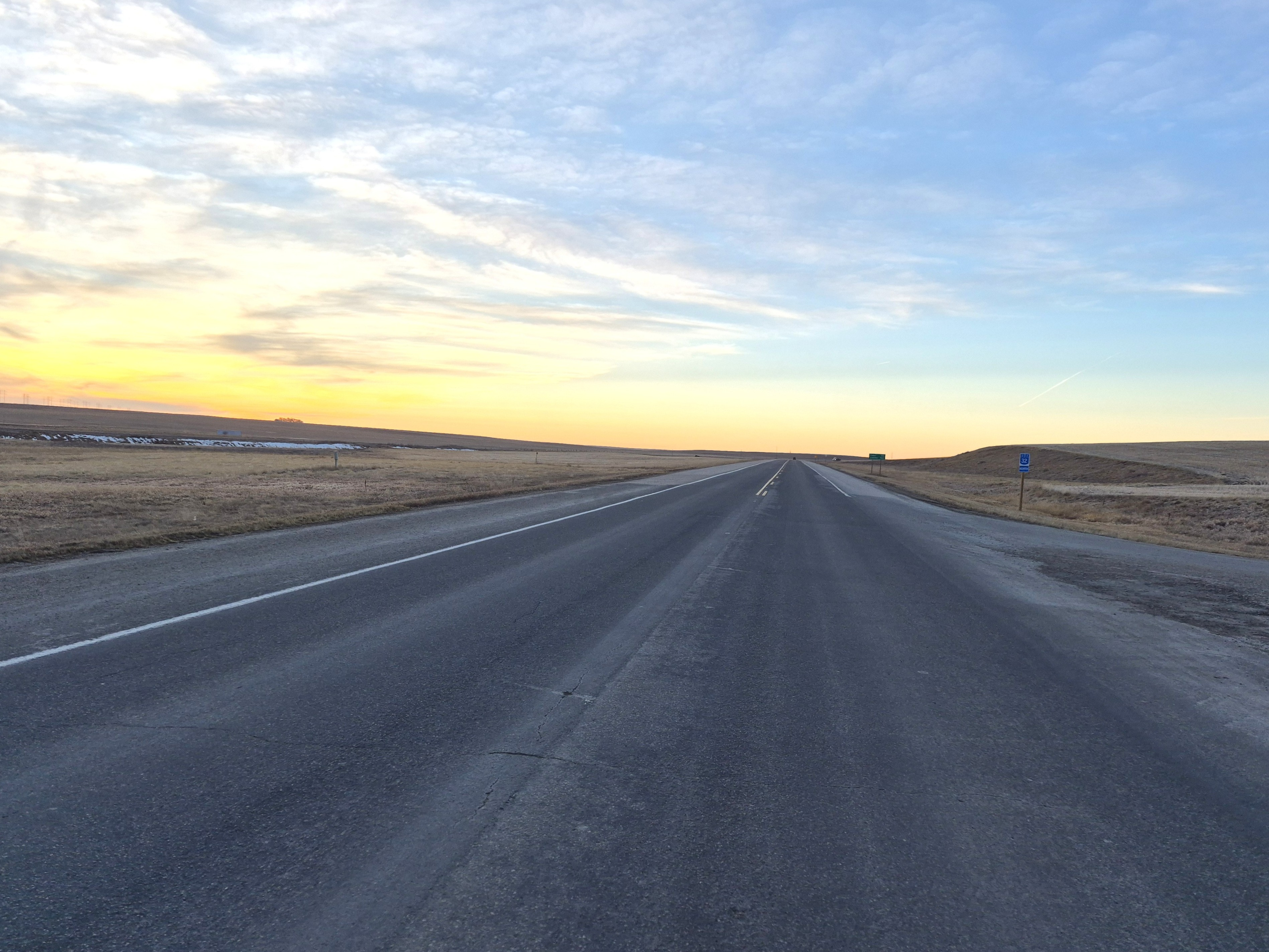
- Highway 32 near its eastern terminus

Route information
- Maintained by Ministry of Highways and Infrastructure
- Length: 141.5 km (87.9 mi)

Major junctions
- West end: Highway 21 in Leader
- Highway 37 in Cabri
- East end: Highway 1 (TCH) near Swift Current

Location
- Country: Canada
- Province: Saskatchewan
- Rural municipalities: Happyland, Clinworth, Miry Creek, Riverside, Saskatchewan Landing, Swift Current

Highway system
- Provincial highways in Saskatchewan
← Highway 31	→ Highway 33

Highway 32 is an east–west provincial highway in the south-western portion of the Canadian province of Saskatchewan connecting Highway 21 at Leader and Highway 1 (TCH) west of Swift Current. Highways that intersect Highway 32 include 649 at Lemsford, 738 at Abbey, 37 and 738 at Cabri, 632 at Pennant, 332 near Cantuar, and 728 near Highway 1. It is about 142 kilometres (88 mi) long.

By the early to mid-2000s, the condition of Highway 32 had deteriorated so badly that ambulances were avoiding it and a 2007 nude calendar was created featuring local citizens and the highway's potholes. The calendar gained world-wide attention and helped spur the highway's rebuilding.

== History ==
The first travel in this area was by foot, two-wheeled ox carts and horse-drawn freight wagons using trails on the sod. The first train arrived in Lancer in 1913. The late 1920s and 1930s saw the automobile arrive to a few families in the area.

The subgrade construction of Highway 32 was started in 1945 by E.R. Gibbs and gravelled 1947, 1955 and 1959. Oil treatment was commenced in 1965 and reoiled 1968.

1. Improvements were made paving: Swift Current to Success 1969–71.
2. Success to Cabri 1972–74
3. Leader to Prelate by Wappell Construction 1986–87.

— Our Heritage Recalled: Prelate, Saskatchewan, 1908–1990

== Route description ==
Highway 32 begins from Highway 21 at the south end of Leader and travels in a south-east direction to Highway 1 west of Swift Current. To the north of the highway is the South Saskatchewan River and to the south are the Great Sand Hills. For its entire length, the highway follows the Canadian Pacific Railway (CPR).

South-east of Leader, Highway 32 provides access to Leader Airport, Prelate, and Sceptre. Sceptre is home to the Great Sandhills Museum, a metal wheat sculpture, and is the gateway to the Great Sand Hills. Travelling east then south-east from Sceptre, Highway 32 provides access to the ghost towns of Lemsford, Portreeve, Shackleton, and Battrum. Also along that stretch of highway are the communities of Lancer, which has the Lancer museum and the 21-foot-high (6.4 m) Chokecherry Cluster sculpture, Abbey, and Cabri. Cabri is located at the junction of Highway 32 and Highway 37 and features oversized goose, antelope, and wheat sculptures. Pennant, Success, and Cantuar are the final three stops on Highway 32 before it terminates at Highway 1 about 9 kilometres (5.6 mi) west of Swift Current.

== Maintenance and upgrades ==
Highway 32 had become infamous for its extremely poor condition, which can primarily be attributed to a substandard pavement design (thin membrane surface (TMS)) and claims of lack of maintenance. Sections of the highway were reverted to gravel and the condition of the route was so bad that ambulances were avoiding it as much as possible.

In 2006, to bring attention to the poor condition of the highway, 12 people — eleven men and one woman — from Leader produced a humorous, nude 2007 calendar. The calendar garnered world-wide attention and sold 3,000 copies raising $40,000 for a new roof on Leader's community hall. Also in 2006, bumper stickers were being sold that read, "I survived Sask Hwy 32". On 17 May 2006, Southwest TV News produced a three-part series regarding the highway and its road condition. A Letter of understanding (LOU) was signed by 22 south-west towns, municipalities, and government offices.

In 2006, in response to public outcry over poor road conditions around the province, NDP Highways Minister Eldon Lautermilch said that "Saskatchewan can't afford the cost of maintaining all its roads". In regards to Highway 32, he said a "nude calendar won't solve the problem" and that "they're very creative people". It was not until a change of government to the Saskatchewan Party in 2007 that there was a "change in attitude" towards fixing Highway 32. By 2010, much of the highway had been rebuilt.

Significant upgrades to Highway 32 include:

- The winter of 2000 saw 6.4 km (4.0 mi) resurfaced from west of Cabri to east of Shackleton
- In 2001, summer crews resurfaced from 5 km (3.1 mi) west of Cabri westward for a further 6.5 km (4.0 mi). This repair allowed heavier truck loads on the route.
- In 2005, 10.1 km (6.3 mi) were resurfaced. Construction work began on Highway 32 at the entrance to Success and continued west for 10.1 km (6.3 mi). Wheel ruts and surface deterioration were levelled and filled and a microsurface treatment was put into place to restore resistance to skidding.
- In 2006, 29 km (18 mi) of Highway 32 were converted to a gravel road to alleviate the asphalt surface potholes. Residents lobbying for highway repairs published a "Pothole of the Month" calendar, "I Survived Highway 32" bumper stickers, and a billboard was erected on the roadside. The Leader ambulance had to travel another route which was a 1/2-hour longer to get to the Regional Hospital in Swift Current.
- From the south-west to the north-east of Cabri, 14.2 km (8.8 mi) of the highway was resurfaced in the summer of 2007 as part of Phase I Saskatchewan Highways and Infrastructure's 2008 Tender Release.
- At a cost of $31.8 million, the 56 km (35 mi) stretch of the highway between Shackleton and Prelate was upgraded from thin membrane surface (TMS) road to a fully structural paved road designed for full regular highway traffic. This work started in May 2009 and was completed by October 2010.
- In 2022, 8.7 km (5.4 mi) of highway was resurfaced beginning just west of Success

== Major intersections ==
From west to east:

Rural municipality	Location	km	mi	Destinations	Notes
Happyland No. 231	Leader	0.0	0.0	Highway 21 to Highway 741 west – Kindersley, Maple Creek	
Happyland No. 231	Prelate	10.2	6.3	Range Road 3253	
Clinworth No. 230	Lemsford	29.9	18.6	Highway 649 north – Lemsford Ferry	
Miry Creek No. 229	Lancer	47.5	29.5	Highway 634 north – Lancer Ferry	
Miry Creek No. 229	Abbey	60.0	37.3	Highway 738 south	
Miry Creek No. 229	Shackleton	71.3	44.3	Highway 633 south – Hazlet	
Riverside No. 168	Cabri	86.4	53.7	Highway 37 south / Highway 639 – Gull Lake	
Riverside No. 168	Pennant	105.6	65.6	Highway 632 – Pennant, Cabri Regional Park	
Saskatchewan Landing No. 167	No major junctions				
Swift Current No. 137	Cantuar	131.4	81.6	Highway 332 west – Hazlet	
Swift Current No. 137		138.6	86.1	Highway 728 west – Nadeauville	
Swift Current No. 137		140.0	87.0	Range Road 3152 to Highway 1 (TCH) west – Medicine Hat	Access from Highway 1 east
Swift Current No. 137		141.5	87.9	Highway 1 (TCH) east – Swift Current	Interchange; westbound exit and eastbound entrance
1.000 mi = 1.609 km; 1.000 km = 0.621 mi: Incomplete access

== See also ==
- Transportation in Saskatchewan
- Roads in Saskatchewan
