= Saskatchewan German Council =

Founded in 1984, the Saskatchewan German Council Inc. (SGC) is a registered volunteer-based, non-profit organization that promotes the heritage, culture and interests of people of German-speaking backgrounds in Saskatchewan, Canada. The council's head office is located in Saskatoon. 2014 marked SGC's 30th anniversary.

== Mandate ==
To promote German culture, language, customs, traditions and interests for the benefit of all Saskatchewan people.

== Governance ==
The Saskatchewan German Council Inc. is guided in all its activities by its by-laws and by a set of policies. A board of directors consisting of 11 elected members meets at least twice a year to set the tone and direction for Council activities. Committees are investigate and manage matters of special interest.

== Funding ==
The Saskatchewan German Council Inc. is a member of SaskCulture Inc., under whose umbrella it receives Lottery funding and access to the community of Saskatchewan. The Council generates funds with the revenues going directly to SGC member organizations for support. The council receives financial support for projects from Heritage Canada, Service Canada, SaskCulture and Saskatchewan Lotteries. The council offers several funding opportunities for members and non-members.

== Membership ==
Membership is open to any organization or individual who agrees to abide by the SGC constitution and policies.

== Organizational Members ==
SGC has over 30 organizational members across Saskatchewan. Member programs include choirs, dance groups, German language programs, cooking classes, a German-speaking radio program, arts and crafts programs, movie viewings and special events during the holiday seasons, such as a traditional German Christmas Market, Christmas Concerts, Oktoberfest activities, and Carnival.

== SGC Scholarship ==
In 1996, the Council decided to recognize academic achievement and encourage students to pursue undergraduate studies in German at the University of Saskatchewan in Saskatoon and the University of Regina. Two $500 annual scholarships were created, one at each of Saskatchewan's universities. In 2007, the SGC Scholarship was renamed the Saskatchewan German Council Scholarship In Memory of Dr. Brian McKinstry.

== Special Volunteer Awards ==
The SGC Special Volunteer Awards have been presented since 2000 to outstanding volunteers serving the SGC community and the province of Saskatchewan at large. The awards are handed out at the Special Volunteer Awards Banquet during the annual Treffpunkt (Meeting Place) weekend in June of each year. In 2014, a SGC Youth Volunteer Award was added.

== Projects ==
Settlements in Saskatchewan The Settlements in Saskatchewan project involved the publication of maps giving graphical representations of the settlement patterns of German communities in Saskatchewan. The project was supported by the Saskatchewan German Council Inc., the Saskatchewan Centennial, Heritage Canada, and Saskatchewan Lotteries.

The settlement information was taken from a 1990 graphic drawn by H. Heimann. The information was compiled by Dr. A. B. Anderson, a professor of Sociology at the University of Saskatchewan in Saskatoon, SK. The 2005 enhanced map was compiled and digitized by B. Stehwein, P. Geo.

SGC Immigrant Settlement Handbook In the face of the growing number of German speaking immigrants to Saskatchewan, and the growing need for immigration and settlement assistance, the Saskatchewan German Council Inc. has launched the SGC Immigrant Settlement Handbook Project to provide immigrants with a guide to settling in Saskatchewan. The handbook includes information on immigration, housing, employment, education and childcare, health and emergency services, legal services, recreation and cultural services, as well as consumer information such as food and groceries, transportation and banking.

The handbook contains information on local communities with a large population of German-speaking descent, including Prince Albert, North Battleford, Lloydminster, Regina and Saskatoon, as well as smaller communities such as Leader, Humboldt, Melville and Estevan.

The SGC Immigrant Settlement Handbook was published in 2009 in German and English. A second, revised edition was published in 2012. A third edition was published in 2016 and is available at the office.

German Cultural Tradition Books The Saskatchewan German Council wanted to promote German customs that occur throughout the year. Four books have been composed that explain traditions and give insights as well as recipes and art & craft ideas. The books are call "Weihnachten - Christmas", "Ostern - Easter", "Karnival - Carnival", and "Verschiedene Tradition - Various Traditions". The books are written in English and German and includes coloured pictures. They can be purchased at the office in Saskatoon.

Culture in the Kitchen As an organization we are interested in sharing our culture with others, in creating a two-way learning opportunity and in building better understanding of each other. With this Multicultural Cooking Series called “Culture in the Kitchen” we are reaching out to other cultural groups to cook with us, working cross-culturally and sharing traditional dishes and information with anyone who is interested.

#WeAreSK The idea of partnering with different provincial organizations was to highlight the contributions of the multicultural community to Saskatchewan culture. There is a shared desire to highlight the process newcomers have undergone in several generations to settle in Saskatchewan and integrate into their communities.

== Newsletter ==
"The Postillion" is SGC's quarterly published newsletter that includes articles and reports by SGC member organizations, information on German cultural and traditional events in Saskatchewan, as well as interviews, and life stories of people of German-speaking background.

There is also an e-update available for anyone that would like information straight to their inbox.

== Publications ==
- Cookbook. (2016) by Kochlöffel and Nudelholz - Germa-Canadian Koch- und Backstudio and the Saskatchewan German Council
- Sudeten in Saskatchewan - A Way to be Free. (2011) by Rita Schilling
- St. Peters Bote. (2011) by Peter M. Sullivan
- German Cultural Traditions Series. (2010) by Saskatchewan German Council
- Bridges: A Book of Legacies for Saskatchewan People of German Speaking Backgrounds. (2006) by Dr. Brian McKinstry
- German Settlements in Saskatchewan (2005) by Dr. Alan B. Anderson
- MAP: German Settlements & Communities in Saskatchewan (2005) size: 11 in. x 17 in.
