= Rural Municipality of Happyland No. 231 =

Rural municipality in Saskatchewan, Canada

Happyland No. 231 Prussia No. 231 (1913 – 1917)
- Rural municipality
- Rural Municipality of Happyland No. 231
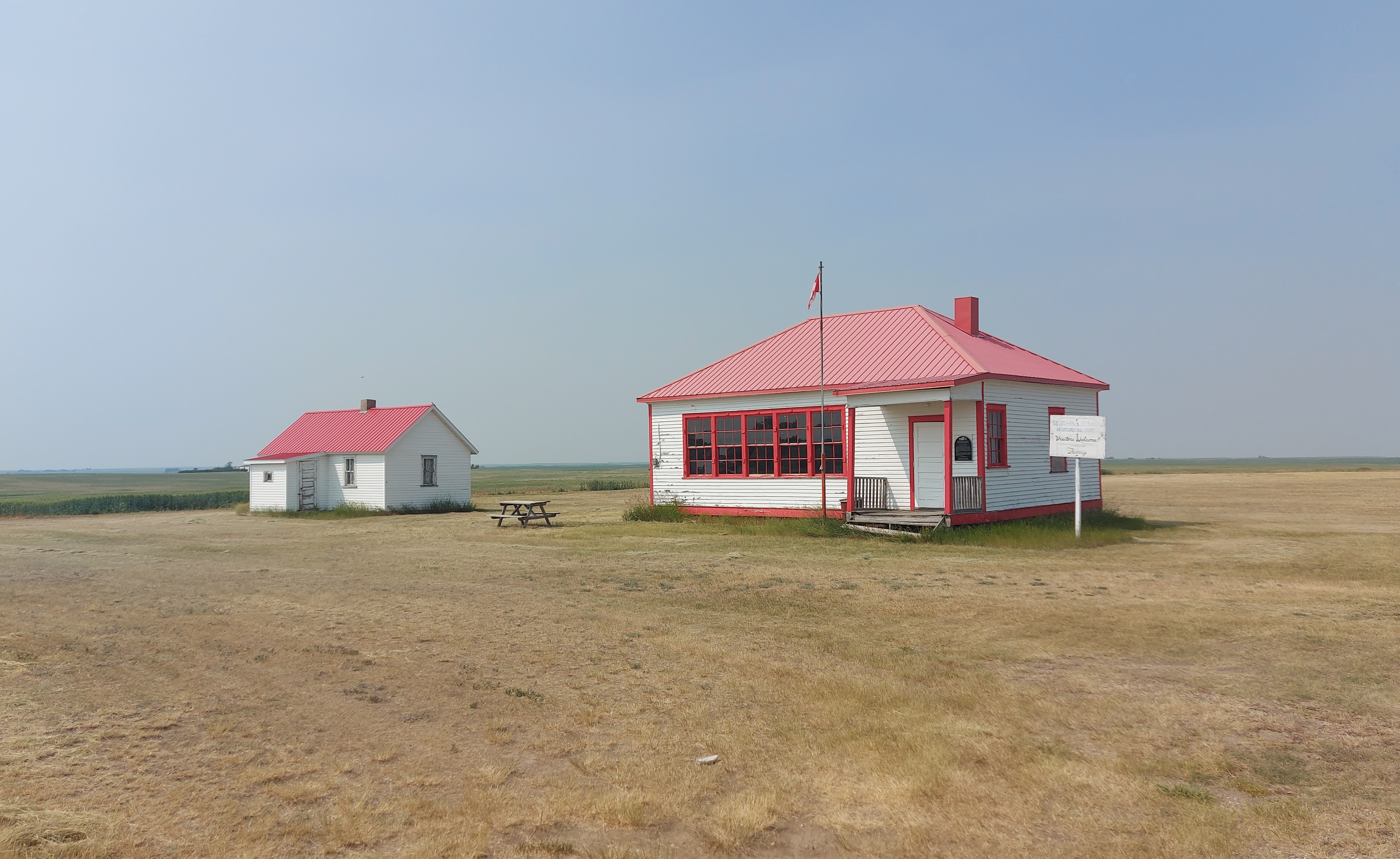
- St. John's School

- Location of the RM of Happyland No. 231 in Saskatchewan
- Coordinates: 50.899°N 109.578°W
- Country: Canada
- Province: Saskatchewan
- Census division: 8
- SARM division: 3
- Federal riding: Swift Current—Grasslands—Kindersley
- Provincial riding: Cypress Hills
- Formed: January 1, 1913
- Name change: 1917 (from RM of Prussia No. 231)

Government
  - Reeve: Anthony Wagner
  - Governing body: RM of Happyland No. 231 Council
  - Administrator: Kim Lacelle
  - Office location: Leader

Area (2021)
  - Land: 1,269.18 km^{2} (490.03 sq mi)

Population (2021)
  - Total: 285
  - Density: 0.2/km^{2} (0.52/sq mi)
- Time zone: CST
  - Summer (DST): CST
- Area codes: 306 / 639 / 474
- Highway(s): Highway 21; Highway 32; Highway 321
- Railway(s): Great Sandhills Railway

The Rural Municipality of Happyland No. 231 (2021 population: 285) is a rural municipality (RM) in the Canadian province of Saskatchewan within Census Division No. 8 and SARM Division No. 3. Located in the southwest portion of the province, it is adjacent to the Alberta boundary and south of the South Saskatchewan River.

== History ==
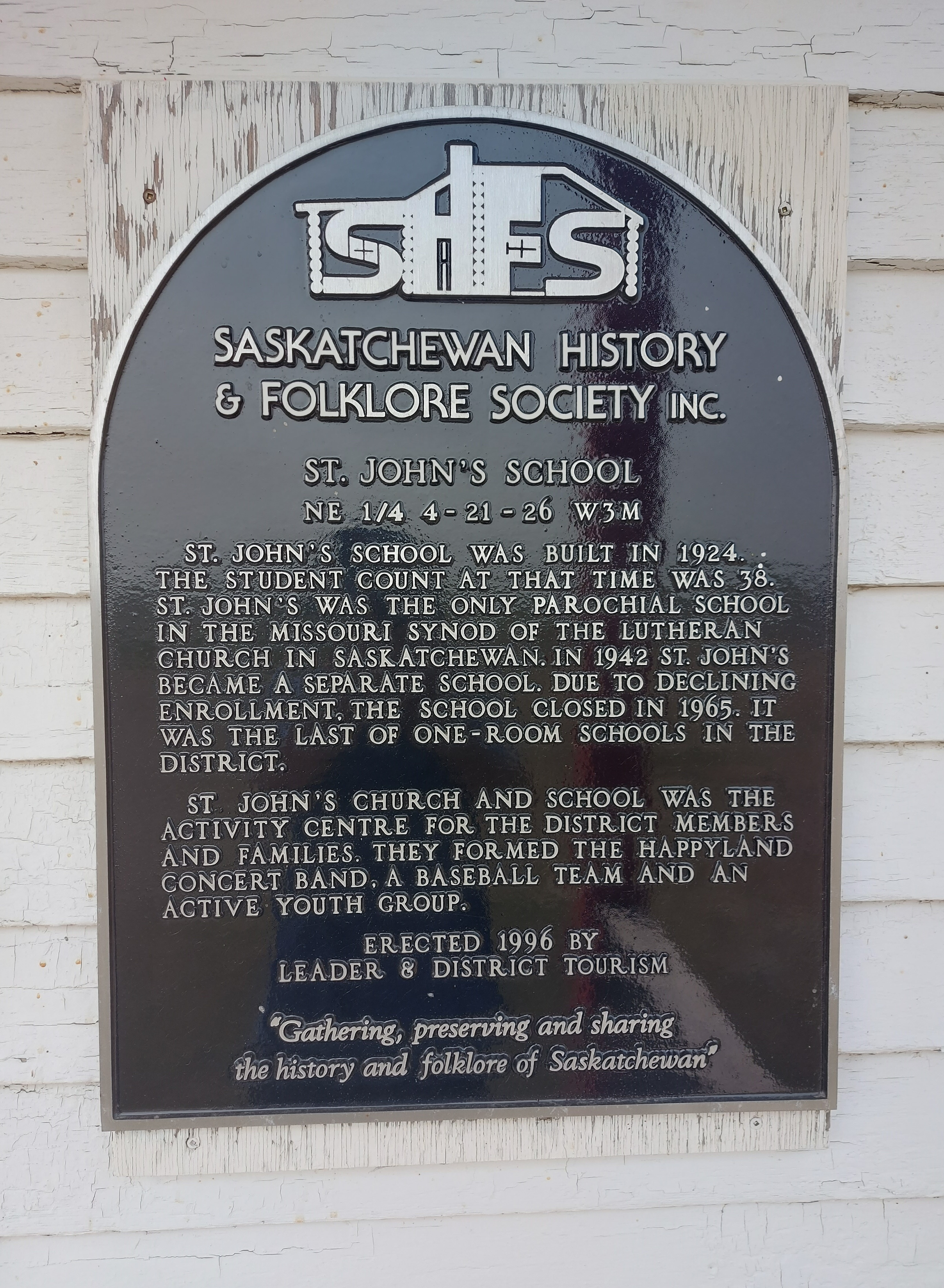
St. John's School plaque

On January 1, 1913, the RM of Happyland No. 231 became a rural municipality. It was originally named the RM of Prussia No. 231 but its name was changed sometime during 1917, at the height of the First World War and anti-German sentiment in Saskatchewan.

== Geography ==
=== Communities and localities ===
The following urban municipalities are surrounded by the RM.

Towns

- Leader

Villages

- Mendham
- Prelate

The following unincorporated communities are within the RM.

Localities

- Liebenthal

== Demographics ==
Population history (1981–2021)
Year	Pop.	±%
1981	331	—
1986	279	−15.7%
1991	222	−20.4%
1996	217	−2.3%
2001	174	−19.8%
2006	297	+70.7%
2011	284	−4.4%
2016	249	−12.3%
2021	285	+14.5%
Source: Statistics Canada via Saskatchewan Bureau of Statistics

In the 2021 Census of Population conducted by Statistics Canada, the RM of Happyland No. 231 had a population of 285 living in 110 of its 140 total private dwellings, a change of 14.5% from its 2016 population of 249. With a land area of 1,269.18 km^{2} (490.03 sq mi), it had a population density of 0.2/km^{2} (0.6/sq mi) in 2021.

In the 2016 Census of Population, the RM of Happyland No. 231 recorded a population of 249 living in 101 of its 113 total private dwellings, a −12.3% change from its 2011 population of 284. With a land area of 1,259 km^{2} (486 sq mi), it had a population density of 0.2/km^{2} (0.5/sq mi) in 2016.

== Government ==
The RM of Happyland No. 231 is governed by an elected municipal council and an appointed administrator that meets on the second Tuesday of every month. The reeve of the RM is Anthony Wagner while its administrator is Kim Lacelle. The RM's office is located in Leader.

== Transportation ==
Rail

- Great Sandhills Railway (a Leader-to-Swift Current branch line)

Roads

- Highway 21—serves Leader, Liebenthal
- Highway 32—serves Leader, Prelate
- Highway 321—serves Liebenthal
