= Rural Municipality of Riverside No. 168 =

Rural municipality in Saskatchewan, Canada

Riverside No. 168
- Rural municipality
- Rural Municipality of Riverside No. 168
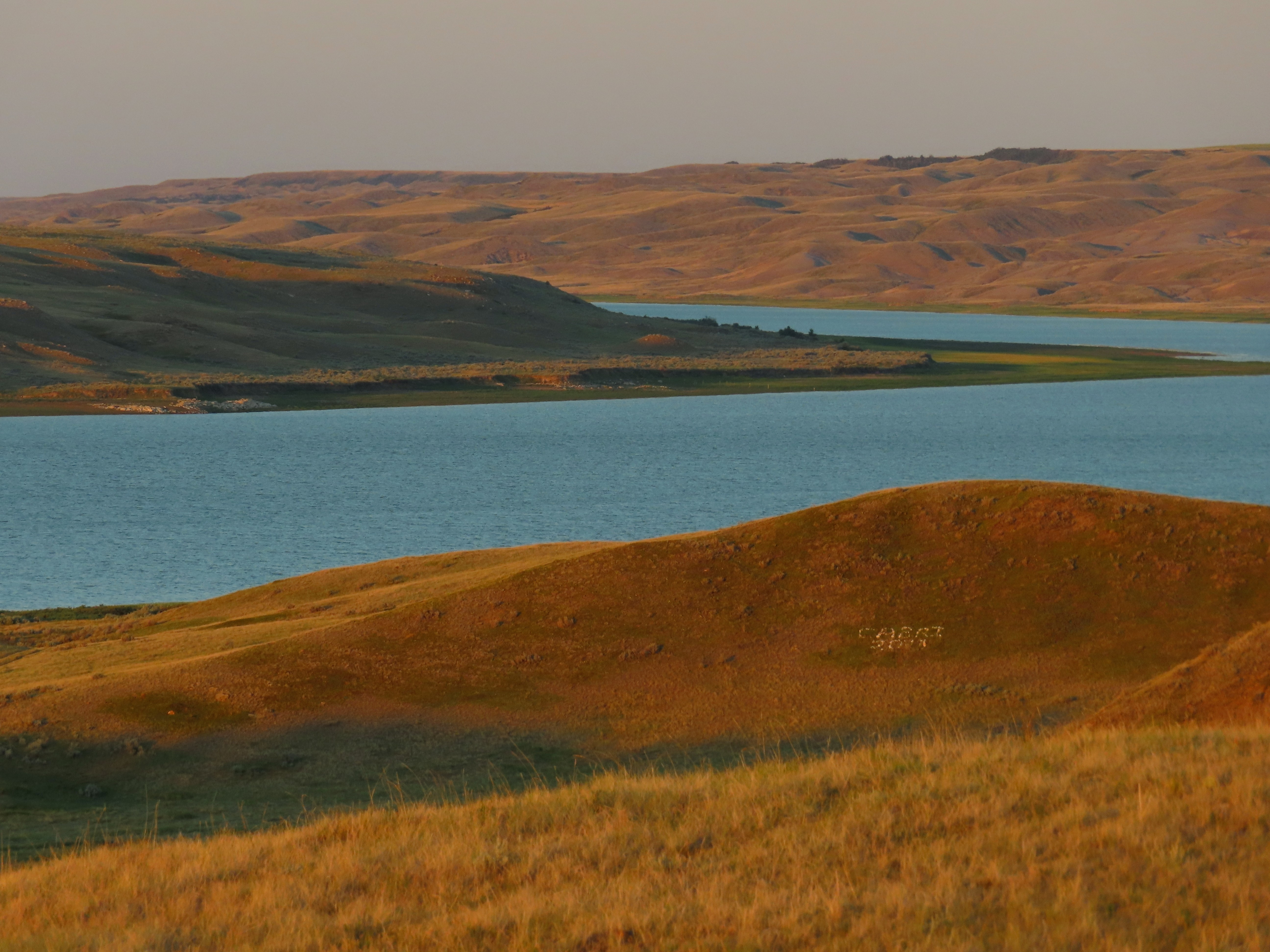
- South Saskatchewan River at Cabri Regional Park

- Location of the RM of Riverside No. 168 in Saskatchewan
- Coordinates: 50.690°N 108.278°W
- Country: Canada
- Province: Saskatchewan
- Census division: 8
- SARM division: 3
- Formed: January 1, 1913

Government
  - Reeve: Richard Bye
  - Governing body: RM of Riverside No. 168 Council
  - Administrator: Brandi Prentice
  - Office location: Pennant

Area (2016)
  - Land: 1,298.39 km^{2} (501.31 sq mi)

Population (2016)
  - Total: 477
  - Density: 0.4/km^{2} (1.0/sq mi)
- Time zone: CST
  - Summer (DST): CST
- Area codes: 306 and 639

The Rural Municipality of Riverside No. 168 (2016 population: 477) is a rural municipality (RM) in the Canadian province of Saskatchewan within Census Division No. 8 and SARM Division No. 3.

== History ==
The RM of Riverside No. 168 incorporated as a rural municipality on January 1, 1913.

Historical properties

There is one historical building located within the RM.

- St. John's Norwegian Lutheran Church - (Also called St. John's Lutheran Church and Cemetery) the building was erected in 1919 by Norwegian pioneers to the area. The site is located 15 km south of Cabri

== Geography ==
The north boundary of the RM is one of the arms of Lake Diefenbaker.

=== Communities and localities ===
The following urban municipalities are surrounded by the RM.

Towns

- Cabri

Villages

- Success

The following unincorporated communities are within the RM.

Localities

- Battrum

== Demographics ==
Population history (1981–2016)
Year	Pop.	±%
1981	662	—
1986	677	+2.3%
1991	619	−8.6%
1996	552	−10.8%
2001	495	−10.3%
2006	511	+3.2%
2011	490	−4.1%
2016	477	−2.7%
Source: Statistics Canada via Saskatchewan Bureau of Statistics

In the 2021 Census of Population conducted by Statistics Canada, the RM of Riverside No. 168 had a population of 436 living in 161 of its 192 total private dwellings, a change of −8.6% from its 2016 population of 477. With a land area of 1,307.46 km^{2} (504.81 sq mi), it had a population density of 0.3/km^{2} (0.9/sq mi) in 2021.

In the 2016 Census of Population, the RM of Riverside No. 168 recorded a population of 477 living in 176 of its 205 total private dwellings, a −2.7% change from its 2011 population of 490. With a land area of 1,298.39 km^{2} (501.31 sq mi), it had a population density of 0.4/km^{2} (1.0/sq mi) in 2016.

== Government ==
The RM of Riverside No. 168 is governed by an elected municipal council and an appointed administrator that meets on the second Tuesday of every month. The reeve of the RM is Richard Bye while its administrator is Brandi Prentice. The RM's office is located in Pennant.

== Cabri Regional Park ==
Cabri Regional Park (50.6694°N 108.2668°W) is a regional park on the southern shore of Lake Diefenbaker that was created in 1976. The park has a campground, beach access, a marina, 3-hole disk golf, boat launch, picnic area, and hiking trails. The campground has over 100 sites, potable water, showers / washrooms, camp kitchen, and a sewer dumping station.

== Transportation ==
- Saskatchewan Highway 32
- Saskatchewan Highway 332
- Saskatchewan Highway 738

== See also ==
- List of rural municipalities in Saskatchewan
