= Lancer, Saskatchewan =

Community in Saskatchewan, Canada

Lancer
- Special service area
- Location of Lancer in Saskatchewan Lancer (Canada)
- Coordinates: 50.801°N 108.878°W
- Country: Canada
- Province: Saskatchewan
- Region: Southwest
- Census division: 8
- Rural municipality: Miry Creek No. 229
- Post office: 1913
- Incorporated (village): September 11, 1913
- Dissolved: August 1, 2022

Area
  - Land: 1.32 km^{2} (0.51 sq mi)

Population (2021)
  - Total: 58
- Time zone: UTC-6 (CST)
- Postal code: S0N 1G0
- Area code: 306
- Highways: Highway 32 Highway 634
- Railways: Great Sandhills Railway

Lancer (2021 population: 58) is a special service area in the Canadian province of Saskatchewan within the Rural Municipality of Miry Creek No. 229 and Census Division No. 8. It held village status between 1913 and 2022.

== History ==
Lancer incorporated as a village on September 11, 1913. It restructured on August 1, 2022, relinquishing its village status in favour of becoming a special service area under the jurisdiction of the RM of Miry Creek No. 229.

== Demographics ==
Population history (1981–2021)
Year	Pop.	±%
1981	156	—
1986	119	−23.7%
1991	94	−21.0%
1996	99	+5.3%
2001	75	−24.2%
2006	65	−13.3%
2011	61	−6.2%
2016	69	+13.1%
2021	58	−15.9%
Source: Statistics Canada via Saskatchewan Bureau of Statistics

In the 2021 Census of Population conducted by Statistics Canada, Lancer had a population of 58 living in 28 of its 33 total private dwellings, a change of −15.9% from its 2016 population of 69. With a land area of 1.32 km^{2} (0.51 sq mi), it had a population density of 43.9/km^{2} (113.8/sq mi) in 2021.

In the 2016 Census of Population, Lancer had a population of 69 living in 32 of its 35 total private dwellings, an 11.6% change from its 2011 population of 61. With a land area of 1.33 km^{2} (0.51 sq mi), it had a population density of 51.9/km^{2} (134.4/sq mi) in 2016.

== See also ==
- List of communities in Saskatchewan
