= Success Power Station =

- Country: Canada
- Location: Success, Saskatchewan
- Coordinates: 50.4291°N 108.1608°W
- Status: Operational
- Commission date: 1967-1968
- Owner: SaskPower

Thermal power station
- Primary fuel: Natural gas

Power generation
- Nameplate capacity: 30 MW

Success Power Station is a natural gas-fired station owned by SaskPower, located in Success, Saskatchewan, Canada and operated as a peaking plant.

== Description ==
The Success Station consists of:

- 3 - 10 MW units, commissioned in 1967/8

== See also ==
- SaskPower
