= Cantuar, Saskatchewan =

Community in Saskatchewan, Canada

Cantuar
- Unincorporated community
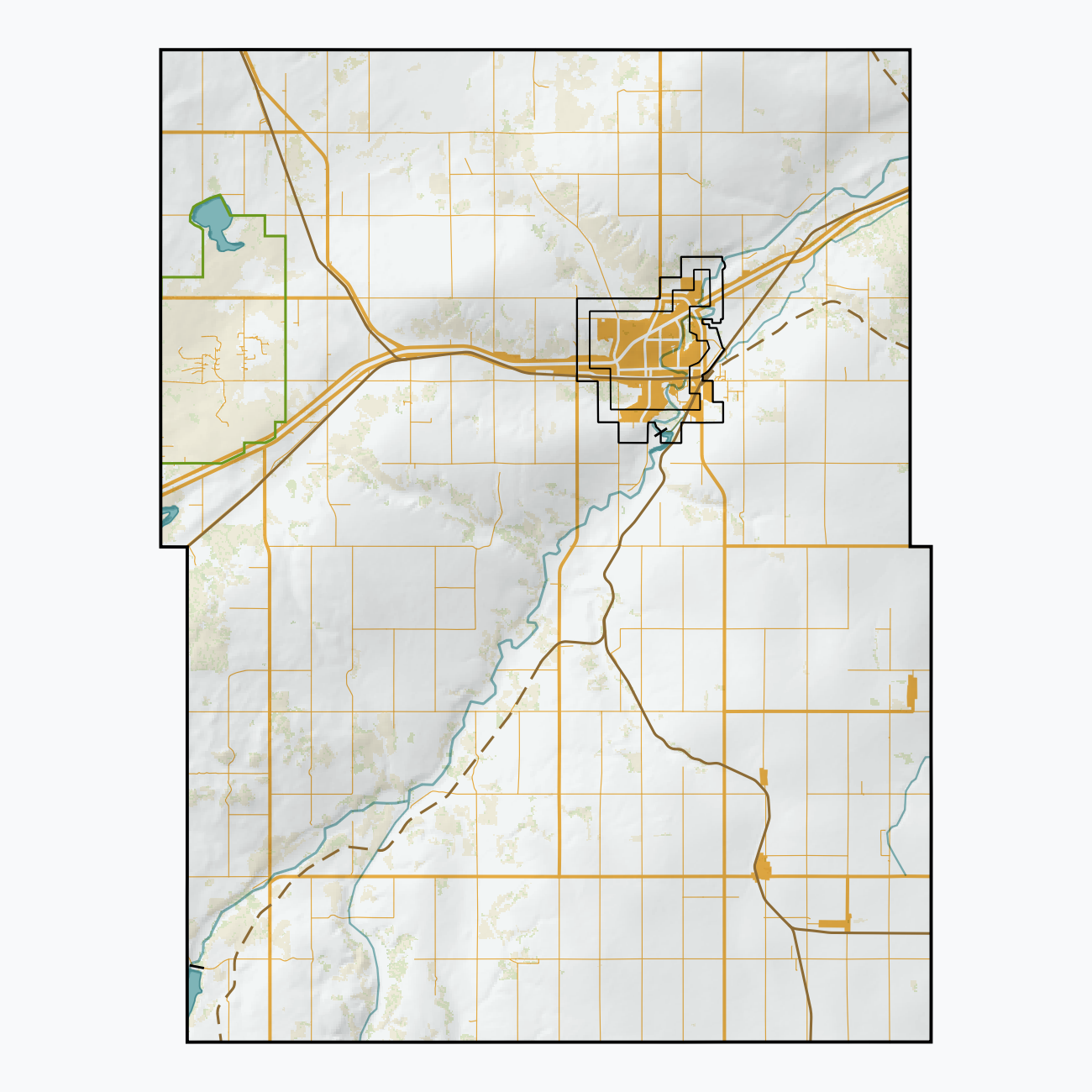
- Location within Swift Current No. 137 Location within Saskatchewan
- Coordinates: 50.3722°N 108.0091°W
- Country: Canada
- Province: Saskatchewan
- Region: Southwest Saskatchewan
- Census division: 8
- Rural Municipality: Swift Current No. 137
- Post office established: February 1, 1913
- Post office closed: September 30, 1964
- Postal code: NA
- Area code: 306
- Highways: Highway 32 / Highway 332

Cantuar is an unincorporated community in Rural Municipality of Swift Current No. 137, Saskatchewan, Canada. The site is still used as a freight station by the Great Sandhills Railway. The community is located approximately 23 kilometres (14 mi) northwest of the city of Swift Current at the intersection of Highway 32 and Highway 332.

== See also ==
- List of communities in Saskatchewan
- List of hamlets in Saskatchewan
- List of ghost towns in Saskatchewan
