= Success, Saskatchewan =

Community in Saskatchewan, Canada

Success
- Special service area
- Location of Success in Saskatchewan Success (Canada)
- Coordinates: 50°27′36″N 108°04′46″W
- Country: Canada
- Province: Saskatchewan
- Region: Southwest Saskatchewan
- Census division: Division No. 8, Saskatchewan
- Rural municipality: Riverside No. 168
- Post office: December 1, 1912
- Incorporated (village): October 25, 1912
- Dissolved: July 15, 2022

Area
  - Land: 1.36 km^{2} (0.53 sq mi)

Population (2021)
  - Total: 45
- Postal code: S0N 2R0
- Area code: 306
- Highways: Highway 32
- Railway: Great Sandhills Railway

Success (2021 population: 45) is a special service area in the Canadian province of Saskatchewan within the Rural Municipality of Riverside No. 168 and Census Division No. 8. It held village status between 1912 and 2022.

== History ==
Success incorporated as a village on October 25, 1912. It restructured on July 15, 2022, relinquishing its village status in favour of becoming a special service area under the jurisdiction of the RM of Riverside No. 168.

== Geography ==
Success is along the Great Sandhills Railway line and Highway 32. The Success Power Station operated by SaskPower is near the community.

== Demographics ==
Population history (1981–2021)
Year	Pop.	±%
1981	63	—
1986	61	−3.2%
1991	46	−24.6%
1996	49	+6.5%
2001	51	+4.1%
2006	40	−21.6%
2011	40	+0.0%
2016	45	+12.5%
2021	45	+0.0%
Source: Statistics Canada via Saskatchewan Bureau of Statistics

In the 2021 Census of Population conducted by Statistics Canada, Success had a population of 45 living in 18 of its 25 total private dwellings, a change of 0% from its 2016 population of 45. With a land area of 1.36 km^{2} (0.53 sq mi), it had a population density of 33.1/km^{2} (85.7/sq mi) in 2021.

In the 2016 Census of Population, Success had a population of 45 living in 19 of its 21 total private dwellings, a 11.1% change from its 2011 population of 40. With a land area of 1.38 km^{2} (0.53 sq mi), it had a population density of 32.6/km^{2} (84.5/sq mi) in 2016.

== Notable people ==
- Bridget Moran
