= Lemsford, Saskatchewan =

Community in Saskatchewan, Canada

Lemsford
- Unincorporated hamlet
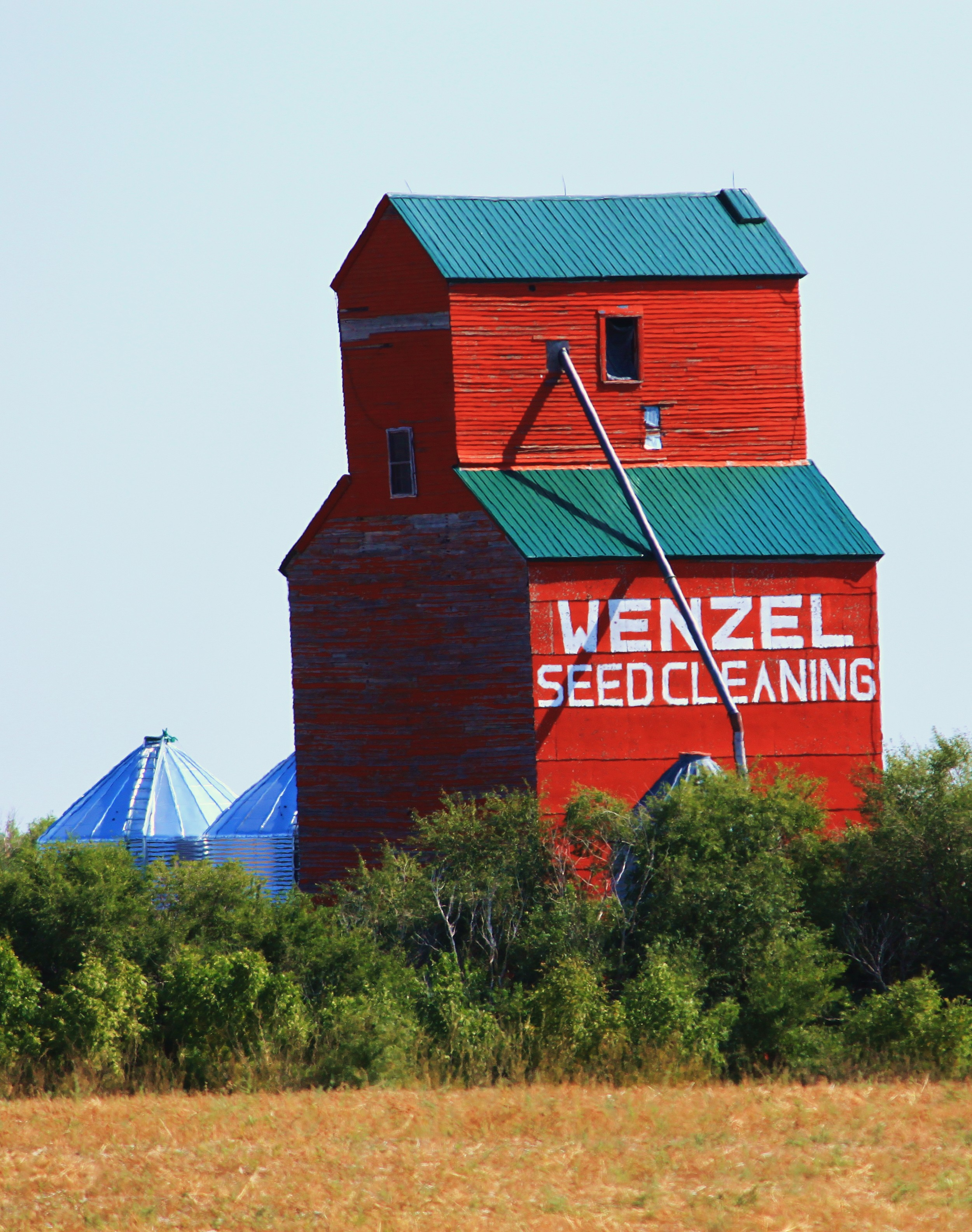
- Grain elevator originally from Lemsford, now located at a farm south of Leader, on Highway 21

- Location within Clinworth No. 230 Location within Saskatchewan
- Coordinates: 50.8507°N 109.1209°W
- Country: Canada
- Province: Saskatchewan
- Region: Southwest
- Rural municipality: Clinworth No. 230
- Restructured (Hamlet): January 1, 1951

Government
  - Governing body: Clinworth No. 230
  - MLA: Doug Steele
  - MP: Jeremy Patzer
- Time zone: CST
- Area code: 306
- Highways: Highway 32; Highway 649
- Railways: Great Western Railway

Lemsford is an unincorporated hamlet in the Rural Municipality of Clinworth No. 230, Saskatchewan, Canada. It previously held the status of village until January 1, 1951. The hamlet is located 42 km east of the town of Leader at the intersection of Highway 32 and Highway 649. The hamlet is also serviced by the Great Western Railway.

== History ==
Prior to January 1, 1951, Lemsford was incorporated as a village, and was restructured as a hamlet under the jurisdiction of the Rural municipality of Clinworth on that date.

== Infrastructure ==
- Lemsford Ferry, located 21 km north of Lemsford on highway 649.
- Great Western Railway, a Canadian short line railway company operating on former Canadian Pacific Railway trackage in southwest Saskatchewan.

== See also ==
- List of communities in Saskatchewan
- List of hamlets in Saskatchewan
