= Rural Municipality of Miry Creek No. 229 =

Rural municipality in Saskatchewan, Canada

Miry Creek No. 229
- Rural municipality
- Rural Municipality of Miry Creek No. 229

- Location of the RM of Miry Creek No. 229 in Saskatchewan
- Coordinates: 50.896°N 108.672°W
- Country: Canada
- Province: Saskatchewan
- Census division: 8
- SARM division: 3
- Formed: January 1, 1913

Government
  - Reeve: Mark Hughes
  - Governing body: RM of Miry Creek No. 229 Council
  - Administrator: Karen Paz
  - Office location: Abbey

Area (2016)
  - Land: 1,221.15 km^{2} (471.49 sq mi)

Population (2016)
  - Total: 370
  - Density: 0.3/km^{2} (0.78/sq mi)
- Time zone: CST
  - Summer (DST): CST
- Area codes: 306 and 639

The Rural Municipality of Miry Creek No. 229 (2016 population: 370) is a rural municipality (RM) in the Canadian province of Saskatchewan within Census Division No. 8 and SARM Division No. 3.

== History ==
The RM of Miry Creek No. 229 incorporated as a rural municipality on January 1, 1913. The first homestead occurred in 1907. The Canadian Pacific Railway expanded westward in the RM from Cabri in 1913.

== Geography ==
=== Communities and localities ===
The following urban municipalities are surrounded by the RM.

Villages

- Abbey
- Lancer

The following unincorporated communities are within the RM.

Special service areas

- Shackleton

Localities

- Abbey Colony
- Waldensian Valley
- Wheatland Colony

== Demographics ==
Population history (1981–2016)
Year	Pop.	±%
1981	544	—
1986	555	+2.0%
1991	586	+5.6%
1996	600	+2.4%
2001	573	−4.5%
2006	458	−20.1%
2011	374	−18.3%
2016	370	−1.1%
Source: Statistics Canada via Saskatchewan Bureau of Statistics

In the 2021 Census of Population conducted by Statistics Canada, the RM of Miry Creek No. 229 had a population of 378 living in 95 of its 115 total private dwellings, a change of 2.2% from its 2016 population of 370. With a land area of 1,227.72 km^{2} (474.03 sq mi), it had a population density of 0.3/km^{2} (0.8/sq mi) in 2021.

In the 2016 Census of Population, the RM of Miry Creek No. 229 recorded a population of 370 living in 106 of its 127 total private dwellings, a −3.6% change from its 2011 population of 384. With a land area of 1,221.15 km^{2} (471.49 sq mi), it had a population density of 0.3/km^{2} (0.8/sq mi) in 2016.

== Economy ==
Agriculture and natural gas are the major industries in the RM.

== Government ==
The RM of Miry Creek No. 229 is governed by an elected municipal council and an appointed administrator that meets on the second Thursday of every month. The reeve of the RM is Mark Hughes while its administrator is Karen Paz. The RM's office is located in Abbey.
