= Mendham, Saskatchewan =

Village in Saskatchewan, Canada

Village of Mendham
- Village
- Location of Mendham in Saskatchewan Village of Mendham (Canada)
- Coordinates: 50.772°N 109.664°W
- Country: Canada
- Province: Saskatchewan
- Region: Southwest
- Census division: 8
- Rural municipality: Happyland No. 231
- Post office Founded: N/A
- Incorporated (Village): N/A
- Incorporated (Town): N/A

Government
  - Mayor: Kevin Angerman
  - Administrator: Lucein Stuebing
  - Governing body: Mendham Village Council

Area
  - Total: 0.50 km^{2} (0.19 sq mi)

Population (2006)
  - Total: 45
  - Density: 79.4/km^{2} (206/sq mi)
- Time zone: CST
- Postal code: S0N 1P0
- Area code: 306
- Highways: Highway

Mendham (2016 population: 30) is a village in the Canadian province of Saskatchewan within the Rural Municipality of Happyland No. 231 and Census Division No. 8.

== History ==
Mendham incorporated as a village on April 1, 1930.

== Demographics ==
Population history (1981–2016)
Year	Pop.	±%
1981	109	—
1986	103	−5.5%
1991	43	−58.3%
1996	53	+23.3%
2001	40	−24.5%
2006	35	−12.5%
2011	35	+0.0%
2016	30	−14.3%
Source: Statistics Canada via Saskatchewan Bureau of Statistics

In the 2021 Census of Population conducted by Statistics Canada, Mendham had a population of 25 living in 12 of its 17 total private dwellings, a change of −16.7% from its 2016 population of 30. With a land area of 0.59 km^{2} (0.23 sq mi), it had a population density of 42.4/km^{2} (109.7/sq mi) in 2021.

In the 2016 Census of Population, the Village of Mendham recorded a population of 30 living in 14 of its 20 total private dwellings, a −16.7% change from its 2011 population of 35. With a land area of 0.5 km^{2} (0.19 sq mi), it had a population density of 60.0/km^{2} (155.4/sq mi) in 2016.

== Notable people ==
- Ernie Moser — Former professional ice hockey player

== See also ==
- List of communities in Saskatchewan
- List of villages in Saskatchewan
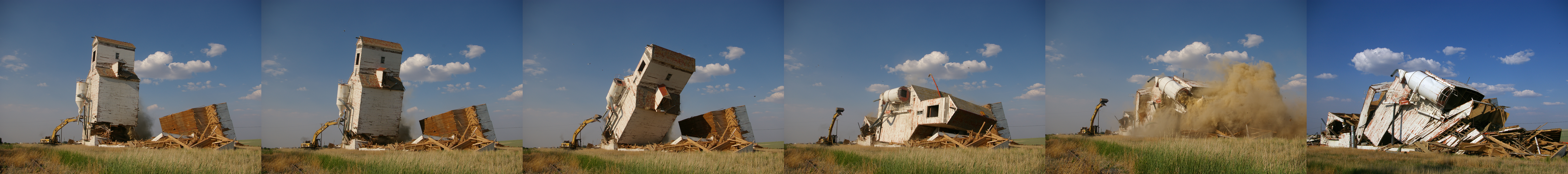
Demolition of Mendham's last grain elevator
