= Abbey, Saskatchewan =

Village in Saskatchewan, Canada

Abbey
- Village
- Village of Abbey
- Location within Saskatchewan Location within Canada
- Coordinates: 50°44′13″N 108°45′27″W
- Country: Canada
- Province: Saskatchewan
- Region: Southwest
- Census division: 8
- Rural Municipality: Miry Creek No. 229
- Post office founded: August 1, 1913
- Incorporated (village): September 2, 1913

Government
  - Governing body: Abbey Village Council
  - Mayor: Kent Haggart
  - Administrator: Karen Paz

Area
  - Total: 0.73 km^{2} (0.28 sq mi)
- Elevation: 681 m (2,235 ft)

Population (2021)
  - Total: 100
  - Density: 137.6/km^{2} (356/sq mi)
- Time zone: UTC-06:00 (CST)
- Postal code: S0N 0A0
- Area code: 306
- Highways: Highway 32; Highway 783

Abbey (2021 population: 122) is a village in the Canadian province of Saskatchewan within the Rural Municipality of Miry Creek No. 229 and Census Division No. 8. This village is in the south-western region of the province, north-west of the city of Swift Current. Abbey is serviced by Highway 32 near Highway 738.

== History ==
In 1910, the first post office used by area residents was Longworth, located in the home of Cassie Baldwin. The townsite of Abbey was originally owned by a man named D.F. Kennedy. In 1913, the Canadian Pacific Railway (CPR) bought a quarter section of land from him to build a rail line. The CPR gave Mr. Kennedy the honour of naming the community, giving it the name Abbey - the name of the Kennedy farm in Ireland. Abbey incorporated as a village on September 2, 1913.

=== Abbey Fire Hall ===
Abbey has one municipal heritage property on the Canadian Register of Historic Places, the Abbey Fire Hall. Constructed in 1919 in response to a large fire that threatened the community in September 1918, the fire station was part of an upgrade to fire protection in Abbey. The station remained in service until a new fire station was constructed in 1975. The station is currently not in use, however the siren on the station tower is still used to signal emergencies in the community.

== Parks and recreation ==
Abbey Golf Club is a golf course about 0.5 km (0.31 mi) south-east of Abbey. It was built in 1950 and is a par 35, 9-hole course with sand greens and a total length of 2,085 yards.

== Demographics ==
Population history (1981–2016)
Year	Pop.	±%
1981	218	—
1986	198	−9.2%
1991	190	−4.0%
1996	162	−14.7%
2001	137	−15.4%
2006	130	−5.1%
2011	115	−11.5%
2016	129	+12.2%
2021	100	−22.5%
Source: Statistics Canada via Saskatchewan Bureau of Statistics

In the 2021 Census of Population conducted by Statistics Canada, Abbey had a population of 100 living in 59 of its 85 total private dwellings, a change of −22.5% from its 2016 population of 129. With a land area of 0.73 km^{2} (0.28 sq mi), it had a population density of 137.0/km^{2} (354.8/sq mi) in 2021.

In the 2016 Census of Population, the Village of Abbey recorded a population of 129 living in 65 of its 88 total private dwellings, a 10.9% change from its 2011 population of 115. With a land area of 0.77 km^{2} (0.30 sq mi), it had a population density of 167.5/km^{2} in 2016.

== Geography ==
Abbey is located south of the South Saskatchewan River and north of the Great Sand Hills

=== Climate ===
Abbey experiences a semi-arid climate (Köppen climate classification BSk) with long, cold, dry winters and short, warm summers. Precipitation is low, with an annual average of 316.2 mm (12.45 in), and is concentrated in the warmer months.

Climate data for Abbey Climate ID: 4020020; coordinates 50°42′N 108°47′W; elevation: 694.9 m (2,280 ft); 1981-2010 normals
Month	Jan	Feb	Mar	Apr	May	Jun	Jul	Aug	Sep	Oct	Nov	Dec	Year
Record high °C (°F)	13.9 (57.0)	17.0 (62.6)	25.0 (77.0)	31.5 (88.7)	35.0 (95.0)	39.0 (102.2)	39.0 (102.2)	41.1 (106.0)	37.8 (100.0)	33.9 (93.0)	25.0 (77.0)	16.0 (60.8)	41.1 (106.0)
Mean daily maximum °C (°F)	−6.3 (20.7)	−3.3 (26.1)	3.3 (37.9)	12.5 (54.5)	18.6 (65.5)	22.8 (73.0)	26.6 (79.9)	26.1 (79.0)	19.5 (67.1)	12.0 (53.6)	1.4 (34.5)	−4.6 (23.7)	10.7 (51.3)
Mean daily minimum °C (°F)	−16.1 (3.0)	−13.3 (8.1)	−7.0 (19.4)	−0.7 (30.7)	4.9 (40.8)	9.5 (49.1)	12.0 (53.6)	11.3 (52.3)	5.8 (42.4)	−0.5 (31.1)	−8.3 (17.1)	−14.3 (6.3)	−1.4 (29.5)
Record low °C (°F)	−43.3 (−45.9)	−42.0 (−43.6)	−35.0 (−31.0)	−20.0 (−4.0)	−11.0 (12.2)	−4.0 (24.8)	2.5 (36.5)	0.0 (32.0)	−7.8 (18.0)	−27.0 (−16.6)	−36.0 (−32.8)	−44.0 (−47.2)	−44.0 (−47.2)
Average precipitation mm (inches)	10.6 (0.42)	8.3 (0.33)	14.6 (0.57)	20.9 (0.82)	41.0 (1.61)	72.1 (2.84)	46.6 (1.83)	35.5 (1.40)	27.0 (1.06)	14.1 (0.56)	12.1 (0.48)	13.3 (0.52)	316.2 (12.45)
Average rainfall mm (inches)	0.0 (0.0)	0.2 (0.01)	3.0 (0.12)	13.7 (0.54)	37.6 (1.48)	72.1 (2.84)	46.6 (1.83)	35.5 (1.40)	25.2 (0.99)	8.1 (0.32)	1.7 (0.07)	0.3 (0.01)	244.0 (9.61)
Average snowfall cm (inches)	10.6 (4.2)	8.1 (3.2)	11.6 (4.6)	7.3 (2.9)	3.4 (1.3)	0.0 (0.0)	0.0 (0.0)	0.0 (0.0)	1.8 (0.7)	6.1 (2.4)	10.4 (4.1)	13.0 (5.1)	72.2 (28.4)
Average precipitation days (≥ 0.2 mm)	3.9	2.6	3.8	4.1	6.1	8.4	6.3	5.0	4.5	3.3	3.6	4.3	55.8
Average rainy days (≥ 0.2 mm)	0.04	0.08	0.44	3.00	5.60	8.40	6.30	5.00	4.40	2.00	0.52	0.12	35.80
Average snowy days (≥ 0.2 cm)	3.90	2.50	3.40	1.40	0.74	0.00	0.00	0.00	0.22	1.40	3.20	4.20	20.90
Source: Environment and Climate Change Canada

== See also ==
- List of communities in Saskatchewan
- List of villages in Saskatchewan
