= Hazlet, Saskatchewan =

Village in Saskatchewan, Canada

Hazlet
- Village
- Village of Hazlet
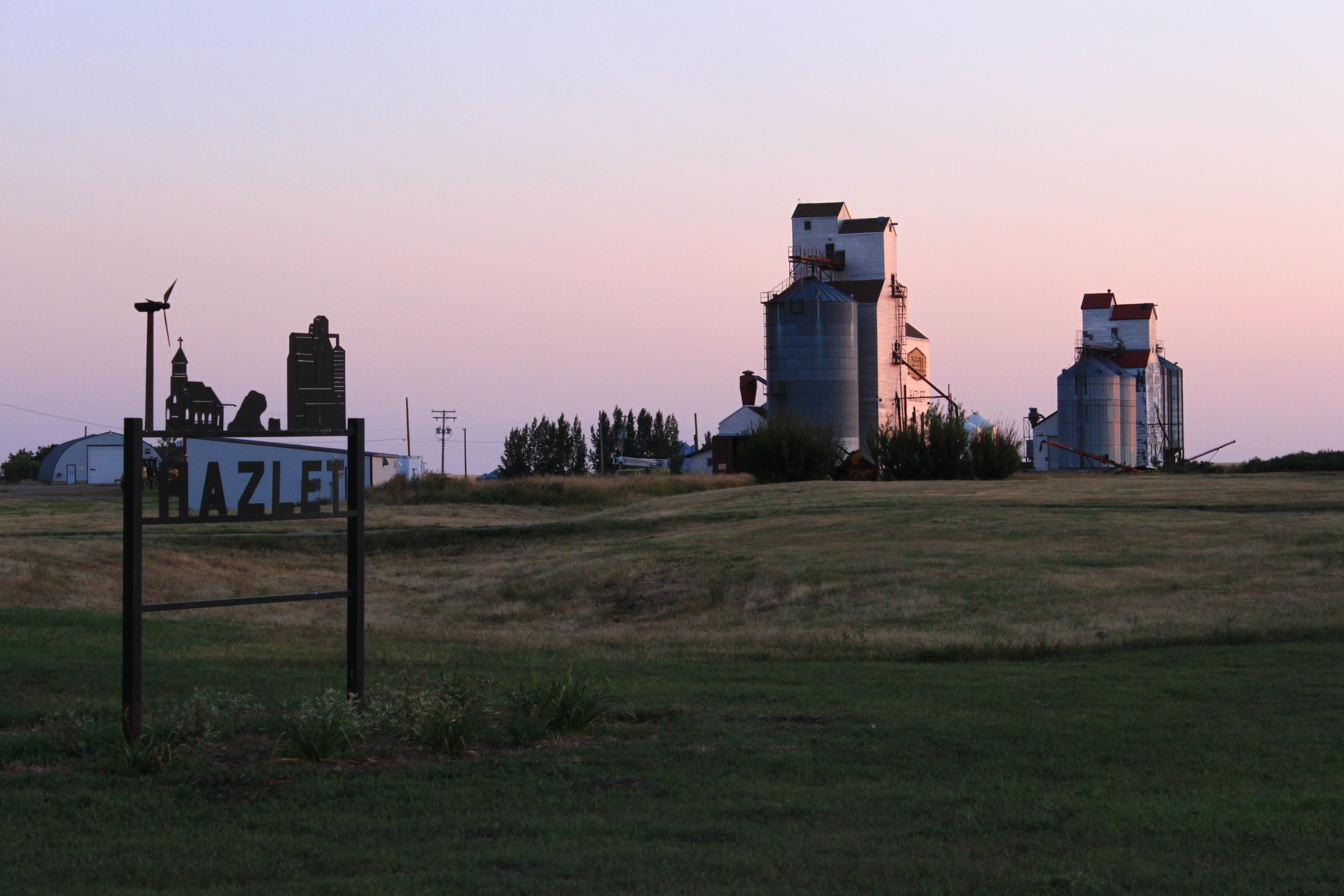
- Motto(s): Proud of our past, looking forward to our future
- Location within Pittville No. 169 Location within Saskatchewan
- Coordinates: 50°23′59″N 108°35′39″W
- Country: Canada
- Province: Saskatchewan
- Region: Southwest
- Rural municipality: Pittville No. 169
- Incorporated (Village): 1928

Government
  - Type: Municipal
  - Governing body: Hazlet Village Council
  - Mayor: Terry Bailey
  - Administrator: Terry Erdelyan
  - MLA: Doug Steele
  - MP: Jeremy Patzer

Area
  - Land: 0.55 km^{2} (0.21 sq mi)

Population (2021)
  - Total: 90
  - Density: 163.7/km^{2} (424/sq mi)
- Time zone: UTC−6 (CST)
- Postal code: S0N 1E0
- Area codes: 306, 639
- Highways: Highway 332 / Highway 633
- Railways: Canadian Pacific Railway
- Website: Village of Hazlet

Hazlet (2021 population: 90) is a village in the Canadian province of Saskatchewan within the Rural Municipality of Pittville No. 169 and Census Division No. 8. The village is located northwest of the city of Swift Current near the Great Sand Hills.

== Demographics ==
Population history (1981–2021)
Year	Pop.	±%
1981	132	—
1986	160	+21.2%
1991	129	−19.4%
1996	120	−7.0%
2001	126	+5.0%
2006	85	−32.5%
2011	95	+11.8%
2016	106	+11.6%
2021	90	−15.1%
Source: Statistics Canada via Saskatchewan Bureau of Statistics

In the 2021 Census of Population conducted by Statistics Canada, Hazlet had a population of 90 living in 43 of its 61 total private dwellings, a change of −15.1% from its 2016 population of 106. With a land area of 0.55 km^{2} (0.21 sq mi), it had a population density of 163.6/km^{2} (423.8/sq mi) in 2021.

In the 2016 Census of Population, the Village of Hazlet recorded a population of 106 living in 48 of its 59 total private dwellings, a 10.4% change from its 2011 population of 95. With a land area of 0.55 km^{2} (0.21 sq mi), it had a population density of 192.7/km^{2} (499.2/sq mi) in 2016.

== History ==
Hazlet was founded in 1928 after the arrival of the Canadian Pacific Railway. Hazlet incorporated as a village on January 1, 1963.

== Economy ==
Hazlet's economy is driven mostly by agriculture, raising cattle/bison, and energy including oil and natural gas. Oil and gas exploration provides a substantial economic contribution to the village and surrounding area. Hazlet has its school involved in an International School program, where it host students from other countries who desire education with English instruction. This international school also contributes to the local economy.

== Baseball ==
Baseball has been a part of the Hazlet and surrounding community since the 1920s. Hazlet has had great senior teams such as the Hazlet Blackhawks of the 1930s and 1940s and the Hazlet Elks of the 1960s, 1970s and 1980s. The earliest record of an organized team is in 1935, but baseball was being played in and around Hazlet much earlier than that. In 1938 the team won 57 out of 64 games and won nine tournaments including their own. That year six players had batting averages over .400. Hazlet also had great women's teams such as the Hazlet Hornets Ball team. Hazlet continued to have a women's team until the 1990s. Minor baseball has always been popular, and kids still play baseball and slo-pitch today. Without the development of these young players, Hazlet would not have been able to dominate the South River Baseball League as they did in the 1970s and early 1980s, winning several league championships. The community of Hazlet was inducted into the Saskatchewan Baseball Hall of Fame at a ceremony on August 17, 2013 in Battleford, Saskatchewan.

=== Hazlet Elks ===
The Hazlet Elks were a senior baseball team that played in Hazlet until 1993. From 1982 to 1993 they played in the Saskatchewan Major Baseball League. They won league championships in 1987, 1988, and 1989.

=== South River Baseball League ===
The Hazlet Elks played in the South River Baseball League until 1981. Other teams in the league included Gull Lake, Climax, Frontier, and Shaunavon. The Elks had enormous success in this league winning several championships in the 1970s. The Elks won consecutive championships in 1979, 1980, and 1981. In 1981 Hazlet beat the Unity Cardinals in tournament play, a team that had nine American import players on the roster. It was decided that Hazlet needed to play in a more competitive league. In October 1981 the Hazlet Elks were accepted into the Saskatchewan Major Baseball League.

=== Saskatchewan Major Baseball League ===
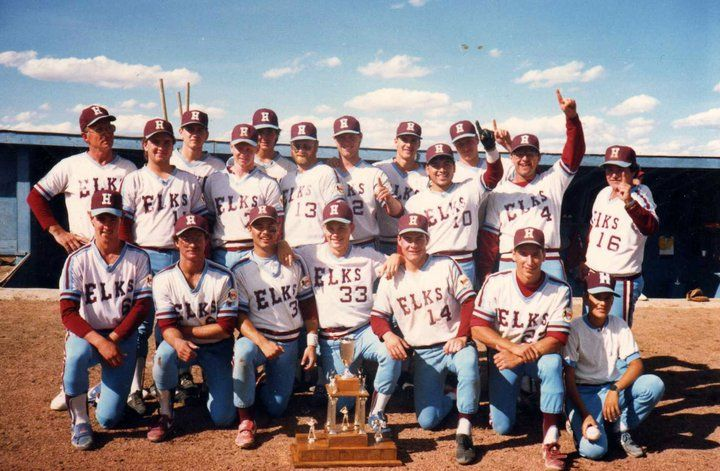
1987 SMBL Championship

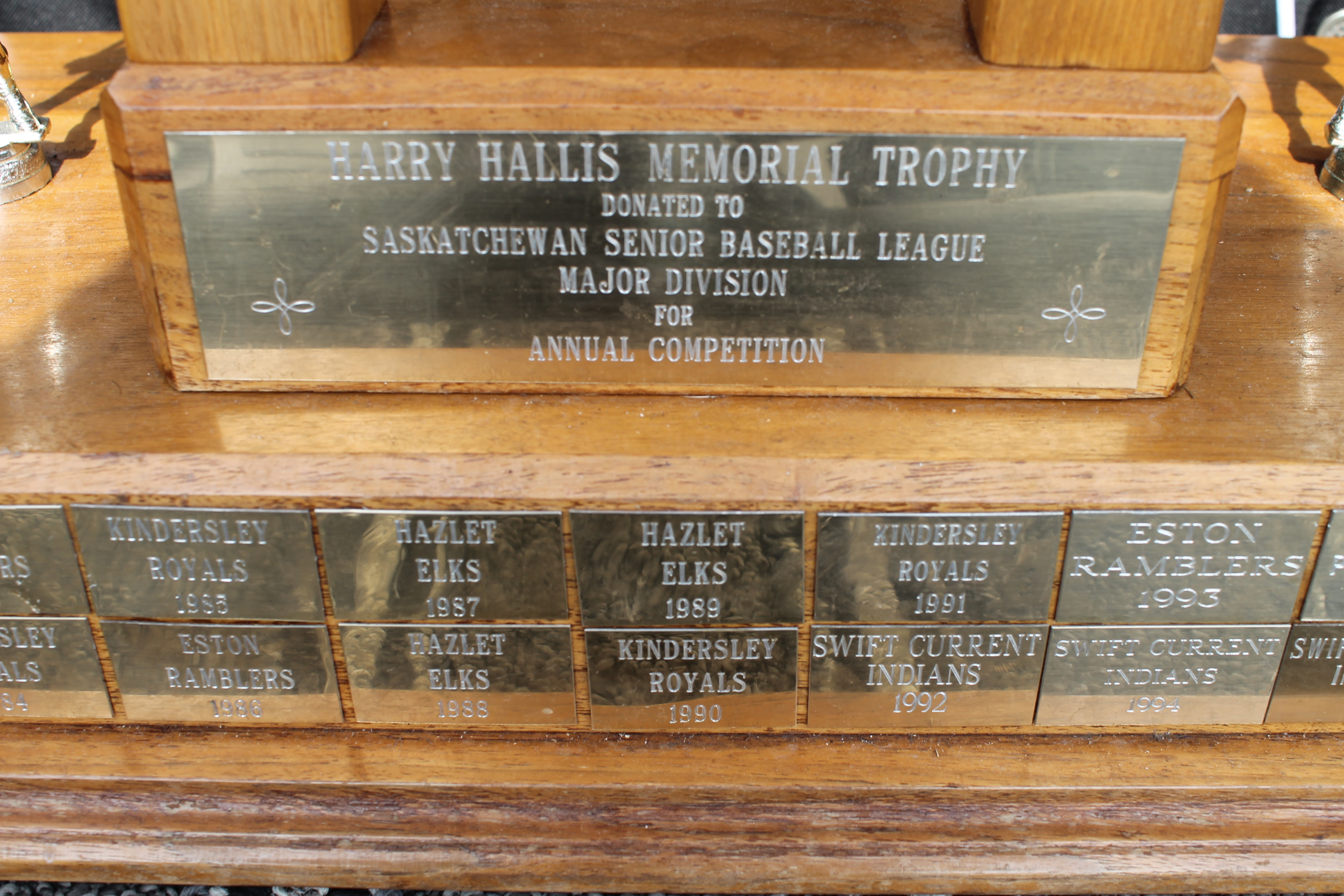
Harry Hallis Memorial Trophy

The Saskatchewan Major Baseball League (SMBL) was the highest level of collegiate summer baseball played in Saskatchewan up until the year 2000 when the name was changed to the Western Major Baseball League. Other teams included the Regina Red Sox, Moose Jaw Astros, Kindersley Royals, Saskatoon Liners, Eston Ramblers, Saskatoon Nationals, Oyen Pronghorns, and the Unity Cardinals. 1982 was the first year in the SMBL, and their first game attracted over 400 fans. The team finished last in the league that year. In 1983 and 1984 they lost in the league final. It was in 1987 the Elks won their first league championship by defeating the Kindersley Royals. The Hazlet Elks went on to three-peat as SMBL champions by taking the league title in 1987, 1988, and 1989. The achievements of this team were notable as the population of Hazlet was around 125 people. It was truly a community effort to make the team viable. An executive of 14 members helped co-ordinate volunteer hours by themselves and others in the community. Among these were Vince Akre, Don Anderson, Terry Bailey, Bill Boss, Peter Buchanan, Donnie Knutson, Harvey McIntosh, Sandy Starkey, Barry Stock, Mark Stock, Lyle Thoreson, and Donnie Zinn. Larry English was the general manager. They were competing against cities and towns in Saskatchewan that were several times the population of Hazlet. Hazlet was the smallest town to ever compete in this league. The Hazlet Elks had seven future Major League Baseball players or draft picks on their roster including Gerald Wagner, Steve Reed, Vince Shinholster, Willie Hysaw, Greg Mathews, Kurt Mattson, and Kernan Ronan. Steve Reed had the best major league career as a pitcher, playing for several teams in his 14-year Major League Baseball career. Greg Mathews played seven years in the majors for two different teams. Other future major league players that signed with the Elks but never played include Mark McGwire, Randy Johnson, and Cory Snyder. Larry English was the scout for the Elks, and also had a career as a scout for the Minnesota Twins for five years. Because of the small population of Hazlet, the team was allowed to have four American imports on their roster. It was partly because of these imports that Hazlet was able to remain competitive, even against larger centres in the league. Hazlet attracted fans from all over southwest Saskatchewan to see the highest level of baseball being played in the province.

=== SMBL record ===
- 1982 Missed the playoffs
- 1983 Lost in league final
- 1984 Lost in league final
- 1985 Lost in league semi-final
- 1986 Lost in league semi-final
- 1987 Won league championship
- 1988 Won league championship
- 1989 Won league championship
- 1990 Lost in playoffs
- 1991 Lost in playoffs
- 1992 Lost in league final
- 1993 Missed the playoffs

== Service clubs ==
=== Hazlet Legion Branch 202 ===
The first organization of the Hazlet Branch 202 was on February 1, 1936. Those appointed were Leslie Colter, Rudolph Stock, Frank Dyball, John H. Boyer, Arthur E. Todd, Percy Pyne, Charles W. Perry, Charles J. Herriott, William T. Vilness, Ralph S. Bingham, John Munt, Joseph F. McAdam, Walter Weedon, Edward I. Olson, and Oscar A. Sannes, with J. H. Boyer as Secretary. Branch 202 was re-organized in 1946, and the charter members were Frank McAdam, Leslie Colter, Owen Olsgard, Orland Robertson, George Bell, John McIver, and W. J. Burak. The first recorded meeting was on November 5, 1946 in the McCabe grain elevator office with President Owen Olsgard, Secretary/Treasurer Frank McAdam and eight members present. The first project was a dance on May 30, 1947 with net proceeds of $29.18. The attention then turned to the construction of a monument to servicemen from Hazlet and area who had made the supreme sacrifice. The monument was completed in 1948 and still stands today on Railway Street in Hazlet.

In 1948, the Legion formed a softball team and actively supported a ladies' team. The Legion teams existed for several years and each year held a sports day tournament. A meeting place for the Legion was a problem, so in 1949, a clubroom was set up in the basement of the Community Hall. This was used as the meeting place until August 1950, when Maurice Akre offered the use of his poolroom. This continued as their meeting place for seven years, with free use of the pool tables included. The first annual dance for the Branch was on October 26, 1951. Admission was 50 cents per person; the orchestra fee was $55.00, hall rent of $15.00, and the net profit for the evening was $4.00. Other firsts for the Branch are: first annual Legion bonspiel on March 3, 1954; first entry to the Legion Curling playoffs in 1955; first Legion carnival in 1957; first turkey bingo in 1957; and first annual Legion deep-pit barbecue in 1966. The carnivals were held annually for seven years while turkey bingos continued for thirteen years. The deep-pit barbecues reached twenty years annually in 1985. The barbecue in 1978, which was Hazlet’s 50th Anniversary year, had the largest attendance, catering to approximately 1,100 people in one hour. In 1956, they purchased the Trent School for $3.00. A concrete basement was poured on November 10, 1956, and the first meeting in the Legion Hall was on February 14, 1957, in their own Legion Hall.

In 2004, the Hazlet Legion made the decision to close the Legion Hall due to the increasing costs of maintaining it, and the limited use of the building. Meetings are now held in the local Café. In 2005, the Hazlet Ladies' Auxiliary joined the Legion to bring their experience and much welcomed comradeship to Hazlet Branch's small group.

=== Hazlet Lions Club ===
The Hazlet Lions Club has been a cornerstone of public service to Hazlet and the surrounding community for generations. The Lions club has supported numerous activities over the years including the Sandhills Relay, Youth Exchange students, dances, parades, pancake breakfasts, cabarets, curling, and other sporting events. They have sponsored numerous sports teams and youth activities in the community.

=== UCAL Women's Group ===
The United Catholic Anglican Lutheran Church women's group has supported events in Hazlet for generations. They have frequently supported fundraising events, teas, bake sales, trade shows, community gatherings, and Bingos.

== Medicare ==
Hazlet was a world pioneer in providing universal healthcare. In 1944 The Swift Current area was slated to be the demonstration unit for preventive medicine. The RM of Pittville at Hazlet already had a health scheme, devised by William J. Burak, whereby its residents received both medical and hospital care for just under $11 per person per year. Wishing to add the Pittville method of full medical care to the preventive program planned for the southwest, Burak wrote at his own expense to each municipality, town and village, visited each weekly newspaper editor, and called a public meeting to press for a full medical and hospital plan. When a vote of all ratepayers was held on November 26, 1945, a majority voted in favour of a full regional health plan.

The Saskatchewan government, manoeuvred by Burak into initiating a more comprehensive scheme than the preventive medicine program it had planned, passed an Order-in-Council on December 11. The region's hospitalization and health care scheme took effect on July 1, 1946—a full two years before Great Britain's "cradle to the grave" health care plan was implemented. Within the Swift Current Health Region (Saskatchewan's Health Region #1) the residents felt empowered, and the region assembled statistical data on the costs of health care that were unrivalled in Canada. The regional scheme flowered when Dr. Vince Matthews, the public health officer, provided seamless integration of preventive work and medical care, a first in Canada. There was a high level of rapport between the local administration, the constituent municipalities, patients, and physicians: Stewart Robertson, the administrator, Dr. Vince Matthews, and Dr. Cas Wolan, president of the district medical association, met informally most days for coffee. In 1951, Swift Current created the first regional hospital board in Canada.

== Wind power ==
In 2009 the community of Hazlet undertook a project to create the first wind powered recreation complex in Canada. It became operational in November 2010. During the winter, it provides power to the community ice rink and during the summer, electricity is fed back into the electrical grid.

== Hazlet Regional Park ==
Hazlet Regional Park (50.4071°N 108.6471°W) is a regional park located about 5 kilometres (3.1 mi) north-west of Hazlet at the eastern edge of the Great Sand Hills in the RM of Pittville No. 169. The park is situated on a man-made reservoir and has a campground, picnic area, and a golf course. Hilltop Golf Course is a 9-hole sand green course located on the east side of the lake. The remainder of the park amenities are located on the west side. Access to the park is from Highway 332.

To create a reliable water supply during the Dust Bowl of the 1930s, an earthen dam was built creating Hazlet Reservoir. Construction began with men, horses, and scrapers on 2 June 1937 and was completed 11 days later. In the spring of 1960, a committee was formed to look into the idea of forming a regional park at the Hazlet Reservoir. Regional park status was applied for, and was received in the fall of 1960 making it one of the original regional parks in the province. The first trees were planted in 1961 with more plantings in the following years. The park soon had playground equipment, a cook house, benches, sun shades, and a golf course.

== Attractions and amenities ==
The community rink complex is one of the most used facilities in town. Home of the curling rink, skating rink, and lounge, the building is used not only in the winter, but all year round. During the winter, there is always a different curling tournament, from ladies, to mixed, to even high school tournaments and regional curling. The skating part is used everyday in the winter, as there is power skating, skating lessons, public skating, and hockey games for all ages. The lounge is the newest addition to the complex.

About 6 kilometres (3.7 mi) west of Hazlet is an historic site known as Standing Rock. Standing Rock is a large glacial erratic left from the last ice age around 14,000 years ago.

== See also ==
- List of villages in Saskatchewan
- List of communities in Saskatchewan
