= Prelate, Saskatchewan =

Village in Saskatchewan, Canada

Prelate
- Special service area
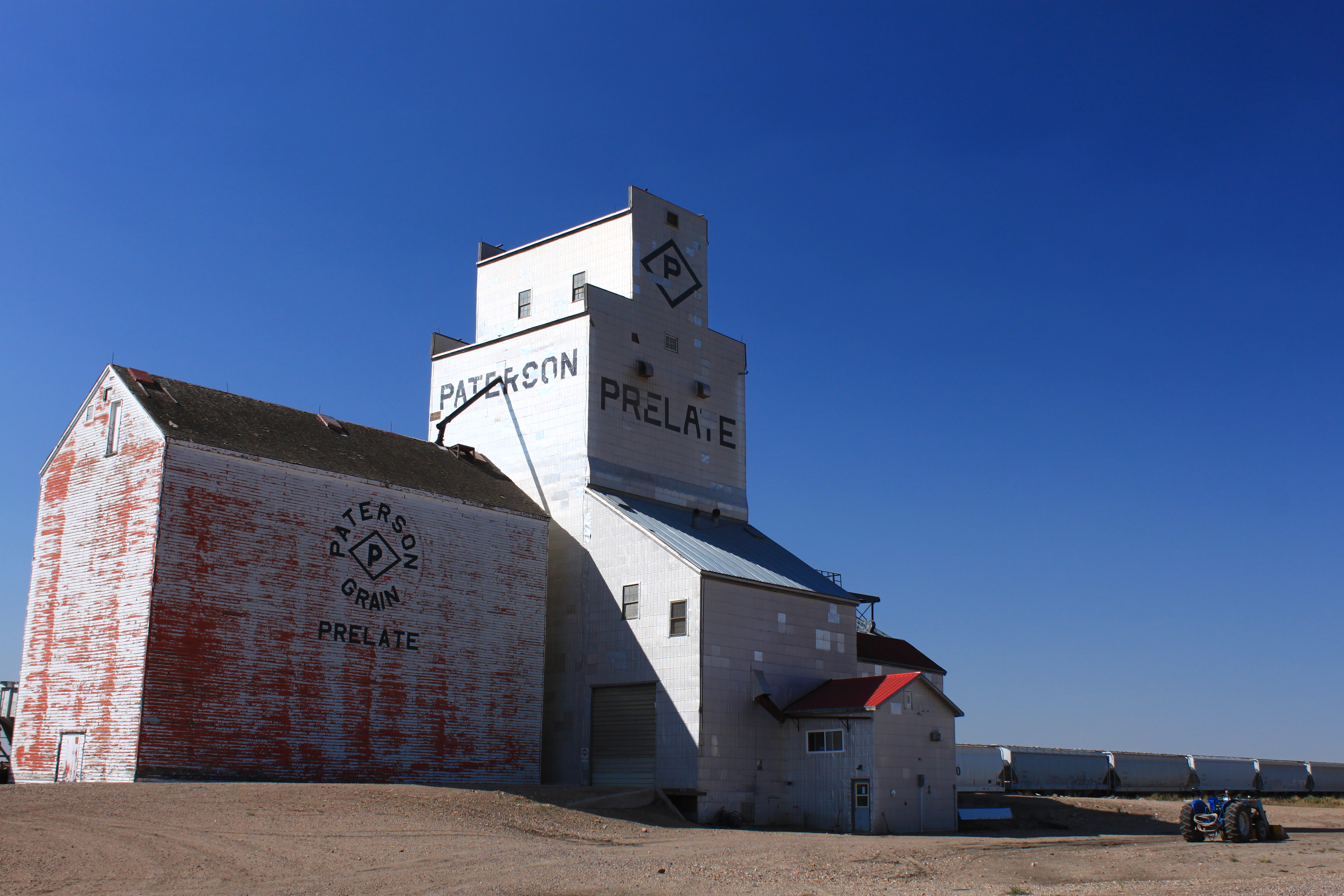
- Grain elevator in Prelate

- Location within Saskatchewan Location within Canada
- Coordinates: 50.852°N 109.409°W
- Country: Canada
- Province: Saskatchewan
- Region: South-west Saskatchewan
- Census division: 8
- Rural Municipality: Happyland
- Settled: 1908
- Village (incorporated): 1913
- Post office founded: 1914
- Special service area (dissolved): July 1, 2024

Government
  - Reeve: Anthony Wagner
  - SSA Councillor: Bradley Goldade
  - Administrator: Kim Lacelle
  - Governing Council: R.M. of Happyland #231 Council

Area
  - Total: 0.87 km^{2} (0.34 sq mi)

Population (2021)
  - Total: 116
  - Density: 144.5/km^{2} (374/sq mi)
- Time zone: CST
- Postal code: S0N 2B0
- Area code: 306
- Highways: Highway 32

Prelate (2021 pop.: 116) is a special service area in the Canadian province of Saskatchewan within the Rural Municipality of Happyland No. 231 and Census Division No. 8. Formerly an incorporated village, it is 12 kilometres (7.5 mi) east of Leader and 146 kilometres (91 mi) northwest of Swift Current just off Highway 32.

== History ==
Prelate was first settled in 1908. Prelate incorporated as a village on October 25, 1913. It dissolved on July 1, 2024 becoming a special service area under the jurisdiction of the Rural Municipality of Happyland No. 231.

Historical sites

- St. Angela's Convent and St. Angela's Academy of Prelate was founded in 1919. The boarding school for girls was run by the Ursuline Sisters until it closed in 2007.
- Saints Peter and Paul Church (Blumenfeld Church) located 15 km south of Prelate is a Municipal Heritage Property. Built in 1915, the church served the Catholics of German descent of the Prelate area. The grounds feature a fieldstone shrine and wrought iron crosses mark some of the graves in the cemetery.

== Demographics ==
Population history (1981–2016)
Year	Pop.	±%
1981	317	—
1986	254	−19.9%
1991	191	−24.8%
1996	189	−1.0%
2001	164	−13.2%
2006	126	−23.2%
2011	124	−1.6%
2016	154	+24.2%
Source: Statistics Canada via Saskatchewan Bureau of Statistics

In the 2021 Census of Population conducted by Statistics Canada, Prelate had a population of 116 living in 52 of its 60 total private dwellings, a change of −24.7% from its 2016 population of 154. With a land area of 0.82 km^{2} (0.32 sq mi), it had a population density of 141.5/km^{2} (366.4/sq mi) in 2021.

In the 2016 Census of Population, the Village of Prelate recorded a population of 154 living in 62 of its 77 total private dwellings, a 19.5% change from its 2011 population of 124. With a land area of 0.87 km^{2} (0.34 sq mi), it had a population density of 177.0/km^{2} (458.5/sq mi) in 2016.

== Education ==
The Islamic Academy of Saskatchewan, an Islamic boarding school for boys, opened in 2011 in the former St. Angela's Convent and Academy building. (Current Status: Unknown). Youth in Prelate attend school at Leader Composite School in Leader, Saskatchewan.

== Notable people ==
- Ross Alger, politician
- Roxanne Goldade, country singer
- Mark Pederson, ice hockey left winger
- David Herle, Liberal political advisor

== See also ==
- List of communities in Saskatchewan
- List of villages in Saskatchewan
