= Cabri, Saskatchewan =

Town in Saskatchewan, Canada

Cabri
- Town
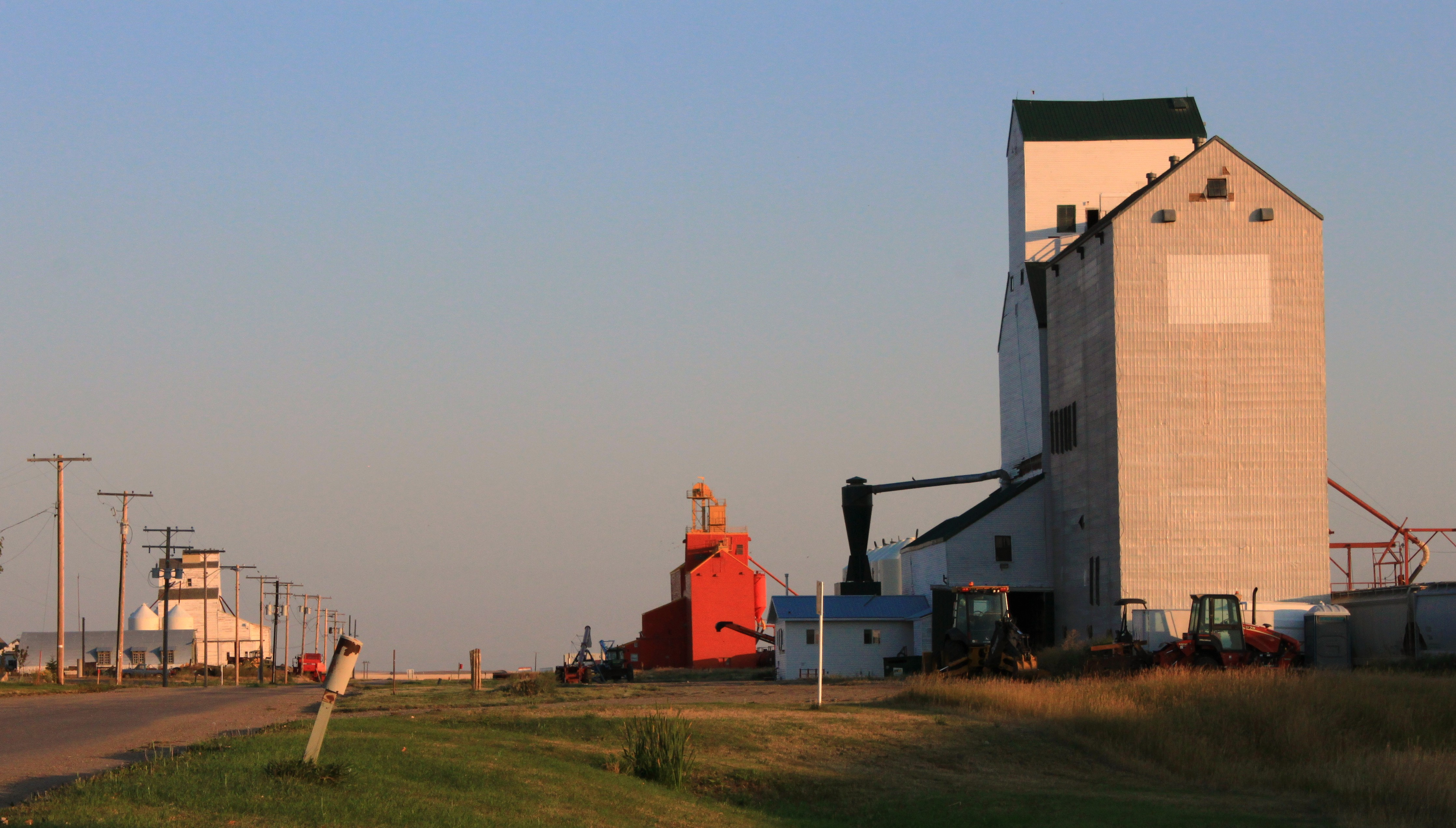
- Grain elevators along Railway Avenue, Cabri.

- Location of Cabri in Saskatchewan Cabri (Canada)
- Coordinates: 50.62°N 108.46°W
- Country: Canada
- Province: Saskatchewan
- Census division: No. 8
- Rural Municipality: Riverside
- Post office established: 1912
- Incorporated (village): May 13, 1912
- Incorporated (town): April 16, 1917

Government
  - Mayor: David Gossard
  - Town Administrator: Dianne Hahn

Area
  - Total: 1.33 km^{2} (0.51 sq mi)

Population (2011)
  - Total: 399
  - Density: 298.9/km^{2} (774/sq mi)
- Time zone: CST
- Postal code: S0N 0J0
- Area code: 306
- Website: www.cabri.ca

Cabri is a town in southwestern Saskatchewan directly north of Gull Lake, northwest of Swift Current and east of the Great Sand Hills. It was incorporated as a village in 1912 and as a town in 1917.

The Cabri ferry started operation in 1912, crossing the South Saskatchewan River between the village of Cabri and the town that is now known as Kyle.

== Name ==
There are several interpretations surrounding the origin of the town's name, all of which revolve around the indigenous pronghorn antelope. Local folklore suggests that it was the early settlers' pronunciation of the First Nations word for "antelope". Another possibility is that it was derived from the Latin word Antilocapridae, the genus to which the pronghorn belongs. Another suggestion is that voyageurs and Metis thought that pronghorns look like goats, and called them "cabri", a French equivalent word for goat.

== Demographics ==
In the 2021 Census of Population conducted by Statistics Canada, Cabri had a population of 413 living in 203 of its 246 total private dwellings, a change of 5.9% from its 2016 population of 390. With a land area of 1.36 km^{2} (0.53 sq mi), it had a population density of 303.7/km^{2} (786.5/sq mi) in 2021.

Canada census – Cabri community profile

	2021	2011
Population	413 (+5.9% from 2016)	399 (-9.1% from 2006)
Land area	1.36 km^{2} (0.53 sq mi)	1.33 km^{2} (0.51 sq mi)
Population density	303.7/km^{2} (787/sq mi)	298.9/km^{2} (774/sq mi)
Median age	52.0 (M: 51.2, F: 52.0)	53.5 (M: 51.9, F: 55.7)
Private dwellings	246 (total) 203 (occupied)	235 (total)
Median household income	$61,200

References: 2021 2011

== Education ==
Cabri School, part of the Chinook School Division, is a small school with about 100 students.

== Transportation ==
Cabri is along Highway 32, which runs from the city of Swift Current to the town of Leader. It is also along the Great Sandhill Railway line from Swift Current to Burstall. There is a small local airport, the Cabri Airport.

== Cabri Area IBA ==
The town of Cabri is at the centre of the Cabri Area (SK 045) Important Bird Area (IBA) of Canada. The IBA is roughly circular in shape and covers an area of 237.36 km^{2} (91.65 sq mi) and spans three RMs: Riverside No. 168, Miry Creek No. 229, and Pittville No. 169. The site is an important habitat for the burrowing owl, ferruginous hawk, Ross's goose, and the mallard duck.

== Notable residents ==
- Bobby Gimby - orchestra leader, trumpeter, and singer/songwriter

== See also ==
- Cabri Regional Park
- List of communities in Saskatchewan
- List of towns in Saskatchewan
