= Battrum =

Village in Saskatchewan, Canada

Coordinates: 50°32′55″N 108°19′55″W

Location of Battrum in Saskatchewan

Battrum is an unincorporated community in the Rural Municipality of Riverside No. 168, Saskatchewan, Canada. The community is approximately 56 kilometres (35 mi) northwest of the city of Swift Current on Highway 32. It is named after William Edward Battrum.

Battrum is home to oil fields owned by Mobil.

== See also ==
- List of communities in Saskatchewan
