= Portreeve, Saskatchewan =

Community in Saskatchewan, Canada

Portreeve
- Unincorporated community
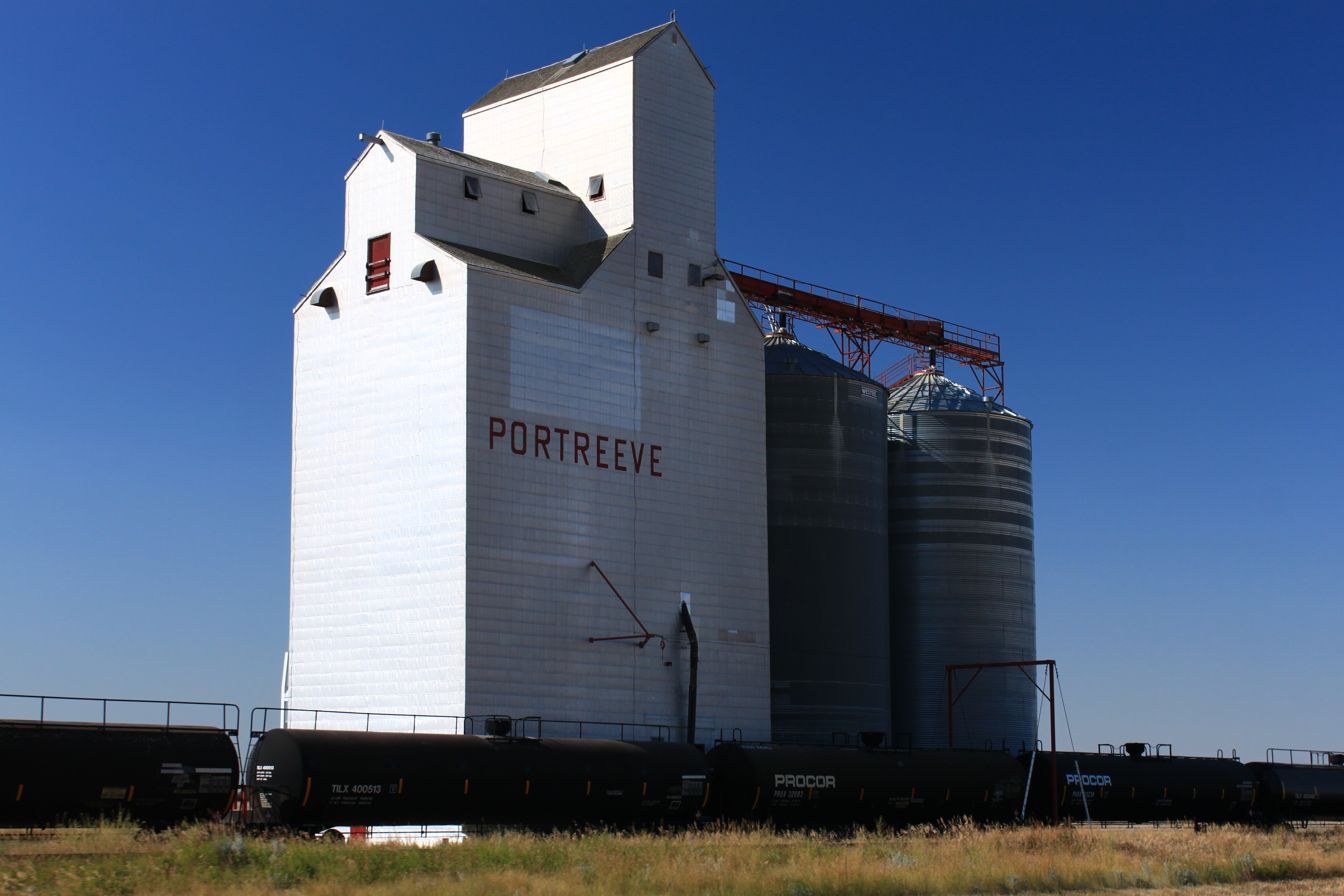
- Former Saskatchewan Wheat Pool Grain elevator in Portreeve

- Location of Portreeve in Saskatchewan Portreeve (Canada)
- Coordinates: 50.823°N 109.010°W
- Country: Canada
- Province: Saskatchewan
- Region: Southwest Saskatchewan
- Census division: 8
- Rural municipality: Clinworth No. 230
- Dissolved: December 31, 1972

Government
  - Governing body: Clinworth No. 230 Council

Population (2016)
  - Total: 5
- Time zone: CST
- Area code: 306
- Highways: Highway 32

Portreeve is an unincorporated in the Rural Municipality of Clinworth No. 230, Saskatchewan, Canada. It previously held the status of village until December 31, 1972. The hamlet is located approximately 114 kilometres (71 mi) northwest of the city of Swift Current on Highway 32.

== History ==
Prior to December 31, 1972, Portreeve was incorporated as a village, and was restructured as an unincorporated community under the jurisdiction of the Rural Municipality of Clinworth No. 230 on that date.

== Demographics ==
Canada census – Portreeve, Saskatchewan community profile

Population
Land area
Population density
Median age
Private dwellings
Median household income

== Notable people ==
- Clint Dunford, Canadian politician

== See also ==
- List of communities in Saskatchewan
