= Shackleton, Saskatchewan =

Community in Saskatchewan, Canada

Shackleton
- Special service area
- Location of Lancer in Saskatchewan Shackleton (Canada)
- Coordinates: 50.411°N 108.360°W
- Country: Canada
- Province: Saskatchewan
- Region: Southwest Saskatchewan
- Census division: 8
- Rural Municipality: Miry Creek
- Dissolved: December 31, 2013

Government
  - Governing body: Miry Creek No. 229 Council

Area
  - Land: 0.66 km^{2} (0.25 sq mi)

Population (2016)
  - Total: 10
  - Density: 15.1/km^{2} (39/sq mi)
- Time zone: CST
- Area code: 306
- Highways: Highway 32
- Website: CommunityProfile

Shackleton is a special service area in the Rural Municipality of Miry Creek No. 229, Saskatchewan, Canada. It previously held the status of village until December 31, 2013. The community is located 81 kilometres (50 mi) northwest of the city of Swift Current on Highway 32.

== History ==
Prior to December 31, 2013, Shackleton was incorporated as a village, and was restructured as a social service area under the jurisdiction of the Rural Municipality of Miry Creek No. 229 on that date.

== Demographics ==
In the 2021 Census of Population conducted by Statistics Canada, Shackleton had a population of 5 living in 4 of its 6 total private dwellings, a change of −50% from its 2016 population of 10. With a land area of 0.72 km^{2} (0.28 sq mi), it had a population density of 6.9/km^{2} (18.0/sq mi) in 2021.

Canada census – Shackleton, Saskatchewan community profile

	2016
Population	10 (0% from 2011)
Land area	0.66 km^{2} (0.25 sq mi)
Population density	15.1/km^{2} (39/sq mi)
Median age	NA (M: NA, F: NA)
Private dwellings	8 (total)
Median household income	$NA

References: 2016

== See also ==
- List of communities in Saskatchewan
- List of hamlets in Saskatchewan
