= Pennant, Saskatchewan =

Village in Saskatchewan, Canada

Village of Pennant
- Village
- Location of Pennant in Saskatchewan Village of Pennant (Canada)
- Coordinates: 50°32′10″N 108°13′48″W
- Country: Canada
- Province: Saskatchewan
- Region: Saskatchewan
- Census division: 8
- Rural Municipality: Riverside
- Incorporated (Village): July 29, 1912

Government
  - Mayor: Leslie Bayliss
  - Administrator: Brandi Trembath
  - Governing body: Pennant Village Council

Area
  - Total: 0.65 km^{2} (0.25 sq mi)

Population (2016)
  - Total: 130
  - Density: 199.8/km^{2} (517/sq mi)
- Time zone: CST
- Postal code: S0N 1X0
- Area code: 306
- Highways: Highway 32 / Highway 632

Pennant (2016 population: 130) is a village in the Canadian province of Saskatchewan within the Rural Municipality of Riverside No. 168 and Census Division No. 8.

== History ==
Pennant was incorporated as a village on July 29, 1912.

== Climate ==
Climate data for Pennant
Month	Jan	Feb	Mar	Apr	May	Jun	Jul	Aug	Sep	Oct	Nov	Dec	Year
Record high °C (°F)	15 (59)	17 (63)	22 (72)	33.9 (93.0)	38.3 (100.9)	41.1 (106.0)	41.7 (107.1)	40 (104)	37.2 (99.0)	33.9 (93.0)	24 (75)	20 (68)	41.7 (107.1)
Mean daily maximum °C (°F)	−7.2 (19.0)	−4.2 (24.4)	2.7 (36.9)	12 (54)	18.7 (65.7)	23.4 (74.1)	25.8 (78.4)	25.4 (77.7)	19 (66)	12.4 (54.3)	1.3 (34.3)	−5 (23)	10.4 (50.7)
Daily mean °C (°F)	−12.6 (9.3)	−9.6 (14.7)	−2.9 (26.8)	5.4 (41.7)	11.7 (53.1)	16.4 (61.5)	18.6 (65.5)	18 (64)	12 (54)	5.7 (42.3)	−4 (25)	−10.4 (13.3)	4 (39)
Mean daily minimum °C (°F)	−18 (0)	−14.9 (5.2)	−8.4 (16.9)	−1.3 (29.7)	4.8 (40.6)	9.3 (48.7)	11.3 (52.3)	10.6 (51.1)	4.9 (40.8)	−0.9 (30.4)	−9.4 (15.1)	−15.9 (3.4)	−2.3 (27.9)
Record low °C (°F)	−44.4 (−47.9)	−47.2 (−53.0)	−37.8 (−36.0)	−29.4 (−20.9)	−12.8 (9.0)	−4 (25)	0.6 (33.1)	−2 (28)	−12.2 (10.0)	−25.6 (−14.1)	−36 (−33)	−47 (−53)	−47.2 (−53.0)
Average precipitation mm (inches)	13.4 (0.53)	10.7 (0.42)	16.5 (0.65)	20.1 (0.79)	49.3 (1.94)	70.8 (2.79)	56.7 (2.23)	42.4 (1.67)	27.7 (1.09)	15 (0.6)	11 (0.4)	12.4 (0.49)	345.9 (13.62)
Source: Environment Canada

== Demographics ==
Population history (1981–2016)
Year	Pop.	±%
1981	202	—
1986	179	−11.4%
1991	156	−12.8%
1996	135	−13.5%
2001	150	+11.1%
2006	119	−20.7%
2011	120	+0.8%
2016	130	+8.3%
Source: Statistics Canada via Saskatchewan Bureau of Statistics

In the 2021 Census of Population conducted by Statistics Canada, Pennant had a population of 120 living in 55 of its 65 total private dwellings, a change of −7.7% from its 2016 population of 130. With a land area of 0.65 km^{2} (0.25 sq mi), it had a population density of 184.6/km^{2} (478.2/sq mi) in 2021.

In the 2016 Census of Population, the Village of Pennant recorded a population of 130 living in 62 of its 68 total private dwellings, a 7.7% change from its 2011 population of 120. With a land area of 0.65 km^{2} (0.25 sq mi), it had a population density of 200.0/km^{2} (518.0/sq mi) in 2016.

== See also ==
- List of communities in Saskatchewan
- List of villages in Saskatchewan
