= Leader, Saskatchewan =

Town in Saskatchewan, Canada

Leader
- Town
- Town of Leader
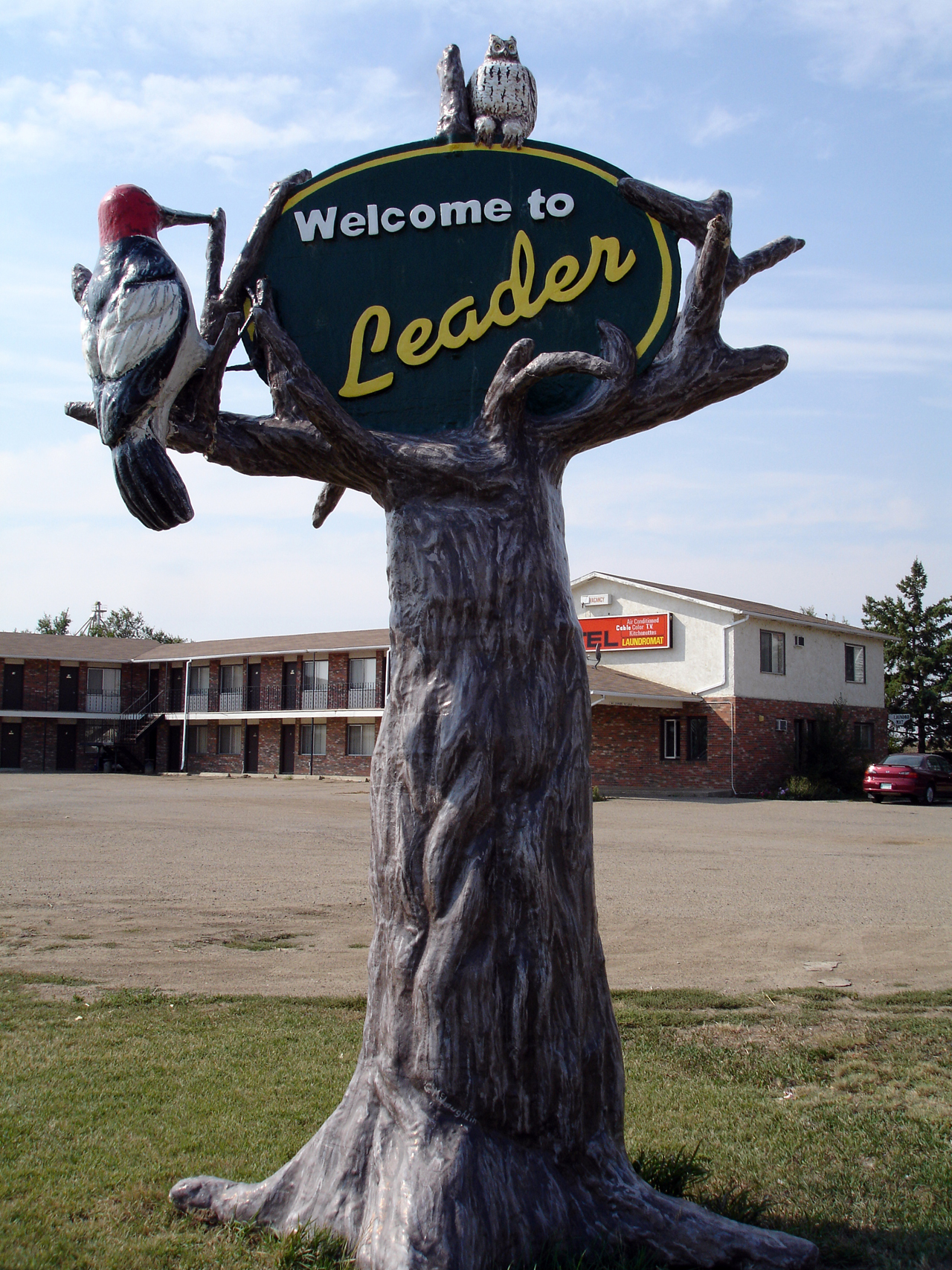
- Leader welcome sign

- Location within Happyland No. 231 Location within Saskatchewan
- Coordinates: 50°53′24″N 109°32′25″W
- Country: Canada
- Province: Saskatchewan
- Rural municipality: Happyland No. 231
- Settled: 1907
- Incorporated (village): 1913 (as Prussia)
- Incorporated (town): 1917 (as Leader)

Government
  - Mayor: Aaron Wenzel (2020, 2024)
  - Town Administrator: Erin Romanuik
  - MLA: Doug Steele
  - MP: Jeremy Patzer

Area
  - Total: 1.70 km^{2} (0.66 sq mi)

Population (2021)
  - Total: 881
  - Density: 525.1/km^{2} (1,360/sq mi)
- Time zone: UTC−06:00 (CST)
- Postal code: S0N 1H0
- Area code: 306
- Waterways: South Saskatchewan River
- Website: www.leader.ca

Leader is a town in southwestern Saskatchewan, Canada, located approximately 350 kilometres (220 mi) directly east of Calgary, Alberta and is near the border between Saskatchewan and Alberta. It has a population of 881 as of 2021.

== History ==
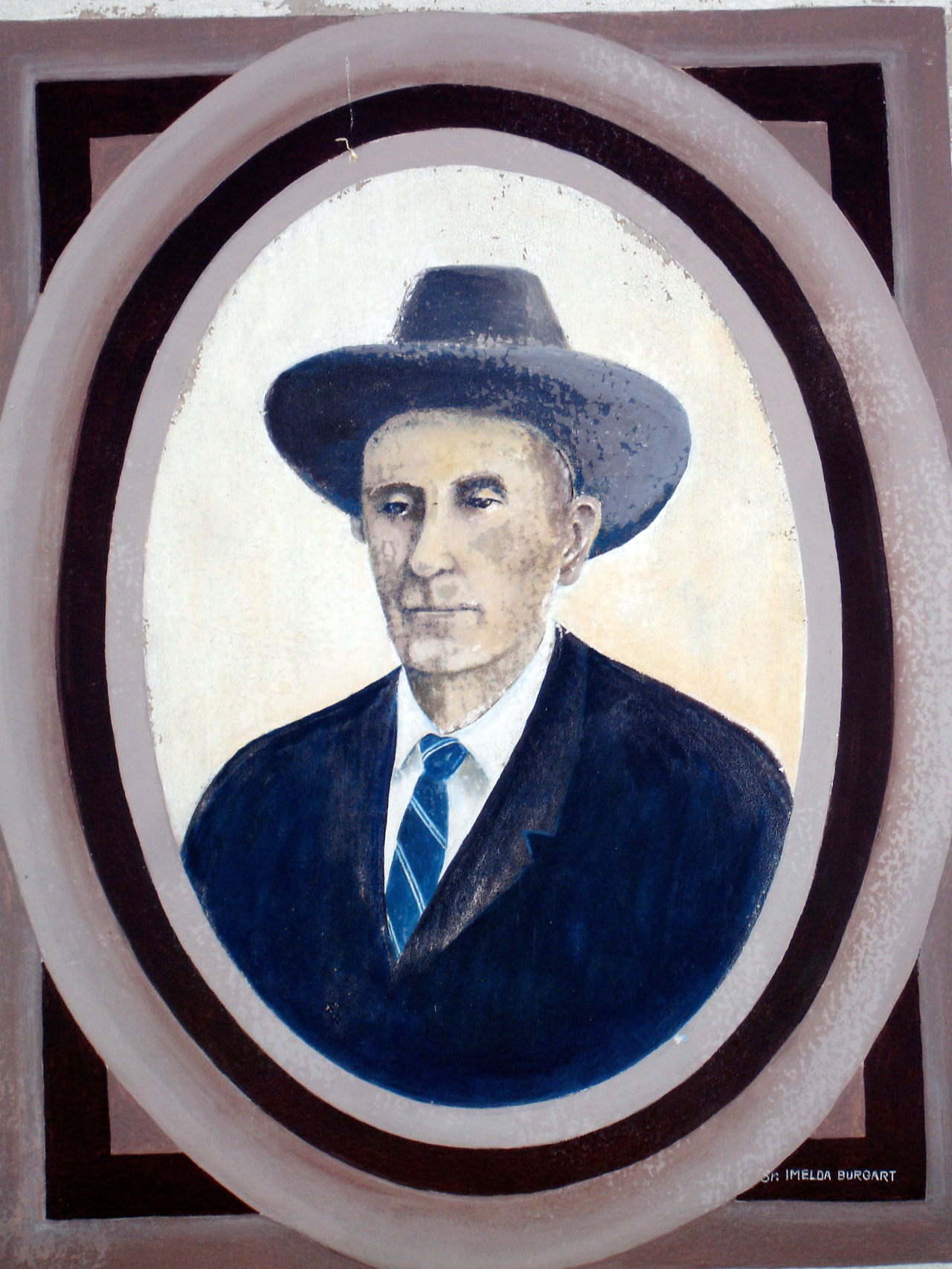
William Theodore Smith (1845–1918), builder of the Smith Barn

Before settlement, the Leader area was a hunting ground of prehistoric humans. A Midland Folsom point was discovered that the University of Saskatchewan dated back 8,000 to 9,000 years before present.

Leader lies in the traditional territory of the Nekaneet First Nation, who were signatories to Treaty 4.

Homesteaders began arriving in large numbers in 1907; most were German immigrants from Prussia or southern Russia. A Royal Canadian Mounted Police (RCMP) detachment opened in 1909, and ensured all settlers had adequate supplies to last the winter. By 1911, the Canadian Pacific Railway purchased a quarter section of land as the prospective site for a settlement. The railway arrived in 1913 and the village of Prussia was incorporated in September of that year. Hans Quittenbaum, owner of the general store, was named the first Reeve (or Mayor) of Prussia.

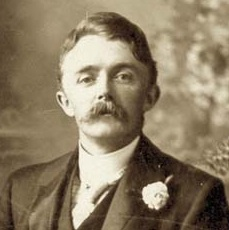
Hans Quittenbaum, storekeeper, was elected the first Reeve (i.e., Mayor) of Prussia, Saskatchewan, in 1913

By 1917, anti-German sentiment surrounding the events of World War I prompted the community to change its name, as well as replacing its German street names with numbers. The new name was chosen after a contest won by two local girls, Bertha Keller and Muriel Legault. They were inspired by the arrival of the Regina Morning Leader newspaper on the passenger train. The village name was officially changed to Leader on September 27, 1917; soon after, it incorporated as a town on November 1.

W.T. Smith, a local rancher, had the distinction of building North America's largest barn. The Smith Barn was completed in 1914, having taken 100 men five months to complete its construction; the building measured 400 ft × 128 ft × 60 ft (122 m × 39 m × 18 m). Smith died in 1918, and his massive barn was dismantled down to the concrete foundation in 1921. The concrete foundation remains there to this day.

Following World War II the town's population grew, reaching a peak of 1,236 in 1966. Since then the town's population has decreased, following Saskatchewan's overall trend of rural flight.

In 1995, American aviator Steve Fossett landed near Leader after taking off from South Korea, becoming the first person to make a solo flight across the Pacific Ocean in a balloon.

In November 2006, the inhabitants of Leader posed nude for a calendar in act of protest against the deteriorating condition of Highway 32, the main link to the city of Swift Current; it attracted the attention of media outlets in Canada and the United States. In the 2008-2009 provincial budget, the Ministry of Highways committed to rebuild Highway 32 between the villages of Shackleton and Prelate. The project was completed in November 2010 at a cost of $44.4 million.

High winds and dry conditions sparked a wildfire on October 17, 2017 that forced the town's population to evacuate to the town of Kindersley. The fire was contained and residents returned the next day. No one was injured and no structures were damaged, however the local waste station & local farmers had experienced fire damage.

== Demographics ==
In the 2021 Census of Population conducted by Statistics Canada, Leader had a population of 881 living in 372 of its 426 total private dwellings, a change of 2.1% from its 2016 population of 863. With a land area of 1.68 km^{2} (0.65 sq mi), it had a population density of 524.4/km^{2} (1,358.2/sq mi) in 2021.

Canada census – Leader community profile

	2021	2016	2011
Population	881 (+2.1% from 2016)	863 (+5.1% from 2011)	821 (-6.8% from 2006)
Land area	1.68 km^{2} (0.65 sq mi)	1.71 km^{2} (0.66 sq mi)	1.71 km^{2} (0.66 sq mi)
Population density	525.1/km^{2} (1,360/sq mi)	505.8/km^{2} (1,310/sq mi)	481.2/km^{2} (1,246/sq mi)
Median age	41.2 (M: 42.8, F: 39.2)	44.0 (M: 43.2, F: 46.2)	49.2 (M: 48.2, F: 50.1)
Private dwellings	426 (total) 372 (occupied)	390 (total)	425 (total)
Median household income	$84,000

References: 2021 2016 2011

== Geography and climate ==
Leader is located in Saskatchewan's mixed grassland ecoregion. The southern landscape is dominated by flat plains, with rolling hills by the South Saskatchewan River located 10 km (6.2 mi) north of Leader. The Great Sand Hills, a 1,900 km^{2} (730 sq mi) region of arid plains and sand dunes, lies just southeast of Leader. The town is located at the junction of highways 21 and 32, and is approximately 30 km (19 mi) east of the border with Alberta.

Like much of southwestern Saskatchewan, Leader experiences a semi-arid climate (Köppen climate classification BSk). Winters are long, cold and dry, while summers are short but very warm. Average precipitation is 274 mm (10.8 in) of rain per year and 85 cm (33 in) of snow per annum. Mean temperatures in the area range from a January low of −19 °C (−2 °F) to a summer high in July of 26 °C (79 °F).

The highest temperature ever recorded in Leader was 41.1 °C (106 °F), which occurred on seven occasions; June 16, 1933, July 26, 1933, July 27, 1936, June 29, 1937, July 4, 1937, June 23, 1941, and August 5, 1961. The coldest temperature ever recorded was −47.8 °C (−54 °F) on February 16, 1936.

Climate data for Leader, 1981–2010 normals, extremes 1924–present
Month	Jan	Feb	Mar	Apr	May	Jun	Jul	Aug	Sep	Oct	Nov	Dec	Year
Record high °C (°F)	15.0 (59.0)	17.0 (62.6)	26.9 (80.4)	34.4 (93.9)	38.3 (100.9)	41.1 (106.0)	41.1 (106.0)	41.1 (106.0)	38.5 (101.3)	33.9 (93.0)	22.8 (73.0)	19.4 (66.9)	41.1 (106.0)
Mean daily maximum °C (°F)	−6.5 (20.3)	−3.3 (26.1)	4.1 (39.4)	13.2 (55.8)	19.3 (66.7)	23.9 (75.0)	26.3 (79.3)	26.3 (79.3)	19.3 (66.7)	12.3 (54.1)	0.4 (32.7)	−5.9 (21.4)	10.8 (51.4)
Daily mean °C (°F)	−11.8 (10.8)	−8.7 (16.3)	−1.6 (29.1)	6.0 (42.8)	12.1 (53.8)	16.7 (62.1)	18.8 (65.8)	18.5 (65.3)	12.1 (53.8)	5.5 (41.9)	−4.8 (23.4)	−11.1 (12.0)	4.3 (39.7)
Mean daily minimum °C (°F)	−17.0 (1.4)	−14.2 (6.4)	−7.2 (19.0)	−1.2 (29.8)	4.8 (40.6)	9.5 (49.1)	11.3 (52.3)	10.7 (51.3)	4.8 (40.6)	−1.2 (29.8)	−10.0 (14.0)	−16.2 (2.8)	−2.2 (28.0)
Record low °C (°F)	−46.7 (−52.1)	−47.8 (−54.0)	−38.9 (−38.0)	−31.7 (−25.1)	−12.5 (9.5)	−3.9 (25.0)	−1.7 (28.9)	−2.2 (28.0)	−11.7 (10.9)	−30.0 (−22.0)	−37.5 (−35.5)	−46.0 (−50.8)	−47.8 (−54.0)
Average precipitation mm (inches)	10.7 (0.42)	9.6 (0.38)	20.4 (0.80)	22.8 (0.90)	52.1 (2.05)	58.0 (2.28)	55.1 (2.17)	43.6 (1.72)	32.5 (1.28)	18.8 (0.74)	18.3 (0.72)	16.4 (0.65)	358.3 (14.11)
Average rainfall mm (inches)	0.0 (0.0)	0.3 (0.01)	4.8 (0.19)	17.2 (0.68)	50.3 (1.98)	58.0 (2.28)	55.1 (2.17)	43.6 (1.72)	30.3 (1.19)	11.3 (0.44)	2.1 (0.08)	0.8 (0.03)	273.8 (10.78)
Average snowfall cm (inches)	10.6 (4.2)	9.3 (3.7)	15.6 (6.1)	5.6 (2.2)	1.8 (0.7)	0.0 (0.0)	0.0 (0.0)	0.0 (0.0)	2.2 (0.9)	7.6 (3.0)	16.2 (6.4)	15.6 (6.1)	84.5 (33.3)
Source: Environment Canada, Extremes 1924–1969, Extremes 1996–present

== Economy ==
Including three rural municipalities, Leader, is the centre of a retail trading area. The economic base of the community centres around the grain and cattle industries. The major industries in Leader and surrounding area are agricultural services and manufacturing. Leader also has tourism trade from attractions such as the Leader Bird Watching Trail, Smith Barn site, and the Great Sand Hills.

== Attractions ==
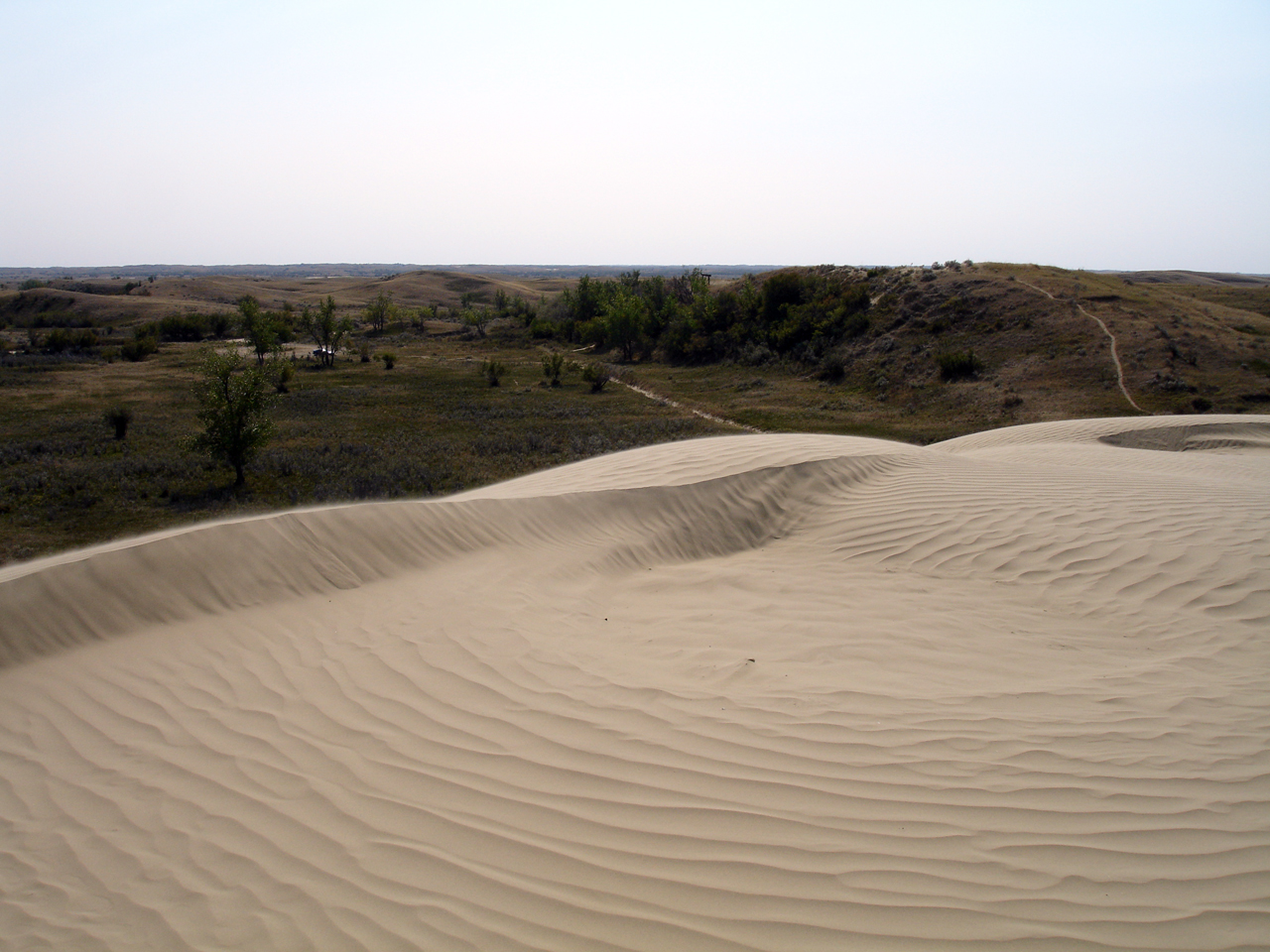
Great Sand Hills

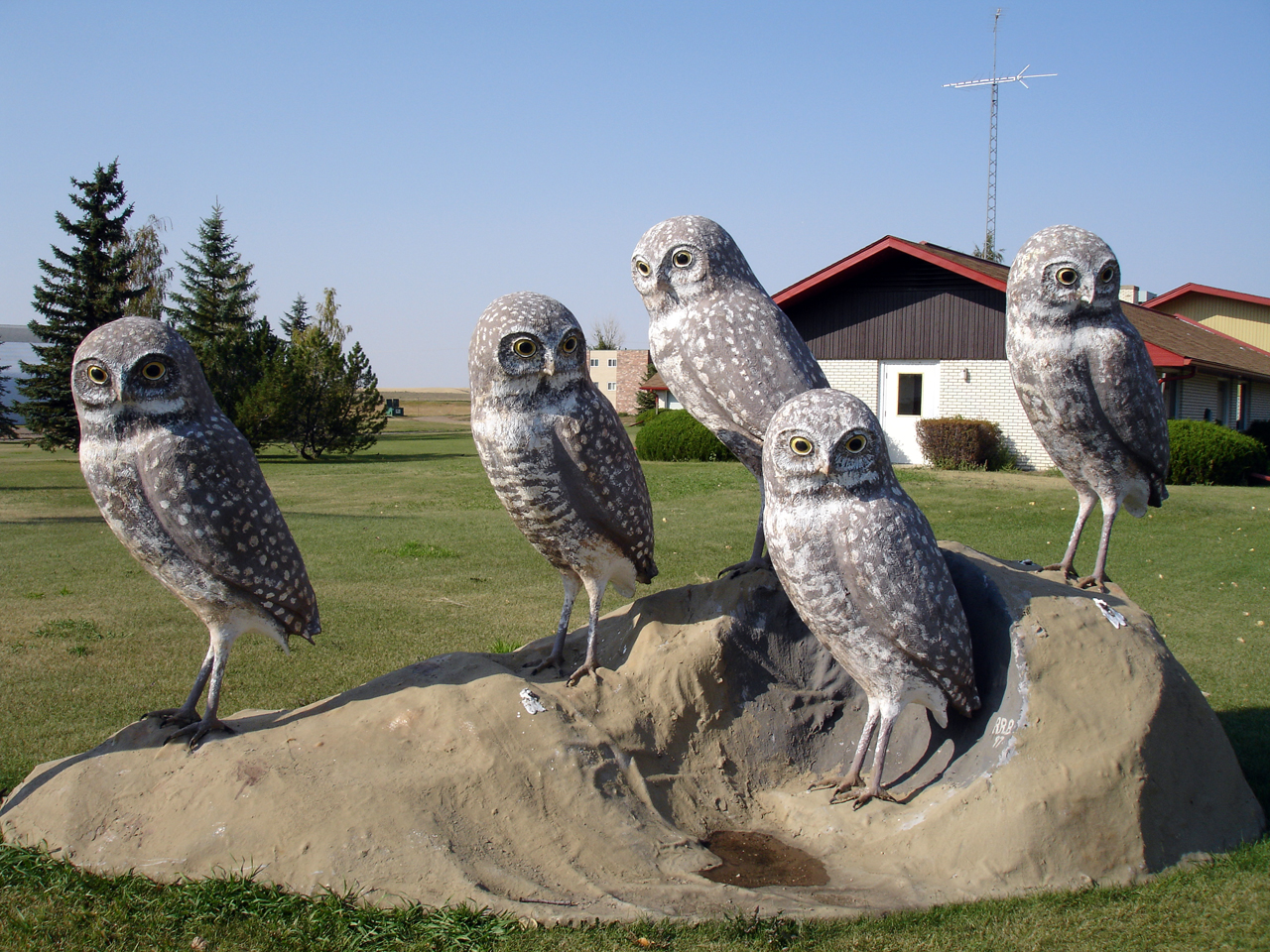
Burrowing Owls

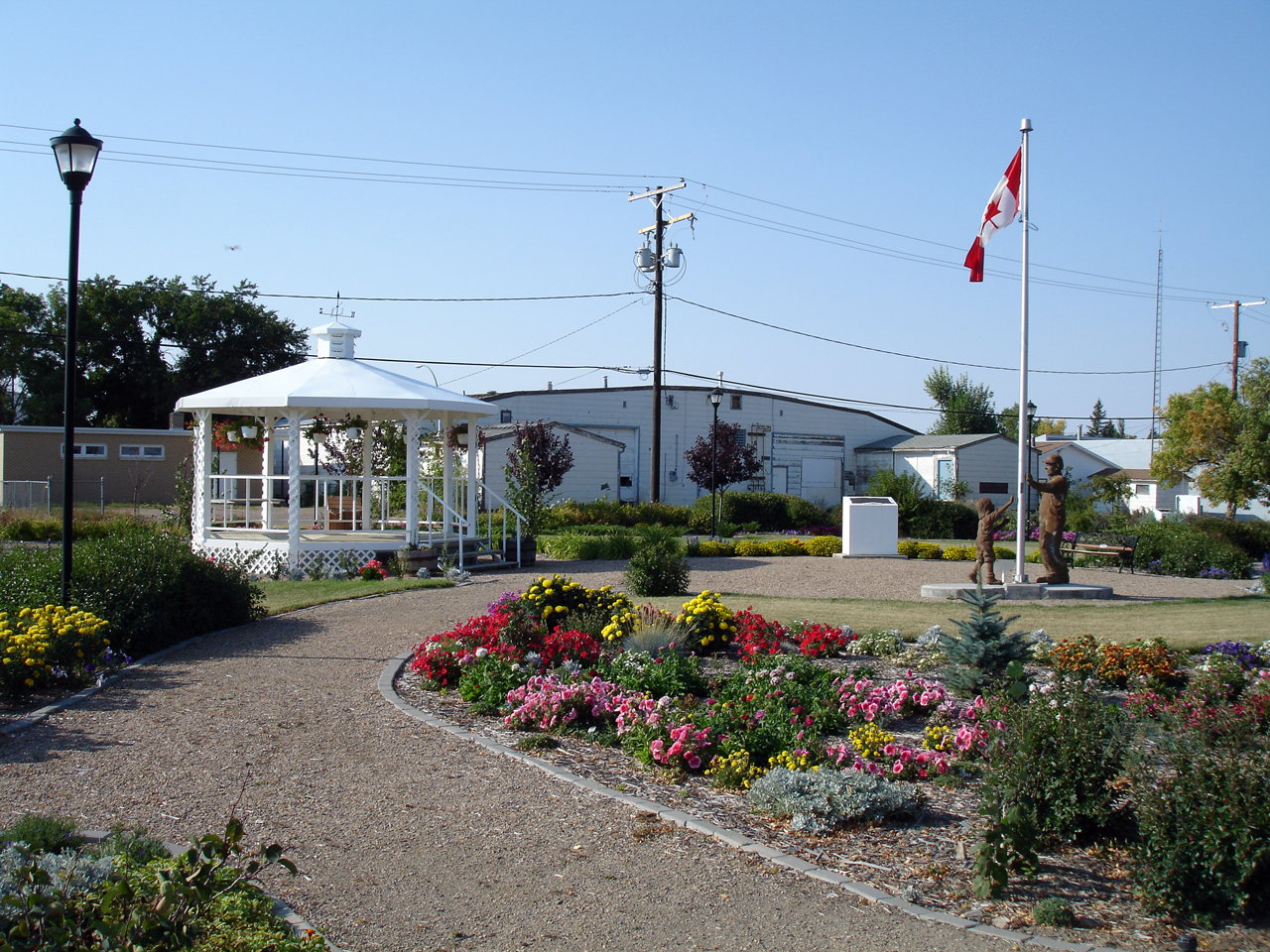
Millennium Gardens

Leader is the largest community in close proximity to the Great Sand Hills, a vast area of grassland and sand dunes in southern Saskatchewan. The Great Sand Hills are home to an abundance of wildlife, including sharp-tailed grouse, pronghorn, white pelican, merlin, peregrine falcon, coyote, white-tailed deer, golden eagle, badger, weasel, burrowing owl, mourning dove, porcupine, sandhill crane, and fox. It is the only known Saskatchewan habitat of the rare Ord's kangaroo rat. Several large sculptures of local wildlife are found at various locations around the town of Leader.

The South Saskatchewan River valley, just north of Leader, is the largest tract of riparian woodlands between the Cypress Hills and the northern forests. The Leader Bird Watching Trail is suited for viewing many native bird species, including pileated woodpecker, golden eagle, lark sparrow, yellow-breasted chat, red-headed woodpecker, yellow-green swallow, great blue heron, prairie falcon, ferruginous hawk, long-billed curlew, short-eared owl, loggerhead shrike, and burrowing owl. It is also home to the prairie rattlesnake and one of few known localities of rattlesnakes in Saskatchewan. Checkboard Hill, 6.4 km west of Leader on Highway 741, has a wide view of the river and surrounding landscape.

The Smith Barn Site is a provincial heritage site, located approximately ten kilometres northwest of Leader on private property. Its concrete foundation is the only part of the building that remains. A scale model of the barn is located at the Leader tourist information booth.

The Hutterites Colony in Estuary was established in 1958. The colony members have preserved the traditional Hutterite production methods, culture, language, and religion. Guided tours of the colony are available to visitors.

=== Parks and recreation ===
- River Ridge Golf Course – 18 hole golf course with club house and pro shop
- Leader Swimming Pool – seasonal outdoor heated pool, built in the 1960s and upgraded in the 1990s. Replaced in 2011.
- Leader Millennium Gardens – designed by a student of the University of Guelph School of Landscape Architecture, and built in 2000 in recognition of Leader's history and cultural heritage
- Leader Lions Park – green space with playground structure
- Leader Ball Park – baseball facility with four ball diamonds, grandstands, a concession, beer gardens, and serviced camp sites for visiting teams
- Leader Arena – indoor artificial ice surface for hockey and ice skating
- Leader Community Hall – community hall built in 1983; hosts social events such as weddings and dances
- Leader Friendship Centre – social gathering place for senior citizens

== Sports ==
Local sports teams include the Leader Expos (baseball) and the Leader Flyers (hockey). Other sports organizations include the Leader Minor Ball Club, Leader Minor Hockey Club and the Leader Skating Club.

== Government ==
Leader's local government consists of a town council, composed of an elected mayor and six councillors. The current mayor is Craig Tondevold.

In provincial politics, Leader is in the constituency of Cypress Hills. It is currently represented by Doug Steele of the Saskatchewan Party.

Federally, Leader is in the constituency of Cypress Hills—Grasslands, currently represented by Jeremy Patzer of the Conservative Party of Canada.

== Infrastructure ==
=== Transportation ===
Leader is located at the junction of Highways 21 and 32. The former Canadian Pacific Railway line also runs through the town; it is currently operated by the Great Sandhills Railway Leader has an airport with an asphalt runway.

=== Utilities ===
Electricity is provided by SaskPower and natural gas is provided by SaskEnergy. The town maintains its own water supply system, including a pump house and filtration plant. Telephone and internet service is provided by SaskTel.

=== Health care ===
- Leader and District Integrated Health Care Facility

=== Public safety ===
- Cypress Health Region emergency medical services
- Leader & District Fire Department
- RCMP Leader Detachment

== Education ==
- Leader Composite School – teaches students from kindergarten through grade 12
- Great Plains College – offers courses by satellite
- St. Angela's Academy (closed) – independent Catholic residential school for girls in the neighbouring community of Prelate. Closed on June 30, 2007 after 88 years of operation.

== Notable people ==
- Jesse Zubot, violinist

== See also ==
- List of communities in Saskatchewan
- List of towns in Saskatchewan
