= Saskatchewan Highway 321 =

Provincial highway in Saskatchewan, Canada

Highway 321

Route information
- Maintained by Ministry of Highways and Infrastructure
- Length: 33.0 km (20.5 mi)

Major junctions
- West end: Highway 545 at Alberta border near Burstall
- East end: Highway 21 at Liebenthal

Location
- Country: Canada
- Province: Saskatchewan
- Rural municipalities: Deer Forks, Happyland
- Towns: Burstall

Highway system
- Provincial highways in Saskatchewan
← Highway 320	→ Highway 322

Highway 321 is a provincial highway in the Canadian province of Saskatchewan. It runs from Highway 21 at Liebenthal to the Alberta border, where it becomes Highway 545. The highway also connects with Highway 635 and passes through the town of Burstall. It is about 33 kilometres (21 mi) long.

== Route description ==
Highway 321 begins in the Rural Municipality of Deer Forks No. 232 at the Alberta border; the roadway continues westward as Alberta Highway 545. It heads east to pass through the town of Burstall, where it crosses a railway as it travels along the town's northern boundary, before an intersection with Highway 635 and entering the Rural Municipality of Happyland No. 231. The highway crosses rural prairie lands for several kilometres before coming to an end at an intersection with Highway 21. The entire length of Highway 321 is a paved, two-lane highway.

== Major intersections ==
Rural municipality	Location	km	mi	Destinations	Notes
Deer Forks No. 232		0.0	0.0	Highway 545 west to Highway 41 (Buffalo Trail) – Medicine Hat, Empress	Continuation into Alberta; western terminus
Deer Forks No. 232	Burstall	7.0	4.3	Railway Avenue / Maharg Avenue	
Deer Forks No. 232		15.2	9.4	Highway 635 – Estuary, Richmound, Estuary Ferry	
Happyland No. 231	Liebenthal	33.0	20.5	Highway 21 – Leader, Maple Creek	Eastern terminus; road continues east as Township Road 200
1.000 mi = 1.609 km; 1.000 km = 0.621 mi
