= Bigstick Lake =

Lake in Saskatchewan, Canada

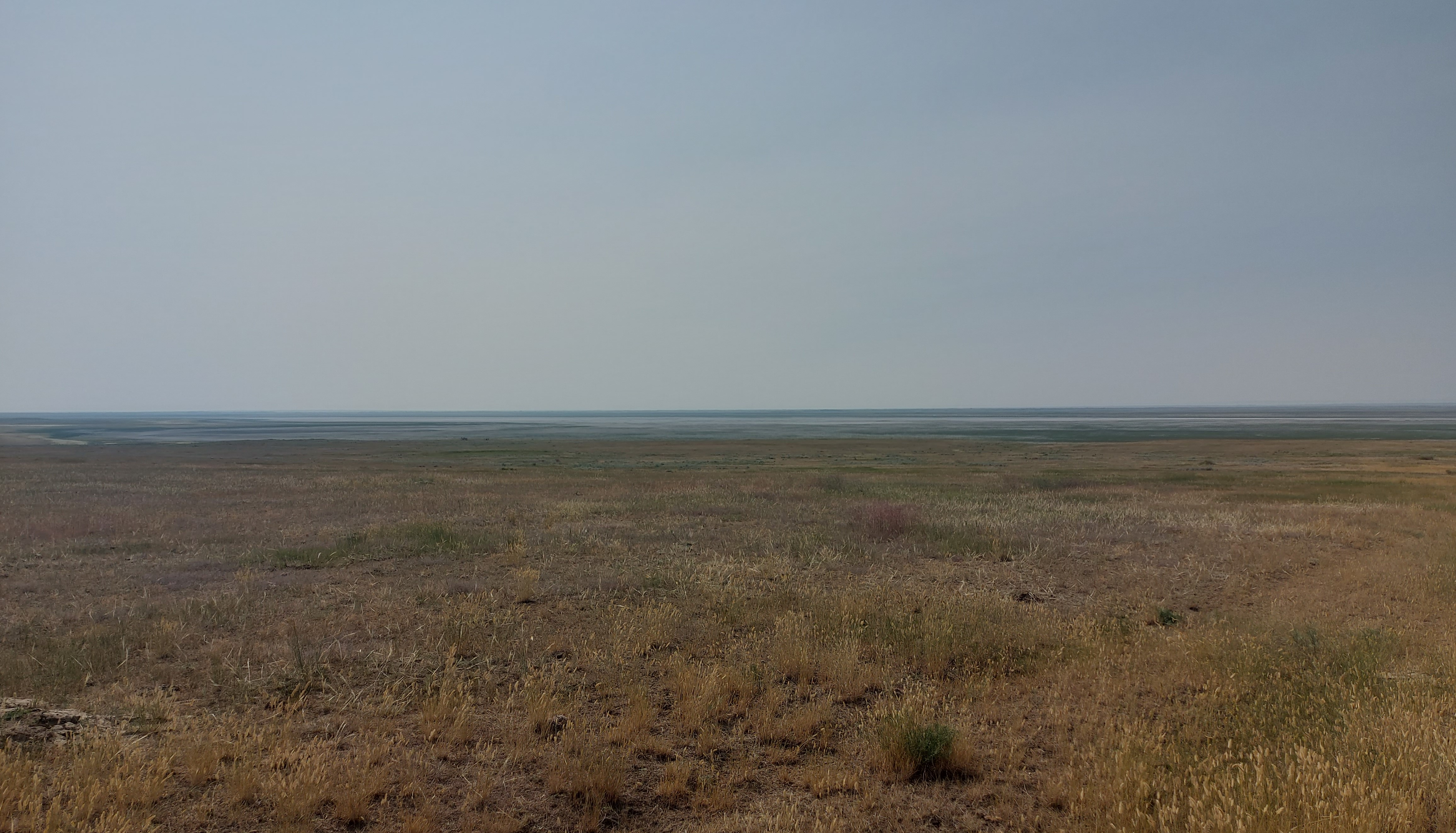
- Bigstick Lake

- Location in Saskatchewan Bigstick Lake (Canada)
- Location: Saskatchewan
- Coordinates: 50.2667°N 109.3439°W
- Type: Endorheic lake
- Part of: Saskatchewan River drainage basin
- Primary inflows: Maple Creek
- River sources: Cypress Hills
- Primary outflows: None
- Catchment area: 7,600 km^{2} (2,900 sq mi)
- Basin countries: Canada
- Surface area: 4,300 ha (11,000 acres)
- Surface elevation: 706 m (2,316 ft)
- Settlements: None

Bigstick Lake is a shallow endorheic alkali lake in the south-west region of the Canadian province of Saskatchewan. The lake was named after the Big Stick Trail that ran between the town of Maple Creek and the South Saskatchewan River. The trail was notable for a large, solitary tree along its route. The lake and its drainage basin are in a semi-arid region known as Palliser's Triangle.

The western half of Bigstick Lake is in the RM of Big Stick No. 141, while the eastern half is in the RM of Piapot No. 110. There are no communities nor recreational facilities along the lake's shore. Access is from Highway 728. A Big Stick Lake post office operated near the lake at SE-27-14-26-W3 from 1911 to 1925.

== Description ==
Bigstick Lake is south-west of the Great Sandhills and north of the Cypress Hills. The drainage basin for Bigstick Lake is endorheic, covering an area of about 7,600 km^{2} (2,900 sq mi) between the South Saskatchewan River drainage basin to the west, north, and east and the Milk River and its tributaries to the south. The primary inflow for the lake is Maple Creek, which begins at an elevation of over 1,200 metres (3,900 ft) in the Cypress Hills.

Bigstick Lake and part of its watershed are within two Important Bird Areas (IBA) of Canada – Maple Creek Grasslands (SK 041) and Bigstick Lake Plain (SK 042) – that total 1,520 km^{2} (590 sq mi) of protected bird habitat. In 1925, Bigstick Lake and nearby Crane Lake were designated as bird sanctuaries but were discontinued as such in 1948. In 1974, Ducks Unlimited Canada built a restriction dam at the western end of the lake. The dam created a marsh that covers an area of about 100 to 200 hectares.

== Bigstick Lake Plain IBA ==
Bigstick Lake Plain (SK 042) is an Important Bird Area (IBA) of Canada that covers an area of 783.52 km^{2} (302.52 sq mi). The IBA is a large pill-shaped protected area that encompasses three large salt lakes, Bigstick (4,300 ha (11,000 acres)), Crane (2,500 ha (6,200 acres)), and Ingebrigt (390 ha (960 acres)). Mason Lake is a reservoir that forms the western section of Ingebrigt Lake. Its water is less salty and the levels are more stable than that of Ingebrigt Lake. The Bigstick Lake Plain IBA stretches from the Trans-Canada Highway near Piapot in the south to Highway 21 just south of Fox Valley in the north.

Birds found at the site include the Franklin's gull, ferruginous hawk, piping plover, burrowing owl, Wilson's phalarope, eared grebe, black-crowned night heron, California gull, ring-billed gull, and the lark bunting. The area is also home to the pronghorn antelope.

Most of the land within the IBA is either community pasture or operated by the Prairie Farm Rehabilitation Administration (PFRA). Ducks Unlimited Canada operates at two sites in the IBA. One is the dam at Bigstick Lake and the other is north-west of Ingebrigt Lake.

== See also ==
- List of lakes of Saskatchewan
- List of protected areas of Saskatchewan
