= Saskatchewan Highway 371 =

Provincial highway in Saskatchewan, Canada

Highway 371

Route information
- Maintained by Ministry of Highways and Infrastructure
- Length: 41.4 km (25.7 mi)

Major junctions
- West end: Highway 537 at Alberta border near Horsham
- East end: Highway 21 near Fox Valley

Location
- Country: Canada
- Province: Saskatchewan
- Rural municipalities: Enterprise, Fox Valley

Highway system
- Provincial highways in Saskatchewan
← Highway 369	→ Highway 373

Highway 371 is a provincial highway in the Canadian province of Saskatchewan. It runs from the Alberta border, where it continues as Alberta Highway 537, to Highway 21 near Fox Valley. It is about 41 kilometres (25 mi) long.

== Route description ==
Hwy 371 begins in the Rural Municipality of Enterprise No. 142 as a continuation of Alberta Highway 537, which is a short connector to Alberta Highway 41 (Buffalo Trail), at the Alberta border. It heads due east through rural farmland for a few kilometres to the hamlet of Horsham, where it makes a sudden left turn to the north to become concurrent (overlapped) with northbound Hwy 635, with McLaren Lake Regional Park being accessed via southbound Hwy 635. After a couple kilometres, the pair curve eastward to travel through the centre of the village of Richmound, where Hwy 635 splits off and heads north, while Hwy 371 continues east to cross a former railway line and enter the Rural Municipality of Fox Valley No. 171. Continuing east, Hwy 371 travels just to the south of the locality of Linacre (access via Linacre Road (Range Road 3272)) as it travels through rural farmland for several kilometres, passing immediately to the south of the village of Fox Valley (accessed via Range Road 3262) before coming to an end at an intersection with Hwy 21, with the road continuing east as Township Road 174. The entire length of Hwy 371 is a paved, two-lane highway.

== Major intersections ==
From west to east:

Rural municipality	Location	km	mi	Destinations	Notes
Enterprise No. 142		0.0	0.0	Alberta border Continues as Highway 537 west to Highway 41	
Enterprise No. 142	Horsham	8.6	5.3	Horsham Access Road	
Enterprise No. 142	Horsham	9.1	5.7	Highway 635 south – Golden Prairie, McLaren Lake Regional Park	South end of Hwy 635 concurrency
Enterprise No. 142	Richmound	20.3	12.6	Highway 635 north – Burstall	North end of Hwy 635 concurrency
Fox Valley No. 171		30.0	18.6	Linacre Road (Range Road 3272) – Linacre	
Fox Valley No. 171	Fox Valley	39.8	24.7	Range Road 3262 – Fox Valley	
Fox Valley No. 171	Fox Valley	41.4	25.7	Highway 21 – Leader, Maple Creek	Eastern terminus; road continues east as Township Road 174
1.000 mi = 1.609 km; 1.000 km = 0.621 mi: Concurrency terminus

== See also ==
- Transportation in Saskatchewan
- Roads in Saskatchewan
