= Simpson, Saskatchewan =

Village in Saskatchewan, Canada

Simpson
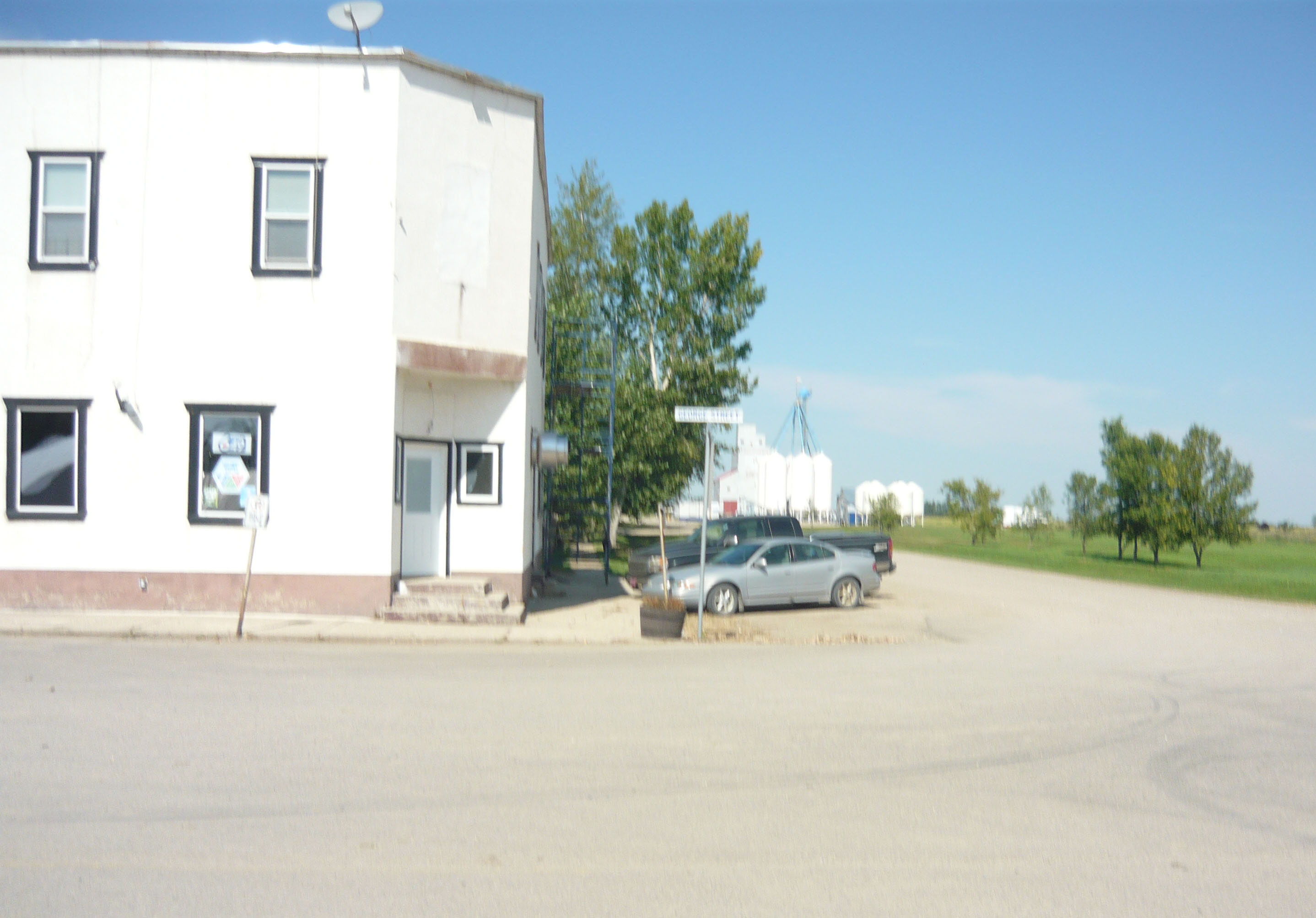
- Railway Avenue

- Location within Saskatchewan
- Coordinates: 51°27′N 105°27′W
- Country: Canada
- Province: Saskatchewan
- Rural Municipalities (R.M.): RM of Wood Creek No. 281
- Post office Founded: 1911-04-01

Area
  - Total: 1.41 km^{2} (0.54 sq mi)

Population (2016)
  - Total: 127
  - Density: 89.8/km^{2} (233/sq mi)
- Time zone: UTC-6 (CST)
- Website: Simpson

Simpson (2016 population: 127) is a village in the Canadian province of Saskatchewan within the Rural Municipality of Wood Creek No. 281 and Census Division No. 11. It is between the cities of Regina and Saskatoon on Highway 2. The administrative office for the Rural Municipality of Wood Creek No. 281 is located in the village. The post office was founded in 1911 by Herman Bergren and Joseph Newman during construction of the Canadian Pacific Railway. It is named after George Simpson, a governor of the Hudson's Bay Company.

== History ==
The early 1904 pioneer homestead settlers were George, John and Robert Simpson, Bill Grieve, William Cole, and E.C. Howie. Simpson incorporated as a village on July 11, 1911.

== Geography ==
- Last Mountain Lake Sanctuary, North America's oldest sanctuary for birds, is a nearby tourist attraction. Last Mountain Lake National Wildlife Area, Last Mountain Lake Wildlife Management Unit, and Last Mountain Regional Park are all conservation areas near Simpson on Long Lake or Last Mountain Lake.
- Manitou Beach, located on a salt water lake - the land of healing waters - and the historic Danceland dance hall are located near Simpson at Watrous. This is also a major tourist attraction for the area.

== Sites of interest ==
The previous Wood Creek No. 281 Rural Municipality Office was designated on April 5, 1982, as a municipal heritage site and now houses the Simpson district museum.

== Demographics ==
Population history (1981–2021)
Year	Pop.	±%
1981	231	—
1986	224	−3.0%
1991	212	−5.4%
1996	208	−1.9%
2001	194	−6.7%
2006	118	−39.2%
2011	131	+11.0%
2016	127	−3.1%
2021	131	+3.1%
Source: Statistics Canada via Saskatchewan Bureau of Statistics

In the 2021 Census of Population conducted by Statistics Canada, Simpson had a population of 131 living in 64 of its 83 total private dwellings, a change of 3.1% from its 2016 population of 127. With a land area of 1.57 km^{2} (0.61 sq mi), it had a population density of 83.4/km^{2} (216.1/sq mi) in 2021.

In the 2016 Census of Population, the Village of Simpson recorded a population of 127 living in 66 of its 87 total private dwellings, a −3.1% change from its 2011 population of 131. With a land area of 1.41 km^{2} (0.54 sq mi), it had a population density of 90.1/km^{2} (233.3/sq mi) in 2016.

== See also ==
- List of communities in Saskatchewan
- List of rural municipalities in Saskatchewan
- Simpson Flyers
