= Maple Creek (Saskatchewan) =

River in Saskatchewan, Canada

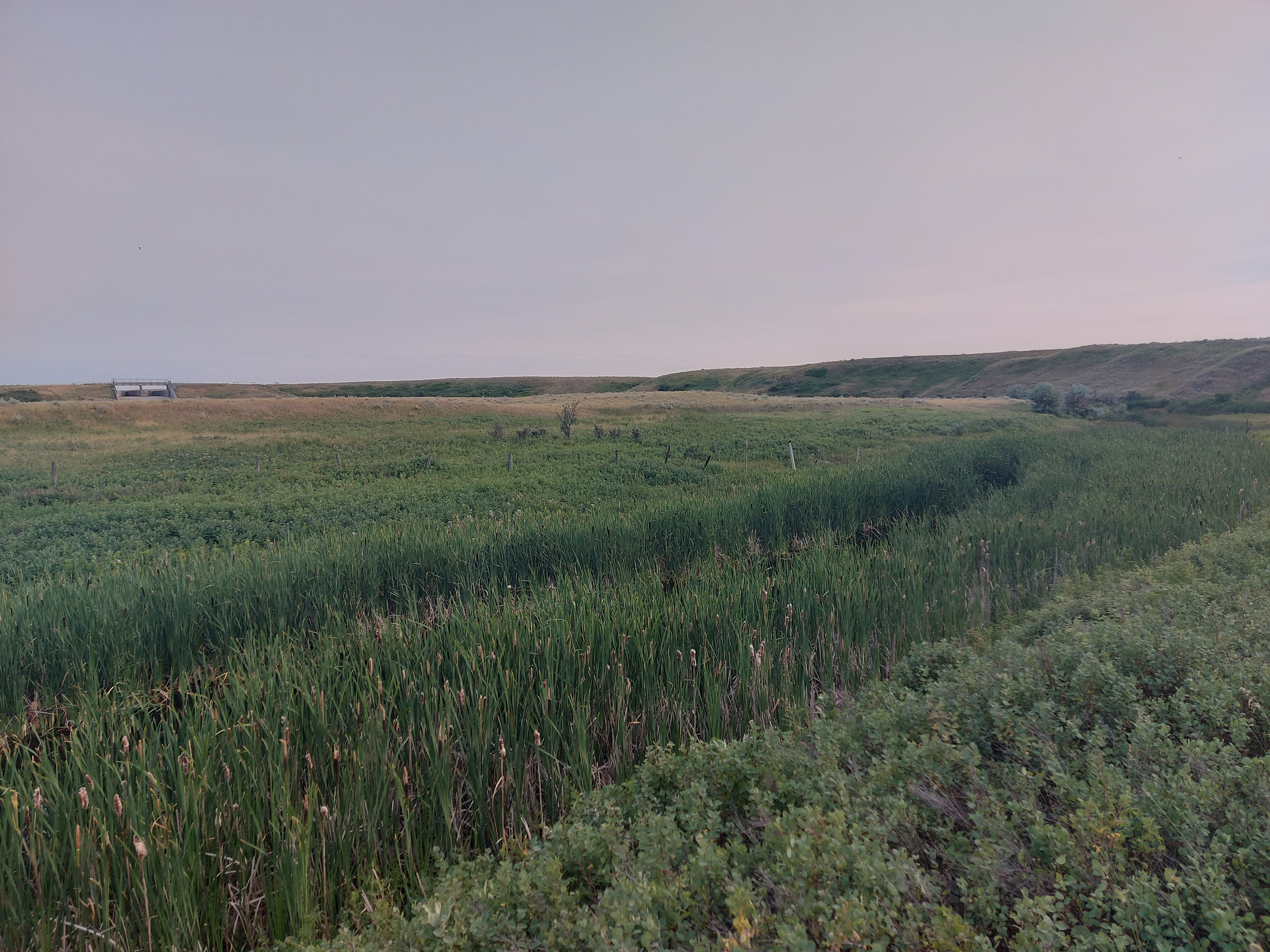
- Maple Creek

- Location of the mouth in Saskatchewan Maple Creek (Saskatchewan) (Canada)

Location
- Country: Canada
- Provinces: Saskatchewan

Physical characteristics
- Source: Cypress Hills
  - location: RM of Maple Creek No. 111
  - coordinates: 49.7265°N 109.3405°W
  - elevation: 1,221 m (4,006 ft)
- Mouth: Bigstick Lake
  - location: RM of Big Stick No. 141
  - coordinates: 50.2409°N 109.3996°W
  - elevation: 702 m (2,303 ft)

Basin features
- River system: Bigstick Lake endorheic basin
- Tributaries
  - left: Flemming Creek, Gap Creek

Maple Creek is a river in the south-west region of the Canadian province of Saskatchewan. The river is in the semi-arid region known as Palliser's Triangle. It begins in the Cypress Hills and flows generally in a northward direction and empties into the endorheic Bigstick Lake. The town of Maple Creek is the only notable community along the course of the river. Due to the generally dry and drought-prone conditions of the area, reservoirs were built along the river's course and in its watershed to ensure a stable water supply for irrigation. Two Important Bird Areas (IBA) of Canada cover much of the lower watershed of the river.

== Description ==
Maple Creek begins at an elevation of over 1,200 metres (3,900 ft) in the Cypress Hills in the RM of Maple Creek No. 111. The Cypress Hills are part of the Missouri Coteau, which is a large upland region along the continental divide. Most of the lower watershed of the river is protected by the Maple Creek Grasslands and Bigstick Lake Plain IBAs.

From the Cypress Hills, Maple Creek flows northward through valleys and coulees where it is joined by several creeks before opening up onto the plains. The town of Maple Creek is along the course of the river and is located near the base of the Cypress Hills. Just north of the town, Maple Creek is joined by its longest tributary, Gap Creek. From there, Maple Creek flows into Junction Reservoir. Maple Creek continues northward from the reservoir where it crosses the Trans-Canada Highway. From the Trans-Canada Highway, it continues northward where it is joined by several small creeks, such as one that flows in from Bitter Lake, en route to Bigstick Lake. At the western end of Bigstick Lake, a restriction dam was built in 1974 by Ducks Unlimited Canada that created a marsh that covers an area of about 100 to 200 hectares.

Highway 21 parallels the river from near its source in the Cypress Hills to its mouth at Bigstick Lake. An historic trail called Big Stick Trail ran between the town of Maple Creek and the South Saskatchewan River following Maple Creek for much of the route. The trail was notable for a large, solitary tree along the route.

=== Tributaries ===
Several tributaries flow into Maple Creek. From upper to lower watershed, the notable ones include:

- Flemming Creek
- Gap Creek
  - Shaw Creek
  - Cypress Creek
  - Downie Creek
  - McShane Creek
  - McCoy Creek

== Reservoirs ==
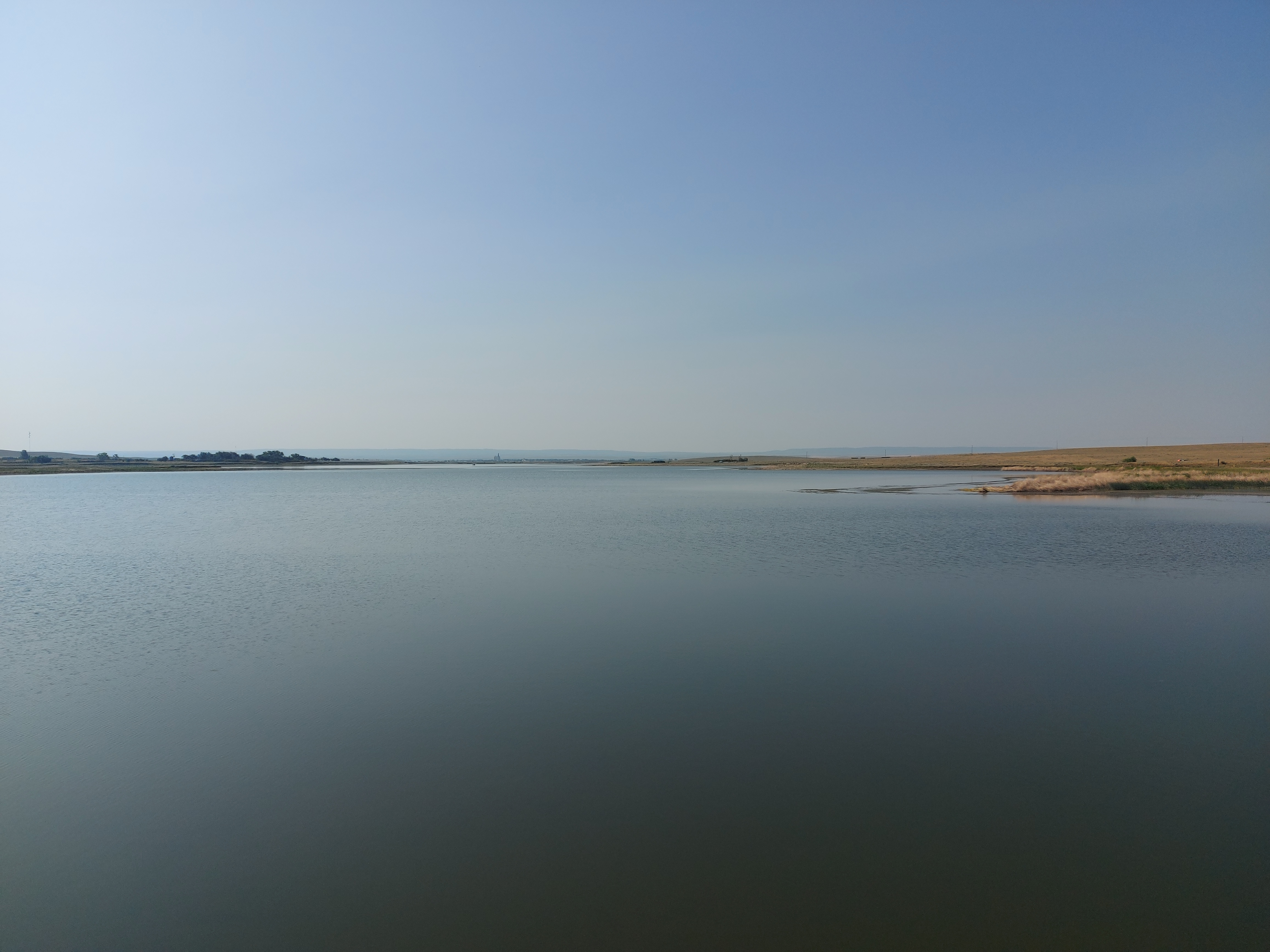
Junction Reservoir

There are four reservoirs in Maple Creek's watershed that are owned and operated by the Agri-Environmental Service Branch. The reservoirs retain water to be released for irrigation. In order from largest to smallest, they include:

- Junction Reservoir (49.9611°N 109.5127°W) is 3 km (1.9 mi) downstream from the town of Maple Creek along the course of Maple Creek. The dam is 8 km (5.0 mi) south of town. The reservoir has a surface area of 494.2 ha (1,221 acres), is 11 m (36 ft) deep, and has a volume of 12,933 dam^{3} (456,700,000 cu ft).
- Downie Lake (49.7986°N 109.6817°W) is near Downie Creek in the Gap Creek basin. Water is diverted into the lake from both Downie and Gap Creeks and then released as needed back into Downie Creek. The lake has a 25 km^{2} (9.7 sq mi) drainage basin, is 260 ha (640 acres) in size, and has a volume of 12,223 dam^{3} (431,700,000 cu ft).
- Harris Reservoir (49.8136°N 109.5028°W) is beside Flemming Creek and water is supplied to the lake via a channel from Flemming Creek. Two channels flow out of the lake – one west to Gap Creek and one east to Flemming Creek. Harris Reservoir has a 14 km^{2} (5.4 sq mi) drainage basin, is 9.5 m (31 ft) deep, has a 131 ha (320 acres) surface area, and has a volume of 6,047 dam^{3} (213,500,000 cu ft).
- McDougald Reservoir (49.8224°N 109.4451°W) is located beside Maple Creek, south of the town of Maple Creek in the hills, and is supplied by a diversion channel. Water is released back into Maple Creek as needed. It has a drainage basin of 2 km^{2} (0.77 sq mi), is 4 m (13 ft) deep, has a surface area of 21 ha (52 acres), and a volume of 931 dam^{3} (32,900,000 cu ft).

== Maple Creek Grasslands IBA ==
Maple Creek Grasslands (SK 041) is an Important Bird Area (IBA) of Canada along the course of Maple Creek that covers an area of 736.56 km^{2} (284.39 sq mi). The IBA covers an area that includes the town of Maple Creek, Junction Reservoir, and the salt lakes of Bitter and Hay. The sandy soils in the area limit agricultural activity resulting in cattle grazing being prominent. A large portion of the site is covered by the Bigstick Lake Prairie Farm Rehabilitation Administration.

Birds found at the site include the ferruginous hawk, burrowing owl, great blue heron, and the long-billed curlew.

== Fish species ==
The northern pike is a fish commonly found in Maple Creek.

== See also ==
- List of rivers of Saskatchewan
- List of protected areas of Saskatchewan
- Maple Creek crater
