= Liebenthal =

Liebenthal may refer to:

== People ==
- Walter Liebenthal, Sinologist (1886-1982)

== Towns ==
- Liebenthal, Kansas
- Liebenthal bei Hirschberg, the former German name for Lubomierz, a town in Lwówek County, Lower Silesian Voivodeship, in southwestern Poland
- Liebenthal, Saskatchewan

== Villages ==
- Pionerskoye (Sovetsky District) (Liebental), Sovetsky District, Russia
- Libňatov (Liebenthal), Trutnov District, Czech Republic
- Liptaň (Liebenthal), Bruntál District, Czech Republic
- Dolni Dobrouc (Liebenthal), Ústí nad Orlicí District, Czech Republic
