= Glen McPherson =

Glen McPherson may refer to:

- Rural Municipality of Glen McPherson No. 46, a rural municipality in Saskatchewan, Canada
- Glen McPherson, a member of the Saskatchewan Legislative Assembly (1991–2000)
