= Rural Municipality of Deer Forks No. 232 =

Rural municipality in Saskatchewan, Canada

Deer Forks No. 232
- Rural municipality
- Rural Municipality of Deer Forks No. 232

- Location of the RM of Deer Forks No. 232 in Saskatchewan
- Coordinates: 50.847°N 109.888°W
- Country: Canada
- Province: Saskatchewan
- Census division: 8
- SARM division: 3
- Formed: January 1, 1913

Government
  - Reeve: Doug Smith
  - Governing body: RM of Deer Forks No. 232 Council
  - Administrator: Kim Lacelle
  - Office location: Burstall

Area (2016)
  - Land: 736.26 km^{2} (284.27 sq mi)

Population (2016)
  - Total: 109
  - Density: 0.1/km^{2} (0.26/sq mi)
- Time zone: CST
  - Summer (DST): CST
- Postal code: S0N 0H0
- Area codes: 306 and 639
- Highway(s): Highway 21; Highway 32; Highway 321; Highway 371; Highway 635; Highway 741
- Waterway(s): South Saskatchewan River
- Website: Official website

The Rural Municipality of Deer Forks No. 232 (2016 population: 109) is a rural municipality (RM) in the Canadian province of Saskatchewan within Census Division No. 8 and SARM Division No. 3. Located in the southwest portion of the province, it is adjacent to the Alberta boundary, neighbouring Cypress County to the west.

== History ==
The RM of Deer Forks No. 232 incorporated as a rural municipality on January 1, 1913.

== Geography ==
=== Communities and localities ===
The following urban municipalities are surrounded by the RM.

Towns

- Burstall

The following unincorporated communities are within the RM.

Localities

- Estuary
- Gascoigne

== Demographics ==
Population history (1981–2016)
Year	Pop.	±%
1981	286	—
1986	266	−7.0%
1991	258	−3.0%
1996	242	−6.2%
2001	226	−6.6%
2006	213	−5.8%
2011	223	+4.7%
2016	109	−51.1%
Source: Statistics Canada via Saskatchewan Bureau of Statistics

In the 2021 Census of Population conducted by Statistics Canada, the RM of Deer Forks No. 232 had a population of 208 living in 46 of its 57 total private dwellings, a change of −0.5% from its 2016 population of 209. With a land area of 736.87 km^{2} (284.51 sq mi), it had a population density of 0.3/km^{2} (0.7/sq mi) in 2021.

In the 2016 Census of Population, the RM of Deer Forks No. 232 recorded a population of 109 living in 45 of its 56 total private dwellings, a −51.1% change from its 2011 population of 223. With a land area of 736.26 km^{2} (284.27 sq mi), it had a population density of 0.1/km^{2} (0.4/sq mi) in 2016.

== Government ==
The RM of Deer Forks No. 232 is governed by an elected municipal council and an appointed administrator that meets on the second Wednesday of every month. The reeve of the RM is Doug Smith and its administrator is Kim Lacelle. The RM's office is located in Burstall.

== See also ==
- List of rural municipalities in Saskatchewan
