= Estuary, Saskatchewan =

Ghost town in Saskatchewan, Canada

Estuary
- Unincorporated hamlet
- Location of Estuary in Saskatchewan Estuary (Canada)
- Coordinates: 50.933°N 109.900°W
- Country: Canada
- Province: Saskatchewan
- Region: Southwest
- Census division: 15
- Rural municipality: Deer Forks No. 232
- Established: April 19, 1914
- Incorporated (village): between 1914 and 1917
- Restructured (hamlet): 1930

Government
  - Reeve: Doug Smith
  - Administrator: Tim C. Lozinsky
  - Governing body: Deer Forks No. 232

Population (2006)
  - Total: 1
- Postal code: N/A
- Area code: 306
- Highways: Highway 635
- Waterways: South Saskatchewan River

Estuary is a hamlet in RM of Deer Forks No. 232 in the Canadian province of Saskatchewan. Very little remains of the former village of 800, other than a private residence and a pioneer cemetery on a small hill known as Cemetery Hill, overlooking the South Saskatchewan River.

== History ==
Federal census population history
Year	Pop.	±%
1916	196	—
1921	216	+10.2%
1926	98	−54.6%
Source: Statistics Canada

The development of a townsite was registered on April 19, 1914 along the future site of the Canadian Pacific Railway branch line between Leader, Saskatchewan and Empress, Alberta. With the railway came a flood of settlers to the area, most of whom were Germans. By the time World War I began the growth of the new community of Estuary swelled from a few pioneers to 800 citizens.

From 1914 to 1954 Estuary had some 163 businesses, including its own power plant, a weekly newspaper, a theater, six blacksmith shops, 10 livery barns, six rooming houses, six hardware stores, 10 cafes/restaurants, 13 service stations, 23 grocery stores including a department store, and seven grain elevators.

=== The decline ===
Throughout Estuary's short history there have been many mysterious fires, two of which were devastating to the town. One in 1917 destroyed 18 properties and another in 1928. Several other minor fires which were just as mysterious were set. Because of Estuary's serious decline after the end of World War I it was believed that the fires were deliberately set in order to collect insurance.

In 1919 the town was hit hardest when the Canadian Pacific Railway decided to go ahead with plans to build a branch line from Leader to the new town of Burstall, causing a reduction of grain coming into town. Feeling betrayed by the railway company many residents picked up and left never to come back, taking everything with them including their homes and businesses.

The 1930s brought another blow to the once prosperous village, starting with the restructuring of the community's village status to a hamlet in 1930. By 1951 the fuel dealership shut its doors, soon after in 1966 the community's last store was closed. The railway station was bought and moved away in 1970. The last remaining businesses, the three remaining grain elevators, were closed and demolished in 1982.

== See also ==
- List of communities in Saskatchewan
- List of hamlets in Saskatchewan
- Lists of ghost towns in Canada
- List of ghost towns in Saskatchewan
- Estuary Ferry
