= Horsham, Saskatchewan =

Horsham
- Hamlet
- Location within Saskatchewan Location within Canada
- Coordinates: 50°25′0″N 109°53′3″W
- Country: Canada
- Province: Saskatchewan
- Census division: 8
- Rural Municipality: Enterprise No. 142
- Time zone: CST
- Area code: 306
- Highways: Highway 371 / Highway 635

Horsham is a hamlet in Rural Municipality of Enterprise No. 142, Saskatchewan, Canada. The hamlet is located on Highway 371 about 214 km (133 mi) northwest of Swift Current and 9 km (6 mi) east of the Alberta border, at its intersection with Highway 635.

== See also ==
- List of communities in Saskatchewan
