= Piapot, Saskatchewan =

Piapot
- Hamlet
- Location of Piapot in Saskatchewan Piapot (Canada)
- Coordinates: 49.989°N 109.121°W
- Country: Canada
- Province: Saskatchewan
- Census division: 4
- Rural Municipality: Piapot
- Post office Founded: N/A
- Unincorporated: N/A
- Previously Incorporated (Town): 1908

Government
  - Mayor: N/A
  - Town Manager: N/A
  - Governing body: Rural Municipality of Piapot

Area
  - Total: 0.74 km^{2} (0.29 sq mi)

Population (2016)
  - Total: 50
  - Density: 67.9/km^{2} (176/sq mi)
- Time zone: CST
- Postal code: S0N 1Y0
- Area code: 306
- Highways: Highway 614; Highway 1
- Railways: Canadian Pacific Kansas City

Piapot (/ˈpaɪəpɒt/) is a hamlet within the Rural Municipality of Piapot No. 110, Saskatchewan, Canada. Listed as a designated place by Statistics Canada, the hamlet had a population of 50 in the Canada 2016 Census.

Piapot originated in the 1880s, as a siding on the Canadian Pacific Railway which still exist to the present day. Once a thriving community, it has seen a steady decline since the 1950s and in the present day it resembles a ghost town. The hotel and saloon closed in 2006 but reopened in May 2008, embracing western heritage and culture. The only other business that is open to the public is the post office.

== Demographics ==
In the 2021 Census of Population conducted by Statistics Canada, Piapot had a population of 40 living in 22 of its 29 total private dwellings, a change of −20% from its 2016 population of 50. With a land area of 0.74 km^{2} (0.29 sq mi), it had a population density of 54.1/km^{2} (140.0/sq mi) in 2021.

Canada census – Piapot, Saskatchewan community profile

	2016	2011
Population	50 (- 9.1% from 2011)	55 (+ 22.2% from 2006)
Land area	0.74 km^{2} (0.29 sq mi)	0.74 km^{2} (0.29 sq mi)
Population density	67.9/km^{2} (176/sq mi)	74.7/km^{2} (193/sq mi)
Median age	51.0 (M: 56.0, F: 46.5)	47.5 (M: 50.2, F: 44.0)
Private dwellings	37 (total)	33 (total)
Median household income	$NA

References: 2016 2011

== See also ==
- List of communities in Saskatchewan
- List of hamlets in Saskatchewan
- List of place names in Canada of Indigenous origin
- Piapot
