= Richmound =

Village in Saskatchewan, Canada

- Village
- Location within Saskatchewan Location within Canada
- Coordinates: 50.446°N 109.763°W
- Country: Canada
- Province: Saskatchewan
- Region: Saskatchewan
- Census division: 8
- Rural municipality: Enterprise
- Post office Founded: 1912-08-15

Government
  - Mayor: Brad Miller
  - Administrator: Brenda Ottenbreit
  - Governing body: Richmound Village Council

Area
  - Total: 0.47 km^{2} (0.18 sq mi)

Population (2021)
  - Total: 118
  - Density: 327.8/km^{2} (849/sq mi)
- Time zone: CST
- Postal code: S0N 2E0
- Area code: 306
- Highways: Highway 371 / Highway 635
- Website: Official website

Richmound (2021 population: 118) is a village in the Canadian province of Saskatchewan within the Rural Municipality of Enterprise No. 142 and Census Division No. 8. It is approximately 80 kilometres (50 mi) northeast of Medicine Hat, Alberta. The economy is driven in large part by the oil and gas sector as well as agriculture.

The village has a community hall, church, skating arena, ball diamonds, a credit union and a general store. Students are bussed to a neighbouring village.

== History ==
From 1908 to 1914, the area was settled by Germans, mostly Catholics from South Russia. The Richmound post office was established in 1912. St. Mary's Catholic church was founded northwest of Richmound in 1917, and moved to the community in 1928. Richmound incorporated as a village on May 5, 1947. In the 1980s, a natural gas discovery drove the creation of new businesses and housing. By the 2000s, oil and gas activity subsided leading to job losses and the closure of the K-12 school in 2008. In the following years the local grocery store and curling rink also closed.

In September 2023, the leader of a sovereign citizen group Romana Didulo and about 15 to 25 supporters took up residence in the former school. Didulo responded to demonstrations against her presence in Richmound by allegedly threatening local officials through emails and social media posts. At 5:51am on September 3, 2025, Didulo, along with others, were arrested as part of a raid by the RCMP on the Richmound School. The experience of the village with Didulo's group was part of an investigative series produced by CBC's Uncover podcast.

On July 4, 2026, a community greenhouse project located near the former school was launched, aiming to bring the community together and to increase access to locally grown food, with the nearest grocery store from Richmound being located in Leader, Saskatchewan.

== Demographics ==
Population history (1981–2021)
Year	Pop.	±%
1981	188	—
1986	199	+5.9%
1991	236	+18.6%
1996	203	−14.0%
2001	193	−4.9%
2006	159	−17.6%
2011	154	−3.1%
2016	147	−4.5%
2021	118	−19.7%
Source: Statistics Canada via Saskatchewan Bureau of Statistics

In the 2021 Census of Population conducted by Statistics Canada, Richmound had a population of 118 living in 55 of its 61 total private dwellings, a change of −19.7% from its 2016 population of 147. With a land area of 0.48 km^{2} (0.19 sq mi), it had a population density of 245.8/km^{2} (636.7/sq mi) in 2021.

In the 2016 Census of Population, the Village of Richmound recorded a population of 147 living in 66 of its 78 total private dwellings, a −4.8% change from its 2011 population of 154. With a land area of 0.47 km^{2} (0.18 sq mi), it had a population density of 312.8/km^{2} (810.1/sq mi) in 2016.

== See also ==
- List of communities in Saskatchewan
- List of francophone communities in Saskatchewan
- List of villages in Saskatchewan
