= Fox Valley, Saskatchewan =

Village in Saskatchewan, Canada

Fox Valley
- Village
- Village of Fox Valley
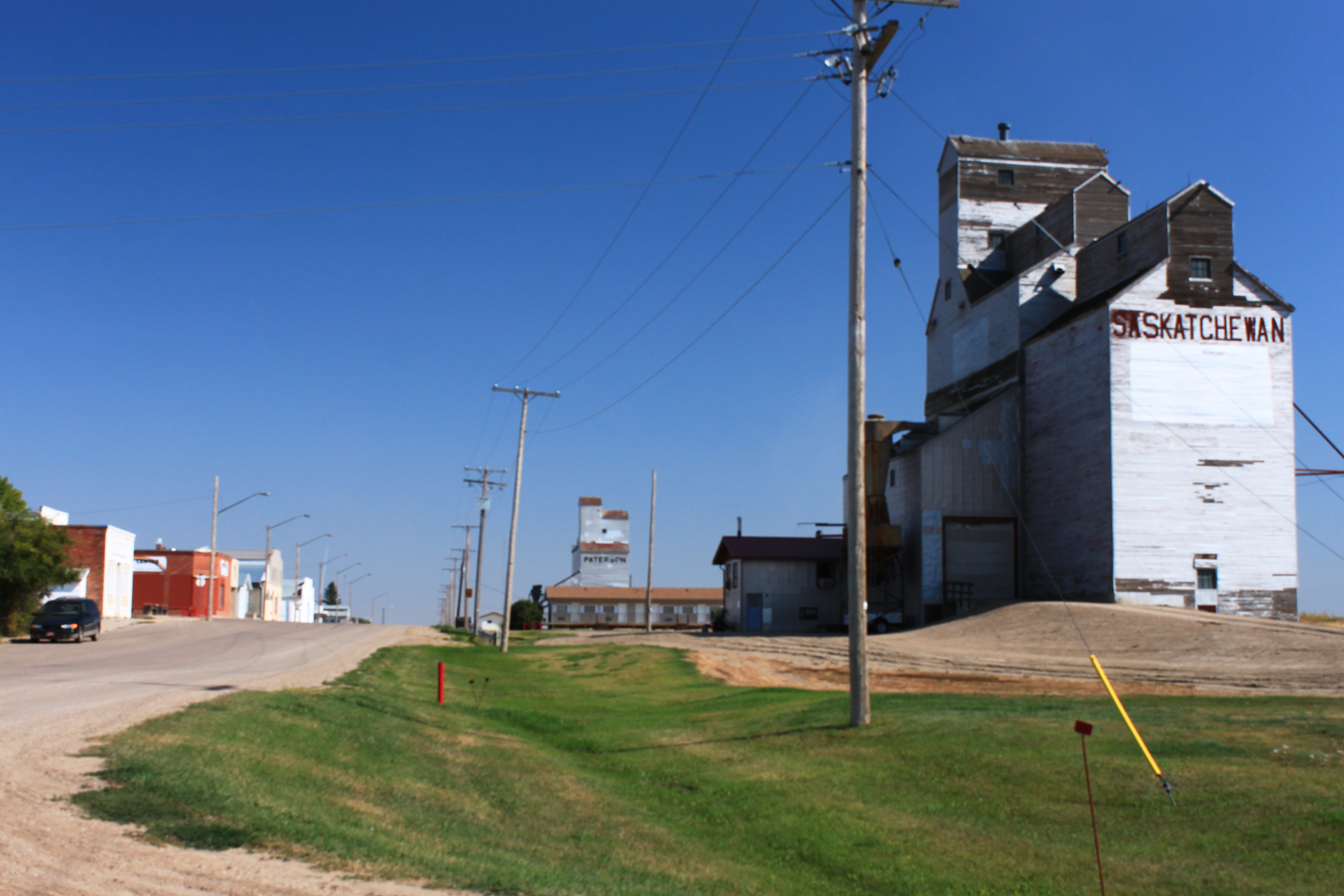
- Elevators and businesses along Railway Ave. Fox Valley.

- Location within Saskatchewan Location within Canada
- Coordinates: 50.28°N 109.29°W
- Country: Canada
- Province: Saskatchewan
- Region: Southwest
- Census division: 8
- Rural Municipality: Fox Valley

Government
  - Governing body: Fox Valley Village Council
  - Mayor: Sean Checkley
  - Administrator: Keri-Lynn Hudec

Area
  - Total: 0.60 km^{2} (0.23 sq mi)

Population (2016)
  - Total: 249
  - Density: 413.3/km^{2} (1,070/sq mi)
- Time zone: UTC-6 (CST)
- Postal code: S0N 0V0
- Area code: 306
- Highways: Highway 21 / Highway 371
- Railways: Canadian Pacific Railway (abandoned)

Fox Valley (2016 population: 249) is a village in the Canadian province of Saskatchewan within the Rural Municipality of Fox Valley No. 171 and Census Division No. 8. Fox Valley is located just off Highway 21, approximately 64 kilometres (40 mi) north of Maple Creek and 51 kilometres (32 mi) south of Leader in the southwest region of the province. The early settlers of the village and surrounding area included many Germans from Russia (mainly from the Beresan region near Odessa). The local economy is heavily dependent on agriculture and natural gas.

Fox Valley has a swimming pool, an arena, and a curling rink.

== History ==
Fox Valley incorporated as a village on August 30, 1928.

== Demographics ==
Population history (1981–2016)
| Year | Pop. | ±% |
|---|---|---|
| 1981 | 380 | — |
| 1986 | 394 | +3.7% |
| 1991 | 360 | −8.6% |
| 1996 | 359 | −0.3% |
| 2001 | 326 | −9.2% |
| 2006 | 295 | −9.5% |
| 2011 | 260 | −11.9% |
| 2016 | 249 | −4.2% |
Source: Statistics Canada via Saskatchewan Bureau of Statistics

In the 2021 Census of Population conducted by Statistics Canada, Fox Valley had a population of 259 living in 114 of its 134 total private dwellings, a change of 4% from its 2016 population of 249. With a land area of 0.7 km^{2} (0.27 sq mi), it had a population density of 370.0/km^{2} (958.3/sq mi) in 2021.

In the 2016 Census of Population, the Village of Fox Valley recorded a population of 249 living in 108 of its 133 total private dwellings, a −4.4% change from its 2011 population of 260. With a land area of 0.6 km^{2} (0.23 sq mi), it had a population density of 415.0/km^{2} (1,074.8/sq mi) in 2016.

== Education ==
Fox Valley is home to Fox Valley School (K-12), part of the Chinook School Division No. 211. The school's sports team is the Fox Valley Legends.

== See also ==
- List of communities in Saskatchewan
- List of villages in Saskatchewan
