= Rural Municipality of Wood Creek No. 281 =

Rural municipality in Saskatchewan, Canada

Wood Creek No. 281
- Rural municipality
- Rural Municipality of Wood Creek No. 281
- Location of the RM of Wood Creek No. 281 in Saskatchewan
- Coordinates: 51.500°N 105.586°W
- Country: Canada
- Province: Saskatchewan
- Census division: 11
- SARM division: 5
- Formed: December 13, 1909

Government
  - Reeve: Glen Busse
  - Governing body: RM of Wood Creek No. 281 Council
  - Administrator: Darlene Mann
  - Office location: Simpson

Area (2016)
  - Land: 832.34 km^{2} (321.37 sq mi)

Population (2016)
  - Total: 224
  - Density: 0.3/km^{2} (0.78/sq mi)
- Time zone: CST
  - Summer (DST): CST
- Area codes: 306 and 639

The Rural Municipality of Wood Creek No. 281 (2016 population: 224) is a rural municipality (RM) in the Canadian province of Saskatchewan within Census Division No. 11 and SARM Division No. 5. It is located in the south-central portion of the province.

== History ==
The RM of Wood Creek No. 281 incorporated as a rural municipality on December 13, 1909.

== Geography ==
The RM is adjacent to Last Mountain Lake.

=== Communities and localities ===
The following urban municipalities are surrounded by the RM.

Villages

- Simpson

The following unincorporated communities are within the RM.

Localities

- Amazon

== Demographics ==
Population history (1981–2016)
Year	Pop.	±%
1981	432	—
1986	408	−5.6%
1991	394	−3.4%
1996	351	−10.9%
2001	325	−7.4%
2006	274	−15.7%
2011	205	−25.2%
2016	224	+9.3%
Source: Statistics Canada via Saskatchewan Bureau of Statistics

In the 2021 Census of Population conducted by Statistics Canada, the RM of Wood Creek No. 281 had a population of 205 living in 91 of its 110 total private dwellings, a change of −8.5% from its 2016 population of 224. With a land area of 829.78 km^{2} (320.38 sq mi), it had a population density of 0.2/km^{2} (0.6/sq mi) in 2021.

In the 2016 Census of Population, the RM of Wood Creek No. 281 recorded a population of 224 living in 100 of its 117 total private dwellings, a 9.3% change from its 2011 population of 205. With a land area of 832.34 km^{2} (321.37 sq mi), it had a population density of 0.3/km^{2} (0.7/sq mi) in 2016.

== Government ==
The RM of Wood Creek No. 281 is governed by an elected municipal council and an appointed administrator that meets on the second Thursday of every month. The reeve of the RM is Glen Busse while its administrator is Darlene Mann. The RM's office is located in Simpson.
