= Rural Municipality of Greenfield No. 529 =

Former rural municipality in Saskatchewan, Canada

Coordinates: 53°40′00″N 109°00′03″W

The Rural Municipality of Greenfield No. 529 was a rural municipality (RM) in the Canadian province of Saskatchewan. It was originally formed as the RM of Bright Sand No. 529 before changing its name to the RM of Greenfield No. 529 on February 2, 1926. Greenfield No. 529 was dissolved on June 1, 1990. It was absorbed by the RM of Mervin No. 499.

== Demographics ==
Historical population
Year	Pop.	±%
1961	589	—
1966	548	−7.0%
1971	476	−13.1%
1976	378	−20.6%
1981	453	+19.8%
1986	436	−3.8%
