= Golden Prairie, Saskatchewan =

Village in Saskatchewan, Canada

Golden Prairie
- Village
- Village of Golden Prairie
- Location of Golden Prairie in Saskatchewan Golden Prairie (Canada)
- Coordinates: 50.22°N 109.631°W
- Country: Canada
- Province: Saskatchewan
- Region: Southwest
- Census division: 8
- Rural municipality: Big Stick No. 141
- Post office Founded: 1911
  - Village: 15 April 1942

Government
  - Type: Municipal
  - Governing body: Golden Prairie Village Council
  - Mayor: Forbes Van Dellen
  - Administrator: Melinda Hammer

Area
  - Total: 0.41 km^{2} (0.16 sq mi)

Population (2016)
  - Total: 30
  - Density: 72.5/km^{2} (188/sq mi)
- Time zone: UTC-6 (CST)
- Postal code: S0N 0Y0
- Area code: 306
- Highways: Highway 728
- Railways: Canadian Pacific Railway

Golden Prairie is a village in the Canadian province of Saskatchewan within the Rural Municipality of Big Stick No. 141 and Census Division No. 8.

== History ==
Golden Prairie incorporated as a village on 15 April 1942.

== Demographics ==
Population history (1981–2016)
Year	Pop.	±%
1981	83	—
1986	89	+7.2%
1991	67	−24.7%
1996	78	+16.4%
2001	56	−28.2%
2006	35	−37.5%
2011	35	+0.0%
2016	30	−14.3%
Source: Statistics Canada via Saskatchewan Bureau of Statistics

In the 2021 Census of Population conducted by Statistics Canada, Golden Prairie had a population of 30 living in 17 of its 21 total private dwellings, a change of 0% from its 2016 population of 30. With a land area of 0.48 km^{2} (0.19 sq mi), it had a population density of 62.5/km^{2} (161.9/sq mi) in 2021.

In the 2016 Census of Population, the Village of Golden Prairie recorded a population of 30 living in 19 of its 29 total private dwellings, a −16.7% change from its 2011 population of 35. With a land area of 0.41 km^{2} (0.16 sq mi), it had a population density of 73.2/km^{2} (189.5/sq mi) in 2016.

== Economy ==
The village has a grain elevator with a producer car loading facility, curling rink, and a restaurant. It holds the seat to the Rural Municipality of Big Stick No. 141 office.

== Climate ==
Golden Prairie experiences a semi-arid climate (Köppen climate classification BSk) with long, cold, dry winters and short but very warm summers. Precipitation is low, with an annual average of 341.5 mm (13.44 in), and is concentrated in the warmer months.

Climate data for Golden Prairie
Month	Jan	Feb	Mar	Apr	May	Jun	Jul	Aug	Sep	Oct	Nov	Dec	Year
Record high °C (°F)	14.0 (57.2)	21.5 (70.7)	24.0 (75.2)	31.5 (88.7)	35.0 (95.0)	39.5 (103.1)	38.5 (101.3)	39.0 (102.2)	36.0 (96.8)	32.0 (89.6)	25.0 (77.0)	16.5 (61.7)	39.5 (103.1)
Mean daily maximum °C (°F)	−6.2 (20.8)	−2.3 (27.9)	4.5 (40.1)	12.7 (54.9)	19.0 (66.2)	23.4 (74.1)	26.7 (80.1)	26.5 (79.7)	20.0 (68.0)	13.3 (55.9)	2.2 (36.0)	−3.9 (25.0)	11.3 (52.3)
Daily mean °C (°F)	−12.1 (10.2)	−8.3 (17.1)	−1.5 (29.3)	5.6 (42.1)	11.4 (52.5)	15.9 (60.6)	18.4 (65.1)	17.9 (64.2)	11.7 (53.1)	5.7 (42.3)	−3.9 (25.0)	−9.8 (14.4)	4.3 (39.7)
Mean daily minimum °C (°F)	−17.9 (−0.2)	−14.2 (6.4)	−7.6 (18.3)	−1.7 (28.9)	3.8 (38.8)	8.3 (46.9)	10.1 (50.2)	9.3 (48.7)	3.4 (38.1)	−2.0 (28.4)	−10.0 (14.0)	−15.8 (3.6)	−2.9 (26.8)
Record low °C (°F)	−44.0 (−47.2)	−42.0 (−43.6)	−36.5 (−33.7)	−29.4 (−20.9)	−7.2 (19.0)	−5.0 (23.0)	0.6 (33.1)	−3.0 (26.6)	−13.9 (7.0)	−29.0 (−20.2)	−36.0 (−32.8)	−45.0 (−49.0)	−45.0 (−49.0)
Average precipitation mm (inches)	18.9 (0.74)	11.3 (0.44)	20.4 (0.80)	23.9 (0.94)	43.9 (1.73)	64.6 (2.54)	42.8 (1.69)	34.4 (1.35)	30.8 (1.21)	19.0 (0.75)	14.0 (0.55)	17.5 (0.69)	341.5 (13.44)
Source: Environment Canada

== See also ==
- List of communities in Saskatchewan
- List of villages in Saskatchewan
