= Rural Municipality of Fox Valley No. 171 =

Rural municipality in Saskatchewan, Canada

Fox Valley No. 171 Keebleville No. 171 (1913–1926)
- Rural municipality
- Rural Municipality of Fox Valley No. 171

- Location of the RM of Fox Valley No. 171 in Saskatchewan
- Coordinates: 50.466°N 109.431°W
- Country: Canada
- Province: Saskatchewan
- Census division: 8
- SARM division: 3
- Formed: October 29, 1913
- Name change: November 27, 1926 (from RM of Keebleville No. 171)

Government
  - Reeve: Anthony Hoffart
  - Governing body: RM of Fox Valley No. 171 Council
  - Administrator: Stephanie MacPhail
  - Office location: Fox Valley

Area (2016)
  - Land: 1,253.79 km^{2} (484.09 sq mi)

Population (2016)
  - Total: 330
  - Density: 0.3/km^{2} (0.78/sq mi)
- Time zone: CST
  - Summer (DST): CST
- Area codes: 306 and 639

The Rural Municipality of Fox Valley No. 171 (2016 population: 330) is a rural municipality (RM) in the Canadian province of Saskatchewan within Census Division No. 8 and SARM Division No. 3.

== History ==
The RM of Keebleville No. 171 was originally incorporated as a rural municipality on October 29, 1913. Its name was changed to the RM of Fox Valley No. 171 on November 27, 1926.

== Geography ==
=== Communities and localities ===
The following urban municipalities are surrounded by the RM.

Villages

- Fox Valley, Saskatchewan

The following unincorporated communities are within the RM.

Localities

- Inglebright, Saskatchewan
- Linacre, Saskatchewan

== Demographics ==
Population history (1981–2016)
Year	Pop.	±%
1981	572	—
1986	503	−12.1%
1991	400	−20.5%
1996	387	−3.2%
2001	414	+7.0%
2006	368	−11.1%
2011	345	−6.2%
2016	330	−4.3%
Source: Statistics Canada via Saskatchewan Bureau of Statistics

In the 2021 Census of Population conducted by Statistics Canada, the RM of Fox Valley No. 171 had a population of 344 living in 76 of its 91 total private dwellings, a change of 4.2% from its 2016 population of 330. With a land area of 1,253.4 km^{2} (483.9 sq mi), it had a population density of 0.3/km^{2} (0.7/sq mi) in 2021.

In the 2016 Census of Population, the RM of Fox Valley No. 171 recorded a population of 330 living in 72 of its 85 total private dwellings, a −4.3% change from its 2011 population of 345. With a land area of 1,253.79 km^{2} (484.09 sq mi), it had a population density of 0.3/km^{2} (0.7/sq mi) in 2016.

== Government ==
The RM of Fox Valley No. 171 is governed by an elected municipal council and an appointed administrator that meets on the second Thursday of every month. The reeve of the RM is Anthony Hoffart while its administrator is Stephanie MacPhail. The RM's office is located in Fox Valley.

== Transportation ==
Roads

- Highway 21—serves Fox Valley, Saskatchewan
- Highway 371—intersects Highway 21

== See also ==
- List of rural municipalities in Saskatchewan
