= SARM Division No. 3 =

Division in Saskatchewan, Canada

SARM Division No. 3 is a division of the Saskatchewan Association of Rural Municipalities (SARM) within the Canadian province of Saskatchewan. It is located in the south west area of the province. There are 45 rural municipalities in this division. The current director for Division 3 is Darren Steinley.

== List of RMs in SARM Division No. 3 ==
By numerical RM No.

- RM No. 17 Val Marie
- RM No. 18 Lone Tree
- RM No. 19 Frontier
- RM No. 45 Mankota
- RM No. 46 Glen McPherson
- RM No. 49 White Valley
- RM No. 51 Reno
- RM No. 75 Pinto Creek
- RM No. 76 Auvergne
- RM No. 77 Wise Creek
- RM No. 78 Grassy Creek
- RM No. 79 Arlington
- RM No. 105 Glen Bain
- RM No. 106 Whiska Creek
- RM No. 107 Lac Pelletier
- RM No. 108 Bone Creek
- RM No. 109 Carmichael
- RM No. 110 Piapot
- RM No. 111 Maple Creek
- RM No. 135 Lawtonia
- RM No. 136 Coulee
- RM No. 137 Swift Current
- RM No. 138 Webb
- RM No. 139 Gull Lake
- RM No. 141 Big Stick
- RM No. 142 Enterprise
- RM No. 165 Morse
- RM No. 166 Excelsior
- RM No. 167 Saskatchewan Landing
- RM No. 168 Riverside
- RM No. 169 Pittville
- RM No. 171 Fox Valley
- RM No. 225 Canaan
- RM No. 226 Victory
- RM No. 228 Lacadena
- RM No. 229 Miry Creek
- RM No. 231 Happyland
- RM No. 230 Clinworth
- RM No. 232 Deer Forks
- RM No. 255 Coteau
- RM No. 256 King George
- RM No. 257 Monet
- RM No. 259 Snipe Lake
- RM No. 260 Newcombe

== See also ==
- List of regions of Saskatchewan
- List of census divisions of Saskatchewan
- List of communities in Saskatchewan
- Geography of Saskatchewan
