= Liebenthal, Saskatchewan =

Hamlet in Saskatchewan, Canada

Liebenthal
- Hamlet
- Interactive map of Liebenthal
- Coordinates: 50°39′35″N 109°32′12″W
- Country: Canada
- Province: Saskatchewan
- Rural municipality: Happyland No. 231
- Time zone: UTC-6 (CST)
- Highways: Highway 21 / Highway 321

Liebenthal is a hamlet in the Rural Municipality of Happyland No. 231, Saskatchewan. The community consists of the Sacred Heart Catholic Church and the Liebenthal community hall. It is considered as the southern (and alternative) gateway to the Great Sandhills Ecological Area. Liebenthal lies at the intersection of Highways 21 and 321.

== See also ==
- List of communities in Saskatchewan
