= Simpson Flyers =

The Simpson Flyers were a senior hockey team based in Simpson, Saskatchewan. The Simpson Flyers played in the Long Lake Hockey League until the 1997/1998 season when the team combined with the Imperial Sabres to form the Long Lake Lightning. The Long Lake Lightning organization has since ceased operations, although the combined minor hockey teams of Simpson and Imperial still use the Long Lake Lightning name.

== Championships ==
The Simpson Flyers won the Saskatchewan Amateur Hockey Association D Provincial Championship seven times including five years in a row (1967, 1969 to 1973, and 1981). The Flyers also won one Long Lake Hockey League Championship, in 1980.
