= Burstall, Saskatchewan =

Town in Saskatchewan, Canada

- Town
- Location of Burstall in Saskatchewan Burstall, Saskatchewan (Canada)
- Coordinates: 50.65547°N 109.90924°W
- Country: Canada
- Province: Saskatchewan
- Census division: Division No. 8
- Rural Municipality: Deer Forks No. 232
- Established: 1905

Area
  - Total: 1.1148 km^{2} (0.4304 sq mi)

Population (2001)
  - Total: 302
- Postal code: S0N 0H0
- Area code: 306
- Highways: Highway 321

Burstall is a small town in southwestern Saskatchewan, Canada, within the Rural Municipality of Deer Forks No. 232.

During past summers, the local Lions Club organized an activity known as Summer Slam. The main economies in the area are natural gas, wheat, and cattle farming. The area was originally settled by Germans, mostly Lutherans from South Russia. Starting around 1978, the town committee began a calendar that has everyone's birthday, anniversary and passing noted for each day.

Burstall has three churches:

- St. Paul Lutheran Church
- St. Michael’s Catholic Church
- Hope Evangelical Missionary Church

Burstall has many community facilities such as:

- Burstall Golf Course — a nine-hole course with manicured fairways, grass greens, white sand traps, water hazard, and clubhouse built in 2016.
- Community Hall - with a capacity of 300, which houses the offices of the RM of Deer Forks and the Town of Burstall
- Hockey arena
- Curling club
- Bowling alley

== Demographics ==
In the 2021 Census of Population conducted by Statistics Canada, Burstall had a population of 302 living in 140 of its 173 total private dwellings, a change of 8.6% from its 2016 population of 278. With a land area of 1.09 km^{2} (0.42 sq mi), it had a population density of 277.1/km^{2} (717.6/sq mi) in 2021.

== See also ==
- List of communities in Saskatchewan
- List of towns in Saskatchewan
- List of francophone communities in Saskatchewan
- Henry Edward Burstall
