= Rural Municipality of Enterprise No. 142 =

Rural municipality in Saskatchewan, Canada

Enterprise No. 142
- Rural municipality
- Rural Municipality of Enterprise No. 142

- Location of the RM of Enterprise No. 142 in Saskatchewan
- Coordinates: 50.376°N 109.831°W
- Country: Canada
- Province: Saskatchewan
- Region: Southwest
- Census division: 8
- SARM division: 3
- Formed: April 18, 1913

Government
  - Reeve: Wayne Freitag
  - Governing body: RM of Enterprise No. 142 Council
  - Administrator: Rolande Davis
  - Office location: Richmound

Area (2016)
  - Land: 989.73 km^{2} (382.14 sq mi)

Population (2016)
  - Total: 110
  - Density: 0.1/km^{2} (0.26/sq mi)
- Time zone: CST
  - Summer (DST): CST
- Area codes: 306 and 639

The Rural Municipality of Enterprise No. 142 (2016 population: 110) is a rural municipality (RM) in the Canadian province of Saskatchewan within Census Division No. 8 and SARM Division No. 3. It is located in the southwest portion of the province.

== History ==
The RM of Enterprise No. 142 incorporated as a rural municipality on April 18, 1913.

== Geography ==
=== Communities and localities ===
The following urban municipalities are surrounded by the RM.

Villages

- Richmound

The following unincorporated communities are within the RM.

Localities

- Horsham
- Surprise
- Tunstall

== McLaren Lake Regional Park ==
McLaren Lake Regional Park (50.2956°N 109.8841°W) is a park situated on a small, man-made lake. The lake was created with the construction of a dam in the 1960s. The regional park was created in 1961 and, soon after, 5,000 trees were planted. Four years later, in 1965, the ball diamond and concession booth were built. The following year, the lake was stocked with 250,000 walleye. The park has amenities such as a campground, beach, dock, cabin rentals, golf, and a playground. The campground has 67 campsites, washrooms, showers, canteen, and a sani-dump. The golf course is a 9-hole course with sand greens.

The lake is about 2 kilometres (1.2 mi) long, 500 metres (1,600 ft) wide and has been stocked with rainbow trout. Five wind powered aeration systems have been installed to oxygenate the lake during the winter months. Access to the park and its amenities is from Highway 635.

== Demographics ==
Population history (1981–2016)
Year	Pop.	±%
1981	383	—
1986	356	−7.0%
1991	299	−16.0%
1996	265	−11.4%
2001	225	−15.1%
2006	160	−28.9%
2011	140	−12.5%
2016	110	−21.4%
Source: Statistics Canada via Saskatchewan Bureau of Statistics

In the 2021 Census of Population conducted by Statistics Canada, the RM of Enterprise No. 142 had a population of 110 living in 49 of its 72 total private dwellings, a change of 0% from its 2016 population of 110. With a land area of 998.47 km^{2} (385.51 sq mi), it had a population density of 0.1/km^{2} (0.3/sq mi) in 2021.

In the 2016 Census of Population, the RM of Enterprise No. 142 recorded a population of 110 living in 52 of its 79 total private dwellings, a −21.4% change from its 2011 population of 140. With a land area of 989.73 km^{2} (382.14 sq mi), it had a population density of 0.1/km^{2} (0.3/sq mi) in 2016.

== Government ==
The RM of Enterprise No. 142 is governed by an elected municipal council and an appointed administrator that meets on the second Tuesday of every month. The reeve of the RM is Wayne Freitag while its administrator is Rolande Davis. The RM's office is located in Richmound.
