= Rural Municipality of Piapot No. 110 =

Rural municipality in Saskatchewan, Canada

Piapot No. 110
- Rural municipality
- Rural Municipality of Piapot No. 110

- Location of the RM of Piapot No. 110 in Saskatchewan
- Coordinates: 49.914°N 109.122°W
- Country: Canada
- Province: Saskatchewan
- Census division: 4
- SARM division: 3
- Federal riding: Cypress Hills--Grasslands
- Provincial riding: Cypress Hills
- Formed: December 8, 1913

Government
  - Reeve: John Wagner
  - Governing body: RM of Piapot No. 110 Council
  - Administrator: Jenny Robinson
  - Office location: Piapot

Area (2016)
  - Land: 1,912.81 km^{2} (738.54 sq mi)

Population (2016)
  - Total: 302
  - Density: 0.2/km^{2} (0.52/sq mi)
- Time zone: CST
  - Summer (DST): CST
- Area codes: 306 and 639
- Highway(s): Highway 1 Highway 614; Highway 724; Highway 728

The Rural Municipality of Piapot No. 110 (2016 population: 302) is a rural municipality (RM) in the Canadian province of Saskatchewan within Census Division No. 4 and SARM Division No. 3. It is located in the southwest portion of the province.

== History ==
The RM of Piapot No. 110 incorporated as a rural municipality on December 8, 1913.

== Geography ==
=== Communities and localities ===
The following unincorporated communities are within the RM.

Localities

- Carnagh
- Crane Lake
- Cross
- Edgell
- Kealey Springs
- Leghorn
- Piapot
- Sidewood
- Skull Creek

== Demographics ==
Population history (1981–2016)
Year	Pop.	±%
1981	479	—
1986	450	−6.1%
1991	392	−12.9%
1996	380	−3.1%
2001	369	−2.9%
2006	392	+6.2%
2011	324	−17.3%
2016	302	−6.8%
Source: Statistics Canada via Saskatchewan Bureau of Statistics

In the 2021 Census of Population conducted by Statistics Canada, the RM of Piapot No. 110 had a population of 280 living in 129 of its 145 total private dwellings, a change of −7.3% from its 2016 population of 302. With a land area of 1,942.87 km^{2} (750.15 sq mi), it had a population density of 0.1/km^{2} (0.4/sq mi) in 2021.

In the 2016 Census of Population, the RM of Piapot No. 110 recorded a population of 302 living in 140 of its 175 total private dwellings, a −6.8% change from its 2011 population of 324. With a land area of 1,912.81 km^{2} (738.54 sq mi), it had a population density of 0.2/km^{2} (0.4/sq mi) in 2016.

== Government ==
The RM of Piapot No. 110 is governed by an elected municipal council and an appointed administrator that meets on the second Wednesday of every month. The reeve of the RM is John Wagner while its administrator is Jenny Robinson. The RM's office is located in Piapot.

== Transportation ==
Highway	Starting point	Communities	Ending point
Highway 1	Alberta Highway 1	Piapot, Sidewood	Manitoba Highway 1
Highway 614	Highway 1	Sidewood, Skull Creek, Carnagh	Highway 706
Highway 724	Alberta Highway 515	Edgell	Highway 724
Highway 728	Highway 21	None	Highway 32

== See also ==
- List of rural municipalities in Saskatchewan
