= Rural Municipality of Glen McPherson No. 46 =

Rural municipality in Saskatchewan, Canada

Glen McPherson No. 46
- Rural municipality
- Rural Municipality of Glen McPherson No. 46
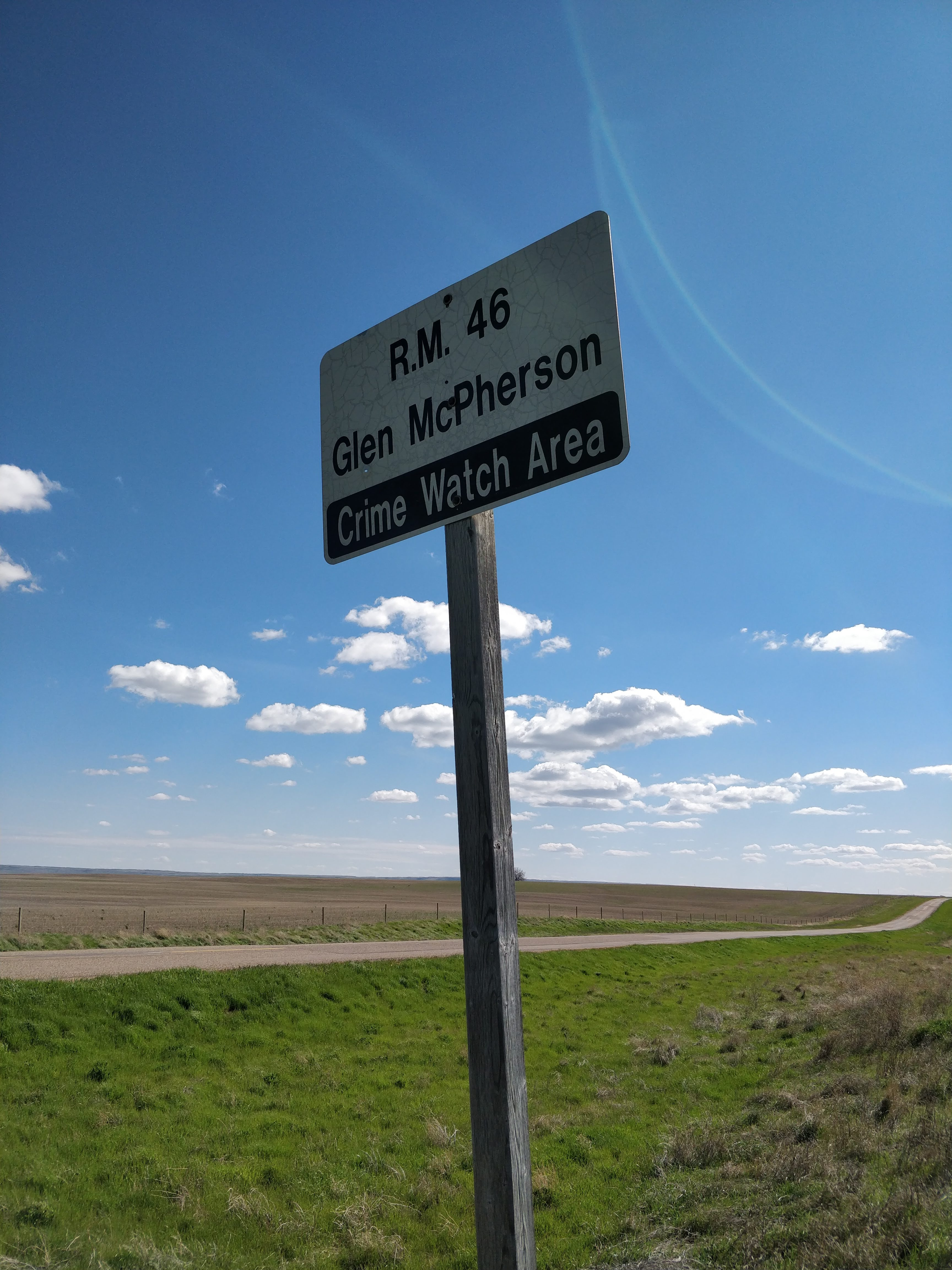
- Boundary sign

- Location of the RM of Glen McPherson No. 46 in Saskatchewan
- Coordinates: 49.393°N 107.419°W
- Country: Canada
- Province: Saskatchewan
- Census division: 3
- SARM division: 3
- Federal riding: Cypress Hills—Grasslands
- Provincial riding: Wood River
- Formed: January 1, 1913

Government
  - Reeve: Lance LaFountain
  - Governing body: RM of Glen McPherson No. 46 Council
  - Administrator: Tammi Baldock
  - Office location: Mankota

Area (2016)
  - Land: 848.29 km^{2} (327.53 sq mi)

Population (2016)
  - Total: 72
  - Density: 0.1/km^{2} (0.26/sq mi)
- Time zone: CST
  - Summer (DST): CST
- Postal code: S0H 2W0
- Area codes: 306 and 639
- Highway(s): Highway 18 / Highway 628

The Rural Municipality of Glen McPherson No. 46 (2021 population: 76) is a rural municipality (RM) in the Canadian province of Saskatchewan within Census Division No. 3 and SARM Division No. 3. It is located in the southwest portion of the province.

== History ==
The RM of Glen McPherson No. 46 incorporated as a rural municipality on January 1, 1913. When the municipality was formed in 1913, the new council considered a variety of names. One proposal would have honoured Glenelg, a Scottish village which once served as the Isle of Skye ferry terminus. Also proposed was McPherson, named for a civil servant in the municipal field who might assist the new government. The final name is a combination of these two choices - Glen McPherson. A rural post office was soon named after the RM, and operated at NE31-5-11-W3 from 1915 to 1946.

As in most rural Saskatchewan jurisdictions, taxation and public works were originally managed by a nameless Local Improvement District, subordinate to the provincial government. During this period, all roadwork and bridge-building was done by government crews, while land taxes were paid directly to Regina.

Formation of a municipal government was requested, and subsequently granted, in 1913. The school districts of Tweed, Buffalo Horn, and Divide were organized within the year, with Coriander, Banff, and South Pinto following through to 1916. Upon incorporation, the local population was estimated at 800, 275 being resident farmers. By 1917, internal estimates placed the population at 1,300 and 400 resident farmers, a number which has declined ever since.

Never possessing a single-purpose office building within its boundaries, the RM Council met inside a private residence until it burned in 1922, destroying most of the municipality's early records. Following this, meetings were held at the Broncho school, centrally located within the district. Telephone service arrived in 1927, when the Ponteix Rural Telephone Company line reached the RM, and was further extended south from Aneroid in 1931. The Canadian Pacific Railway surveyed the southern part of the RM in the same year, with the intention of building a branch line from Val Marie to Mankota. But conditions of prolonged drought and crop failure permanently halted construction, leaving Glen McPherson the somewhat unusual distinction of having never contained a single town, village, or mile of railway.

Heritage properties

There are two historical properties located within the RM.

- Billimun Church (previously called the St. Martin's Roman Catholic Church)- Constructed in 1927, in Billimun, Saskatchewan.
- Reliance Community Centre (previously called the Ferland School; Reliance School; Divide School District No. 2894.)- Constructed in 1915 as a one room school in Reliance, Saskatchewan, the building is now used as a community centre.
Gallery
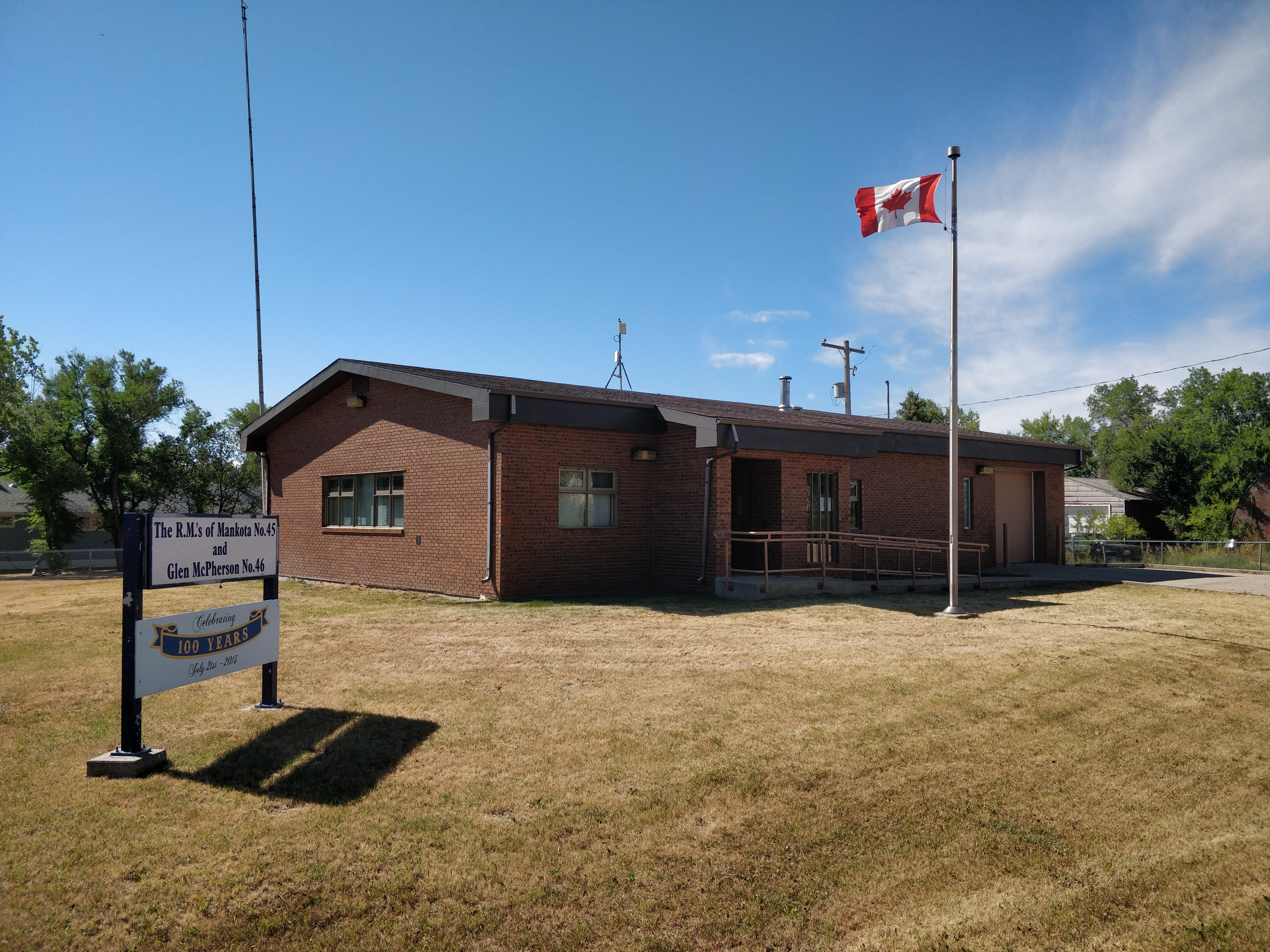
Municipal office in Mankota

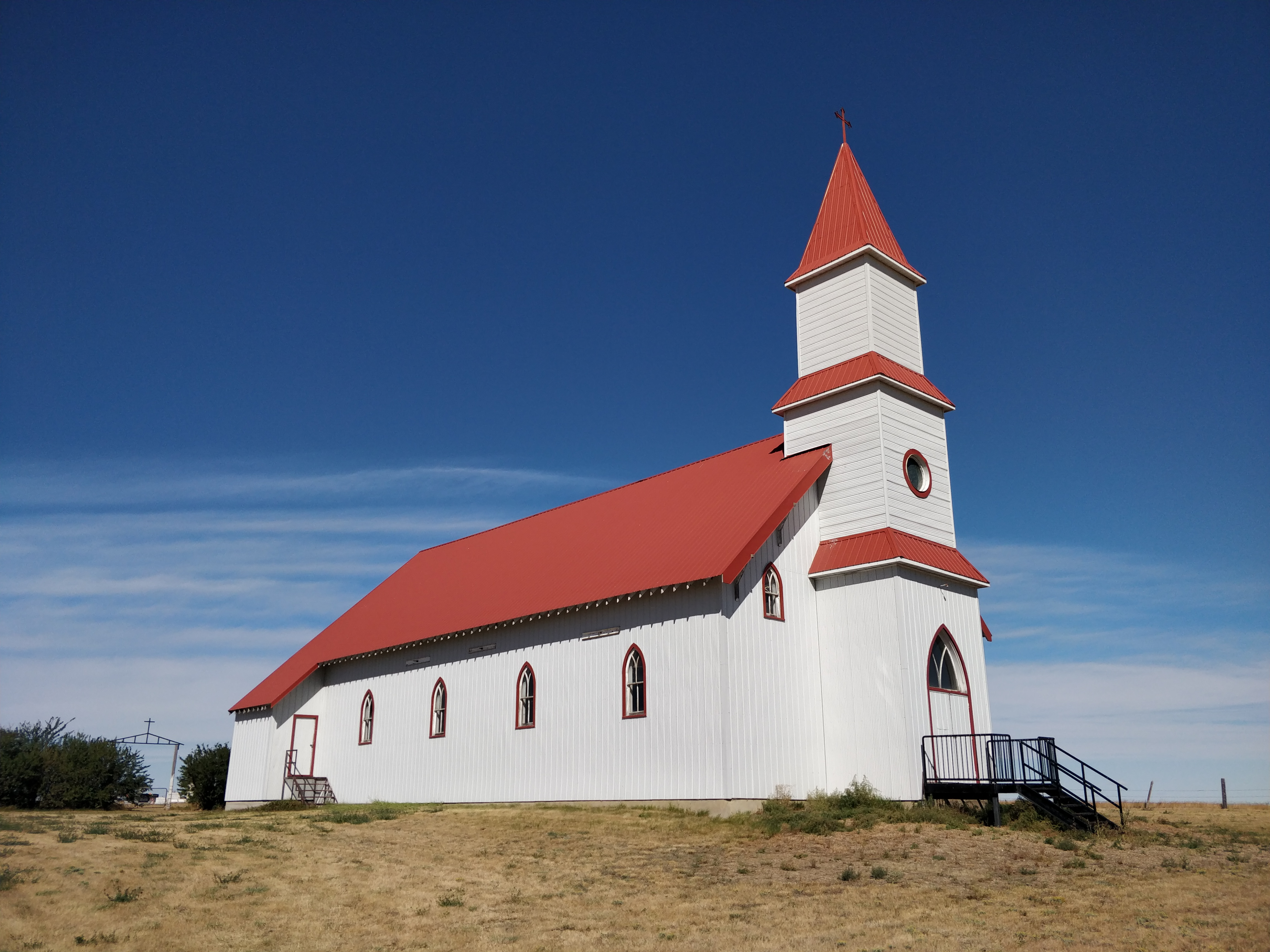
St. Martin's Church, Billimun

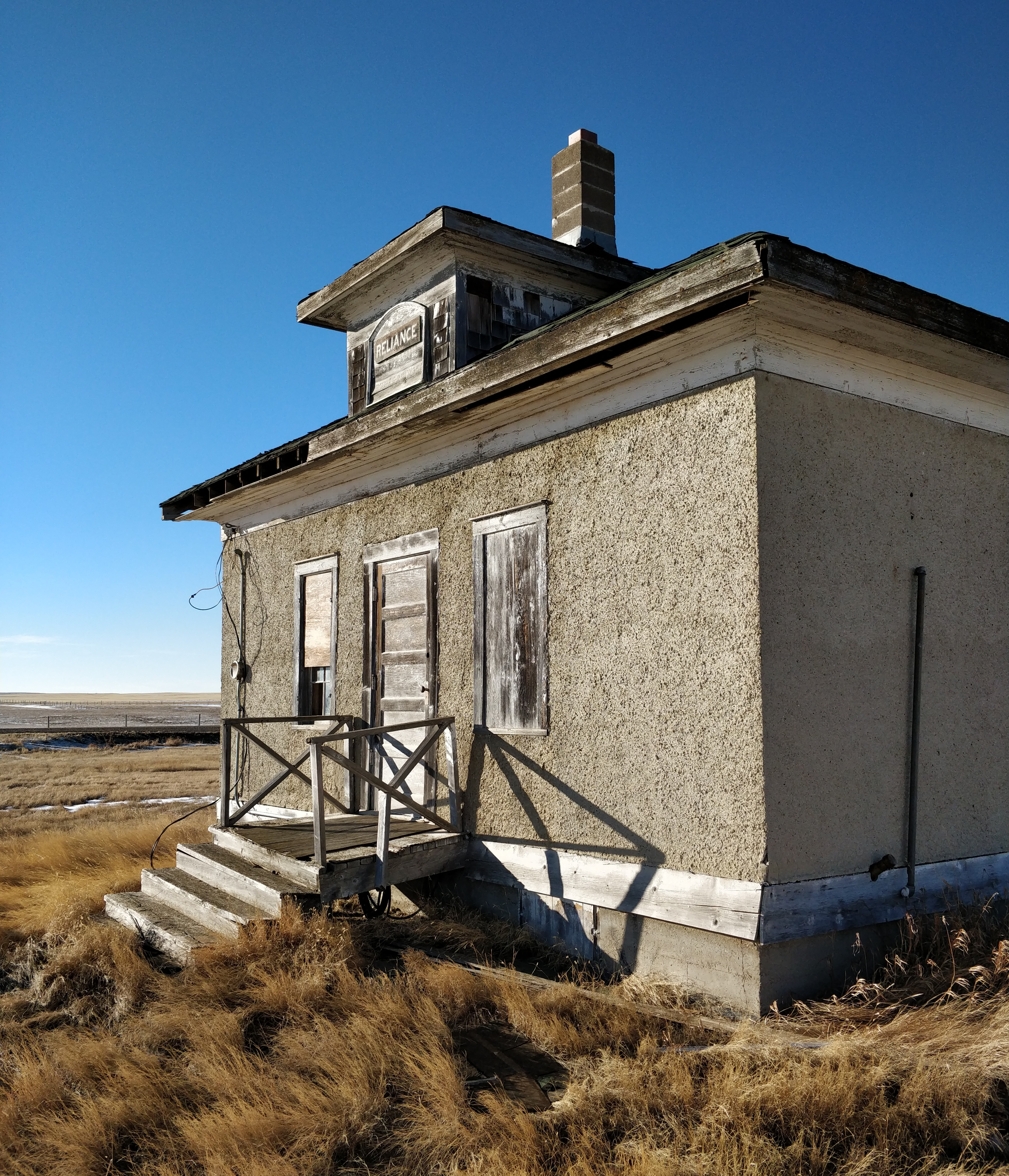
Reliance School

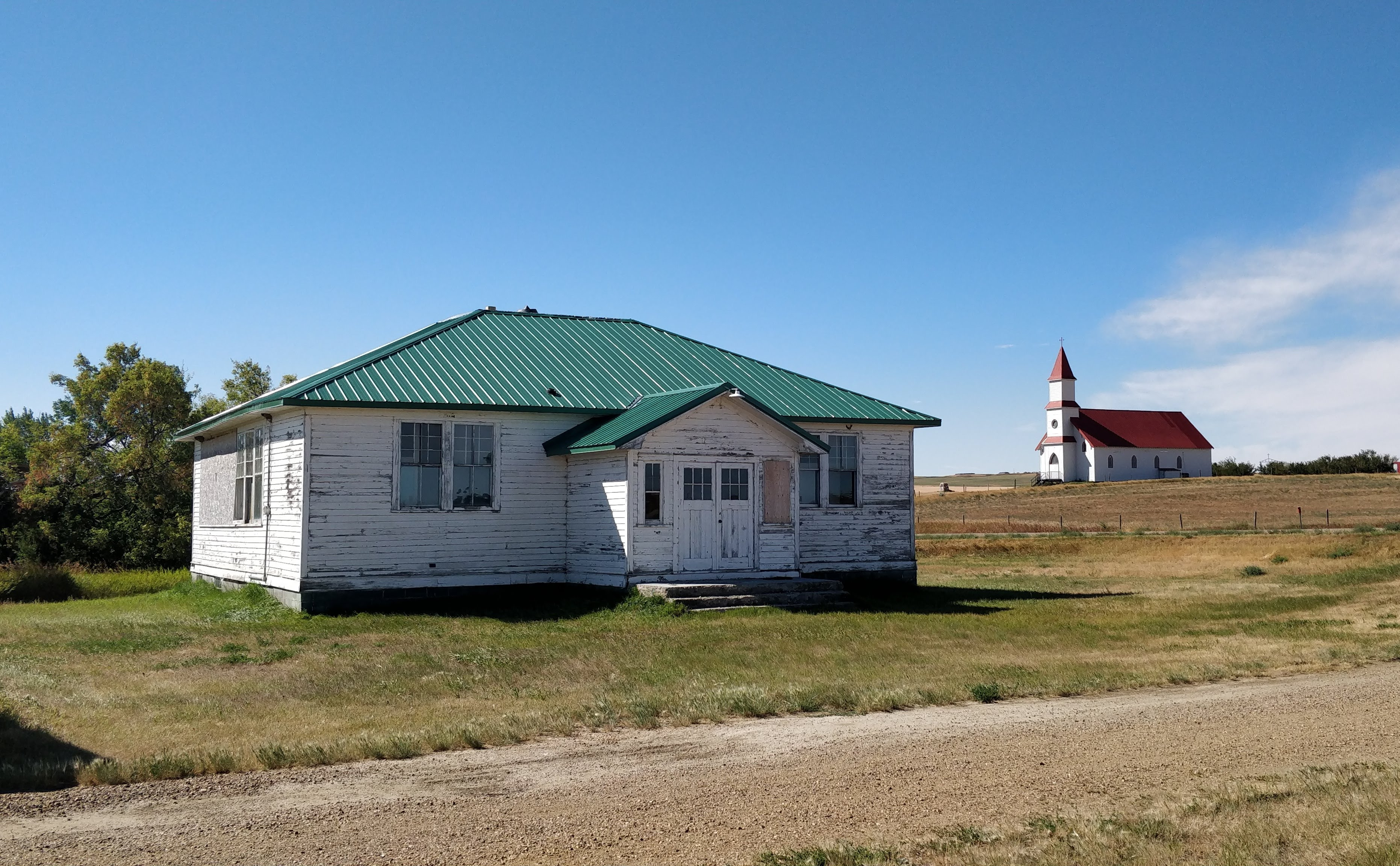
Billimun School

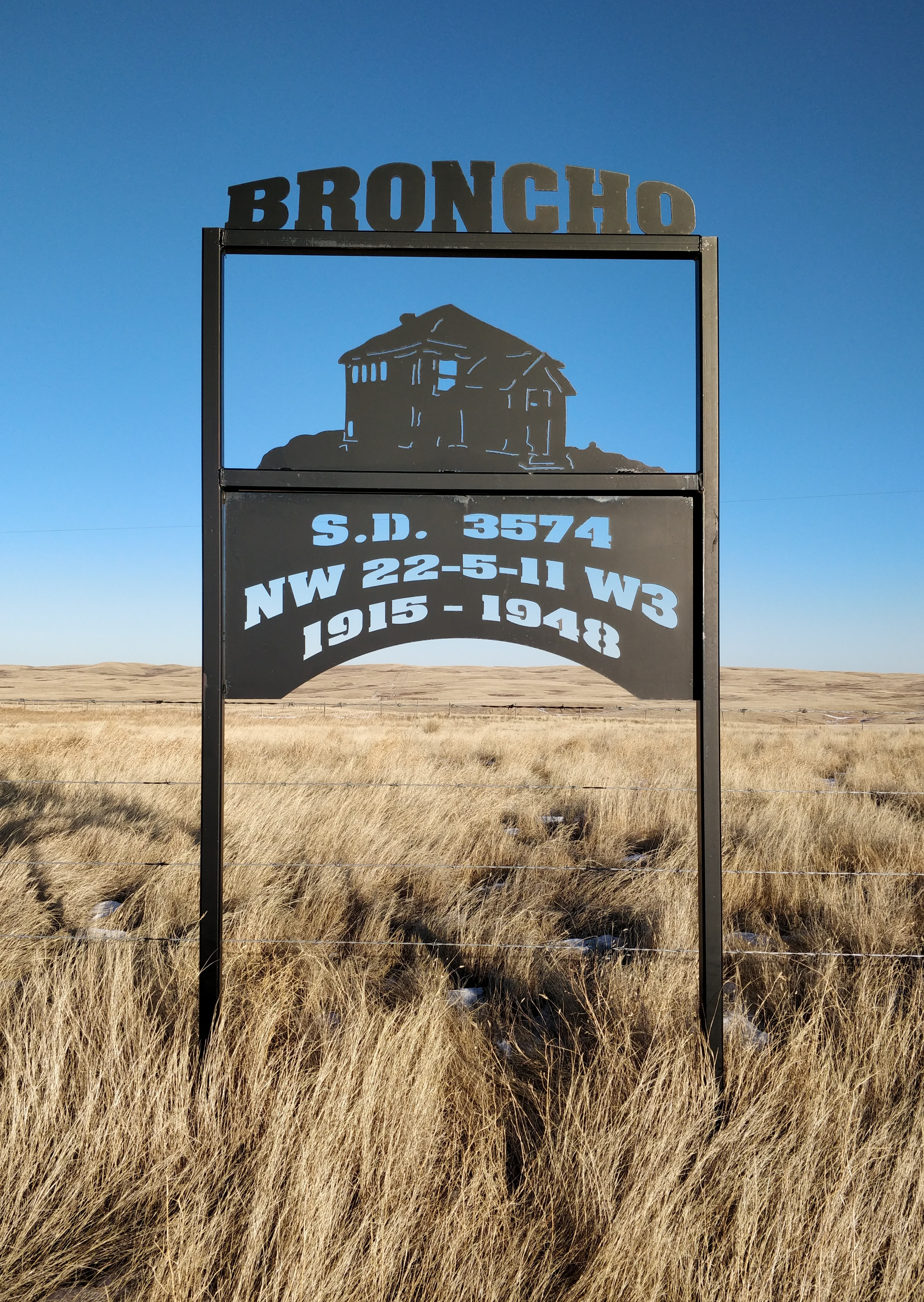
Broncho School site

== Demographics ==
Population history (1981–2016)
Year	Pop.	±%
1981	253	—
1986	226	−10.7%
1991	202	−10.6%
1996	172	−14.9%
2001	126	−26.7%
2006	112	−11.1%
2011	73	−34.8%
2016	72	−1.4%
2021	76	+5.6%
Source: Statistics Canada via Saskatchewan Bureau of Statistics

In the 2021 Census of Population conducted by Statistics Canada, the RM of Glen McPherson No. 46 had a population of 76 living in 34 of its 40 total private dwellings, a change of 5.6% from its 2016 population of 72. With a land area of 845.13 km^{2} (326.31 sq mi), it had a population density of 0.1/km^{2} (0.2/sq mi) in 2021.

In the 2016 Census of Population, the RM of Glen McPherson No. 46 recorded a population of 72 living in 33 of its 39 total private dwellings, a −1.4% change from its 2011 population of 73. With a land area of 848.29 km^{2} (327.53 sq mi), it had a population density of 0.1/km^{2} (0.2/sq mi) in 2016. At its population of 72, the RM of Glen McPherson No. 46 is the least populated rural municipality in Saskatchewan.

In 2016, 60 residents of the RM of Glen McPherson No. 46 reported English as their mother tongue, 10 French, and 5 a Germanic language, while 10 reported knowledge of both English and French and 5 reported speaking French at home.

== Government ==
The RM of Glen McPherson No. 46 is governed by an elected municipal council and an appointed administrator that meets on the second Thursday of every month. The reeve of the RM is Lance LaFountain while its administrator is Tammi Baldock. The RM's office is located in Mankota.

The RM of Glen McPherson No. 46 is one of 103 RMs in Saskatchewan that did not hold municipal elections in 2018, as every candidate was acclaimed in their district. Amalgamation with neighbouring Mankota has been discussed for more than 50 years, as both governments already share an administrative employee and an email address. Despite this possibility, local officials state that Glen McPherson's boundaries are likely to remain intact because of its sound finances and a desire for cultural continuity among its few remaining ratepayers.

== See also ==
- Loving County, Texas - the least-populated county in the United States
- Municipal District of Ranchland No. 66 - the least-populated rural municipality in neighbouring Alberta, with 92 residents in 2016
