= Rural Municipality of Big Stick No. 141 =

Rural municipality in Saskatchewan, Canada

Big Stick No. 141
- Rural municipality
- Rural Municipality of Big Stick No. 141

- Location of the RM of Big Stick No. 141 in Saskatchewan
- Coordinates: 50.185°N 109.527°W
- Country: Canada
- Province: Saskatchewan
- Census division: 8
- SARM division: 3
- Federal riding: Cypress Hills—Grasslands
- Provincial riding: Cypress Hills
- Formed: December 11, 1911

Government
  - Reeve: Edward Feil
  - Governing body: RM of Big Stick No. 141 Council
  - Administrator: Melinda Hammer
  - Office location: Golden Prairie

Area (2016)
  - Land: 821.4 km^{2} (317.1 sq mi)

Population (2016)
  - Total: 136
  - Density: 0.2/km^{2} (0.52/sq mi)
- Time zone: CST
  - Summer (DST): CST
- Postal code: S0N 0Y0
- Area codes: 306 and 639

The Rural Municipality of Big Stick No. 141 (2016 population: 136) is a rural municipality (RM) in the Canadian province of Saskatchewan within Census Division No. 8 and SARM Division No. 3. It is located in southwest portion of the province.

== History ==
The RM of Big Stick No. 141 incorporated as a rural municipality on December 11, 1911. The RM takes its name from the alkali Bigstick Lake within its boundaries, which was named after the Big Stick Trail between Maple Creek and the South Saskatchewan River – notable for a large, solitary tree along its route. A Big Stick Lake post office also operated at SE-27-14-26-W3 from 1911 to 1925.

== Geography ==
=== Communities and localities ===
The following urban municipalities are surrounded by the RM.

Villages

- Golden Prairie

== Demographics ==
Population history (1981–2016)
Year	Pop.	±%
1981	287	—
1986	263	−8.4%
1991	259	−1.5%
1996	215	−17.0%
2001	196	−8.8%
2006	182	−7.1%
2011	148	−18.7%
2016	136	−8.1%
Source: Statistics Canada via Saskatchewan Bureau of Statistics

In the 2021 Census of Population conducted by Statistics Canada, the RM of Big Stick No. 141 had a population of 148 living in 60 of its 68 total private dwellings, a change of 8.8% from its 2016 population of 136. With a land area of 831.87 km^{2} (321.19 sq mi), it had a population density of 0.2/km^{2} (0.5/sq mi) in 2021.

In the 2016 Census of Population, the RM of Big Stick No. 141 recorded a population of 136 living in 57 of its 74 total private dwellings, a −8.1% change from its 2011 population of 148. With a land area of 821.4 km^{2} (317.1 sq mi), it had a population density of 0.2/km^{2} (0.4/sq mi) in 2016.

== Government ==
The RM of Big Stick No. 141 is governed by an elected municipal council and an appointed administrator that meets on the first Wednesday of every month. The reeve of the RM is Edward Feil while its administrator is Melinda Hammer. The RM's office is located in Golden Prairie.
