= Estuary Ferry =

Cable ferry in Saskatchewan, Canada

Coordinates: 50.945°N 109.803°W

The Estuary Ferry is a cable ferry in the Canadian province of Saskatchewan near the ghost town of Estuary. The ferry crosses the South Saskatchewan River, carrying Highway 635 / Highway 741 across the river.

The six-car ferry is operated by the Saskatchewan Ministry of Highways and Infrastructure. The ferry is free of tolls and operates between 7:00 am and midnight, during the ice-free season. The ferry has a length of 16.7 metres (55 ft), a width of 6.7 metres (22 ft), and a weight limit of 18.5 tonnes (18.2 long tons; 20.4 short tons).

The ferry typically carries 8000 vehicles each year.

== See also ==
- List of crossings of the South Saskatchewan River
- Transportation in Saskatchewan
