= List of rural municipalities in Saskatchewan =

Rural municipalities of Saskatchewan
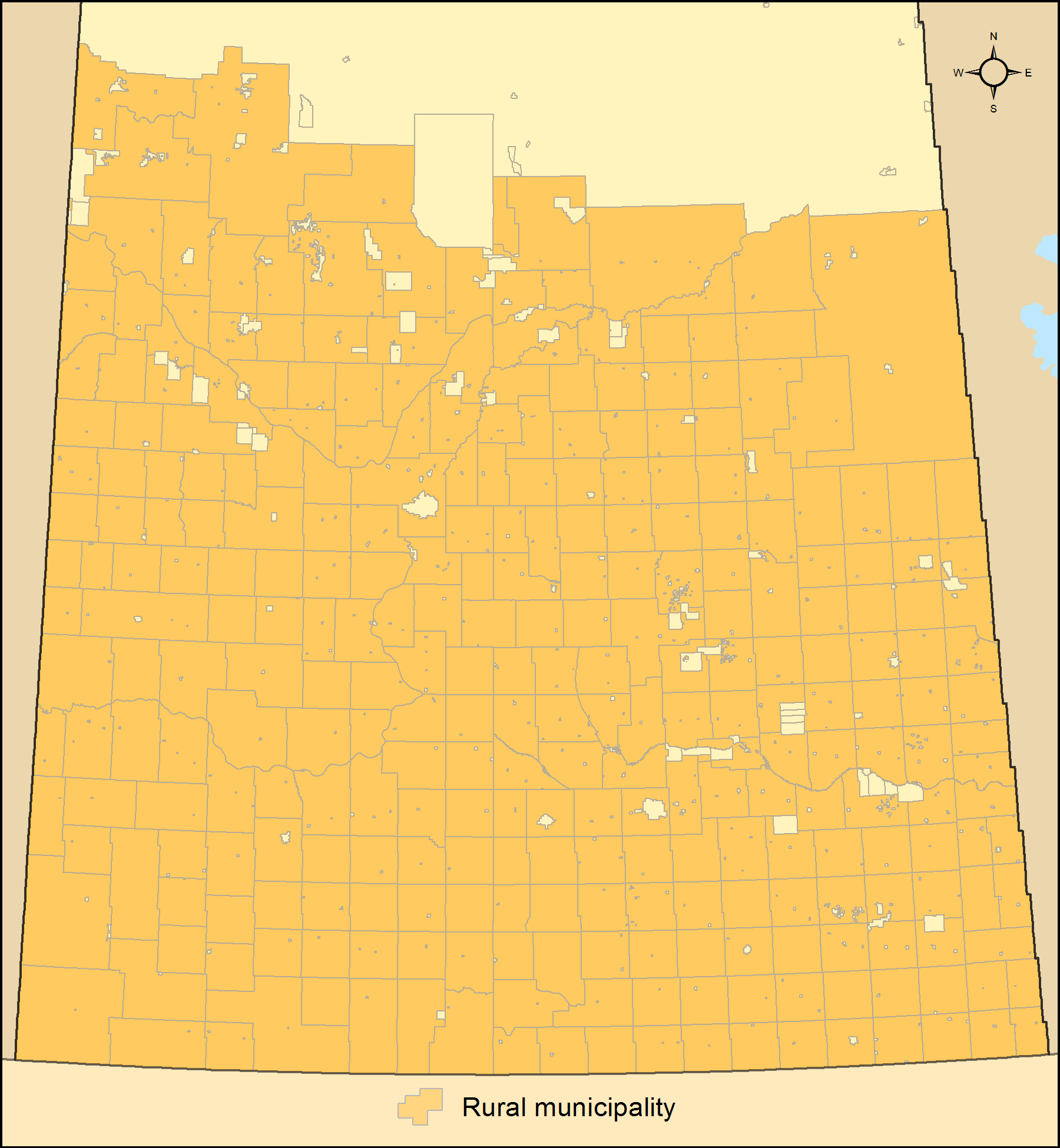
- Distribution of Saskatchewan's 296 rural municipalities
- Location: Province of Saskatchewan
- Number: 296
- Populations: 72 (Glen McPherson) – 8,568 (Corman Park)
- Areas: 445.25 km^{2} (Hillsborough) – 12,462.61 km^{2} (Hudson Bay)
- Government: Rural municipality
- Subdivisions: Organized hamlets, special service areas, hamlets, unincorporated localities

A rural municipality (RM) is a type of incorporated municipality in the Canadian province of Saskatchewan. A rural municipality is created by the Minister of Municipal Relations by ministerial order via section 49 of The Municipalities Act.

Saskatchewan has 296 rural municipalities, which are located in the central and southern portions of the province. They had a cumulative population of 176,535 and an average population of 596 in the 2016 Census of Population. Saskatchewan's largest and smallest rural municipalities are the RM of Corman Park No. 344 and the RM of Glen McPherson No. 46 with populations of 8,568 and 72 respectively.

The northern half of the province does not lie within any rural municipality, but is rather administered by the provincial government through the Northern Saskatchewan Administration District.

== List ==
Rural municipality (RM)	RM No.	SARM Div. No.	Census Div. No.	Incorporation date	Population (2016)	Population (2011)	Change (%)	Land area (km^{2})	Population density (per km^{2})
Aberdeen No. 373	373	5	15	December 13, 1909	1,379	1,016	+35.7%	673.42	2.0/km^{2}
Abernethy No. 186	186	1	6	December 11, 1911	362	387	−6.5%	779.42	0.5/km^{2}
Antelope Park No. 322	322	6	13	December 11, 1911	130	150	−13.3%	612.9	0.2/km^{2}
Antler No. 61	61	1	1	December 13, 1909	523	577	−9.4%	832.81	0.6/km^{2}
Arborfield No. 456	456	4	14	January 1, 1913	343	453	−24.3%	1,416.01	0.2/km^{2}
Argyle No. 1	1	1	1	December 19, 1912	290	270	+7.4%	579.88	0.5/km^{2}
Arlington No. 79	79	3	4	January 1, 1913	366	345	+6.1%	846.79	0.4/km^{2}
Arm River No. 252	252	5	11	December 13, 1909	250	249	+0.4%	725.3	0.3/km^{2}
Auvergne No. 76	76	3	3	January 1, 1913	412	354	+16.4%	854.46	0.5/km^{2}
Baildon No. 131	131	2	7	December 9, 1912	620	594	+4.4%	846.21	0.7/km^{2}
Barrier Valley No. 397	397	4	14	October 29, 1917	431	498	−13.5%	819.99	0.5/km^{2}
Battle River No. 438	438	6	12	December 12, 1910	1,154	1,099	+5.0%	1,061.4	1.1/km^{2}
Bayne No. 371	371	5	15	December 12, 1910	467	493	−5.3%	802.93	0.6/km^{2}
Beaver River No. 622	622	6	17	January 1, 1978	1,216	1,017	+19.6%	2,370.09	0.5/km^{2}
Bengough No. 40	40	2	2	January 1, 1913	281	329	−14.6%	1,036.91	0.3/km^{2}
Benson No. 35	35	1	1	December 13, 1909	472	490	−3.7%	836.39	0.6/km^{2}
Big Arm No. 251	251	5	11	December 11, 1911	191	200	−4.5%	699.32	0.3/km^{2}
Big Quill No. 308	308	4	10	December 13, 1909	519	587	−11.6%	739.86	0.7/km^{2}
Big River No. 555	555	5	16	October 1, 1977	889	855	+4.0%	2,487.82	0.4/km^{2}
Big Stick No. 141	141	3	8	December 11, 1911	136	148	−8.1%	821.4	0.2/km^{2}
Biggar No. 347	347	6	12	December 11, 1911	798	820	−2.7%	1,598.56	0.5/km^{2}
Birch Hills No. 460	460	5	15	December 11, 1911	656	663	−1.1%	554.07	1.2/km^{2}
Bjorkdale No. 426	426	4	14	January 1, 1913	851	900	−5.4%	1,460.5	0.6/km^{2}
Blaine Lake No. 434	434	5	16	December 9, 1912	291	288	+1.0%	799.69	0.4/km^{2}
Blucher No. 343	343	5	11	December 13, 1909	2,006	1,876	+6.9%	789.64	2.5/km^{2}
Bone Creek No. 108	108	3	4	December 11, 1911	394	340	+15.9%	847.16	0.5/km^{2}
Bratt's Lake No. 129	129	2	6	January 1, 1913	315	350	−10.0%	844.94	0.4/km^{2}
Britannia No. 502	502	6	17	December 13, 1909	2,153	1,734	+24.2%	950.39	2.3/km^{2}
Brock No. 64	64	1	1	December 12, 1910	267	238	+12.2%	797.13	0.3/km^{2}
Brokenshell No. 68	68	2	2	December 13, 1909	312	308	+1.3%	850.01	0.4/km^{2}
Browning No. 34	34	1	1	December 11, 1911	375	399	−6.0%	823.38	0.5/km^{2}
Buchanan No. 304	304	4	9	January 1, 1913	301	406	−25.9%	738.8	0.4/km^{2}
Buckland No. 491	491	5	15	December 11, 1911	3,375	3,658	−7.7%	791.69	4.3/km^{2}
Buffalo No. 409	409	6	13	December 13, 1909	506	506	0.0%	1,222.08	0.4/km^{2}
Calder No. 241	241	4	9	January 1, 1913	370	322	+14.9%	807.27	0.5/km^{2}
Caledonia No. 99	99	2	2	December 13, 1909	245	257	−4.7%	845.68	0.3/km^{2}
Cambria No. 6	6	1	2	December 13, 1909	309	304	+1.6%	814.14	0.4/km^{2}
Cana No. 214	214	1	5	December 13, 1909	867	858	+1.0%	820.9	1.1/km^{2}
Canaan No. 225	225	3	7	January 1, 1913	140	149	−6.0%	549.09	0.3/km^{2}
Canwood No. 494	494	5	16	January 1, 1913	1,381	1,424	−3.0%	1,945.2	0.7/km^{2}
Carmichael No. 109	109	3	4	December 9, 1912	444	440	+0.9%	846.4	0.5/km^{2}
Caron No. 162	162	2	7	December 9, 1912	576	516	+11.6%	569.87	1.0/km^{2}
Chaplin No. 164	164	2	7	January 1, 1913	113	147	−23.1%	802.74	0.1/km^{2}
Chester No. 125	125	1	5	December 13, 1909	383	373	+2.7%	837.08	0.5/km^{2}
Chesterfield No. 261	261	3	8	December 9, 1912	481	480	+0.2%	1,943.29	0.2/km^{2}
Churchbridge No. 211	211	1	5	January 1, 1913	619	673	−8.0%	958.57	0.6/km^{2}
Clayton No. 333	333	4	9	January 1, 1913	592	669	−11.5%	1,401.57	0.4/km^{2}
Clinworth No. 230	230	3	8	December 9, 1912	154	211	−27.0%	1,432.75	0.1/km^{2}
Coalfields No. 4	4	1	1	January 1, 1913	368	382	−3.7%	819.52	0.4/km^{2}
Colonsay No. 342	342	5	11	December 13, 1909	269	240	+12.1%	549.99	0.5/km^{2}
Connaught No. 457	457	4	14	December 11, 1911	586	629	−6.8%	853.11	0.7/km^{2}
Corman Park No. 344	344	5	11	January 1, 1970	8,568	8,277	+3.5%	1,911.35	4.5/km^{2}
Cote No. 271	271	4	9	December 12, 1910	548	580	−5.5%	879.8	0.6/km^{2}
Coteau No. 255	255	3	7	December 12, 1910	475	420	+13.1%	899.27	0.5/km^{2}
Coulee No. 136	136	3	7	December 12, 1910	563	582	−3.3%	843.69	0.7/km^{2}
Craik No. 222	222	2	7	December 9, 1912	259	276	−6.2%	885.41	0.3/km^{2}
Cupar No. 218	218	2	6	December 13, 1909	503	554	−9.2%	912.96	0.6/km^{2}
Cut Knife No. 439	439	6	13	December 13, 1909	364	359	+1.4%	653	0.6/km^{2}
Cymri No. 36	36	1	2	December 13, 1909	549	524	+4.8%	832.32	0.7/km^{2}
Deer Forks No. 232	232	3	8	January 1, 1913	109	223	−51.1%	736.26	0.1/km^{2}
Douglas No. 436	436	6	16	December 13, 1909	350	331	+5.7%	820.37	0.4/km^{2}
Duck Lake No. 463	463	5	15	January 1, 1913	1,004	846	+18.7%	1,046.93	1.0/km^{2}
Dufferin No. 190	190	2	6	December 9, 1912	559	491	+13.8%	957.04	0.6/km^{2}
Dundurn No. 314	314	5	11	December 13, 1909	2,404	1,148	+109.4%	807.94	3.0/km^{2}
Eagle Creek No. 376	376	5	12	December 13, 1909	595	580	+2.6%	833.08	0.7/km^{2}
Edenwold No. 158	158	2	6	December 9, 1912	4,490	4,132	+8.7%	849.04	5.3/km^{2}
Elcapo No. 154	154	1	5	December 12, 1910	488	481	+1.5%	846.04	0.6/km^{2}
Eldon No. 471	471	6	17	December 13, 1909	750	751	−0.1%	1,007.59	0.7/km^{2}
Elfros No. 307	307	4	10	December 13, 1909	391	432	−9.5%	697.34	0.6/km^{2}
Elmsthorpe No. 100	100	2	2	December 12, 1910	226	210	+7.6%	843.12	0.3/km^{2}
Emerald No. 277	277	4	10	December 12, 1910	405	447	−9.4%	854.44	0.5/km^{2}
Enfield No. 194	194	2	7	December 13, 1909	226	270	−16.3%	1,014.1	0.2/km^{2}
Enniskillen No. 3	3	1	1	December 13, 1909	459	452	+1.5%	834.67	0.5/km^{2}
Enterprise No. 142	142	3	8	April 18, 1913	110	140	−21.4%	989.73	0.1/km^{2}
Estevan No. 5	5	1	1	December 12, 1910	1,370	1,139	+20.3%	773.38	1.8/km^{2}
Excel No. 71	71	2	3	January 1, 1913	391	427	−8.4%	1,122.02	0.3/km^{2}
Excelsior No. 166	166	3	7	December 13, 1909	806	959	−16.0%	1,198.35	0.7/km^{2}
Eye Hill No. 382	382	6	13	December 12, 1910	590	614	−3.9%	798.3	0.7/km^{2}
Eyebrow No. 193	193	2	7	December 13, 1909	195	230	−15.2%	835.04	0.2/km^{2}
Fertile Belt No. 183	183	1	5	January 1, 1913	781	785	−0.5%	1,006.67	0.8/km^{2}
Fertile Valley No. 285	285	5	12	December 13, 1909	539	511	+5.5%	1,016.37	0.5/km^{2}
Fillmore No. 96	96	1	2	December 13, 1909	223	255	−12.5%	828.33	0.3/km^{2}
Fish Creek No. 402	402	5	15	January 1, 1913	345	304	+13.5%	597.9	0.6/km^{2}
Flett's Springs No. 429	429	5	15	December 13, 1909	732	751	−2.5%	844.61	0.9/km^{2}
Foam Lake No. 276	276	4	10	December 12, 1910	586	587	−0.2%	1,345.98	0.4/km^{2}
Fox Valley No. 171	171	3	8	October 29, 1913	330	345	−4.3%	1,253.79	0.3/km^{2}
Francis No. 127	127	1	6	December 13, 1909	674	676	−0.3%	1,106.79	0.6/km^{2}
Frenchman Butte No. 501	501	6	17	January 1, 1954	1,494	1,438	+3.9%	1,927.39	0.8/km^{2}
Frontier No. 19	19	3	4	January 1, 1913	326	371	−12.1%	1,675.02	0.2/km^{2}
Garden River No. 490	490	5	15	January 1, 1913	727	641	+13.4%	662.9	1.1/km^{2}
Garry No. 245	245	4	9	January 1, 1913	364	412	−11.7%	853.59	0.4/km^{2}
Glen Bain No. 105	105	3	3	December 11, 1911	180	205	−12.2%	843.4	0.2/km^{2}
Glen McPherson No. 46	46	3	3	January 1, 1913	72	73	−1.4%	848.29	0.1/km^{2}
Glenside No. 377	377	6	12	December 13, 1909	248	267	−7.1%	905.74	0.3/km^{2}
Golden West No. 95	95	1	1	December 13, 1909	291	315	−7.6%	790.72	0.4/km^{2}
Good Lake No. 274	274	4	9	January 1, 1913	747	684	+9.2%	809.94	0.9/km^{2}
Grandview No. 349	349	6	13	December 11, 1911	348	350	−0.6%	715.38	0.5/km^{2}
Grant No. 372	372	5	15	December 13, 1909	466	425	+9.6%	666.16	0.7/km^{2}
Grass Lake No. 381	381	6	13	December 13, 1909	399	369	+8.1%	801.29	0.5/km^{2}
Grassy Creek No. 78	78	3	4	January 1, 1913	364	284	+28.2%	837.4	0.4/km^{2}
Gravelbourg No. 104	104	2	3	December 9, 1912	472	306	+54.2%	841.98	0.6/km^{2}
Grayson No. 184	184	1	5	January 1, 1913	512	478	+7.1%	874.77	0.6/km^{2}
Great Bend No. 405	405	6	16	December 12, 1910	509	499	+2.0%	830.58	0.6/km^{2}
Griffin No. 66	66	1	2	December 13, 1909	438	398	+10.1%	816.59	0.5/km^{2}
Gull Lake No. 139	139	3	8	January 1, 1913	201	201	0.0%	836.41	0.2/km^{2}
Happy Valley No. 10	10	2	2	January 1, 1913	139	148	−6.1%	812.74	0.2/km^{2}
Happyland No. 231	231	3	8	January 1, 1913	249	284	−12.3%	1,259	0.2/km^{2}
Harris No. 316	316	5	12	December 12, 1910	193	224	−13.8%	805.42	0.2/km^{2}
Hart Butte No. 11	11	2	3	January 1, 1913	252	264	−4.5%	841.98	0.3/km^{2}
Hazel Dell No. 335	335	4	9	January 1, 1913	515	511	+0.8%	1,394.02	0.4/km^{2}
Hazelwood No. 94	94	1	1	January 1, 1913	230	246	−6.5%	743.81	0.3/km^{2}
Heart's Hill No. 352	352	6	13	November 15, 1910	244	260	−6.2%	838.37	0.3/km^{2}
Hillsborough No. 132	132	2	7	January 1, 1913	101	114	−11.4%	445.25	0.2/km^{2}
Hillsdale No. 440	440	6	13	January 1, 1913	553	563	−1.8%	1,028.72	0.5/km^{2}
Hoodoo No. 401	401	5	15	January 1, 1913	675	706	−4.4%	810.58	0.8/km^{2}
Hudson Bay No. 394	394	4	14	May 1, 1977	1,114	1,122	−0.7%	12,462.61	0.1/km^{2}
Humboldt No. 370	370	5	15	January 1, 1913	935	885	+5.6%	796.69	1.2/km^{2}
Huron No. 223	223	2	7	December 12, 1910	198	196	+1.0%	842.11	0.2/km^{2}
Indian Head No. 156	156	1	6	August 6, 1884	336	380	−11.6%	759.98	0.4/km^{2}
Insinger No. 275	275	4	9	January 1, 1913	315	325	−3.1%	849.38	0.4/km^{2}
Invergordon No. 430	430	5	15	December 11, 1911	565	651	−13.2%	854.19	0.7/km^{2}
Invermay No. 305	305	4	9	December 11, 1911	325	334	−2.7%	729.44	0.4/km^{2}
Ituna Bon Accord No. 246	246	4	10	January 1, 1913	374	435	−14.0%	837.23	0.4/km^{2}
Kellross No. 247	247	4	10	December 13, 1909	305	362	−15.7%	834.09	0.4/km^{2}
Kelvington No. 366	366	4	14	January 1, 1913	398	494	−19.4%	862.24	0.5/km^{2}
Key West No. 70	70	2	2	December 12, 1910	255	287	−11.1%	825.26	0.3/km^{2}
Keys No. 303	303	4	9	January 1, 1913	390	417	−6.5%	661.61	0.6/km^{2}
Kindersley No. 290	290	6	13	December 12, 1910	1,049	987	+6.3%	2,112.68	0.5/km^{2}
King George No. 256	256	3	7	December 11, 1911	226	217	+4.1%	831.97	0.3/km^{2}
Kingsley No. 124	124	1	5	December 12, 1910	444	421	+5.5%	844.06	0.5/km^{2}
Kinistino No. 459	459	5	15	December 11, 1911	554	613	−9.6%	948.46	0.6/km^{2}
Lac Pelletier No. 107	107	3	4	January 1, 1913	546	607	−10.0%	849.27	0.6/km^{2}
Lacadena No. 228	228	3	8	December 12, 1910	535	572	−6.5%	1,895.97	0.3/km^{2}
Laird No. 404	404	5	15	December 12, 1910	1,387	1,240	+11.9%	729.98	1.9/km^{2}
Lajord No. 128	128	2	6	December 13, 1909	1,232	993	+24.1%	943.87	1.3/km^{2}
Lake Alma No. 8	8	2	2	May 5, 1913	242	250	−3.2%	822.47	0.3/km^{2}
Lake Johnston No. 102	102	2	3	December 9, 1912	170	160	+6.3%	567.24	0.3/km^{2}
Lake Lenore No. 399	399	5	15	January 1, 1913	587	536	+9.5%	723.53	0.8/km^{2}
Lake of the Rivers No. 72	72	2	3	December 11, 1911	279	302	−7.6%	677.5	0.4/km^{2}
Lakeland No. 521	521	5	15	August 1, 1977	915	869	+5.3%	493.44	1.9/km^{2}
Lakeside No. 338	338	4	10	December 12, 1910	415	387	+7.2%	636.8	0.7/km^{2}
Lakeview No. 337	337	4	10	December 13, 1909	368	336	+9.5%	724.89	0.5/km^{2}
Langenburg No. 181	181	1	5	January 1, 1913	557	572	−2.6%	675.42	0.8/km^{2}
Last Mountain Valley No. 250	250	5	11	December 13, 1909	275	267	+3.0%	871.17	0.3/km^{2}
Laurier No. 38	38	2	2	December 13, 1909	296	321	−7.8%	840.4	0.4/km^{2}
Lawtonia No. 135	135	3	7	December 12, 1910	346	434	−20.3%	845.28	0.4/km^{2}
Leask No. 464	464	5	16	December 9, 1912	686	775	−11.5%	1,257.36	0.5/km^{2}
Leroy No. 339	339	5	10	January 1, 1913	502	490	+2.4%	839.29	0.6/km^{2}
Lipton No. 217	217	1	6	December 11, 1911	381	424	−10.1%	813.69	0.5/km^{2}
Livingston No. 331	331	4	9	January 1, 1913	281	311	−9.6%	1,338.85	0.2/km^{2}
Lomond No. 37	37	1	2	December 11, 1911	296	304	−2.6%	833.95	0.4/km^{2}
Lone Tree No. 18	18	3	4	December 8, 1913	150	145	+3.4%	838	0.2/km^{2}
Longlaketon No. 219	219	2	6	December 12, 1910	1,016	962	+5.6%	1,024.59	1.0/km^{2}
Loon Lake No. 561	561	6	17	January 1, 1978	756	725	+4.3%	2,805.1	0.3/km^{2}
Loreburn No. 254	254	5	11	December 12, 1910	327	346	−5.5%	966.78	0.3/km^{2}
Lost River No. 313	313	5	11	December 11, 1911	242	209	+15.8%	549.92	0.4/km^{2}
Lumsden No. 189	189	2	6	December 9, 1912	1,938	1,772	+9.4%	817.13	2.4/km^{2}
Manitou Lake No. 442	442	6	13	December 12, 1910	573	547	+4.8%	850.95	0.7/km^{2}
Mankota No. 45	45	3	3	January 1, 1913	292	322	−9.3%	1,696.35	0.2/km^{2}
Maple Bush No. 224	224	2	7	December 13, 1909	192	167	+15.0%	811.95	0.2/km^{2}
Maple Creek No. 111	111	3	4	December 10, 1917	1,068	1,154	−7.5%	3,243.33	0.3/km^{2}
Mariposa No. 350	350	6	13	December 12, 1910	205	220	−6.8%	636.73	0.3/km^{2}
Marquis No. 191	191	2	7	December 11, 1911	297	212	+40.1%	801.42	0.4/km^{2}
Marriott No. 317	317	6	12	December 12, 1910	366	372	−1.6%	843.29	0.4/km^{2}
Martin No. 122	122	1	5	January 1, 1913	289	333	−13.2%	556.5	0.5/km^{2}
Maryfield No. 91	91	1	1	December 9, 1912	324	319	+1.6%	759.58	0.4/km^{2}
Mayfield No. 406	406	6	16	December 13, 1909	377	389	−3.1%	782.5	0.5/km^{2}
McCraney No. 282	282	5	11	December 13, 1909	310	307	+1.0%	948.55	0.3/km^{2}
McKillop No. 220	220	2	6	December 13, 1909	732	575	+27.3%	668.44	1.1/km^{2}
McLeod No. 185	185	1	5	January 1, 1913	365	446	−18.2%	886.6	0.4/km^{2}
Meadow Lake No. 588	588	6	17	February 1, 1976	2,501	2,667	−6.2%	6,306.17	0.4/km^{2}
Medstead No. 497	497	6	16	January 1, 1913	508	513	−1.0%	1,203.22	0.4/km^{2}
Meeting Lake No. 466	466	6	16	January 1, 1913	319	376	−15.2%	1,066.74	0.3/km^{2}
Meota No. 468	468	6	17	December 13, 1909	933	936	−0.3%	651.06	1.4/km^{2}
Mervin No. 499	499	6	17	January 1, 1913	1,256	1,224	+2.6%	1,594.6	0.8/km^{2}
Milden No. 286	286	5	12	December 12, 1910	327	283	+15.5%	735.29	0.4/km^{2}
Milton No. 292	292	6	13	December 11, 1911	241	312	−22.8%	658.64	0.4/km^{2}
Miry Creek No. 229	229	3	8	January 1, 1913	370	384	−3.6%	1,221.15	0.3/km^{2}
Monet No. 257	257	3	8	December 13, 1909	445	495	−10.1%	1,591.7	0.3/km^{2}
Montmartre No. 126	126	1	6	December 13, 1909	483	488	−1.0%	853.84	0.6/km^{2}
Montrose No. 315	315	5	12	December 13, 1909	712	712	0.0%	898.38	0.8/km^{2}
Moose Creek No. 33	33	1	1	December 12, 1910	379	372	+1.9%	842.03	0.5/km^{2}
Moose Jaw No. 161	161	2	7	December 11, 1911	1,163	1,147	+1.4%	793.73	1.5/km^{2}
Moose Mountain No. 63	63	1	1	December 11, 1911	492	475	+3.6%	738.38	0.7/km^{2}
Moose Range No. 486	486	4	14	December 11, 1916	1,000	1,131	−11.6%	2,418.7	0.4/km^{2}
Moosomin No. 121	121	1	5	January 1, 1913	470	504	−6.7%	562.01	0.8/km^{2}
Morris No. 312	312	5	11	December 13, 1909	290	316	−8.2%	847.16	0.3/km^{2}
Morse No. 165	165	3	7	December 11, 1911	427	401	+6.5%	1,244.38	0.3/km^{2}
Mount Hope No. 279	279	5	10	December 11, 1911	531	567	−6.3%	1,669.17	0.3/km^{2}
Mount Pleasant No. 2	2	1	1	December 11, 1911	414	383	+8.1%	780.83	0.5/km^{2}
Mountain View No. 318	318	6	12	December 13, 1909	337	333	+1.2%	840.03	0.4/km^{2}
Newcombe No. 260	260	3	8	December 11, 1911	342	400	−14.5%	1,075.6	0.3/km^{2}
Nipawin No. 487	487	4	14	December 9, 1912	1,004	1,030	−2.5%	886.04	1.1/km^{2}
North Battleford No. 437	437	6	16	December 12, 1910	725	733	−1.1%	797.2	0.9/km^{2}
North Qu'Appelle No. 187	187	1	6	December 12, 1910	855	728	+17.4%	494.98	1.7/km^{2}
Norton No. 69	69	2	2	December 13, 1909	233	259	−10.0%	844.8	0.3/km^{2}
Oakdale No. 320	320	6	13	December 13, 1909	253	258	−1.9%	805.92	0.3/km^{2}
Old Post No. 43	43	2	3	January 1, 1967	377	395	−4.6%	1,757	0.2/km^{2}
Orkney No. 244	244	4	9	January 1, 1913	1,875	1,860	+0.8%	806.99	2.3/km^{2}
Paddockwood No. 520	520	5	15	January 1, 1978	895	974	−8.1%	2,456.56	0.4/km^{2}
Parkdale No. 498	498	6	17	January 1, 1913	621	631	−1.6%	1,388.9	0.4/km^{2}
Paynton No. 470	470	6	17	January 1, 1913	255	268	−4.9%	593.95	0.4/km^{2}
Pense No. 160	160	2	6	January 1, 1913	508	471	+7.9%	841.48	0.6/km^{2}
Perdue No. 346	346	5	12	December 13, 1909	445	463	−3.9%	826.14	0.5/km^{2}
Piapot No. 110	110	3	4	December 8, 1913	302	324	−6.8%	1,912.81	0.2/km^{2}
Pinto Creek No. 75	75	3	3	January 1, 1913	283	239	+18.4%	845.49	0.3/km^{2}
Pittville No. 169	169	3	8	January 1, 1913	208	204	+2.0%	1,258.06	0.2/km^{2}
Pleasant Valley No. 288	288	6	12	December 11, 1911	302	345	−12.5%	830.53	0.4/km^{2}
Pleasantdale No. 398	398	4	14	December 11, 1911	596	611	−2.5%	757.91	0.8/km^{2}
Ponass Lake No. 367	367	4	14	January 1, 1913	422	502	−15.9%	750.62	0.6/km^{2}
Poplar Valley No. 12	12	2	3	January 1, 1913	195	200	−2.5%	769.37	0.3/km^{2}
Porcupine No. 395	395	4	14	February 28, 1944	803	820	−2.1%	2,339.96	0.3/km^{2}
Prairie Rose No. 309	309	5	10	December 12, 1910	220	259	−15.1%	839.08	0.3/km^{2}
Prairiedale No. 321	321	6	13	December 13, 1909	247	253	−2.4%	546.74	0.5/km^{2}
Preeceville No. 334	334	4	9	January 1, 1913	919	859	+7.0%	1,394.5	0.7/km^{2}
Prince Albert No. 461	461	5	15	December 9, 1912	3,562	3,601	−1.1%	1,017.44	3.5/km^{2}
Progress No. 351	351	6	13	December 12, 1910	268	260	+3.1%	802.06	0.3/km^{2}
Reciprocity No. 32	32	1	1	December 11, 1911	344	386	−10.9%	733.04	0.5/km^{2}
Redberry No. 435	435	5	16	January 1, 1913	342	372	−8.1%	1,015.2	0.3/km^{2}
Redburn No. 130	130	2	6	January 1, 1913	250	250	0.0%	847.95	0.3/km^{2}
Reford No. 379	379	6	13	December 12, 1910	257	235	+9.4%	707.06	0.4/km^{2}
Reno No. 51	51	3	4	December 11, 1911	379	399	−5.0%	3,461.61	0.1/km^{2}
Riverside No. 168	168	3	8	January 1, 1913	477	490	−2.7%	1,298.39	0.4/km^{2}
Rocanville No. 151	151	1	5	December 9, 1912	507	533	−4.9%	758.48	0.7/km^{2}
Rodgers No. 133	133	2	7	December 9, 1912	90	101	−10.9%	719.8	0.1/km^{2}
Rosedale No. 283	283	5	11	December 13, 1909	526	515	+2.1%	921.51	0.6/km^{2}
Rosemount No. 378	378	6	12	December 12, 1910	201	198	+1.5%	571.35	0.4/km^{2}
Rosthern No. 403	403	5	15	December 9, 1912	2,300	2,015	+14.1%	954.22	2.4/km^{2}
Round Hill No. 467	467	6	16	December 11, 1911	361	446	−19.1%	816.12	0.4/km^{2}
Round Valley No. 410	410	6	13	December 13, 1909	423	361	+17.2%	810.57	0.5/km^{2}
Rudy No. 284	284	5	11	December 13, 1909	466	471	−1.1%	813.86	0.6/km^{2}
Saltcoats No. 213	213	1	5	December 9, 1912	712	673	+5.8%	830.58	0.9/km^{2}
Sarnia No. 221	221	2	6	December 13, 1909	322	266	+21.1%	870.73	0.4/km^{2}
Saskatchewan Landing No. 167	167	3	8	January 1, 1913	415	462	−10.2%	797.52	0.5/km^{2}
Sasman No. 336	336	4	10	January 1, 1913	765	818	−6.5%	1,006.49	0.8/km^{2}
Scott No. 98	98	2	2	December 13, 1909	195	176	+10.8%	850.08	0.2/km^{2}
Senlac No. 411	411	6	13	January 1, 1913	216	195	+10.8%	1,026.75	0.2/km^{2}
Shamrock No. 134	134	2	7	December 9, 1912	205	227	−9.7%	757.52	0.3/km^{2}
Shellbrook No. 493	493	5	16	January 1, 1913	1,587	1,533	+3.5%	1,235.75	1.3/km^{2}
Sherwood No. 159	159	2	6	December 11, 1911	974	879	+10.8%	656.87	1.5/km^{2}
Silverwood No. 123	123	1	5	October 31, 1911	410	466	−12.0%	844.61	0.5/km^{2}
Sliding Hills No. 273	273	4	9	January 1, 1913	421	520	−19.0%	855.28	0.5/km^{2}
Snipe Lake No. 259	259	3	8	December 11, 1911	396	452	−12.4%	1,573.8	0.3/km^{2}
Souris Valley No. 7	7	1	2	December 13, 1909	249	240	+3.8%	817.52	0.3/km^{2}
South Qu'Appelle No. 157	157	1	6	August 6, 1884	1,275	1,271	+0.3%	889.72	1.4/km^{2}
Spalding No. 368	368	4	14	December 11, 1911	453	447	+1.3%	811.47	0.6/km^{2}
Spiritwood No. 496	496	6	16	December 9, 1929	1,347	1,349	−0.1%	2,392.86	0.6/km^{2}
Spy Hill No. 152	152	1	5	December 11, 1911	323	366	−11.7%	679.33	0.5/km^{2}
St. Andrews No. 287	287	6	12	December 12, 1910	522	532	−1.9%	803.75	0.6/km^{2}
St. Louis No. 431	431	5	15	January 1, 1913	1,086	969	+12.1%	790.93	1.4/km^{2}
St. Peter No. 369	369	5	15	December 11, 1911	773	790	−2.2%	823.21	0.9/km^{2}
St. Philips No. 301	301	4	9	January 1, 1913	220	235	−6.4%	655.78	0.3/km^{2}
Stanley No. 215	215	1	5	January 1, 1913	505	516	−2.1%	855.4	0.6/km^{2}
Star City No. 428	428	4	14	January 1, 1913	918	911	+0.8%	824.85	1.1/km^{2}
Stonehenge No. 73	73	2	3	December 11, 1911	319	403	−20.8%	985.74	0.3/km^{2}
Storthoaks No. 31	31	1	1	December 11, 1911	292	304	−3.9%	584.16	0.5/km^{2}
Surprise Valley No. 9	9	2	2	January 1, 1913	217	251	−13.5%	813.93	0.3/km^{2}
Sutton No. 103	103	2	3	December 11, 1911	240	240	0.0%	822.4	0.3/km^{2}
Swift Current No. 137	137	3	8	December 12, 1910	1,932	1,981	−2.5%	1,102.43	1.8/km^{2}
Tecumseh No. 65	65	1	1	December 13, 1909	271	270	+0.4%	824.5	0.3/km^{2}
Terrell No. 101	101	2	3	January 1, 1913	241	224	+7.6%	864.06	0.3/km^{2}
The Gap No. 39	39	2	2	December 12, 1903	199	230	−13.5%	830.92	0.2/km^{2}
Three Lakes No. 400	400	5	15	January 1, 1913	598	620	−3.5%	772.49	0.8/km^{2}
Tisdale No. 427	427	4	14	December 9, 1912	911	916	−0.5%	847.39	1.1/km^{2}
Torch River No. 488	488	4	14	January 1, 1950	1,471	1,468	+0.2%	5,178.9	0.3/km^{2}
Touchwood No. 248	248	4	10	December 12, 1910	343	267	+28.5%	706.72	0.5/km^{2}
Tramping Lake No. 380	380	6	13	December 12, 1910	375	410	−8.5%	615.56	0.6/km^{2}
Tullymet No. 216	216	1	6	January 1, 1913	200	220	−9.1%	562.99	0.4/km^{2}
Turtle River No. 469	469	6	17	December 9, 1912	344	360	−4.4%	664.44	0.5/km^{2}
Usborne No. 310	310	5	11	December 13, 1909	529	547	−3.3%	810.38	0.7/km^{2}
Val Marie No. 17	17	3	4	January 1, 1969	413	420	−1.7%	3,105.26	0.1/km^{2}
Vanscoy No. 345	345	5	12	December 13, 1909	2,840	2,714	+4.6%	865.49	3.3/km^{2}
Victory No. 226	226	3	7	December 8, 1919	380	443	−14.2%	1,375.44	0.3/km^{2}
Viscount No. 341	341	5	11	December 13, 1909	338	371	−8.9%	831.23	0.4/km^{2}
Wallace No. 243	243	4	9	December 11, 1911	852	879	−3.1%	830.24	1.0/km^{2}
Walpole No. 92	92	1	1	December 12, 1910	326	338	−3.6%	844.66	0.4/km^{2}
Waverley No. 44	44	2	3	February 1, 1913	336	359	−6.4%	1,429.3	0.2/km^{2}
Wawken No. 93	93	1	1	January 1, 1913	571	559	+2.1%	766.57	0.7/km^{2}
Webb No. 138	138	3	8	December 13, 1909	541	533	+1.5%	1,098.78	0.5/km^{2}
Wellington No. 97	97	1	2	December 13, 1909	371	356	+4.2%	838.68	0.4/km^{2}
Weyburn No. 67	67	1	2	December 13, 1909	1,064	1,048	+1.5%	808.33	1.3/km^{2}
Wheatlands No. 163	163	2	7	December 13, 1909	149	149	0.0%	827.4	0.2/km^{2}
Whiska Creek No. 106	106	3	3	January 1, 1913	465	499	−6.8%	851.89	0.5/km^{2}
White Valley No. 49	49	3	4	January 1, 1913	478	478	0.0%	2,026.88	0.2/km^{2}
Willner No. 253	253	5	11	January 1, 1913	255	245	+4.1%	835.03	0.3/km^{2}
Willow Bunch No. 42	42	2	3	November 21, 1912	306	361	−15.2%	1,047.77	0.3/km^{2}
Willow Creek No. 458	458	4	14	December 9, 1912	630	693	−9.1%	845.18	0.7/km^{2}
Willowdale No. 153	153	1	5	January 1, 1913	299	297	+0.7%	604.13	0.5/km^{2}
Wilton No. 472	472	6	17	December 13, 1909	1,629	1,494	+9.0%	1,041.27	1.6/km^{2}
Winslow No. 319	319	6	13	December 13, 1909	344	324	+6.2%	798.07	0.4/km^{2}
Wise Creek No. 77	77	3	4	January 1, 1913	205	157	+30.6%	845.81	0.2/km^{2}
Wolseley No. 155	155	1	5	December 13, 1909	372	405	−8.1%	774.26	0.5/km^{2}
Wolverine No. 340	340	5	11	December 13, 1909	480	464	+3.4%	834.78	0.6/km^{2}
Wood Creek No. 281	281	5	11	December 13, 1909	224	205	+9.3%	832.34	0.3/km^{2}
Wood River No. 74	74	2	3	December 9, 1912	433	324	+33.6%	838.45	0.5/km^{2}
Wreford No. 280	280	5	11	December 12, 1910	135	150	−10.0%	798.55	0.2/km^{2}
Total rural municipalities	—	—	—	—	176,535	174,601	+1.1%	307,649.16	0.6/km^{2}

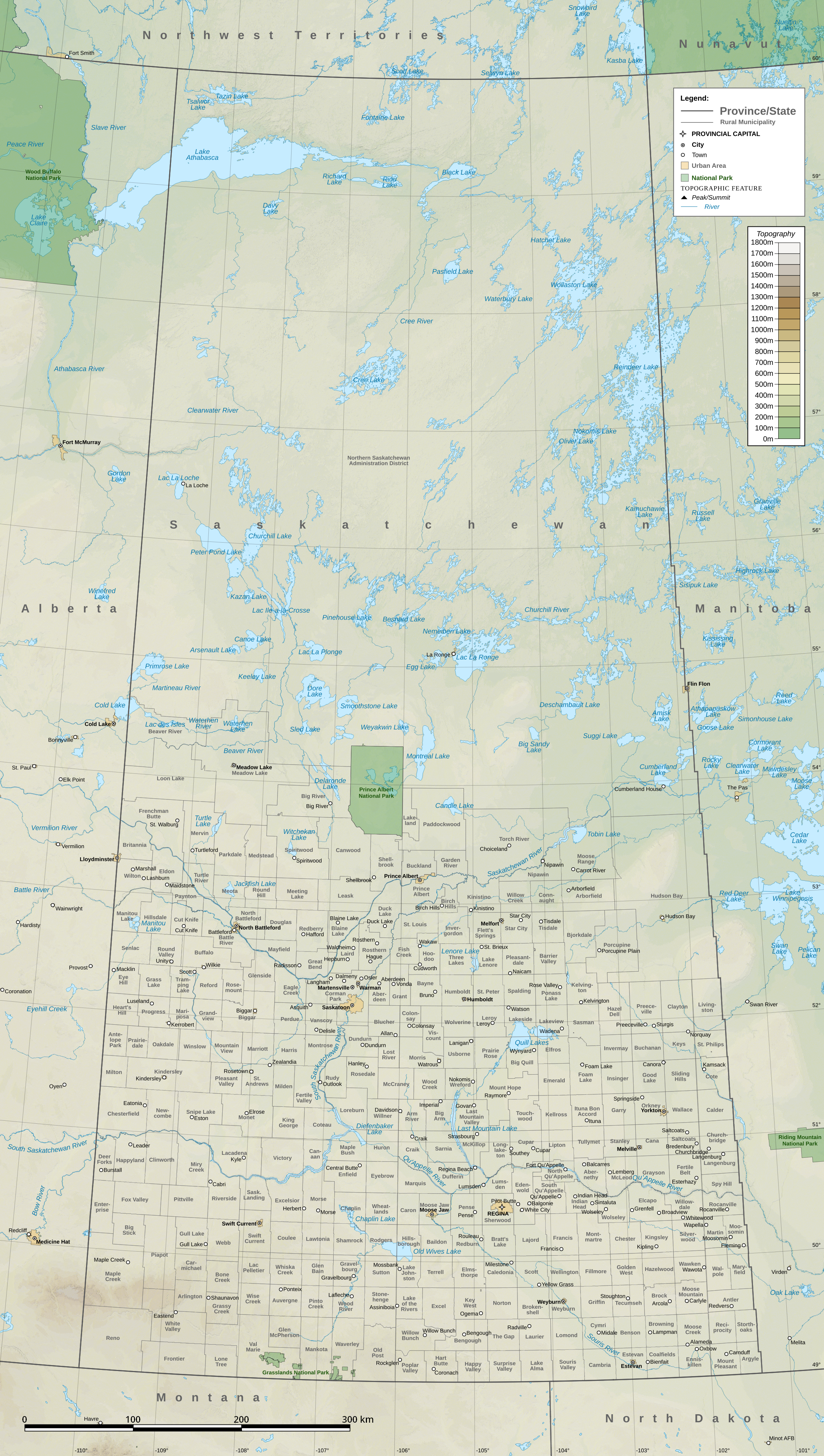
A topographic map of Saskatchewan, showing rural municipalities, select urban municipalities, and natural features

== Former rural municipalities ==
Rural municipality (RM)	RM No.	Disorganization date
Beaver No. 276	276	December 31, 1952
Bitter Lake No. 142	142	January 1, 1951
Bushville No. 348	348	December 31, 1950
Devil's Lake No. 274	274	November 29, 1909
Elma No. 291	291	June 1, 1951
Enterprise No. 172	172	January 1, 1951
Fairview No. 258	258	December 31, 1965
Foam Lake No. 306	306	December 31, 1952
Greenfield No. 529	529	June 1, 1990
Hillsburgh No. 289	289	December 31, 1965
Kutawa No. 278	278	January 1, 2004
Mantario No. 262	262	December 31, 1968
Millington No. 249	249	December 31, 1951
North Star No. 531	531	December 31, 1953
Paradise Hill No. 501	501	December 31, 1953
Park No. 375	375	December 31, 1969
Prairie No. 408	408	January 1, 1999
Royal No. 465	465	September 1, 1950
Shell Lake No. 495	495	December 31, 1953
Vermillion Hills No. 195	195	December 31, 1967
Warman No. 374	374	December 31, 1969

== See also ==
- List of communities in Saskatchewan
- List of municipal districts in Alberta
- List of municipalities in Saskatchewan
- List of rural municipalities in Manitoba
- Rural municipality (Canada)
