= List of mayors of Moose Jaw =

This is a list of mayors of Moose Jaw, Saskatchewan.

From 1920 to 1925, Moose Jaw mayors were elected using Instant-runoff voting. All other times First past the post was used.

Dates	Mayor
1903	Charles Unwin
1904	W.C. Sanders
1905	C.H. Holdsworth
1906	Donald McLean
1907-08	J.H. Bunnell
1909	J.E. Hopkins
1910	Edward C. Matthews
1911	J.M. Paul
1912	Alfred Maybery
1913-15	James Pascoe
1916-18	W.W. Davidson
1919-20	S.A. Hamilton
1921	R.H. Smith
1922-23	W.F. Dunn
1924-27	W.W. Davidson
1928	W.F. Dunn
1929-31	James Pascoe
1932-34	J.W. Hawthorne
1935-37	H.S. Johnstone
1938-39	W.P. Johnson
1940-44	John Wesley Corman
1945-48	J. Fraser McClellan
1949	Robert West
1950-56	Louis H. Lewry
1957-58	Joseph Hampson
1959-64	Os. B. Fysh
1965-70	Louis H. Lewry
1971-72	J. Ernest Pascoe
1973-82	Herb E. Taylor
1983-88	Louis H. Lewry
1989-91	Stan Montgomery
1991-94	Don Mitchell
1994-2000	Ray Boughen
2000-2006	Al Schwinghamer
2006-2009	Dale McBain
2009-2012	Glenn Hagel
2012-2016	Deb Higgins
2016-2021	Fraser Tolmie
2021–2024	Clive Tolley
2024-present	James Murdock
