= William Beynon (disambiguation) =

William Beynon (1888–1958) was a Canadian Tsimshian Nation chief and oral historian.

William Beynon may also refer to:

- Sir William Beynon (Indian Army officer) (1866–1955), British Indian Army general
- William Addison Beynon (1877–1968), Canadian politician and barrister
- Sir Granville Beynon (William John Granville Beynon, 1914–1996), British physicist

== See also ==
- William Benyon (disambiguation)
