= Sceptre, Saskatchewan =

Village in Saskatchewan, Canada

Sceptre
- Special service area
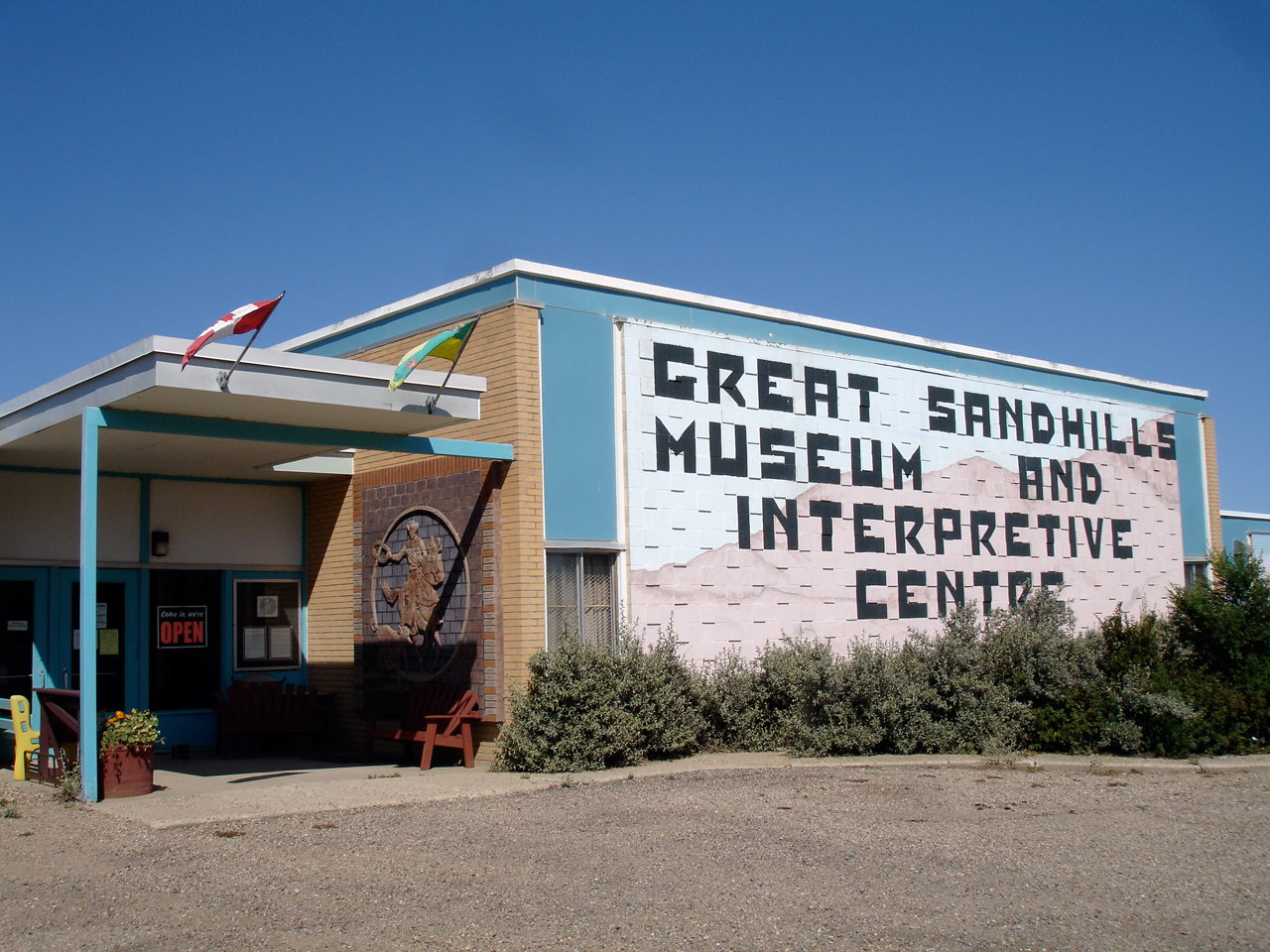
- Great Sandhills Museum

- Location of Sceptre in Saskatchewan Sceptre (Canada)
- Coordinates: 50.9°N 109.26°W
- Country: Canada
- Province: Saskatchewan
- Region: Southwest
- Census division: No. 8
- Rural municipality: Clinworth No. 230
- Incorporated (village): 30 April 1913
- Dissolved: 1 January 2023

Government
  - Administrator: Sherry Egeland

Area
  - Land: 1.33 km^{2} (0.51 sq mi)

Population (2021)
  - Total: 78
- Time zone: CST
- Postal code: S0N 2H0
- Area code: 306

Sceptre (2021 population: 78) is a special service area in the Canadian province of Saskatchewan within the Rural Municipality of Clinworth No. 230 and Census Division No. 8. It held village status between 1913 and 2022.

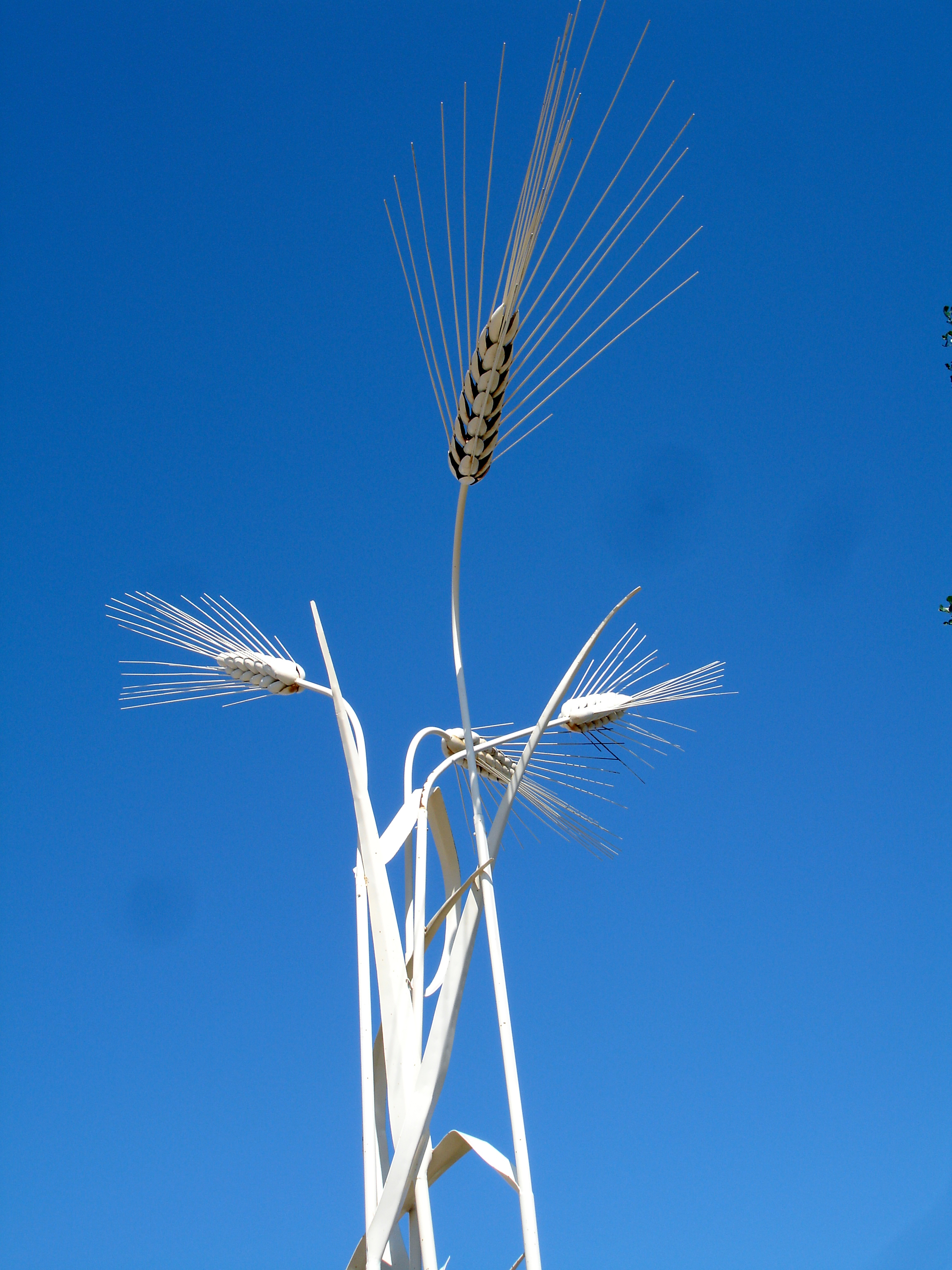
Metal wheat sculpture

== History ==
Sceptre incorporated as a village on 30 April 1913. It restructured on 1 January 2023, relinquishing its village status in favour of becoming a special service area under the jurisdiction of the Rural Municipality of Clinworth No. 230.

== Demographics ==
Population history (1981–2021)
| Year | Pop. | ±% |
|---|---|---|
| 1981 | 169 | — |
| 1986 | 193 | +14.2% |
| 1991 | 168 | −13.0% |
| 1996 | 154 | −8.3% |
| 2001 | 136 | −11.7% |
| 2006 | 99 | −27.2% |
| 2011 | 97 | −2.0% |
| 2016 | 94 | −3.1% |
| 2021 | 78 | −17.0% |
Source: Statistics Canada via Saskatchewan Bureau of Statistics

In the 2021 Census of Population conducted by Statistics Canada, Sceptre had a population of 78 living in 40 of its 46 total private dwellings, a change of −17% from its 2016 population of 94. With a land area of 1.33 km^{2} (0.51 sq mi), it had a population density of 58.6/km^{2} (151.9/sq mi) in 2021.

In the 2016 Census of Population, Sceptre had a population of 94 living in 46 of its 54 total private dwellings, a −3.2% change from its 2011 population of 97. With a land area of 1.23 km^{2} (0.47 sq mi), it had a population density of 76.4/km^{2} (197.9/sq mi) in 2016.

== Arts and culture ==
Sceptre is home to various works of public art, including cartoon-like fire hydrants, murals, and the world's largest metal wheat sculpture. The latter was created in 1990 and stands 33 feet (10 m) tall.

The former school was reopened in 1988 as the Great Sandhills Museum, with exhibits showcasing the area's natural and human history.

== Attractions ==
Sceptre is north of the Great Sand Hills, a vast area of arid grassland and sand dunes. One of the more accessible parts of the dunes is approximately 10 kilometres (6.2 mi) south of the community. Though located on private land, the public is permitted to enter the area.

== Notable people ==
- Bert Olmstead (1926–2015), ice hockey left winger and five-time Stanley Cup winner
- Jimmy Shields (1909–1996), curler and racehorse owner
- Harry Whiteside (1909–1984), former member of Parliament for Swift Current

== See also ==
- List of communities in Saskatchewan
