= Bill Gottselig =

Canadian politician

William Gottselig

MP for Moose Jaw
- In office 5 November 1984 – 1 October 1988
- Preceded by: Douglas Neil
- Succeeded by: riding dissolved

Personal details
- Born: 1 December 1934 Balgonie, Saskatchewan, Canada
- Died: 4 January 2000 (aged 65)
- Party: Progressive Conservative
- Occupation: farmer, businessman

William Andrew Gottselig (1 December 1934 – 4 January 2000) was a Canadian businessman, farmer and politician. Gottselig served as a Progressive Conservative party member of the House of Commons of Canada. He was born in Balgonie, Saskatchewan.

He was first elected at the Moose Jaw riding 1984 federal election thus serving in the 33rd Canadian Parliament. In the 1988 federal election, he campaigned in the riding of Moose Jaw—Lake Centre, but lost to Rod Laporte of the New Democratic Party. He also unsuccessfully campaigned at this riding in the 1993 federal election, that time defeated by Allan Kerpan of the Reform Party.

In the early 1990s, he was appointed to the Farm Debt Review Board, a federal government agency.
