= Rural Municipality of Clinworth No. 230 =

Rural municipality in Saskatchewan, Canada

Clinworth No. 230
- Rural municipality
- Rural Municipality of Clinworth No. 230

- Location of the RM of Clinworth No. 230 in Saskatchewan
- Coordinates: 50.987°N 109.111°W
- Country: Canada
- Province: Saskatchewan
- Census division: 8
- SARM division: 3
- Formed: December 9, 1912

Government
  - Reeve: Tyler Trew
  - Governing body: RM of Clinworth No. 230 Council
  - Administrator: Sherry Egeland
  - Office location: Sceptre

Area (2016)
  - Land: 1,432.75 km^{2} (553.19 sq mi)

Population (2016)
  - Total: 154
  - Density: 0.1/km^{2} (0.26/sq mi)
- Time zone: CST
  - Summer (DST): CST
- Area codes: 306 and 639

The Rural Municipality of Clinworth No. 230 (2016 population: 154) is a rural municipality (RM) in the Canadian province of Saskatchewan within Census Division No. 8 and SARM Division No. 3.

== History ==
The RM of Clinworth No. 230 incorporated as a rural municipality on December 9, 1912.

== Geography ==
=== Communities and localities ===
The following urban municipalities are surrounded by the RM.

- Sceptre, dissolved as a village as of January 1, 2023.
- Lemsford, dissolved as a village, January 1, 1951
- Portreeve, dissolved as a village, December 31, 1972

== Demographics ==
Population history (1981–2016)
Year	Pop.	±%
1981	444	—
1986	394	−11.3%
1991	347	−11.9%
1996	331	−4.6%
2001	272	−17.8%
2006	228	−16.2%
2011	211	−7.5%
2016	154	−27.0%
Source: Statistics Canada via Saskatchewan Bureau of Statistics

In the 2021 Census of Population conducted by Statistics Canada, the RM of Clinworth No. 230 had a population of 168 living in 76 of its 85 total private dwellings, a change of 9.1% from its 2016 population of 154. With a land area of 1,436.33 km^{2} (554.57 sq mi), it had a population density of 0.1/km^{2} (0.3/sq mi) in 2021.

In the 2016 Census of Population, the RM of Clinworth No. 230 recorded a population of 154 living in 70 of its 77 total private dwellings, a −27% change from its 2011 population of 211. With a land area of 1,432.75 km^{2} (553.19 sq mi), it had a population density of 0.1/km^{2} (0.3/sq mi) in 2016.

== Attractions ==
- Lemsford Ferry Regional Park
- Lemsford Ferry
- Great Sandhills Ecological Reserve
- Great Sand Hills Museum - Sceptre
- Lancer Centennial Museum

== Government ==
The RM of Clinworth No. 230 is governed by an elected municipal council and an appointed administrator that meets on the second Thursday of every month. The reeve of the RM is Krista Loudon while its administrator is Sherry Egeland. The RM's office is located in Sceptre.

== Transportation ==
- Saskatchewan Highway 32
- Saskatchewan Highway 649
- Canadian Pacific Railway
- Lemsford Ferry

== Notable people ==
- Harry Whiteside

== See also ==
- List of rural municipalities in Saskatchewan
