= David Anderson (Saskatchewan politician) =

Canadian politician (born 1957)

David L. Anderson
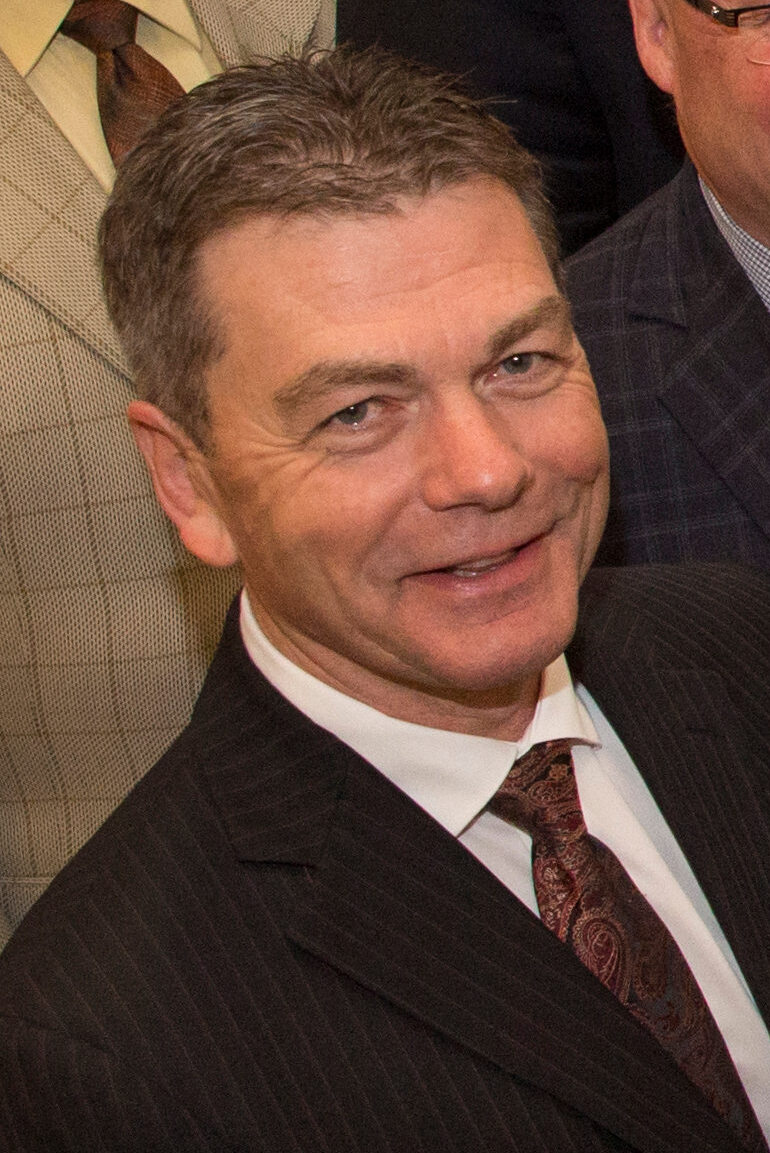

Official Opposition Critic for Agriculture

Member of Parliament for Cypress Hills—Grasslands
- In office September 15, 2016 – August 29, 2017
- Leader: Rona Ambrose; Andrew Scheer
- Preceded by: Chris Warkentin
- Succeeded by: Luc Berthold
- In office November 27, 2000 – September 11, 2019
- Preceded by: Lee Morrison
- Succeeded by: Jeremy Patzer

Personal details
- Born: August 15, 1957 (age 69) Frontier, Saskatchewan, Canada
- Party: Conservative (2003‍–‍present); Canadian Alliance (2000‍–‍2003)
- Spouse: Sheila Anderson (m. 1982)
- Children: 2
- Profession: Businessman; farmer
- Cabinet: Parliamentary Secretary to the Minister of Foreign Affairs

David L. Anderson (born August 15, 1957) is a former Conservative member of the House of Commons of Canada representing Cypress Hills—Grasslands, a position he has held from 2000 until 2019. He was a member of the Canadian Alliance from 2000 to 2003. He is a businessman, and a farmer. He has received broad based support being re-elected in 2004, 2006, 2008 and 2011 with significant margins.

Anderson served as the Parliamentary Secretary to the Minister of Foreign Affairs in the Government of Canada of former Prime Minister of Canada Stephen Harper and, after being reelected in the Parliamentary riding of Cypress Hills-Grasslands in the 42nd Parliament of Canada, served as the Opposition Critic for Human Rights and Religious Freedom in the Official Opposition led by interim Leader of Her Majesty's Loyal Opposition in the House of Commons of Canada of the Parliament of Canada.

Anderson is a founding and steering committee member of the International Panel of Parliamentarians for Freedom of Religion or Belief. On March 4, 2019 Anderson announced that he will not be seeking reelection in his Cypress Hills-Grasslands riding in the 2019 Federal election. After the 2019 General Election Anderson's nephew, Jeremy Patzer was chosen as the Member of Parliament for Cypress Hills-Grasslands.

== Early years ==
Anderson was born in Frontier, Saskatchewan and graduated from Frontier High School in 1975. Anderson earned a Bachelor of Arts in Political Science at the University of Regina, and then earned a Masters of Divinity at the Canadian Theological Seminary in 1990.

== Personal life ==
Anderson married his wife Sheila in 1982. They have two adult children. Anderson is a businessman and farmer, and has been farming for over 30 years.

== Municipal politics ==
Anderson served on the Eastend School Division Board from 1994 to 2000, he was a School Board Trustee from 1994 to 1997 and Chair from 1997 to 2000.

== Federal politics ==
Anderson entered federal politics in 2000 and represented the federal riding of Cypress Hills-Grassland until 2019.

=== 37th Parliament ===
On November 27, 2000, Anderson was elected as a Canadian Alliance Member of Parliament for the federal riding of Cypress Hills—Grasslands. Anderson won the seat with 18,593 votes – 61.6%, defeating Liberal candidate Marlin Bryce Belt, NDP candidate Keith Murch and Progressive Conservative William Caton.

Anderson was a member of the Standing Committee on Agriculture and Agri-Food and its Subcommittee on Agenda and Procedure.

As a member of the Official Opposition, Anderson served as Critic of the Canadian Wheat Board and Associate Critic of Agriculture.

From 2006 to 2010, Anderson served as Chairman of the National Prayer Breakfast in Ottawa. He has been committed to raising awareness of the need to protect religious freedom around the world, hosting annual Parliamentary Forums on Religious Freedom. In addition, Anderson worked with fellow MP Bev Shipley to present and pass Motion 382, which unanimously declared the Parliament of Canada's support for religious freedom around the world.

=== 38th Parliament ===
On June 28, 2004, Anderson was re-elected as Conservative Member of Parliament for the federal riding of Cypress Hills-Grasslands. He won the seat with 18,010 votes – 60.63%, defeating Liberal candidate Bill Caton, NDP candidate Jeff Potts and Green Party candidate Bev Currie.

Anderson was a member of the Standing Committee on Agriculture and Agri-Food.

Anderson introduced Private Member's Bill, Bill C-285 – An Act to amend the Income Tax Act (exclusion of income received by an athlete from a non-profit club, society or association). Bill C-285 did not come into force, the last stage completed was second reading and referral to committee in the House of Commons.

As a member of the Official Opposition, Anderson served as Critic of the Canadian Wheat Board.

=== 39th Parliament ===
On January 23, 2006, Anderson was re-elected as Conservative Member of Parliament for the federal riding of Cypress Hills-Grasslands. He won the seat with 20,035 votes – 66.47%, defeating Liberal candidate Bill Caton, NDP candidate Mike Eason and Green Party candidate Amanda Knorr.

Anderson was a member of the Standing Committee on Agriculture and Agri-Food, and the Standing Committee on Natural Resources.

During the 39th Parliament, Anderson was appointed Parliamentary Secretary to the Minister of Natural Resources, Parliamentary Secretary (for the Canadian Wheat Board) to the Minister of Agriculture and Agri-Food and Minister for the Canadian Wheat Board.

=== 40th Parliament ===
On October 14, 2008, Anderson was re-elected as Conservative Member of Parliament for the federal riding of Cypress Hills-Grasslands. He won the seat with 17,922 votes – 64.35%, defeating Liberal candidate Duane Filson, NDP candidate Scott Wilson and Green Party candidate Bill Clary.

Anderson served as a member of Standing of Natural Resources and the Subcommittee on Food Safety of the Stranding Committee on Agriculture and Agri-Food.

Anderson was appointed Parliament Secretary to the Minister of Natural Resources and for the Canadian Wheat Board.

=== 41st Parliament ===
On May 2, 2011, Anderson was re-elected as Conservative Member of Parliament for the federal riding of Cypress Hills-Grasslands. He won the seat with 20,555 votes – 69.8%, defeating Liberal candidate Duane Filson, NDP candidate Trevor Peterson and Green Party candidate Helmi Scott.

Anderson has served as a member of the Legislative Committee on Bill C-18, the Subcommittee on Bill C-38 of the Standing Committee on Finance, the Standing Committee on Natural Resources, the Standing Committee on Foreign Affairs and International Development and its Subcommittee on Agenda and Procedure.

Anderson served as Parliamentary Secretary to the Minister of Natural Resources and for the Canadian Wheat Board until September 19, 2013, when he was appointed Parliamentary Secretary to the Minister of Foreign Affairs.

=== 42nd Parliament ===
On October 19, 2015, Anderson was re-elected as Conservative Member of Parliament for the federal riding of Cypress Hills-Grassland. He won the election with 25, 051 votes- 69.2%, defeating Liberal candidate Marvin Wiens, NDP candidate Trevor Peterson, and Green Party candidate William Caton.

On November 20, 2015, Anderson was named the Opposition Critic for International Human Rights and Religious Freedom in the Official Opposition Shadow Cabinet.

Anderson did not run for re-election in the 2019 federal election.

== Canadian Wheat Board comment controversy ==
In October 2011, Anderson mocked Canadian Wheat Board officials on his official Conservative party website by posting a video that national leader of Canadian Inuit Mary Simon immediately denounced for the repeated use of a racial slur. In the video, an animated character uses a pejorative term, Eskimo, which is considered derogatory towards aboriginal peoples in Canada, to suggest that the Canadian Wheat Board officials and the Inuit sound foreign and make no sense.

== Electoral record ==
2011 Canadian federal election: Cypress Hills—Grasslands
Party	Candidate	Votes	%	±%	Expenditures
Conservative	David L. Anderson	20,555	69.8	+5.4	$39,752
New Democratic	Trevor Peterson	6,248	21.2	+5.4	$9,855
Liberal	Duane Filson	1,838	6.2	-7.1	$27,813
Green	Helmi Scott	788	2.7	-3.9	$517
Total valid votes/expense limit		29,429	100.0		$94,253
Total rejected ballots		79	0.3	0.0	
Turnout		29,508	67.1	+4	
Eligible voters		43,997	–	–	
Conservative hold		Swing		+6.25	

2008 Canadian federal election: Cypress Hills—Grasslands
Party	Candidate	Votes	%	±%	Expenditures
Conservative	David L. Anderson	17,922	64.4	-2.1	$51,570
New Democratic	Scott Wilson	4,394	15.8	-1.1	$5,879
Liberal	Duane Filson	3,691	13.3	+0.4	$23,849
Green	Bill Clary	1,840	6.6	+2.8	$4,012
Total valid votes/expense limit		27,847	100.0		$91,352
Total rejected ballots		81	0.3	0.0	
Turnout		27,928	63	-3	
Conservative hold		Swing		+1.0	

2006 Canadian federal election: Cypress Hills—Grasslands
Party	Candidate	Votes	%	±%	Expenditures
Conservative	David L. Anderson	20,035	66.5	+5.8	$42,285
New Democratic	Mike Eason	5,076	16.8	+0.3	$12,076
Liberal	Bill Caton	3,885	12.9	-5.8	$3,553
Green	Amanda Knorr	1,141	3.8	-0.4	–
Total valid votes		30,137	100.0		–
Total rejected ballots		85	0.3	-0.1	
Turnout		30,222	66.5	+3	
Conservative hold		Swing		+5.8	

2004 Canadian federal election: Cypress Hills—Grasslands
Party	Candidate	Votes	%	±%	Expenditures
Conservative	David L. Anderson	18,010	60.6	-9.9	$35,176
Liberal	Bill Caton	5,547	18.7	+6.1	$29,831
New Democratic	Jeff Potts	4,901	16.5	–0.4	$17,512
Green	Bev Currie	1,243	4.2		$805
Total valid votes		29,701	100		–
Total rejected ballots		117	0.4	+0.1	
Turnout		29,818	63	-2	
Conservative hold		Swing		-8.0	

2000 Canadian federal election: Cypress Hills—Grasslands
Party	Candidate	Votes	%	±%	Expenditures
Alliance	David L. Anderson	18,593	61.6	+12.5	$33,948
New Democratic	Keith Murch	5,101	16.9	-2.5	$14,293
Liberal	Marlin Bryce Belt	3,791	12.6	-8.7	$722
Progressive Conservative	Bill Caton	2,676	8.9	-1.3	$7,462
Total valid votes		30,161	100		–
Total rejected ballots		90	0.3	0.0	
Turnout		30,251	65	-2.4	
Alliance hold		Swing		+10.6	
