= Moose Jaw (federal electoral district) =

Former federal electoral district in Saskatchewan, Canada

Moose Jaw was a federal electoral district in Saskatchewan, Canada, that was represented in the House of Commons of Canada from 1908 to 1953 and from 1968 to 1988. This riding was created in 1907 from parts of Assiniboia West and Calgary ridings. It was abolished in 1952 when it was redistributed into Assiniboia, Moose Jaw—Lake Centre and Rosetown—Biggar ridings.

It was re-created in 1966 from parts of Assiniboia, Moose Jaw—Lake Centre, Rosetown—Biggar, Rosthern, Saskatoon, and Swift Current ridings. The electoral district was abolished in 1987 when it was redistributed into Moose Jaw—Lake Centre and Regina—Lumsden ridings.

== Historical boundaries ==
1905 representation order

1914 representation order

1924 representation order

1933 representation order

1947 representation order

1952 representation order (as Moose Jaw—Lake Centre)

1966 representation order

1976 representation order

== Members of Parliament ==
This riding elected the following members of Parliament:

Parliament	Years	Member	Party
Moose Jaw; Riding established from Assiniboia West and Calgary
11th	1908–1911	William Erskine Knowles	Liberal
12th	1911–1917	William Erskine Knowles	Liberal
13th	1917–1921	James Alexander Calder	Government (Unionist)
14th	1921–1923	Robert Milton Johnson	Progressive
14th	1923–1925	Edward Nicholas Hopkins	Progressive
15th	1925–1926	John Gordon Ross	Liberal
16th	1926–1930	John Gordon Ross	Liberal
17th	1930–1935	William Addison Beynon	Conservative
18th	1935–1940	John Gordon Ross	Liberal
19th	1940–1945	John Gordon Ross	Liberal
20th	1945–1949	Wilbert Ross Thatcher	Co-operative Commonwealth
21st	1949–1953	Wilbert Ross Thatcher	Co-operative Commonwealth
Riding dissolved into Assiniboia, Moose Jaw—Lake Centre and Rosetown—Biggar
Riding re-established from Assiniboia, Moose Jaw—Lake Centre, Rosetown—Biggar, Rosthern, Saskatoon, and Swift Current
28th	1968–1972	John Skoberg	New Democratic
29th	1972–1974	Doug Neil	Progressive Conservative
30th	1974–1979	Doug Neil	Progressive Conservative
31st	1979–1980	Doug Neil	Progressive Conservative
32nd	1980–1984	Doug Neil	Progressive Conservative
33rd	1984–1988	Bill Gottselig	Progressive Conservative
Riding dissolved into Moose Jaw—Lake Centre and Regina—Lumsden

== Election results ==
1908 Canadian federal election
Party	Candidate	Votes
Liberal	KNOWLES, William Erskine	3,860
Conservative	WHEELER, Frank Howard	2,796

1911 Canadian federal election
Party	Candidate	Votes
Liberal	KNOWLES, William Erskine	8,285
Conservative	RATHWELL, Samuel K.	5,953

1917 Canadian federal election
Party	Candidate	Votes
Government (Unionist)	CALDER, Hon. James Alexander	8,866
Opposition-Labour	SOMERVILLE, James	2,946

1921 Canadian federal election
Party	Candidate	Votes
Progressive	JOHNSON, Robert Milton	6,744
Liberal	KNOWLES, William Erskine	5,815
Conservative	HAMILTON, Samuel Alexander	3,857

Johnson election overturned due to irregularities during the campaign

Due to Mr. Johnson's election being declared void and that declaration holding up on appeal on 22 February 1923, by-election held on April 10, 1923

By-election:

By-election on 10 April 1923
Party	Candidate	Votes
Progressive	HOPKINS, Edward Nicholas	8,960
Liberal	KNOWLES, William Erskine	7,362

1925 Canadian federal election
Party	Candidate	Votes
Liberal	ROSS, John Gordon	5,654
Conservative	WHITE, Wellington	5,356
Progressive	HOPKINS, Edward Nicholas	2,801

1926 Canadian federal election
Party	Candidate	Votes
Liberal	ROSS, John Gordon	8,487
Conservative	WHITE, Wellington	6,060
Progressive	JOHNSON, Robert Milton	1,798

1930 Canadian federal election
Party	Candidate	Votes
Conservative	BEYNON, William Addison	9,290
Liberal	ROSS, John Gordon	8,351

1935 Canadian federal election
Party	Candidate	Votes
Liberal	ROSS, John Gordon	7,353
Conservative	BEYNON, William Addison	4,553
Co-operative Commonwealth	STUART, Charles Anderson	2,272
Social Credit	JOHNSON, Robert Milton	2,235

1940 Canadian federal election
Party	Candidate	Votes
Liberal	ROSS, John Gordon	9,373
National Government	PATTERSON, Joseph Victor	7,807

1945 Canadian federal election
Party	Candidate	Votes
Co-operative Commonwealth	THATCHER, Wilbert Ross	9,831
Liberal	ROSS, John Gordon	5,862
Progressive Conservative	GILMOUR, Frederick James	4,358

1949 Canadian federal election
Party	Candidate	Votes
Co-operative Commonwealth	THATCHER, W. Ross	10,026
Liberal	PUDDEN, Edward Langdon	7,444
Progressive Conservative	SMILEY, Leila Elsie	3,334

1968 Canadian federal election
Party	Candidate	Votes
New Democratic	SKOBERG, John L.	11,982
Progressive Conservative	PASCOE, Ernest	10,496
Liberal	DUDDRIDGE, Lew C.	7,000

1972 Canadian federal election
Party	Candidate	Votes
Progressive Conservative	NEIL, Doug	11,967
New Democratic	SKOBERG, John L.	11,685
Liberal	KALLIO, Willard	5,767
Social Credit	GUILLAUME, Henry G.	526

1974 Canadian federal election
Party	Candidate	Votes
Progressive Conservative	NEIL, Doug	11,678
New Democratic	SKOBERG, John L.	10,113
Liberal	BRYAN, Alf	6,120
Social Credit	GUILLAUME, Henry	281

1979 Canadian federal election
Party	Candidate	Votes
Progressive Conservative	NEIL, Doug C.	16,031
New Democratic	HENLEY, David H.	11,122
Liberal	BROWN, Vern R.	5,583
Social Credit	GUILLAUME, Henry G.	313

1980 Canadian federal election
Party	Candidate	Votes
Progressive Conservative	NEIL, Doug	14,330
New Democratic	HENLEY, David H.	10,641
Liberal	BROWN, Vern R.	5,713
Independent	SENGER, Edward J.	124
Libertarian	QUENETT, Bob	64

1984 Canadian federal election
Party	Candidate	Votes
Progressive Conservative	GOTTSELIG, William Andrew	15,803
New Democratic	KINDRACHUK, Glenn	13,338
Liberal	HART, Larry	4,762
Confederation of Regions	BOECHLER, Brant	446

== See also ==
- List of Canadian electoral districts
- Historical federal electoral districts of Canada
