= Arthur John Lewis =

Canadian politician

Member of Parliament for Swift Current
- In office December 1921 – September 1925
- Preceded by: Ira Eugene Argue
- Succeeded by: Charles Edward Bothwell

Personal details
- Born: Arthur John Lewis; 12 March 1879 Isham, Northants, England
- Died: 8 November 1961 (aged 82) Penetanguishene, Ontario, Canada
- Party: Progressive
- Spouse: Eva M. Thomlinson
- Profession: Christian minister, manager, secretary

Arthur John Lewis (12 March 1879 – 8 November 1961) was a British-Canadian minister, administrator and politician. Lewis served as a Progressive party member of the House of Commons of Canada. He was born in Isham, Northants, England, the son of Arthur Lewis and Hannah S. Quincy, came to Canada in 1903 and became a Presbyterian minister, manager and secretary.

Lewis was educated at the University of Saskatchewan and Presbyterian College in Saskatoon. In 1908, he married Eva M. Thomlinson. He was elected to Parliament at the Swift Current riding in the 1921 general election. After completing one term in the House of Commons, Lewis was defeated in the 1925 federal election by Charles Edward Bothwell of the Liberals. Lewis was again unsuccessful at the riding during the 1926 federal election campaign. He made one more attempt to return to Parliament, this time as a Social Credit party candidate in the 1935 election at the Melfort riding but was again unsuccessful.
