= Charles Edward Bothwell =

Canadian politician

Member of the Canadian Parliament for Swift Current
- In office 1925–1940
- Preceded by: Arthur John Lewis
- Succeeded by: Roy Theodore Graham

Personal details
- Born: May 26, 1882 Owen Sound, Ontario, Canada
- Died: August 28, 1967 (aged 85) Swift Current, Saskatchewan, Canada
- Party: Liberal
- Occupation: Barrister

Charles Edward Bothwell (May 26, 1882 – August 28, 1967) was a Canadian politician and barrister.

Born in Owen Sound, Ontario, Bothwell was elected to the House of Commons of Canada as a Member of the Liberal Party in 1925 to represent the riding of Swift Current. He was re-elected in 1926, 1930 and 1935. During the 18th Parliament, he was Chairman of the House of Commons Special Committee on Elections and Franchise Acts.
