= Great Sand Hills =

Sand dunes in Saskatchewan, Canada

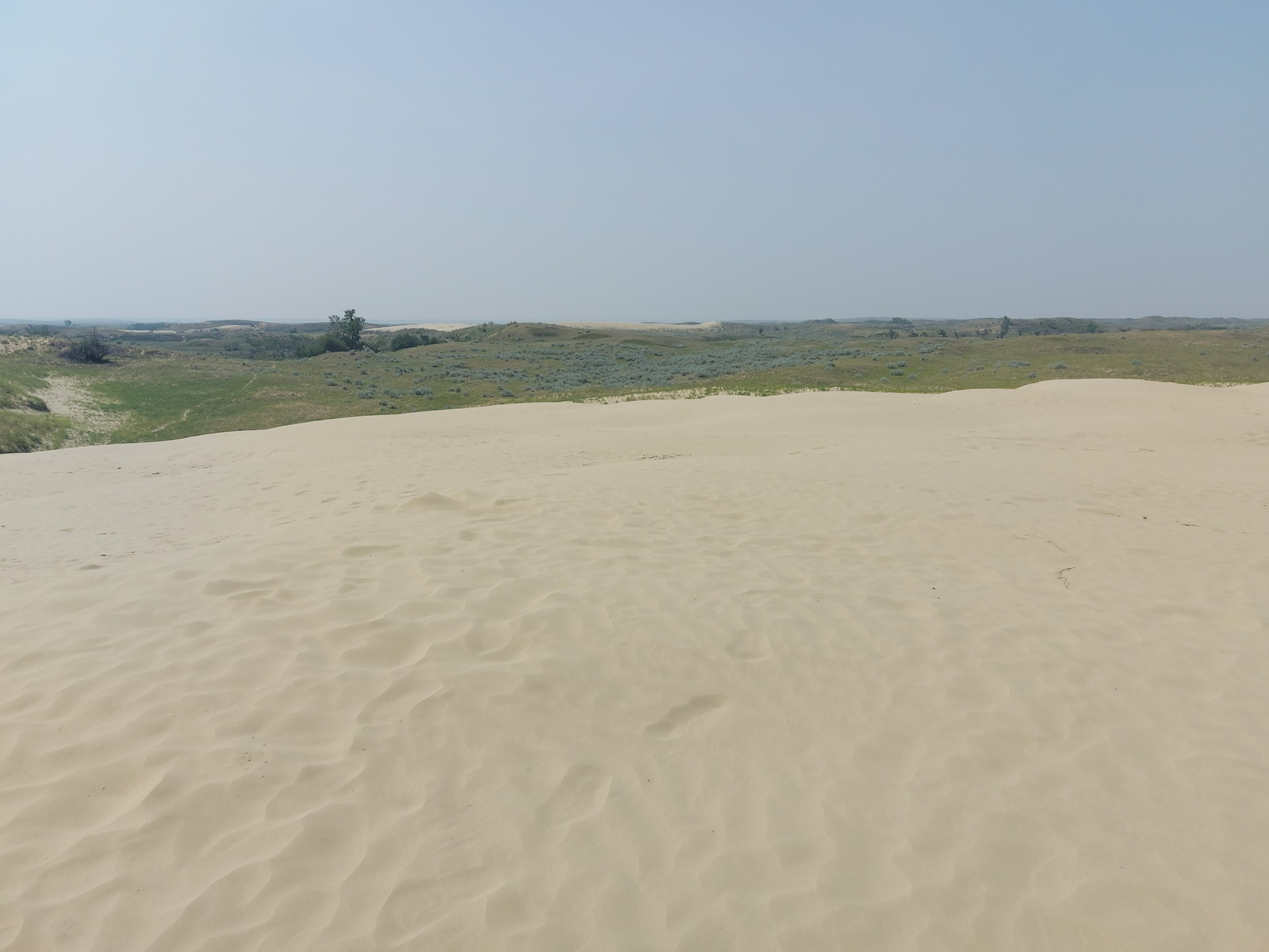
- The Great Sand Hills

Highest point
- Elevation: 727 m (2,385 ft)
- Prominence: 20 m (66 ft)
- Coordinates: 50°41′54″N 109°17′15″W

Dimensions
- Area: 1,900 km^{2} (730 mi^{2})

Geography
- Location within Saskatchewan Location within Canada
- Location: Saskatchewan, Canada
- Rural municipalities: RM of Clinworth No. 230

Geology
- Formed by: Glaciation
- Rock age: 12,000
- Mountain type: Sand dune

The Great Sand Hills, also spelt Great Sandhills, are sand dunes in the south-west region of the Canadian province of Saskatchewan. The Great Sand Hills are the second largest active dunes in Saskatchewan, after Athabasca Sand Dunes, and are part of Great Sandhills Ecological Reserve, which covers an area of about 1,900 km^{2} (730 sq mi). The sands that make up the dunes are made up of very finely ground sand called rock flour that were deposited near the end of the last ice age. The region around the sand hills is often windy and, as a result, the wind blows the fine sands around creating an ever-changing landscape.

Swift Current, the fifth largest city in Saskatchewan, is 159 kilometres (99 mi) to the south-east while Leader, the closest town, is 38 kilometres (24 mi) to the north-west. Access is from Sceptre, which is 10 kilometres (6.2 mi) north of the hills. Sceptre is home to the Great Sandhills Museum & Interpretive Centre.

== Formation ==
The Great Sand Hills were created over 12,000 years ago near the end of the last ice age as the Wisconsin ice sheet retreated. At that time, the landscape of southern Saskatchewan was much different than it is today as there were retreating glaciers and several proglacial lakes. At the height of the glacial advance 18,000 years ago, the ice sheet was almost 2 kilometres (1.2 mi) thick and as the glaciers retreated, they left behind huge piles of sandy debris, glacial till, and moraines while the melting waters carved out huge spillways. The area of the Great Sand Hills, and nearby Elbow Sand Hills at the headwaters of the Qu'Appelle River in Douglas Provincial Park, was covered by Glacial Lake Bursary. The South Saskatchewan Spillway flowed from the lake and as the glaciers disappeared and the waters began to dry up, sand deltas built up causing the South Saskatchewan Spillway to change course, thereby carving out the South Saskatchewan River Valley. Glacial Lake Bursary dried up exposing the sand deltas, which are the sand hills that exist today.

== Flora and fauna ==
Animals found around the hills include the mule deer, pronghorn, fox, coyote, white-tailed deer, badger, weasel, porcupine, and the rare Ord's kangaroo rat. Local birds include the sharp-tailed grouse, white pelican, merlin, peregrine falcon, golden eagle, burrowing owl, mourning dove, and sandhill crane. Vegetation around the hills is limited due to the dry conditions and poor soil but includes prairie grasses, sagebrush, and small clumps of trees such as aspen and willow.

== Gallery ==
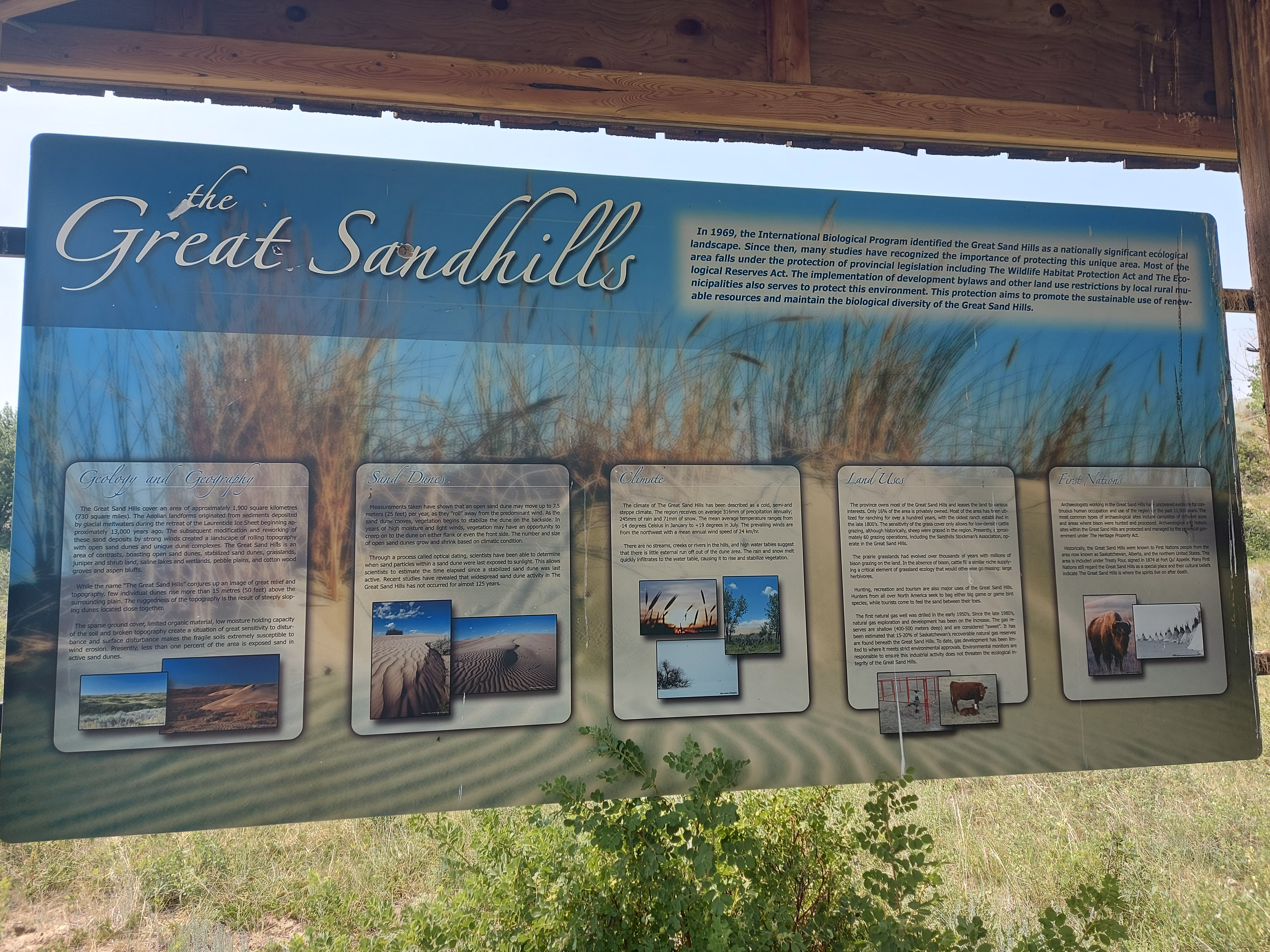
Information sign at the Great Sand Hills

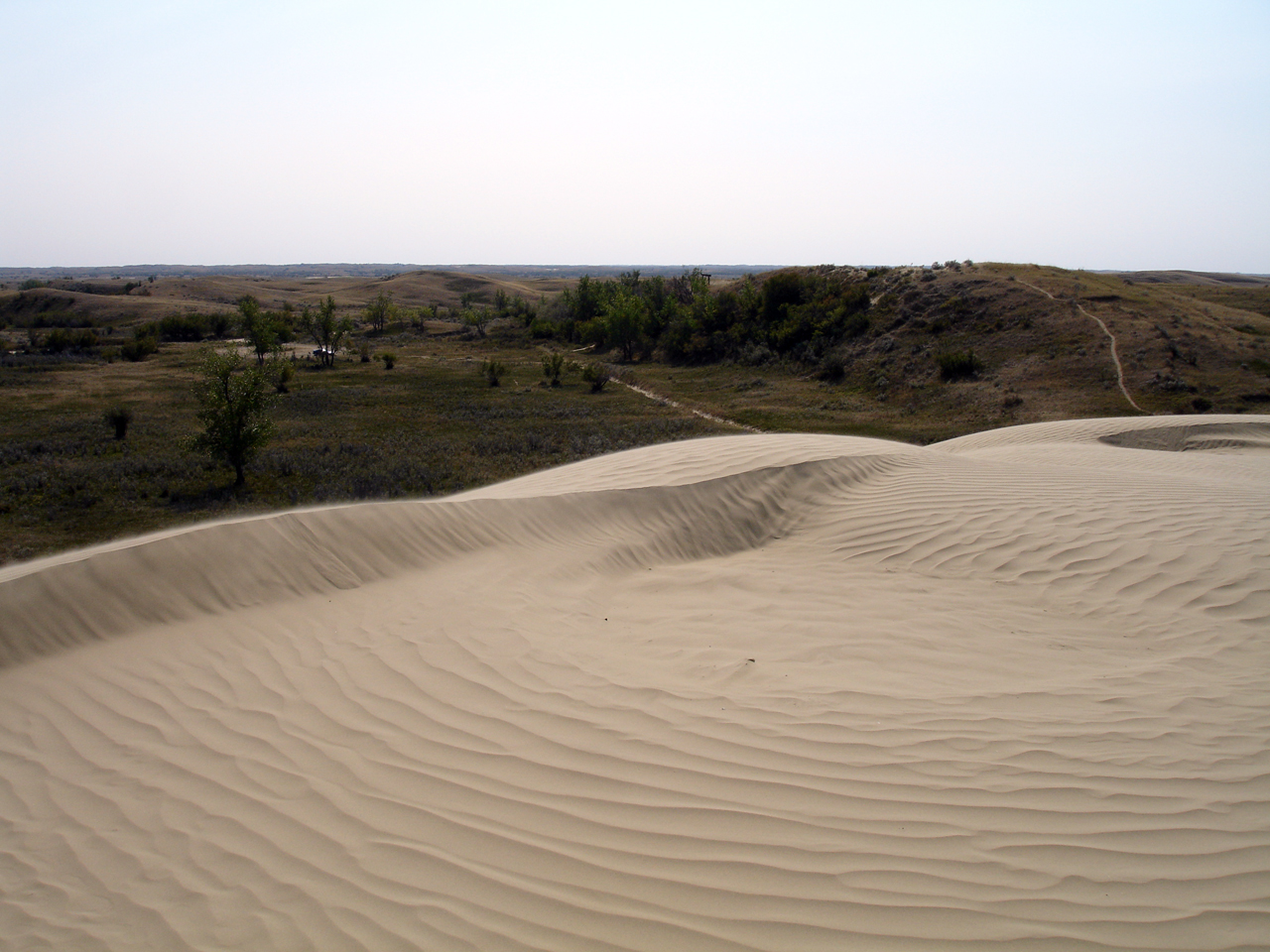
Great Sand Hills

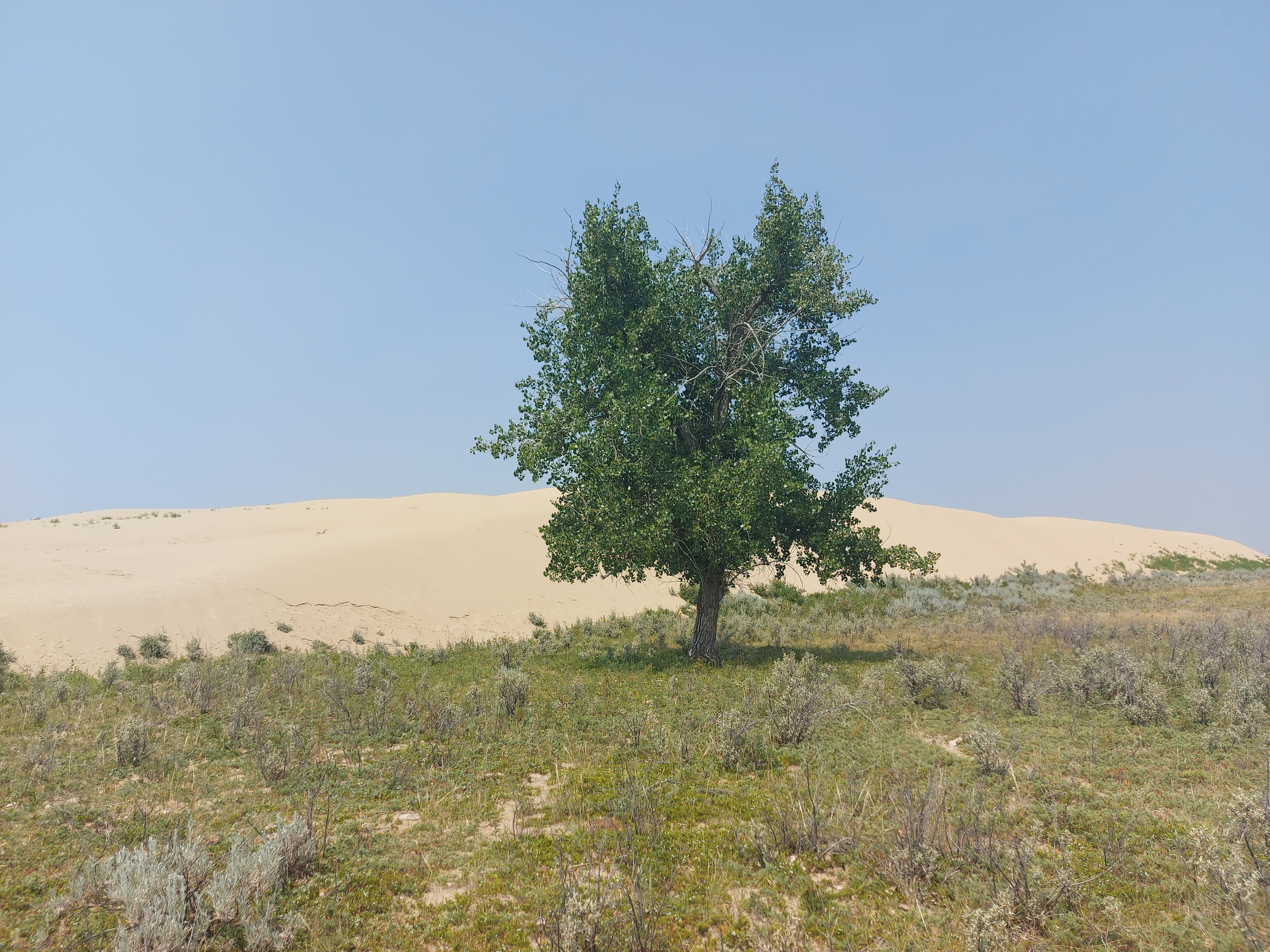
A lone tree at the Great Sand Hills

== See also ==
- List of mountains of Saskatchewan
- List of protected areas of Saskatchewan
- Geology of Saskatchewan
- Geography of Saskatchewan
- Tourism in Saskatchewan
