= Irvin Studer =

Canadian politician

Member of Parliament for Maple Creek
- In office June 1949 – August 1953
- Preceded by: Duncan John McCuaig
- Succeeded by: riding disbanded

Member of Parliament for Swift Current—Maple Creek
- In office August 1953 – March 1958
- Preceded by: Harry Whiteside
- Succeeded by: Jack McIntosh

Personal details
- Born: Irvin William Studer; 15 November 1900 St. Cloud, Minnesota, United States
- Died: 1 June 1997 (aged 96) Kelowna, British Columbia, Canada
- Party: Liberal
- Profession: farmer

Irvin William Studer (15 November 1900 – 1 June 1997) was a Liberal party member of the House of Commons of Canada. He was born in St. Cloud, Minnesota, United States and became a farmer by career.

Studer was elected at the Maple Creek riding in the 1949 general election, after a previous unsuccessful attempt there in 1945. He was re-elected there in 1949. After electoral district changes, Studer became the Liberal candidate in the merged Swift Current—Maple Creek riding where he was returned to Parliament in 1953 and 1957. In the 1958 election, Studer was defeated by Jack McIntosh of the Progressive Conservative party. Studer made two further unsuccessful attempts to unseat McIntosh in the 1962 and 1963 elections.
