= Jack McIntosh (politician) =

Canadian politician (1909–1988)

John (Jack) McIntosh
- Official 1968 portrait

Member of Parliament for Swift Current—Maple Creek
- In office 12 May 1958 – 1 September 1972
- Preceded by: Irvin Studer
- Succeeded by: Frank Fletcher Hamilton

Personal details
- Born: 18 May 1909 Wick, Caithness, Scotland
- Died: 14 April 1988 (aged 78)
- Party: Progressive Conservative
- Spouse: Helen Mary Burroughs m. 1935
- Profession: Merchant

John McIntosh (18 May 1909 – 14 April 1988) was a Progressive Conservative party member of the House of Commons of Canada. He was born in Wick, Caithness, Scotland and became a merchant by career.

The son of John McIntosh and Jessie Swanson, both natives of Scotland, McIntosh was educated in Swift Current, Saskatchewan. In 1935, he married Helen Mary Burroughs. He was a director of the Swift Current Mutual Insurance Company. McIntosh served as a member of the town council for Swift Current from 1948 to 1950 and was mayor from 1955 to 1956.

He was first elected at the Swift Current—Maple Creek riding in the 1958 general election and was re-elected there in 1962, 1963, 1965 and 1968. In 1972, after completing his term in the 28th Canadian Parliament, McIntosh left the House of Commons and did not seek re-election.

== Federal electoral history ==
1958 Canadian federal election
Party	Candidate	Votes
Progressive Conservative	Jack McIntosh	11,618
Liberal	Irvin Studer	6,932
Co-operative Commonwealth	Arthur H. Johnson	6,921
Labor–Progressive	Fred J. Schofield	196

1962 Canadian federal election
Party	Candidate	Votes
Progressive Conservative	Jack McIntosh	10,814
Liberal	Irvin Studer	7,809
New Democratic	Art Johnson	6,009
Social Credit	Ted Kouri	1,711

1963 Canadian federal election
Party	Candidate	Votes
Progressive Conservative	Jack McIntosh	12,963
Liberal	Irvin Studer	7,058
New Democratic	Art Johnson	4,917
Social Credit	Ted Kouri	1,444

1965 Canadian federal election
Party	Candidate	Votes
Progressive Conservative	Jack McIntosh	11,227
Liberal	J. Fred Polley	6,700
New Democratic	Bev Currie	6,238
Social Credit	Ted Kouri	923

1968 Canadian federal election
Party	Candidate	Votes
Progressive Conservative	Jack McIntosh	11,237
New Democratic	Bev Currie	10,207
Liberal	Donald J. Strath	6,930
