= Jeremy Patzer =

Canadian politician

Jeremy Patzer MP

Member of Parliament for Swift Current—Grasslands—Kindersley Cypress Hills—Grasslands (2019–2025)
- Incumbent
- Assumed office October 21, 2019
- Preceded by: David Anderson

Personal details
- Born: March 26, 1987 (age 39) Saskatoon, Saskatchewan, Canada
- Party: Conservative Party of Canada
- Spouse: Kyla Patzer

Jeremy Patzer MP (born 26 March 1987) is a Canadian politician who was elected to represent the riding of Swift Current—Grasslands—Kindersley in the House of Commons of Canada in the 2019 Canadian federal election. He previously served on the board of the Conservative Party constituency association for the riding of Cypress Hills—Grasslands.

Patzer is the nephew of former MP David L. Anderson, his predecessor in this federal riding.

== Electoral record ==
2025 Canadian federal election: Swift Current—Grasslands—Kindersley
** Preliminary results — Not yet official **
Party	Candidate	Votes	%	±%	Expenditures
Conservative	Jeremy Patzer	32,297	82.0%		
Liberal	William Caton	4,420	11.2%		
New Democratic	Alex McPhee	2,261	5.7%		
Independent	Maria Rose Lewans	425	1.1%		
Total valid votes/expense limit					
Total rejected ballots					
Turnout					
Eligible voters					
Conservative hold		Swing		+	
Source: Elections Canada

2021 Canadian federal election: Cypress Hills—Grasslands
Party	Candidate	Votes	%	±%	Expenditures
Conservative	Jeremy Patzer	24,518	71.53	–9.6	$35,741.95
New Democratic	Alex McPhee	3,604	10.51	+1.0	$26,349.39
People's	Charles Reginald Hislop	2,826	8.24	+5.4	$0.00
Liberal	Mackenzie Hird	1,492	4.35	+0.1	$2,023.58
Maverick	Mark Skagen	1,360	3.97	+3.97	$7,334.65
Green	Carol Vandale	284	0.83	–1.1	$0.00
Independent	Maria Rose Lewans	193	0.56	–0.01	$0.00
Total valid votes/expense limit		34,277	99.6	–	$122,866.74
Total rejected ballots		145	0.04		
Turnout		34,422	67		
Eligible voters		49,606			
Conservative hold		Swing		+3.2	
Source: Elections Canada

2019 Canadian federal election: Cypress Hills—Grasslands
Party	Candidate	Votes	%	±%	Expenditures
Conservative	Jeremy Patzer	31,140	81.1	+11.91	$41,250.21
New Democratic	Trevor Peterson	3,666	9.5	-3.71	$10,304.53
Liberal	William Caton	1,595	4.2	-10.66	$5,954.44
People's	Lee Harding	1,075	2.8	-	$3,064.62
Green	Bill Clary	719	1.9	-0.84	$0.00
Independent	Maria Lewans	220	0.6	-	none listed
Total valid votes/expense limit		38,415	100.0		
Total rejected ballots		259			
Turnout		38,674	77.2		
Eligible voters		50,111			
Conservative hold		Swing		+7.81	
Source: Elections Canada
