= William Benyon =

William Benyon may refer to:

- Sir Bill Benyon (1930–2014), British politician, landowner and high sheriff
- Billy Benyon (born 1945), English rugby league footballer

== See also ==
- William Beynon (disambiguation)
