= Geoff Wilson (Canadian politician) =

Canadian politician (born 1941)

Member of Parliament for Swift Current—Maple Creek—Assiniboia Swift Current—Maple Creek (1984–1988)
- In office September 4, 1984 – October 25, 1993
- Preceded by: Frank Fletcher Hamilton
- Succeeded by: Lee Morrison

Personal details
- Born: September 24, 1941 (age 84) Lewes, East Sussex, England
- Party: Progressive Conservative Party of Canada
- Occupation: Politician, lawyer, accountant

Geoff Wilson (born September 24, 1941) is a Canadian politician who served as the Progressive Conservative member of Parliament for Swift Current—Maple Creek from 1984 to 1988 and Swift Current—Maple Creek—Assiniboia from 1988 to 1993.

== Career ==
An accountant and lawyer by profession, Wilson was first elected to the House of Commons of Canada as the Progressive Conservative member of Parliament for Swift Current—Maple Creek, Saskatchewan in the 1984 federal election.

Wilson was re-elected in 1988 in the new riding of Swift Current—Maple Creek—Assiniboia In 1988, the Law Society of Saskatchewan fined Wilson $10,000 for his involvement in a fee-splitting arrangement with Swift Current lawyer Gerald Morris between 1974 and 1984.

Wilson was defeated in 1993 by Lee Morrison of the Reform Party of Canada.

== Electoral history ==
1984 Canadian federal election
Party	Candidate	Votes
Progressive Conservative	Geoff Wilson	14,590
New Democratic	Don Beveridge	8,196
Liberal	Jack Wiebe	5,967
Confederation of Regions	Lorne Larson	582

1988 Canadian federal election
Party	Candidate	Votes	%	±%
Progressive Conservative	Geoff Wilson	15,944	44.0	
New Democratic Party	Laura Balas	11,827	32.7	
Liberal	Paul Lewans	7,958	22.0	
Confederation of Regions	Lorne Larson	468	1.3	

1993 Canadian federal election
Party	Candidate	Votes	%	±%
Reform	Lee Morrison	11,486	34.9	
Liberal	Rob Heinrichs	10,661	32.4	
New Democratic Party	Lois Ross	5,448	16.5	
Progressive Conservative	Geoff Wilson	5,119	15.5	
Natural Law	Shirley Wilson	216	0.7	

Parliament of Canada
Preceded by Frank Hamilton	Member of Parliament for Swift Current—Maple Creek; 1984–1988	Succeeded by The electoral district was abolished in 1987.
Preceded by The electoral district was created in 1987.	Member of Parliament for Swift Current—Maple Creek—Assiniboia; 1988–1993	Succeeded by Lee Morrison
