= J. Gordon Ross =

Canadian politician

Member of Parliament for Moose Jaw
- In office October 1925 – July 1930
- Preceded by: Edward Nicholas Hopkins
- Succeeded by: William Addison Beynon

Member of Parliament for Moose Jaw
- In office October 1935 – June 1945
- Preceded by: William Addison Beynon
- Succeeded by: Ross Thatcher

Personal details
- Born: John Gordon Ross; 11 October 1891 Moose Jaw, Northwest Territories
- Died: 7 September 1972 (aged 80) Moose Jaw, Saskatchewan
- Party: Liberal
- Spouse(s): Minnie Mary Kern m. 13 March 1915
- Profession: farmer, rancher

John Gordon Ross (11 October 1891 – 7 September 1972) was a Liberal party member of the House of Commons of Canada. He was born in Moose Jaw, Northwest Territories (now Saskatchewan), whose career included farming and ranching.

Ross, the son of Senator James Hamilton Ross, attended St. Andrew's College in Toronto, then Macdonald Agricultural College at Sainte-Anne-de-Bellevue, Quebec.

He was first elected to Parliament at the Moose Jaw riding in the 1925 general election and re-elected there in 1926. In the 1930 election, he was defeated by William Addison Beynon of the Conservative party. In the 1935 election, Ross won back the riding from Beynon and was re-elected in 1940. In 1945, Ross was defeated by Ross Thatcher of the Co-operative Commonwealth Federation.
