= Douglas Neil =

Canadian politician

MP for Moose Jaw
- In office 4 January 1973 – 9 July 1984
- Preceded by: John Skoberg
- Succeeded by: Bill Gottselig

Personal details
- Born: 3 February 1924 Lipton, Saskatchewan, Canada
- Died: 21 February 1994 (aged 70)
- Party: Progressive Conservative
- Occupation: Lawyer

Douglas Charles Neil (3 February 1924 – 21 February 1994) was a Canadian lawyer and politician. Neil served as a Progressive Conservative party member of the House of Commons of Canada. He was born in Lipton, Saskatchewan.

He represented Saskatchewan's Moose Jaw electoral district at which he was elected in 1972. Neil won re-election there in the 1974, 1979 and 1980 federal elections. He left federal politics in 1984 for personal causes and did not campaign in that year's national elections after serving in the 29th to 32nd Canadian Parliaments.
