= Roy Theodore Graham =

Canadian politician

The Honourable Roy T. Graham

Member of Parliament for Swift Current
- In office March 1940 – June 1945
- Preceded by: Charles Edward Bothwell
- Succeeded by: Thomas John Bentley

Personal details
- Born: Royal Theodore Graham; 11 December 1887 Smiths Falls, Ontario, Canada
- Died: 26 February 1965 (aged 77)
- Party: Liberal
- Spouse(s): Gertrude Amy Mann m. 6 August 1924
- Profession: barrister

Roy Theodore Graham (11 December 1887 – 26 February 1965) was a Liberal party member of the House of Commons of Canada. He was born in Smiths Falls, Ontario, and became a barrister by career.

Graham attended school at Smiths Falls, then one year at Osgoode Hall Law School.

He was elected to Parliament at the Swift Current riding in the 1940 general election then defeated in the 1945 election by Thomas John Bentley of the Co-operative Commonwealth Federation.

He was appointed a judge of the Court of King's Bench for Saskatchewan in 1949. He resigned owing to ill-health in 1960.
