= Cypress Hills—Grasslands =

Federal electoral district in Saskatchewan, Canada

Saskatchewan electoral district
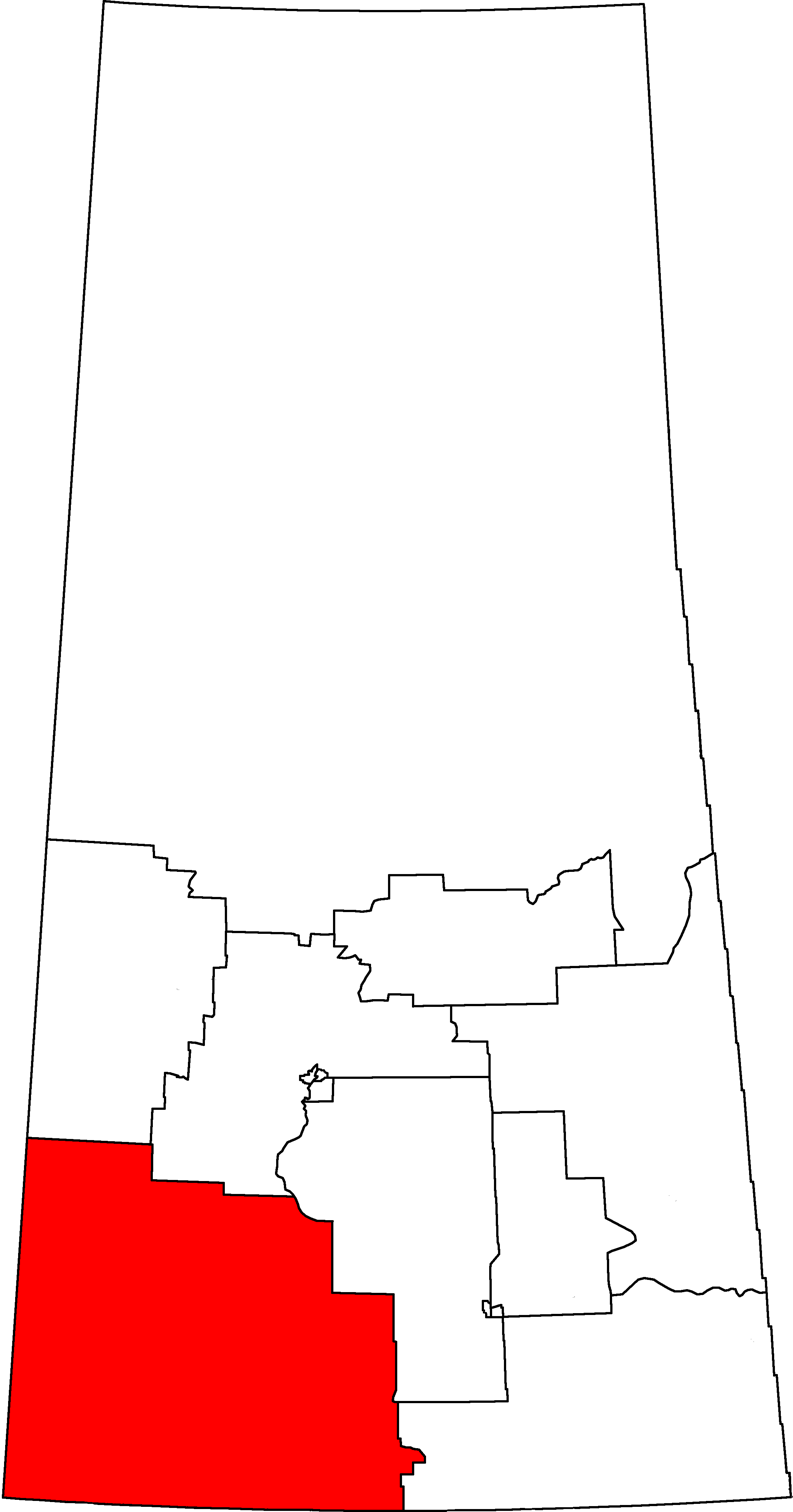
- Cypress Hills—Grasslands in relation to other Saskatchewan federal electoral districts as of the 2013 representation order

Federal electoral district
- Legislature: House of Commons
MP
Jeremy Patzer
Conservative
- District created: 1996
- District abolished: 2023
- First contested: 1997
- Last contested: 2021
- District webpage: profile, map

Demographics
- Population (2021): 68,314
- Electors (2015): 49,713
- Area (km²): 77,822
- Pop. density (per km²): 0.88
- Census subdivision(s): Swift Current, Kindersley, Assiniboia, Maple Creek

Cypress Hills—Grasslands was a federal electoral district in Saskatchewan, Canada, that was represented in the House of Commons of Canada from 1997 to 2025.

Following the 2022 Canadian federal electoral redistribution, this riding was superseded by Swift Current—Grasslands—Kindersley during the 2025 Canadian federal election. It lost the Rural Municipalities of Stonehenge, Lake of the Rivers, Willow Bunch, Old Post and Poplar Valley, and all enclosed towns and villages to Souris—Moose Mountain, lost the Rural Municipalities of Maple Bush, Enfield, Chaplin, Wheatlands, Caron, Shamrock, Rodgers, Hillsborough, Gravelbourg, Sutton, and Lake Johnston plus all enclosed towns and villages to Moose Jaw—Lake Centre—Lanigan, gained the Rural Municipalities of Eye Hill, Grass Lake, Tramping Lake, Reford, Rosemount, Heart's Hill, Progress, Mariposa, Grandview, Antelope Park, Prairiedale, Oakdale, Winslow and all enclosed towns and villages in those RMs from Battlefords—Lloydminster, and gained the Rural Municipalities of Biggar, Perdue, Mountain View, Marriott, Harris, Montrose, Pleasant Valley, St. Andrews, Milden and Fertile Valley, including all enclosed towns and villages from Carlton Trail—Eagle Creek.

== Geography ==
The district is in the southwestern corner of the province of Saskatchewan.

== History ==
The electoral district was created in 1996 from Kindersley—Lloydminster, Moose Jaw—Lake Centre and Swift Current—Maple Creek—Assiniboia ridings.

This riding lost territory to Carlton Trail—Eagle Creek and gained territory from Battlefords—Lloydminster and Palliser during the 2012 electoral redistribution.

=== Historical boundaries ===
1996 representation order

2013 representation order

== Demographics ==
Panethnic groups in Cypress Hills—Grasslands (2011−2021)
| Panethnic group | 2021 | | 2016 | | 2011 | |
| Panethnic group | Pop. | % | Pop. | % | Pop. | % |
|---|---|---|---|---|---|---|
| European (Note: Statistic includes all persons that did not make up part of a visible minority or an indigenous identity.) | 55,000 | 87.66% | 57,580 | 90.66% | 59,640 | 94.16% |
| Indigenous | 3,420 | 5.45% | 2,710 | 4.27% | 1,950 | 3.08% |
| Southeast Asian (Note: Statistic includes total responses of "Filipino" and "Southeast Asian" under visible minority section on census.) | 2,325 | 3.71% | 1,600 | 2.52% | 880 | 1.39% |
| South Asian | 715 | 1.14% | 440 | 0.69% | 150 | 0.24% |
| East Asian (Note: Statistic includes total responses of "Chinese", "Korean", and "Japanese" under visible minority section on census.) | 525 | 0.84% | 550 | 0.87% | 445 | 0.7% |
| African | 305 | 0.49% | 195 | 0.31% | 155 | 0.24% |
| Latin American | 225 | 0.36% | 185 | 0.29% | 95 | 0.15% |
| Middle Eastern (Note: Statistic includes total responses of "West Asian" and "Arab" under visible minority section on census.) | 110 | 0.18% | 125 | 0.2% | 0 | 0% |
| Other/multiracial (Note: Statistic includes total responses of "Visible minority, n.i.e." and "Multiple visible minorities" under visible minority section on census.) | 130 | 0.21% | 125 | 0.2% | 0 | 0% |
| Total responses | 62,740 | 91.84% | 63,510 | 92.91% | 63,340 | 93.38% |
| Total population | 68,314 | 100% | 68,353 | 100% | 67,834 | 100% |
Notes: Totals greater than 100% due to multiple origin responses. Demographics based on 2012 Canadian federal electoral redistribution riding boundaries.

== Members of Parliament ==
This riding has elected the following members of the House of Commons:

| Parliament | Years | Member | Party |
|---|---|---|---|
Cypress Hills—Grasslands; Riding created from Kindersley—Lloydminster, Moose Jaw—Lake Centre and Swift Current—Maple Creek—Assiniboia
| 36th | 1997–2000 | Lee Morrison | Reform |
| 36th | 2000–2000 | Lee Morrison | Alliance |
| 37th | 2000–2003 | David Anderson | Alliance |
| 37th | 2003–2004 | David Anderson | Conservative |
| 38th | 2004–2006 | David Anderson | Conservative |
| 39th | 2006–2008 | David Anderson | Conservative |
| 40th | 2008–2011 | David Anderson | Conservative |
| 41st | 2011–2015 | David Anderson | Conservative |
| 42nd | 2015–2019 | David Anderson | Conservative |
| 43rd | 2019–2021 | Jeremy Patzer | Conservative |
| 44th | 2021–2025 | Jeremy Patzer | Conservative |

== Election results ==
Graph of election results in Cypress Hills—Grasslands (minor parties that never got 2% of the vote or didn't run consistently are omitted) View source data.

2021 Canadian federal election
| Party | Candidate | Votes | % | ±% | Expenditures |
|---|---|---|---|---|---|
| Conservative | Jeremy Patzer | 24,518 | 71.53 | –9.6 | $35,741.95 |
| New Democratic | Alex McPhee | 3,604 | 10.51 | +1.0 | $26,349.39 |
| People's | Charles Reginald Hislop | 2,826 | 8.24 | +5.4 | $0.00 |
| Liberal | Mackenzie Hird | 1,492 | 4.35 | +0.1 | $2,023.58 |
| Maverick | Mark Skagen | 1,360 | 3.97 | +3.97 | $7,334.65 |
| Green | Carol Vandale | 284 | 0.83 | –1.1 | $0.00 |
| Independent | Maria Rose Lewans | 193 | 0.56 | –0.01 | $0.00 |
| Total valid votes/expense limit | | 34,277 | 99.6 | – | $122,866.74 |
| Total rejected ballots | | 145 | 0.04 | | |
| Turnout | | 34,422 | 67 | | |
| Eligible voters | | 49,606 | | | |
| Conservative hold | | Swing | | +3.2 | |
Source: Elections Canada

2019 Canadian federal election
| Party | Candidate | Votes | % | ±% | Expenditures |
|---|---|---|---|---|---|
| Conservative | Jeremy Patzer | 31,140 | 81.1 | +11.91 | $41,250.21 |
| New Democratic | Trevor Peterson | 3,666 | 9.5 | -3.71 | $10,304.53 |
| Liberal | William Caton | 1,595 | 4.2 | -10.66 | $5,954.44 |
| People's | Lee Harding | 1,075 | 2.8 | - | $3,064.62 |
| Green | Bill Clary | 719 | 1.9 | -0.84 | $0.00 |
| Independent | Maria Lewans | 220 | 0.6 | - | none listed |
| Total valid votes/expense limit | | 38,415 | 100.0 | | |
| Total rejected ballots | | 259 | | | |
| Turnout | | 38,674 | 77.2 | | |
| Eligible voters | | 50,111 | | | |
| Conservative hold | | Swing | | +7.81 | |
Source: Elections Canada

2015 Canadian federal election
| Party | Candidate | Votes | % | ±% | Expenditures |
|---|---|---|---|---|---|
| Conservative | David Anderson | 25,050 | 69.19 | -1.38 | $53,440.65 |
| Liberal | Marvin Wiens | 5,381 | 14.86 | +9.02 | $50,766.23 |
| New Democratic | Trevor Peterson | 4,783 | 13.21 | -7.59 | $43,201.40 |
| Green | Bill Caton | 993 | 2.74 | -0.04 | $1,007.60 |
| Total valid votes/expense limit | | 36,207 | 100.0 | | $235,061.03 |
| Total rejected ballots | | 99 | 0.27 | -0.03 | |
| Turnout | | 36,306 | 71.99 | +4.89 | |
| Eligible voters | | 50,426 | | | |
| Conservative hold | | Swing | | -5.22 | |
Source: Elections Canada

2011 federal election redistributed results
| Party | Vote | % |
|---|---|---|
| Conservative | 22,871 | 70.57 |
| New Democratic | 6,742 | 20.80 |
| Liberal | 1,894 | 5.84 |
| Green | 901 | 2.78 |

2011 Canadian federal election
| Party | Candidate | Votes | % | ±% | Expenditures |
|---|---|---|---|---|---|
| Conservative | David L. Anderson | 20,555 | 69.8 | +5.4 | $39,752 |
| New Democratic | Trevor Peterson | 6,248 | 21.2 | +5.4 | $9,855 |
| Liberal | Duane Filson | 1,838 | 6.2 | -7.1 | $27,813 |
| Green | Helmi Scott | 788 | 2.7 | -3.9 | $517 |
| Total valid votes/expense limit | | 29,429 | 100.0 | | $94,253 |
| Total rejected ballots | | 79 | 0.3 | 0.0 | |
| Turnout | | 29,508 | 67.1 | +4 | |
| Eligible voters | | 43,997 | – | – | |
| Conservative hold | | Swing | | +6.25 | |

2008 Canadian federal election
| Party | Candidate | Votes | % | ±% | Expenditures |
|---|---|---|---|---|---|
| Conservative | David L. Anderson | 17,922 | 64.4 | -2.1 | $51,570 |
| New Democratic | Scott Wilson | 4,394 | 15.8 | -1.1 | $5,879 |
| Liberal | Duane Filson | 3,691 | 13.3 | +0.4 | $23,849 |
| Green | Bill Clary | 1,840 | 6.6 | +2.8 | $4,012 |
| Total valid votes/expense limit | | 27,847 | 100.0 | | $91,352 |
| Total rejected ballots | | 81 | 0.3 | 0.0 | |
| Turnout | | 27,928 | 63 | -3 | |
| Conservative hold | | Swing | | +1.0 | |

2006 Canadian federal election
| Party | Candidate | Votes | % | ±% | Expenditures |
|---|---|---|---|---|---|
| Conservative | David L. Anderson | 20,035 | 66.5 | +5.8 | $42,285 |
| New Democratic | Mike Eason | 5,076 | 16.8 | +0.3 | $12,076 |
| Liberal | Bill Caton | 3,885 | 12.9 | -5.8 | $3,553 |
| Green | Amanda Knorr | 1,141 | 3.8 | -0.4 | – |
| Total valid votes | | 30,137 | 100.0 | | – |
| Total rejected ballots | | 85 | 0.3 | -0.1 | |
| Turnout | | 30,222 | 66.5 | +3 | |
| Conservative hold | | Swing | | +5.8 | |

2004 Canadian federal election
| Party | Candidate | Votes | % | ±% | Expenditures |
|---|---|---|---|---|---|
| Conservative | David L. Anderson | 18,010 | 60.6 | -9.9 | $35,176 |
| Liberal | Bill Caton | 5,547 | 18.7 | +6.1 | $29,831 |
| New Democratic | Jeff Potts | 4,901 | 16.5 | –0.4 | $17,512 |
| Green | Bev Currie | 1,243 | 4.2 | | $805 |
| Total valid votes | | 29,701 | 100 | | – |
| Total rejected ballots | | 117 | 0.4 | +0.1 | |
| Turnout | | 29,818 | 63 | -2 | |
| Conservative hold | | Swing | | -8.0 | |

2000 Canadian federal election
| Party | Candidate | Votes | % | ±% | Expenditures |
|---|---|---|---|---|---|
| Alliance | David L. Anderson | 18,593 | 61.6 | +12.5 | $33,948 |
| New Democratic | Keith Murch | 5,101 | 16.9 | -2.5 | $14,293 |
| Liberal | Marlin Bryce Belt | 3,791 | 12.6 | -8.7 | $722 |
| Progressive Conservative | Bill Caton | 2,676 | 8.9 | -1.3 | $7,462 |
| Total valid votes | | 30,161 | 100 | | – |
| Total rejected ballots | | 90 | 0.3 | 0.0 | |
| Turnout | | 30,251 | 65 | -2.4 | |
| Alliance hold | | Swing | | +10.6 | |

1997 Canadian federal election
| Party | Candidate | Votes | % | ±% | Expenditures |
|---|---|---|---|---|---|
| Reform | Lee Morrison | 16,439 | 49.1 | – | $36,935 |
| Liberal | Ron Gleim | 7,130 | 21.3 | – | $52,705 |
| New Democratic | Dean Smith | 6,490 | 19.4 | – | $36,138 |
| Progressive Conservative | Marcel Fournier | 3,421 | 10.2 | – | $9,917 |
| Total valid votes | | 33,480 | 100 | | – |
| Total rejected ballots | | 105 | 0.3 | | |
| Turnout | | 33,585 | 67.4 | | |

== See also ==
- List of Canadian electoral districts
- Historical federal electoral districts of Canada
