= Harry Whiteside =

Canadian politician

Member of Parliament for Swift Current
- In office June 1949 – June 1953
- Preceded by: Thomas John Bentley
- Succeeded by: Irvin Studer

Personal details
- Born: 4 July 1909 Pasqua, Saskatchewan, Canada
- Died: 18 May 1984 (aged 74) Delta, British Columbia, Canada
- Party: Liberal
- Spouse(s): E. Marguerite McWilliam m. 15 December 1938
- Profession: Farmer

Harry Bayne Whiteside (4 July 1909 – 18 May 1984) was a Liberal party member of the House of Commons of Canada. He was born in Pasqua, Saskatchewan and became a farmer by career.

Whiteside was educated in Sceptre, Saskatchewan and at Regina. From 1943 to 1945, he was a trustee for Sceptre School District #3678. After this until 1947, he was reeve of rural municipality Clinworth No. 230, Saskatchewan.

He was first elected to Parliament at the Swift Current riding in the 1949 general election. After completing his only federal term, the 21st Canadian Parliament, Whiteside did not seek another federal term in the 1953 election.

He died in Delta, British Columbia in 1984.
