= Swift Current—Grasslands—Kindersley =

Saskatchewan electoral district
- Interactive map of riding boundaries from the 2025 federal election. Points indicate the communities of Swift Current and Kindersley, as well as Grasslands National Park.

Federal electoral district
- Legislature: House of Commons
MP
Jeremy Patzer
Conservative
- District created: 2023
- First contested: 2025
- District webpage: profile, map

Demographics
- Population (2021): 75,686
- Electors (2025): 54,484
- Area (km²): 80,693
- Pop. density (per km²): 0.94
- Census subdivision(s): Swift Current, Kindersley, Rosetown, Maple Creek, Biggar, Swift Current, Shaunavon, Macklin, Maple Creek, Kindersley

Swift Current—Grasslands—Kindersley is a federal electoral district in Saskatchewan, Canada, that was created in the 2022 Canadian federal electoral redistribution.

Compared to its predecessor riding, Cypress Hills—Grasslands, Swift Current—Grasslands—Kindersley loses the town of Assiniboia but has added new territory in the north, incorporating Biggar and Rosetown. It is partially named after Grasslands National Park.

== Geography ==
The district occupies the southwestern corner of the province of Saskatchewan.

== History ==
The district was created by representation order in 2023, but inherits most of the former territory of Cypress Hills—Grasslands.

=== Historical boundaries ===
1952 representation order (as Swift Current—Maple Creek)

1966 representation order

1976 representation order

1987 representation order (as Swift Current—Maple Creek—Assiniboia)

1996 representation order (as Cypress Hills—Grasslands)

2013 representation order

=== Members of Parliament ===
This riding has elected the following members of Parliament:

Parliament	Years	Member	Party
Swift Current—Grasslands—Kindersley; Riding created from Cypress Hills—Grasslands and Carlton Trail—Eagle Creek
45th	2025–present	Jeremy Patzer	Conservative

== Election results ==
2025 Canadian federal election
** Preliminary results — Not yet official **
Party	Candidate	Votes	%	±%	Expenditures
Conservative	Jeremy Patzer	32,297	82.0%		
Liberal	William Caton	4,420	11.2%		
New Democratic	Alex McPhee	2,261	5.7%		
Independent	Maria Rose Lewans	425	1.1%		
Total valid votes/expense limit					
Total rejected ballots					
Turnout					
Eligible voters					
Conservative hold		Swing		+	
Source: Elections Canada

2021 federal election redistributed results
Party	Vote	%
Conservative	27,528	72.46
New Democratic	3,903	10.27
People's	2,879	7.58
Liberal	1,563	4.11
Green	320	0.84
Others	1,800	4.74
