= Thomas John Bentley =

Canadian politician

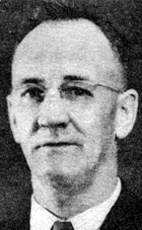

Member of the Canadian Parliament for Swift Current
- In office 1945–1949
- Preceded by: Roy Theodore Graham
- Succeeded by: Harry B. Whiteside

Personal details
- Born: 3 May 1891 Dartmouth, Nova Scotia, Canada
- Died: 2 June 1983 (aged 92) Vancouver, British Columbia, Canada
- Party: Cooperative Commonwealth Federation
- Occupation: agrologist, farmer, organizer

Thomas John Bentley, DCM (3 May 1891 – 2 June 1983) was a Canadian politician, agrologist, farmer and organizer.

The son of Wells Bentley and Annie Brown, he was educated in Nova Scotia. Bentley went on to work as a logger and in railway construction. He married Lenora Rachel Chabot. He served overseas in the 66th Battalion, Edmonton Guards of the Canadian Expeditionary Force during World War I, transferring to the 49th Battalion, Alberta Regiment, he was wounded in the head on 26 December 1916 at Neuville St. Vaast. Recovered, he went on to receive the Distinguished Conduct Medal. He received a commission as a lieutenant on 22 November 1918. After his return to Canada in 1919, he moved to the Preeceville, Saskatchewan area, where he farmed. From 1926 to 1944, Bentley worked for the Saskatchewan Wheat Pool.

He was elected to the House of Commons of Canada in 1945 as a Member of the Cooperative Commonwealth Federation to represent the riding of Swift Current. After his defeat when he ran for reelection in 1949, he was elected to the Legislative Assembly of Saskatchewan that same year as a member of the Saskatchewan Cooperative Commonwealth Federation to represent the electoral district of Gull Lake. During this term, he served concurrently as the Minister of Public Health and the Minister in charge of the Health Services Planning Commission. He was re-elected to the Saskatchewan legislature in 1952 to represent Shaunavon and appointed Minister of Social Welfare and Rehabilitation in 1956.

After leaving politics in 1960, Bentley served two years on a medicare advisory committee headed by Walter P. Thompson. He then moved to Saskatoon and later Vancouver, British Columbia, where he later died at the age of 92.

His great-great-nephew Graham Sucha served as the MLA for Calgary Shaw from 2015 to 2019.
