= Ira Eugene Argue =

Canadian politician

Member of Parliament for Swift Current—Maple Creek
- In office 1917–1921
- Preceded by: formerly Swift Current riding
- Succeeded by: Arthur John Lewis

Personal details
- Born: 1865 Victoria County, Canada West
- Died: August 5, 1927 (aged 61–62)
- Party: Unionist
- Profession: businessman, farmer

Ira Eugene Argue (September 1, 1865 in Victoria County, Canada West – August 5, 1927) was a Canadian politician, businessman and farmer. He was elected to the House of Commons of Canada as a Member of the Unionist Party in the 1917 election to represent the riding of Swift Current—Maple Creek.
