= Rod Laporte =

Canadian politician (born 1953)

Rodney Edward Laporte (born 24 October 1953 in Moose Jaw, Saskatchewan) is a Saskatchewan lawyer and a former Canadian Member of Parliament (MP). Before becoming a politician, Laporte had been a student of history and Law at the University of Regina.

Laporte became the New Democratic Party (NDP) MP for Moose Jaw—Lake Centre in the 1988 Canadian federal election, winning a riding covering territory that had been a Progressive Conservative (PC) stronghold for thirty years. It was a very narrow win, as Laporte garnered only 408 votes more than PC candidate Bill Gottselig. In the 1993 election, he lost the seat to Reform Party candidate Allan Kerpan. His loss was even narrower that his initial win: only 310 votes separated him from the winner.

During the 2002–2003 NDP leadership race, Laporte endorsed Bill Blaikie. After leaving politics, Laporte practised law for the Saskatchewan Legal Aid Commission in Meadow Lake, Saskatchewan.

Parliament of Canada
Preceded by The electoral district was created in 1987.	Member of Parliament for Moose Jaw—Lake Centre; 1988—1993	Succeeded by Allan Kerpan
