= Frank Fletcher Hamilton =

Canadian politician

Member of Parliament for Swift Current—Maple Creek
- In office 4 January 1973 – 9 July 1984
- Preceded by: Jack McIntosh
- Succeeded by: Geoff Wilson

Personal details
- Born: 3 April 1921 Mazenod, Saskatchewan, Canada
- Died: 1 February 2008 (aged 86)
- Party: P.C.
- Spouse(s): Wanda Fern Jones (m. 20 May 1972); 1 previous marriage
- Profession: Farmer

Frank Fletcher Hamilton (3 April 1921 – 1 February 2008) was a Canadian politician from Saskatchewan, a Progressive Conservative member for Swift Current—Maple Creek of the House of Commons between 1972 and 1984.

== Early life ==
Hamilton attended school in Ford County, Saskatchewan, then secondary school at Mazenod, then the University of Saskatchewan. He served in the Royal Canadian Air Force from 1940 to 1951.

== Political career ==
He began his venture into politics in 1945 by representing the Progressive Conservative in the 1945 Canadian federal election and the 1953 Canadian federal election. He was defeated both times. Both Wood Mountain and Assiniboia (respectively) are historical federal electoral districts of Canada.

Hamilton was elected through 4 separate successful elections (1972–1984). He represented the federal riding of Swift Current—Maple Creek, Saskatchewan.

The 29th Canadian Parliament was in session from 4 January 1973 until 9 May 1974. The 30th Canadian Parliament was in session from 30 September 1974 until 26 March 1979. The 31st Canadian Parliament was a briefly lived parliament in session from 9 October until 14 December 1979 under the leadership of a Progressive Conservative minority and Prime Minister Joe Clark. The 32nd Canadian Parliament was in session from 14 April 1980 until 9 July 1984 and was controlled by a Liberal Party majority, led first by Prime Minister Pierre Trudeau and the 22nd Canadian Ministry, and then by Prime Minister John Turner.

== Electoral history ==
1945 Canadian federal election
Party	Candidate	Votes
Co-operative Commonwealth	Hazen Robert Argue	7,772
Liberal	Charles William Johnson	5,641
Progressive Conservative	Frank Fletcher Hamilton	2,718

1953 Canadian federal election
Party	Candidate	Votes
Co-operative Commonwealth	Hazen Argue	10,596
Liberal	Elmer William Meek	7,218
Progressive Conservative	Frank Fletcher Hamilton	1,860
Social Credit	Arnold L. Meginbir	698

1972 Canadian federal election
Party	Candidate	Votes
Progressive Conservative	Frank Fletcher Hamilton	11,500
New Democratic	Merv Johnson	9,275
Liberal	George Leith	7,165
Social Credit	Ted Kouri	584
Independent	Charles Kieling	138

1974 Canadian federal election
Party	Candidate	Votes
Progressive Conservative	Frank Fletcher Hamilton	11,336
Liberal	George Leith	8,091
New Democratic	Ed Wallace	7,477
Social Credit	Isaac Klaassen	390

1979 Canadian federal election
Party	Candidate	Votes
Progressive Conservative	Frank Fletcher Hamilton	15,213
New Democratic	Ron Gates	8,720
Liberal	Gene Maurice	5,171

1980 Canadian federal election
Party	Candidate	Votes
Progressive Conservative	Frank Fletcher Hamilton	12,917
New Democratic	Ron Gates	8,338
Liberal	Gene Maurice	5,673
