= Swift Current—Maple Creek—Assiniboia =

Former federal electoral district in Saskatchewan, Canada

Swift Current—Maple Creek—Assiniboia was a federal electoral district in Saskatchewan, Canada, that was represented in the House of Commons of Canada from 1988 to 1997. This riding was created in 1987 from parts of Swift Current—Maple Creek and Assiniboia ridings.

The electoral district was abolished in 1996 when it was redistributed into Cypress Hills—Grasslands, Palliser and Souris—Moose Mountain ridings.

== Electoral history ==
1988 Canadian federal election
Party	Candidate	Votes	%	±%
Progressive Conservative	Geoff Wilson	15,944	44.0	
New Democratic Party	Laura Balas	11,827	32.7	
Liberal	Paul Lewans	7,958	22.0	
Confederation of Regions	Lorne Larson	468	1.3	

1993 Canadian federal election
Party	Candidate	Votes	%	±%
Reform	Lee Morrison	11,486	34.9	
Liberal	Rob Heinrichs	10,661	32.4	
New Democratic Party	Lois Ross	5,448	16.5	
Progressive Conservative	Geoff Wilson	5,119	15.5	
Natural Law	Shirley Wilson	216	0.7	

== See also ==
- List of Canadian electoral districts
- Historical federal electoral districts of Canada
