= Scoop Lewry =

Canadian politician and reporter

Louis Harrington "Scoop" Lewry
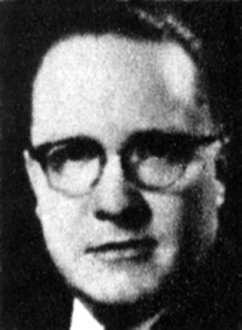

Member of the Canadian Parliament for Moose Jaw—Lake Centre
- In office 1957–1958
- Preceded by: Ross Thatcher
- Succeeded by: J. Ernest Pascoe

Personal details
- Born: April 16, 1919 Moose Jaw, Saskatchewan, Canada
- Died: February 25, 1992 (aged 72) Moose Jaw, Saskatchewan, Canada
- Party: CCF

Louis Harrington "Scoop" Lewry, CM (April 16, 1919 – February 25, 1992) was a Canadian politician and reporter.

Born in Moose Jaw, Saskatchewan, he was elected as an alderman on the Moose Jaw City Council in 1948. Lewry later became mayor of the city in 1950 and served in this role until 1956. He was married to Jean Lewry (née Munroe), and had five children, Philip (Doreen Ludke), Catherine (Robert Patterson), Janet, Harold, and Mary (Roger Rothwell). He had 13 grandchildren and 7 great-grandchildren.

In 1957, he ran and won in a close race for the position of Member of Parliament for Moose Jaw—Lake Centre as a Co-operative Commonwealth Federation candidate. He ran again in 1958, losing widely to J. Ernest Pascoe in the Diefenbaker landslide. Pascoe was the same Conservative candidate he had defeated a year earlier.

Lewry then served as mayor again, from 1965 to 1970 and, in a third term of office, from 1983 to 1988.

In 1980, he was made a Member of the Order of Canada.
