= Moose Jaw—Lake Centre =

Former federal electoral district in Saskatchewan, Canada

Moose Jaw—Lake Centre was a federal electoral district in Saskatchewan, Canada, that was represented in the House of Commons of Canada from 1953 to 1968 and from 1988 to 1997. This riding was created in 1953 from parts of Lake Centre, Moose Jaw, Qu'Appelle, and Rosthern ridings.

The riding was abolished in 1966 when it was redistributed into Moose Jaw, Regina East and Regina—Lake Centre ridings. It was re-created in 1987 from parts of Assiniboia, Humboldt—Lake Centre and Moose Jaw ridings. The electoral district was abolished in 1996 when it was redistributed into Blackstrap, Cypress Hills—Grasslands, Palliser and Regina—Arm River ridings.

== History ==
=== Historical boundaries ===
1952 representation order

1966 representation order (as Moose Jaw)

1976 representation order (as Moose Jaw)

1987 representation order

=== Members of Parliament ===
This riding has elected the following members of Parliament:

Parliament	Years	Member	Party
Lake Centre, Moose Jaw, Qu'Appelle, and Rosthern prior to 1953
22nd	1953–1957	Ross Thatcher	Co-operative Commonwealth
23rd	1957–1958	Scoop Lewry	Co-operative Commonwealth
24th	1958–1962	James Ernest Pascoe	Progressive Conservative
25th	1962–1963	James Ernest Pascoe	Progressive Conservative
26th	1963–1965	James Ernest Pascoe	Progressive Conservative
27th	1965–1968	James Ernest Pascoe	Progressive Conservative
Moose Jaw, Assiniboia, and Humboldt—Lake Centre from 1968 to 1988
34th	1988–1993	Rod Laporte	New Democratic
35th	1993–1997	Allan Kerpan	Reform
Blackstrap, Cypress Hills—Grasslands, Palliser and Regina—Lumsden—Lake Centre from 1997 to present

== Election results ==
=== 1953–1968 ===
1953 Canadian federal election
Party	Candidate	Votes
Co-operative Commonwealth	Ross Thatcher	12,436
Liberal	James Lawrence Gemmell	6,021
Progressive Conservative	James Ernest Pascoe	4,480
Labor–Progressive	Frederick Nelson Clarke	792

1957 Canadian federal election
Party	Candidate	Votes
Co-operative Commonwealth	Louis Harrington Lewry	9,834
Progressive Conservative	James Ernest Pascoe	9,455
Liberal	Richard Neild Lillico	6,876
Social Credit	Martin Kelln	2,740

1958 Canadian federal election
Party	Candidate	Votes
Progressive Conservative	James Ernest Pascoe	18,736
Co-operative Commonwealth	Louis Harrington Lewry	8,535
Liberal	Jim De Rosenroll	4,030
Independent	W. Elvy Rogers	146

1962 Canadian federal election
Party	Candidate	Votes
Progressive Conservative	James Ernest Pascoe	19,456
New Democratic	Carl Wells	8,347
Liberal	Harvey D. Ross	7,924
Social Credit	Ed Chamberlin	1,720

1963 Canadian federal election
Party	Candidate	Votes
Progressive Conservative	James Ernest Pascoe	20,958
Liberal	Ted Pudden	8,283
New Democratic	Carl Wells	7,439
Social Credit	Ed Chamberlin	1,581

1965 Canadian federal election
Party	Candidate	Votes
Progressive Conservative	James Ernest Pascoe	18,087
New Democratic	Ken Fowler	10,495
Liberal	Bill Clarke	10,332
Social Credit	Alma Leech	977

=== 1988–1997 ===
1988 Canadian federal election
Party	Candidate	Votes
New Democratic	Rod Laporte	15,916
Progressive Conservative	Bill Gottselig	15,508
Liberal	Linda Boxall	5,980
Confederation of Regions	Edwin W. Appenheimer	287

1993 Canadian federal election
Party	Candidate	Votes
Reform	Allan Kerpan	10,432
New Democratic	Rod Laporte	10,122
Liberal	John Morris	9,354
Progressive Conservative	Bill Gottselig	4,204
Natural Law	Jack Heilman	158
Canada Party	Walton Eddy	117

== See also ==
- List of Canadian electoral districts
- Historical federal electoral districts of Canada
