= Lemsford Ferry =

Cable ferry in Saskatchewan, Canada

Coordinates: 51.0241°N 109.1329°W

The Lemsford Ferry is a cable ferry in the Canadian province of Saskatchewan. The ferry carries Highway 649 across the South Saskatchewan River at Lemsford. Lemsford Ferry Regional Park, which closed at the end of 2019, is located near the ferry.

The ferry is operated by the Saskatchewan Ministry of Highways and Infrastructure and is free of toll. The ferry operates only while the river is ice free, typically from mid April to mid November. During this time, the ferry runs on demand from 7:00 AM CST to midnight. The ferry is 16.7 metres (55 ft) long, 6.7 metres (22 ft) wide, and had a load limit of 18.5 tonnes (18.2 long tons; 20.4 short tons). The capacity of the ferry is six cars.

The ferry carries approximately 10,000 vehicles a year.

== See also ==
- List of crossings of the South Saskatchewan River
