= Swift Current—Maple Creek =

Former federal electoral district in Saskatchewan, Canada

Swift Current—Maple Creek (previously known as Swift Current) was a federal electoral district in Saskatchewan, Canada, that was represented in the House of Commons of Canada from 1917 to 1988. This riding was created in 1914 as "Swift Current" from parts of Moose Jaw riding. The name of the electoral district was changed to "Swift Current—Maple Creek" in 1953.

The electoral district was abolished in 1987 when it was merged into Swift Current—Maple Creek—Assiniboia riding.

== Members of Parliament ==
This riding elected the following members of Parliament:

1. Ira Eugene Argue, Unionist (1917–1921)
2. Arthur John Lewis, Progressive (1921–1925)
3. Charles Edward Bothwell, Liberal (1925–1940)
4. Roy Theodore Graham, Liberal (1940–1945)
5. Thomas J. Bentley, Co-operative Commonwealth Federation (1945–1949)
6. Harry B. Whiteside, Liberal (1949–1953)
7. Irvin Studer, Liberal (1953–1958)
8. Jack McIntosh, Progressive Conservative (1958–1972)
9. Frank Hamilton, Progressive Conservative (1972–1984)
10. Geoff Wilson, Progressive Conservative (1984–1988)

== Election results ==
1917 Canadian federal election
Party	Candidate	Votes
Government (Unionist)	Ira Eugene Argue	7,703
Opposition (Laurier Liberals)	Michael James Reilly	3,931

1921 Canadian federal election
Party	Candidate	Votes
Progressive	Arthur John Lewis	9,848
Liberal	William P. MacLachlan	4,223
Conservative	Ira Eugene Argue	2,158

1925 Canadian federal election
Party	Candidate	Votes
Liberal	Charles Edward Bothwell	4,555
Progressive	Arthur John Lewis	3,668

1926 Canadian federal election
Party	Candidate	Votes
Liberal	Charles Edward Bothwell	5,788
Progressive	Arthur John Lewis	3,094
Conservative	Archibald Livingston	2,097

1930 Canadian federal election
Party	Candidate	Votes
Liberal	Charles Edward Bothwell	6,382
Conservative	Oscar M. Irwin	5,456
Farmer–Labour	Joseph Gilbert Laycock	2,091

1935 Canadian federal election
Party	Candidate	Votes
Liberal	Charles Edward Bothwell	5,682
Social Credit	Oliver Reid	3,556
Co-operative Commonwealth	Joseph Gilbert Laycock	2,927
Conservative	James Oswald Begg	2,536

1940 Canadian federal election
Party	Candidate	Votes
Liberal	Roy Theodore Graham	6,042
Co-operative Commonwealth	Henry Peter Thiessen	5,507
National Government	James P. Whyte	3,965

1945 Canadian federal election
Party	Candidate	Votes
Co-operative Commonwealth	Thomas John Bentley	7,813
Liberal	Roy Theodore Graham	6,169
Progressive Conservative	Genevieve Ethel Begg	2,537

1949 Canadian federal election
Party	Candidate	Votes
Liberal	Harry B. Whiteside	7,595
Co-operative Commonwealth	Thomas John Bentley	6,776
Progressive Conservative	John Kinchen Rosa	1,761

1953 Canadian federal election
Party	Candidate	Votes
Liberal	Irvin Studer	10,088
Co-operative Commonwealth	William Kenneth Rutherford	9,947
Social Credit	John Wilfred MacPherson	1,471
Progressive Conservative	John Wilkinson	1,432
Labor–Progressive	Frederick James Schofield	392

1957 Canadian federal election
Party	Candidate	Votes
Liberal	Irvin Studer	9,639
Co-operative Commonwealth	Harry Gibbs	8,930
Progressive Conservative	John K. Rosa	4,255
Social Credit	Raymond G. Miller	3,028

1958 Canadian federal election
Party	Candidate	Votes
Progressive Conservative	Jack McIntosh	11,618
Liberal	Irvin Studer	6,932
Co-operative Commonwealth	Arthur H. Johnson	6,921
Labor–Progressive	Fred J. Schofield	196

1962 Canadian federal election
Party	Candidate	Votes
Progressive Conservative	Jack McIntosh	10,814
Liberal	Irvin Studer	7,809
New Democratic	Art Johnson	6,009
Social Credit	Ted Kouri	1,711

1963 Canadian federal election
Party	Candidate	Votes
Progressive Conservative	Jack McIntosh	12,963
Liberal	Irvin Studer	7,058
New Democratic	Art Johnson	4,917
Social Credit	Ted Kouri	1,444

1965 Canadian federal election
Party	Candidate	Votes
Progressive Conservative	Jack McIntosh	11,227
Liberal	J. Fred Polley	6,700
New Democratic	Bev Currie	6,238
Social Credit	Ted Kouri	923

1968 Canadian federal election
Party	Candidate	Votes
Progressive Conservative	Jack McIntosh	11,237
New Democratic	Bev Currie	10,207
Liberal	Donald J. Strath	6,930

1972 Canadian federal election
Party	Candidate	Votes
Progressive Conservative	Frank Fletcher Hamilton	11,500
New Democratic	Merv Johnson	9,275
Liberal	George Leith	7,165
Social Credit	Ted Kouri	584
Independent	Charles Kieling	138

1974 Canadian federal election
Party	Candidate	Votes
Progressive Conservative	Frank Fletcher Hamilton	11,336
Liberal	George Leith	8,091
New Democratic	Ed Wallace	7,477
Social Credit	Isaac Klaassen	390

1979 Canadian federal election
Party	Candidate	Votes
Progressive Conservative	Frank Fletcher Hamilton	15,213
New Democratic	Ron Gates	8,720
Liberal	Gene Maurice	5,171

1980 Canadian federal election
Party	Candidate	Votes
Progressive Conservative	Frank Fletcher Hamilton	12,917
New Democratic	Ron Gates	8,338
Liberal	Gene Maurice	5,673

1984 Canadian federal election
Party	Candidate	Votes
Progressive Conservative	Geoff Wilson	14,590
New Democratic	Don Beveridge	8,196
Liberal	Jack Wiebe	5,967
Confederation of Regions	Lorne Larson	582

== See also ==
- List of Canadian electoral districts
- Historical federal electoral districts of Canada
