= William Addison Beynon =

Canadian politician

William Addison Beynon KC

Member of the Canadian Parliament for Moose Jaw
- In office 1930–1935
- Preceded by: John Gordon Ross
- Succeeded by: John Gordon Ross

Personal details
- Born: 21 December 1877 King Township, Ontario, Canada
- Died: 8 June 1968 (aged 90) Winnipeg, Manitoba, Canada
- Party: Conservative Party
- Occupation: barrister

William John Addison Beynon, KC (21 December 1877 – 8 June 1968) was a Canadian politician and barrister. He was elected to the House of Commons of Canada in 1930 as a Member of the Conservative Party to represent the riding of Moose Jaw. He was defeated in the 1935 election. He died at his home in Winnipeg in 1968.
