= J. Ernest Pascoe =

Canadian politician

Official 1966 portrait

James Ernest Pascoe (August 7, 1900 – November 15, 1972) was a Canadian politician, farmer and journalist.

Born in Moose Jaw, Saskatchewan, the son of James Pascoe and Mary Olton, he was unsuccessful in his first two bids for the position of Member of Parliament for Moose Jaw—Lake Centre, Pascoe defeated Louis H. Lewry in the 1958 federal election as a Progressive Conservative Party candidate. He was re-elected easily until the 1968 election, when he was defeated narrowly in the newly named riding of Moose Jaw by New Democratic Party candidate John Skoberg.

He later served as mayor of the City of Moose Jaw from 1971 to 1972.

Parliament of Canada
Preceded by Louis Harrington Lewry	Member of Parliament for Moose Jaw—Lake Centre; 1958–1968	Succeeded by The electoral district was abolished in 1966.
