= Lee Morrison =

Canadian politician (1932–2026)

Member of Parliament for Cypress Hills—Grasslands
- In office 1997–2000
- Succeeded by: Geoff Wilson

Member of Parliament for Swift Current—Maple Creek—Assiniboia
- In office 1993–1997
- Preceded by: Geoff Wilson

Personal details
- Born: 6 March 1932 Vidora, Saskatchewan, Canada
- Died: 15 March 2026 (aged 94) Calgary, Alberta, Canada
- Party: Reform Party of Canada
- Occupation: Geologist; farmer; geological engineer

Lee Glen Morrison (6 March 1932 – 15 March 2026) was a Canadian politician. He was a member of the House of Commons of Canada from 1993 to 2000.

== Life and career ==
Morrison was born in Vidora, Saskatchewan, on 6 March 1932. He was first elected in the Swift Current—Maple Creek—Assiniboia electoral district in the 1993 federal election. After realignment of riding boundaries, he was re-elected in the Cypress Hills—Grasslands electoral district in the 1997 federal election. Morrison was a member of the Reform party, later renamed the Canadian Alliance. After serving in the 35th and 36th Canadian Parliaments, he did not seek a third term of office, leaving federal politics as of the 2000 federal election.

Morrison died in Calgary on 15 March 2026, at the age of 94.

== Electoral record ==
1997 Canadian federal election: Cypress Hills—Grasslands
Party	Candidate	Votes	%	±%	Expenditures
Reform	Lee Morrison	16,439	49.1	–	$36,935
Liberal	Ron Gleim	7,130	21.3	–	$52,705
New Democratic	Dean Smith	6,490	19.4	–	$36,138
Progressive Conservative	Marcel Fournier	3,421	10.2	–	$9,917
Total valid votes		33,480	100		–
Total rejected ballots		105	0.3		
Turnout		33,585	67.4		
