= Saskatchewan Highway 48 =

Provincial highway in Saskatchewan, Canada

Highway 48
- Highway 48 highlighted in red
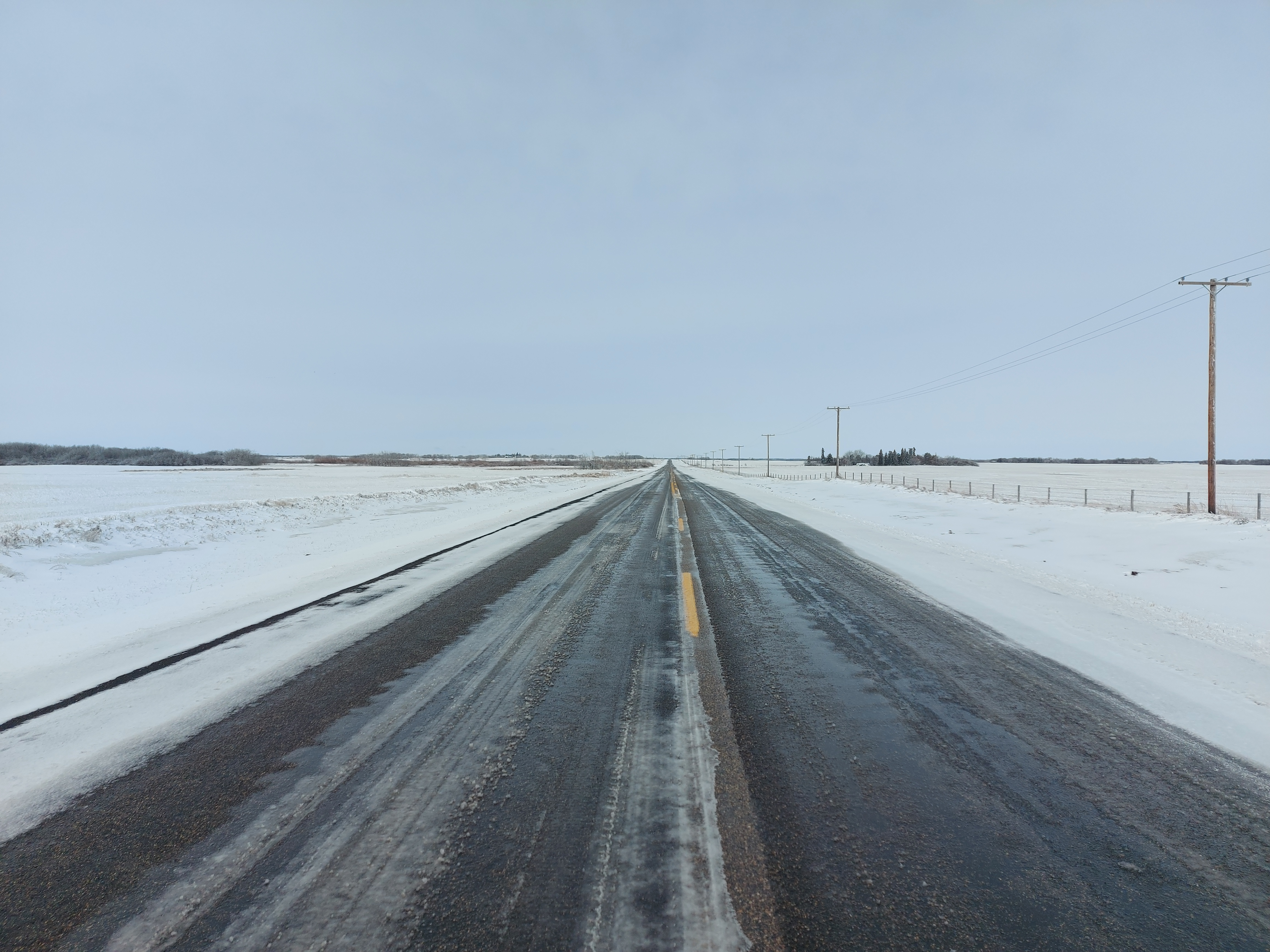
- Highway 48 west of Fairlight

Route information
- Maintained by Ministry of Highways and Infrastructure
- Length: 237.8 km (147.8 mi)
- Existed: 1976–present

Major junctions
- West end: Highway 1 (TCH) at White City
- Highway 35 between Vibank and Odessa; Highway 47 near Glenavon; Highway 9 near Moose Mountain; Highway 8 at Fairlight
- East end: PR 257 at Manitoba border near Maryfield

Location
- Country: Canada
- Province: Saskatchewan
- Rural municipalities: Edenwold, South Qu'Appelle, Lajord, Francis, Montmartre, Chester, Kingsley, Hazelwood, Wawken, Walpole, Maryfield

Highway system
- Provincial highways in Saskatchewan
← Highway 47	→ Highway 49

Highway 48 is a provincial highway in the Canadian province of Saskatchewan. The highway runs from the Trans-Canada Highway at White City east to the Manitoba — Saskatchewan border. It is about 238 kilometres (148 mi) long. Highway 48 was originally numbered as Highway 16 until the mid-1970s.

== History ==
Highway 48 was known as Highway 16 until 1976. It was renumbered 48 when the Yellowhead Highway was designated as Highway 16 throughout the province.

The original Highway 48 was located in south-western Saskatchewan, travelling from the Willow Creek Border Crossing to Highway 13 at Govenlock. The route was renumbered to Highway 348 in the 1960s before becoming part of Highway 21 in the 1970s.

== Route description ==
Highway 48 begins at Highway 1 (the Trans-Canada Highway) about 10 kilometres (6.2 mi) east of Regina at White City. It travels in an easterly direction towards Manitoba where it becomes Provincial Road 257. Major highways it intersects include 35, 47, 9, and 8.

Beginning at a diamond interchange with Highway 1, Highway 48 travels south through White City. From the south side of White City, it turns south-east for about 10 kilometres (6.2 mi) before turning due east at the junction with Old 16 Road. From that junction, Old 16 Road heads west to Highway 33 while Highway 48 carries on eastward for a further 9 kilometres (5.6 mi) before resuming a south-easterly direction near Davin. Carrying on from Davin, Highway 48 provides access to the communities of Vibank, Odessa, Kendal, Montmartre, Candiac, and Glenavon. The junction with Highway 35 is between Vibank and Odessa. Highway 48 crosses the Chapleau Lakes, which is the source of Moose Mountain Creek, between Kendal and Montmartre.

East of Glenavon, Highway 48 intersects with Highway 47 before continuing south-east to Highway 9. Communities along that stretch include Peebles, Windthorst, Kipling, and Kennedy. East of Kennedy, Highway 48 turns south and begins a 13-kilometre (8.1 mi) concurrency with Highway 9. At the northern slopes of the Moose Mountain Upland, the concurrency ends with Highway 9 continuing south into Moose Mountain Provincial Park and Highway 48 turning east towards Wawota. From Wawota, the highway passes through Fairlight, Walpole, and Maryfield and intersects Highway 8 before ending at the Manitoba border. The road carries on into Manitoba as Provincial Road 257 where it crosses Pipestone Creek and provides access to Kola. PR 257 eventually meets up with the Trans-Canada Highway at Virden, Manitoba.

== Major intersections ==
Form west to east:

Rural municipality	Location	km	mi	Destinations	Notes
Edenwold No. 158	White City	0.0	0.0	Highway 1 (TCH) – Regina, Winnipeg	Interchange; Highway 1 exit 217
Edenwold No. 158	Jameson	7.7	4.8	Highway 622 – Balgonie, Kronau	
South Qu'Appelle No. 157		16.3	10.1	Highway 621 – Lajord	
Lajord No. 128	Davin	22.3	13.9	Highway 620 north – McLean	West end of Highway 620 concurrency
Francis No. 127		29.5	18.3	Highway 620 south – Sedley	East end of Highway 620 concurrency
Francis No. 127	Vibank	34.0	21.1		centre
Francis No. 127		40.3	25.0	Highway 35 – Qu'Appelle, Francis, Weyburn	
Francis No. 127	Odessa	46.3	28.8		centre
Montmartre No. 126	Kendal	59.5	37.0	Highway 619 north – Indian Head	
Montmartre No. 126	Montmartre	71.7	44.6	Highway 606 north – Sintaluta	West end of Highway 606 concurrency
Montmartre No. 126	Montmartre	72.5	45.0	Highway 606 south – Fillmore	East end of Highway 606 concurrency
Montmartre No. 126		84.7	52.6	Highway 617 north – Wolseley	West of Candiac; west end of Highway 617 concurrency
Montmartre No. 126	Glenavon	94.3	58.6	Highway 617 south	East end of Highway 617 concurrency
Chester No. 125		103.4	64.2	Highway 47 – Grenfell, Stoughton, Estevan	
Chester No. 125	Peebles	110.4	68.6	Highway 616 north – Grenfell	West end of Highway 616 concurrency
Chester No. 125		115.9	72.0	Highway 616 south	West of Windthorst; east end of Highway 616 concurrency
Kingsley No. 124	Kipling	135.7	84.3	Highway 605 / Highway 709 east – Broadview	
Hazelwood No. 94	No major junctions				
Wawken No. 93		161.1	100.1	Highway 9 north – Whitewood, Yorkton	East of Kennedy; Highway 48 branches south; west end of Highway 9 concurrency
Wawken No. 93		171.1	106.3	Highway 711 west	
Wawken No. 93		174.4	108.4	Highway 9 south – Moose Mountain Provincial Park, Carlyle	Highway 48 branches east; east end of Highway 9 concurrency
Wawken No. 93	Wawota	192.3	119.5	Highway 603 south	
Walpole No. 92		201.7	125.3	Highway 601 north – Kelso, Wapella	West end of Highway 601 concurrency
Walpole No. 92		202.5	125.8	Highway 601 south – Parkman	East end of Highway 601 concurrency
Maryfield No. 91	Fairlight	219.0	136.1	Highway 8 – Moosomin, Redvers	
Maryfield No. 91	Maryfield	229.5	142.6	Highway 600 – Fleming	
Maryfield No. 91		237.8	147.8	PR 257 east – Virden	Continuation into Manitoba
1.000 mi = 1.609 km; 1.000 km = 0.621 mi: Concurrency terminus; Route transition

== See also ==
- Transportation in Saskatchewan
- Roads in Saskatchewan
