= Montmartre, Saskatchewan =

Village in Saskatchewan, Canada

Montmartre
- Village
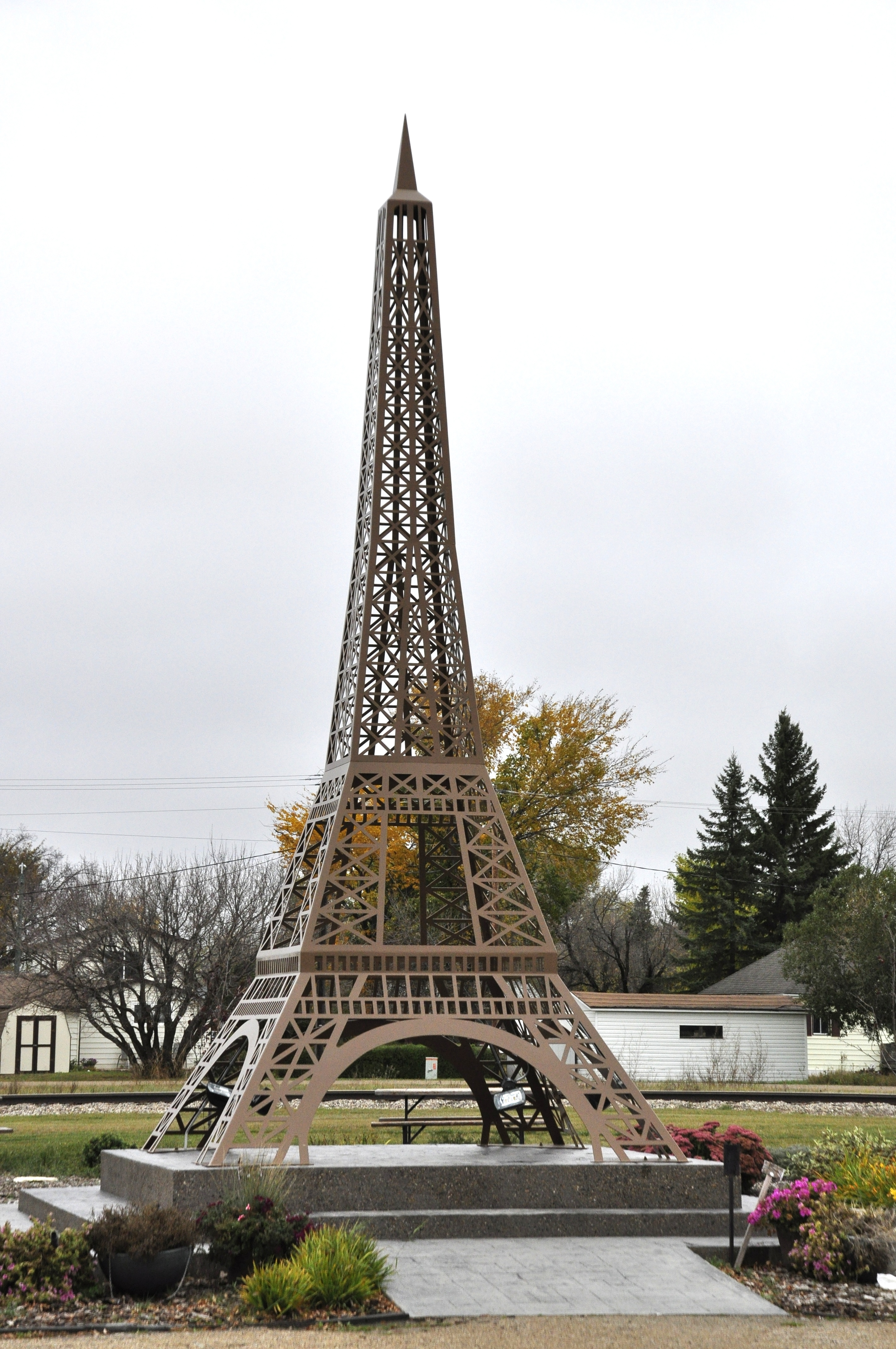
- Motto: Paris of the Prairies
- Location of Montmartre in Saskatchewan Montmartre (Canada)
- Coordinates: 50.213°N 103.415°W
- Country: Canada
- Province: Saskatchewan
- Region: Southeast
- Census division: 6
- Rural municipality: Montmartre No. 126
- Post office Founded: 1894

Government
  - Mayor: Robert Chittenden
  - Administrator: Dale Brenner
  - Governing body: Montmartre Village Council

Area
  - Total: 1.70 km^{2} (0.66 sq mi)

Population (2016)
  - Total: 490
  - Density: 288/km^{2} (750/sq mi)
- Time zone: CST
- Postal code: S0G 3M0
- Area code: 306
- Highways: Highway 48
- Website: Montmartre website

Montmartre (/ˈmoʊmɑːrt/ MOH-mart) (2016 population: 490) is a village in the Canadian province of Saskatchewan within the Rural Municipality of Montmartre No. 126 and Census Division No. 6. It is 91 kilometres (57 mi) east of the city of Regina on Highway 48.

It is in the provincial electoral district of Moosomin and the federal electoral district Wascana.

== History ==
Montmartre incorporated as a village on October 19, 1908.

=== The colony of Montmartre ===
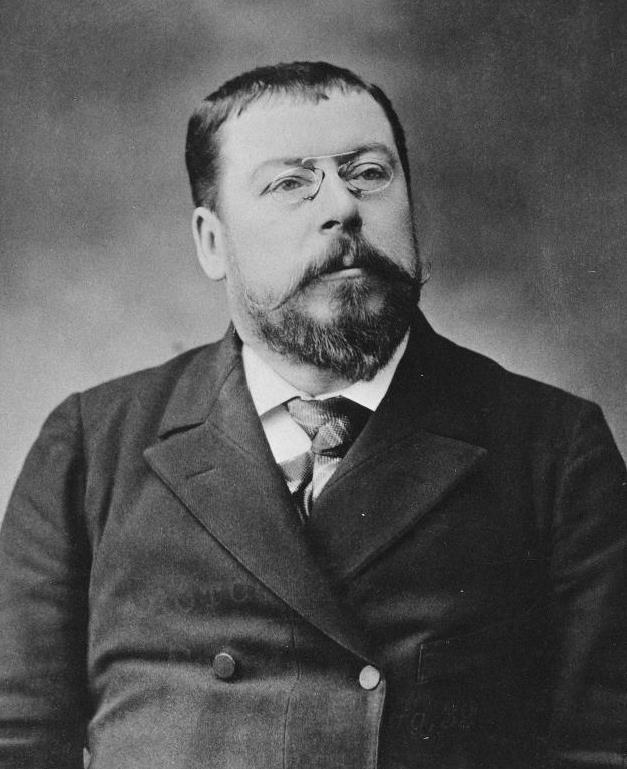
Pierre Foursin (1852-1916), president of the Foncier Society of Canada

In March 1893, wealthy French Catholic settlers by the names of Pierre Foursin (a private secretary to the Honourable Hector Fabre, the first Canadian High Commissioner to Paris), Armand Goupil (notary), Auguste and Albert-Léon Haymann (proprietors of a large jewellery store), Jean and André Chartier (university students) and Louis Gigot (brother-in-law of the Chartiers and an Engineer of Arts and Manufactors) decided to establish the colony of Montmartre. Together, they founded the Foncier Society of Canada "the Society," which was created to aid in colonization. After getting off the train at Wolseley, they travelled by horse and buggy southwest to SE 16-15-11 W2, which was a hilly area that eventually became the Montmartre colony. They named their new settlement "Montmartre" after their home in Montmartre, France. In March 1893, after they established land, Foursin, Goupil, Haymann and the Chartiers set out for new settlements in the area while Gigot and Haymann remained in Paris to promote colonization.

=== The Foncier Society of Canada's promises ===
Gigot and Haymann's promoting Montmartre was successful as they described it as a place with excellent farmland, woods, lakes, rivers, and abundant game. Because most colonists coming to Montmartre were office workers and bureaucrats with no farming experience, to help colonists integrate, the Society made promises that would help colonists become farmers with the help of a hired mentor, Onesime Tourigny. Throughout this process, the Society made more agreements which promised to: provide colonists with railroad/steamship fares, cover the cost of registering 160 acres of land (which would be chosen by the Society), a furnished log cabin, food, animals, farm equipment, insurance expenses, and mortgages until the colonists became self-sufficient.

=== First families ===
The first family living in Montmartre was that of Auguste M.D. de Trémaudan (the only family who was brought by the Foncier Society) who brought his wife Jeanne Marie and children from France. The second family was that of Mr. Berneau, who brought his wife, 18-year-old son and baby boy (who later died after their arrival in Canada). On June 1, 1893, both families arrived in their new home of Montmartre where they temporarily lived in sod-covered tepee structures. Eventually, as the Society promised, houses were built for colonists in the form of a village. In August 1893, as another fulfillment of the Society's promises, each colonist was assigned a quarter section of land. Later that year, on November 10, 1893, Jeanne Simonin was born, marking the first birth in Montmartre.

=== Hardships of colonists ===
Their first year on Canadian soil, European settlers suffered many hardships. An early frost in August 1893 froze their first potato crop, and the well that men from Wolseley had been hired to dig was abandoned because there was no sign of water. Furthermore, on October 31, 1893, a prairie fire swept across Montmartre. Although no lives, buildings, or animals were lost, the fire took most of their belongings and the feed for their animals. Later that year, Louis Fombeur died from pneumonia during his quest for straw for his cattle, marking the first death in Montmartre. The struggles continued throughout that winter as settlers and their livestock were obligated to drink slough water or melted snow.

=== Early 20th-century settlers ===
In 1898, people started emigrating from eastern Canada. Although the French settlers remained the majority in Montmartre, by 1905, English, Irish, Polish and German families joined the mix. A 1901 census read that there were 20 houses with 22 families, made up of 95 people. The origins of these people were: 1 English, 80 French, 10 Belgian, 1 Swiss and 3 Métis.

=== World War I ===
Young men from Montmartre enlisted to serve with the Saskatchewan Regiment, 214th Battalion, in England and France during World War I.

=== 1920 to World War II ===
At the beginning of the Roaring Twenties, it had been just over ten years since incorporation, and the village continued to grow, change, and improve. By 1921, the population had grown to 287 in the village and 2,144 in the rural municipality (RM). The growth and change the community experienced during this period was especially evident in the business community with many stores on Grand Avenue (known as Central Avenue today) and Railway Street (known as First Street today) opening, moving or expanding. With the community expanding, a housing shortage was experienced.

Access to the rest of the world began to improve in the 1920s as well. In 1922, Saskatchewan got its first radio station – CKCK Regina. In November, a radio was installed in the village hall to allow people to listen to concerts. Soon after, people started installing radios in their homes.

Improvements to the village water supply were carried out in this period. They drilled a well, built a reservoir, and installed an engine and pump, and then people would transport their water home themselves. In 1923, 1,200 lineal feet of cement walk were also built that took the place of the run-down boardwalks. Electrical lighting came to the village as well. Street lights, rink lights, businesses and homes were supplied with electrical light.

Articles from The Morning Leader newspaper in 1923 indicate that there were good rains and that there was "every sign of a bumper crop." 1928 was the best year for crops of the century up to that time. This prosperity allowed people to spend money on improving the community, and improving their farming operations with equipment. During the years of good crops of the '20s, land was being taken up at a brisk rate, and this caused the land to go up by $2 per acre.

This prosperous era of improvement and change came to a halt with the Great Depression. The price of a bushel of wheat went from $1.15 in 1929 to 30 cents in 1933.

Along with the stock market crash, crops failed due to rust and drought. In 1930, over 1,000 acres of wheat in the district were not worth cutting due to rust. In most years, whatever crops did emerge were often damaged from wind. Fallow practices were implemented to mitigate the damage, but these factors combined to create severe dust storms. In 1938, the crop yield was only two bushels per acre, and only rose to four bushels per acre the following year.

The Saskatchewan Relief Commission helped people survive these years of hardship. Province-wide, the Commission spent $31.5 million, and a committee was formed to manage relief efforts in each municipality. People survived through helping one another as well. Those in areas getting by would help those more in need. Neighbouring towns provided food and clothing to one another when in need, and aid came from Eastern Canada on the railway. There was one incident reported in the Leader Post on March 13, 1939, where two tons of relief hay were stolen. Although incidents like this did happen, this period helped the citizens realize the importance of community and cooperation in order to survive difficult times.

Out of the need for cooperation and community came the organization of cooperatives. The Montmartre Co-op began in 1938 with 40 members, and grew to 104 members by 1941. In the beginning it sold gasoline and kerosene, but by 1942 the Co-op purchased the local food store as well.

By 1941, conditions finally improved drastically. The wheat harvest increased to 21 bushels/acre from 5 bushels/acre in 1940. Throughout the rest of the 1940s, this stayed fairly steady.

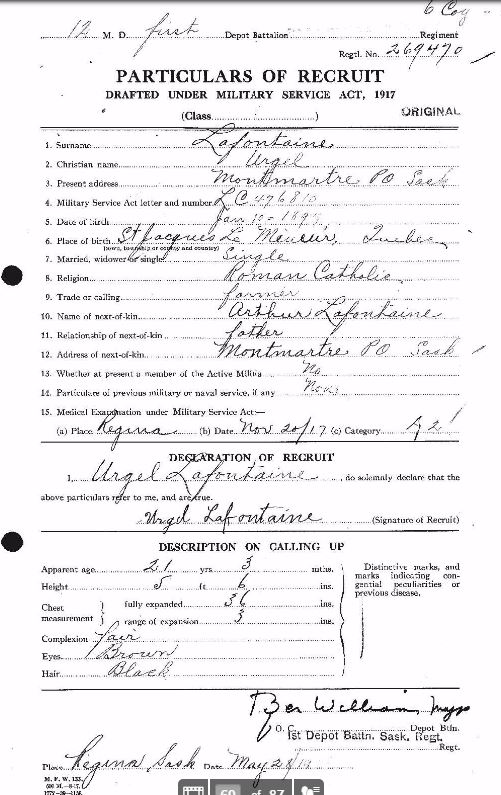
Military enlistment document for WW1

=== World War II ===
Many young men and a few young women enlisted to serve Canada in Europe. The first man to enlist from Montmartre was Eugene Breton in May 1938. Committees were established to provide support to troops. For example, the Rehabilitation Committee was made up of businessmen who aimed to help returning soldiers financially. The Victory Bond Committee went through villages and the Rural Municipality selling war bonds. The Red Cross Committee was established to raise funds and create care packages to send to troops overseas.

Rations were instituted in Montmartre, including sugar, butter, meat, gasoline, and farm implements. With the men gone, this left the women, children, and seniors to take on their duties, which was particularly difficult on farms. The war was over in Europe on May 8, 1945. The May 16, 1945, edition of the Wolseley News reported Victory Day in Montmartre began with mass led by Father Leon Savoie, and at 2 pm there was a parade through every street in the village ending at Paul's Hall. 1,200 people participated, led by a car bearing the flags of all Allied nations. Picture shows were shown throughout the day, and a mock trial was carried out in which indictments against a life-size effigy of Adolf Hitler were read. After the mock trial, the effigy was carried to the Canadian National Railway grounds and hoisted on top of a huge bonfire. This was followed by fireworks and a dance in the hall. A parade also followed Victory Day in Japan on August 15, 1945. In the afternoon, a train carrying 1,500 returning soldiers from overseas, who were given 2,400 cigarettes from the young people of the village.

==== Montmartre casualties ====
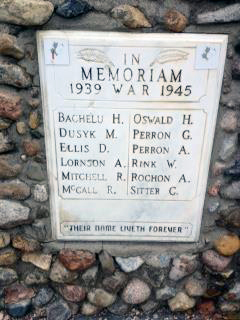

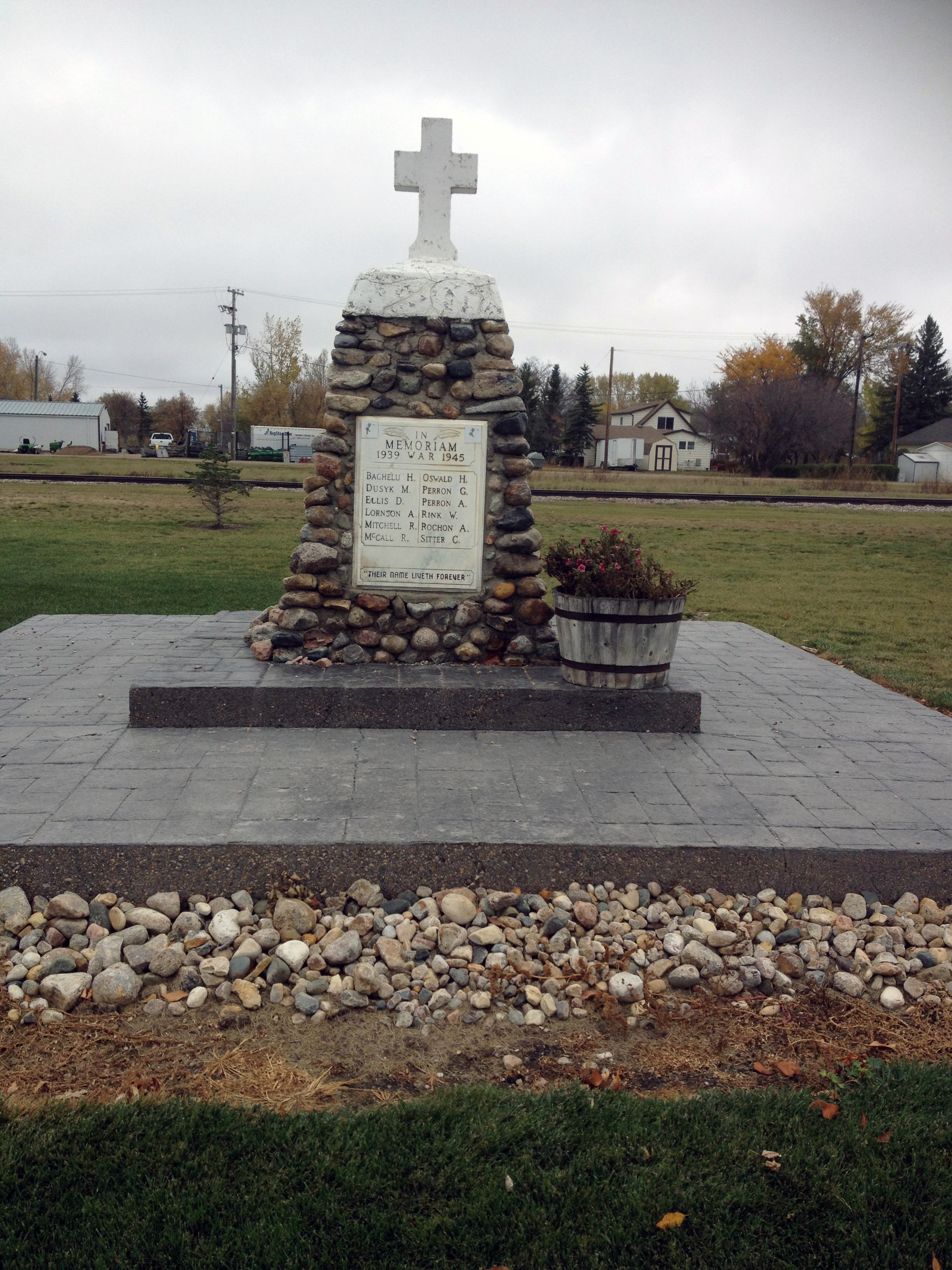
Cenotaph in Montmartre

A number of residents of the town served as well as died in World War II. Michael Dusyk, of Montmartre was killed on September 27, 1944, and is buried at Gradara war cemetery, Pesaro, Italy. He was from a homestead southeast of Montmartre. Dusyk Lake, north east of Uranium City is named in his honour. Joseph Perron was killed on October 4, 1944, and is buried at Becklingen War Cemetery near Soltau, Germany. Perron Lake southeast of Fontaine Lake is named in his honour. Gaetan Perron died on April 18, 1945, and is buried at Holten Canadian War Cemetery, Netherlands. Perron Island in Oliver Lake is named in his honour. Others killed include Donald Hollowell, Spencer W. Hollowell, Rex Mitchell, Antoine Perron, and Aldon Joseph Rochon.

=== 1945-1960 ===
During this time Montmartre, which had been hit hard by drought and the Great Depression, began to recover. This was evident in the expansion of many of the town's local businesses.

In 1942, the Montmartre Cooperative boasted around 206 members and absorbed a local hardware store. The Co-op board was expanded from six directors to nine. The Co-op growth continued during this time when in 1945 it acquired a lumber yard, which was open until 1991. The expansion continued in 1948 when the Co-op absorbed a local general store. In 1952, the Montmartre Cooperative had total sales of $393,845.78; this was despite the fact that the cooperative at this time only had total assets of around $203,946.34.

The local credit union as well grew and prospered during this time. In 1952, the credit union had 492 members and had capital of $301,508.80.

Businesses were not the only institutions that changed during this time. On November 5, 1948, the village bought a private residence and began the process of turning it into a hospital. This was a major step forward for the village as prior patients in need of hospitalization were transported to Regina. The next year, 1949, rate payers from Montmartre, as well as Kendal and Rural Municipality 126 voted in favour of establishing the hospital. As a result of this vote a council of five members was established with legislative powers to govern the hospital. In 1952 the congregation of Filles de la Croix took up charge of the hospital.

In 1950–52, St Peter and Paul Ukrainian Catholic Church was built.

=== Construction of the Cenotaph ===
In honour of those who served Canada during the war the Montmartre Cenotaph was built in 1946; it was officially dedicated on November 11, 1946. The Cenotaph was a project undertaken by the Soldiers Welfare Committee, in association with the British Empire Service League. Locals organized the collection of materials and workers for the project.

In 1947, the Montmartre Legion Branch 279 agreed to contribute $25 for upkeep and maintenance. At this time the legion as well bought two wreaths, a flag and a flag pole. In 1959, the legion installed a permanent flag pole at the site. In 1970, the legion decided to undertake a beautification project. This project took down the white picket fence, and planted flowers every spring.

For the village's 100th anniversary in July 2009, bright red poppies were set all around the foundation of the cenotaph.

Each year at the annual Remembrance Day ceremony the names on the plaque are read.

=== 1960s ===
During the 1960s in Montmartre, there were several changes to the businesses in the village. The hotel was modernized and a beverage room was added where the women were allowed in for the first time. The total cost of renovations were $40,000. Also during the 1960s, a dozen new homes were built, a Co-op service station and supermarket were built and a new credit union was erected in 1966. The village continued to grow with another important change that was installed: the addition to the elementary school in 1967. A much-needed addition was added to the village's school because of the recent surrounding schools closing and the increase of attendance.

=== 1970s ===
Facilities increased in the town in this decade: a new library, police barracks, a regional park, a golf course, and low rental housing units. Only a decade later since the school was updated, a gym was also added to the recently extended school. The library was built in 1971 and the ribbon was cut by Ken Stoudt, the village overseer. The village also installed street lights, additional water and sewer mains, and a street numbering system, traffic signs were changed to the metric system in 1977, and most notably, the telephone system was upgraded. In Montmartre, Candiac, and Kendal the telephone service was changed from a switchboard with a local telephone operator, to the new dial service. This decade was significant due to many upgrades and the town slowly became more advanced with these installments.

=== 1980s ===
The next renovations occurred in the '80s when the New Holland shop opened, owned by Murray and Laurencia Hewalo. The Marshall Wells Store was built, as well as Dusyk Enterprises, John's Air Conditioning and Refrigeration, Yvette's Hair Care, and Montmartre Mini-Mart. New home businesses also opened such as Jury's Shoe and Leather Repair and Montmartre Electric. The swimming pool change-house burned down but was rebuilt, and the long-established Sacred Heart Convent closed. In addition to the new businesses and some buildings being burned, there were many devastating tornadoes in the municipality, especially in 1989. The first tornado was on the Carry The Kettle Reserve and fortunately there were no fatalities or houses ruined, but trees were uprooted.

=== 1990s ===
During the 1990s many people in the village turned towards the environment and making the village look beautiful as a whole. People were encouraged to recycle and the first Loraas bin arrived. More environmental changes happened, such as the Co-op removing their underground tanks and replaced with above ground tanks. Non-smoking rules were put at public buildings, streets were paved, and flowers and trees were planted in the village. A new health centre was officially opened in July 1991, and over 250 people attended the opening ceremony. The old hospital was demolished in May 1992, and the village bought the land and built a six-unit housing complex, called The Manor.

The village went above and beyond cleaning up their streets and properties, so they entered the Saskatchewan Communities in Bloom contest and won first place. They were awarded a plaque and a pine tree that is currently located at the centre Block 25, lot 18. The '90s were also seen as a decade where a significant change in farming practices occurred. More farmers took their summerfallow crops out of rotation and put them into crop production.

=== 2000s – present ===
From the early 2000s to the present, several events were celebrated. The village was proud to install welcome signs, and the Economic Development and Tourism Committee was formed in 2001. The Montmartre Farmers Market Corporation was created in 2003 and the Montmartre Pharmacist closed in 2003. During the same year, there were 22 oil wells located within the Rural Municipality of Montmartre. Prescriptions were and are now sent in from Indian Head. In 2006, the town grew in population when it welcomed over forty new families that moved to Montmartre. In 2008, the welcome signs were moved to grid 606 to welcome people coming into Montmartre from the north and south. Montmartre then celebrated its centennial in 2009 and twenty campsites were available at the park for the event. All the campsites were upgraded with water, sewer, and power.

== Demographics ==
Population history (1981–2016)
Year	Pop.	±%
1981	544	—
1986	510	−6.2%
1991	471	−7.6%
1996	485	+3.0%
2001	465	−4.1%
2006	413	−11.2%
2011	476	+15.3%
2016	490	+2.9%
Source: Statistics Canada via Saskatchewan Bureau of Statistics

In the 2021 Census of Population conducted by Statistics Canada, Montmartre had a population of 450 living in 210 of its 242 total private dwellings, a change of −8.2% from its 2016 population of 490. With a land area of 1.69 km^{2} (0.65 sq mi), it had a population density of 266.3/km^{2} (689.6/sq mi) in 2021.

In the 2016 Census of Population, the Village of Montmartre recorded a population of 490 living in 226 of its 248 total private dwellings, a 2.9% change from its 2011 population of 476. With a land area of 1.7 km^{2} (0.66 sq mi), it had a population density of 288.2/km^{2} (746.5/sq mi) in 2016.

=== Population characteristics ===
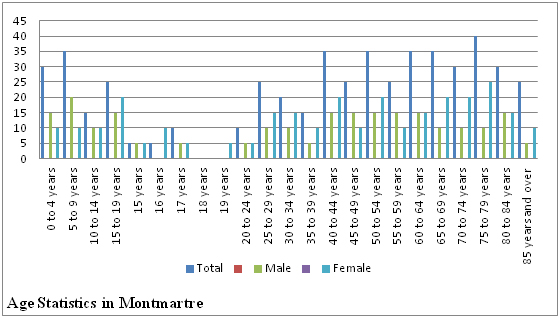
Age statistics in Montmartre 2011

Montmartre was founded in the District of Assiniboia of the North West Territories of Canada, an area that is today in the province of Saskatchewan. The first family who settled at Montmartre was the Auguste M.D. de Trémaudan family.

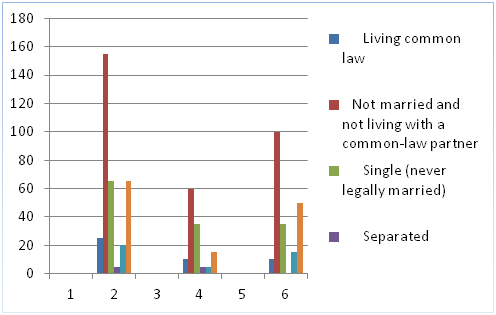
Marital status in Montmartre 2011

In 1893, the first small group that took up land in the district was the French Catholics. They came from France and chose to name their settlement Montmartre which means "mountain of the martyrs." Between 1893 and 1903 more French settlers, including French Canadians settled in Montmartre. Ukrainians, Poles, Germans, Scots, Irish, and English also settled at the district. In 1893, the population of the village were French and Ukrainian.

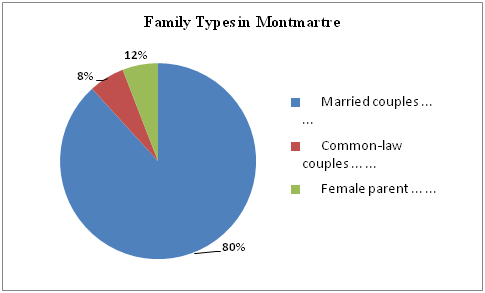
Family types in Montmartre 2011

In 1901, the Canadian Census in the district of Montmartre was listed as having 20 houses with 22 families and origins of these 95 people as: 1 English, 80 French, 10 Belgian, 1 Swiss and 3 Metis stepchildren.

The population of the village was 201 in 1911 and 395 by 1951:in 1966, Montmartre's population was 566.

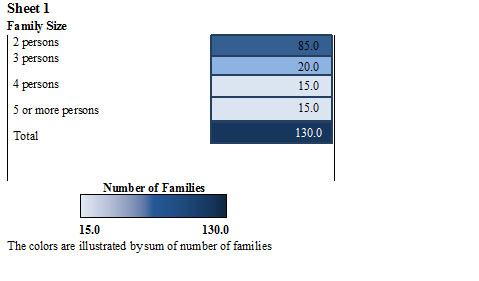
Family size in Montmartre 2011

According to the 2011 Census of Canada, the population of Montmartre and its municipal area is 476. This represents an increase of 15.3% from 2006 when the population was 413. There are a total of 218 private dwellings within Montmartre and its surroundings. The village has a population density of 0.3 per square kilometer in a land area of 1,047.83 square kilometers.

Montmartre has a median age population of 50.2, with 83% over the age of 15. Within Montmartre, males represent 47% of the population, while females account for 53%.

In Montmartre, the majority of the population are married or living with a common law partner. This group makes up 50% of the population. Married and not separated account for 44% of the population. Single residents account for 14% of the population and separated, divorced and widowed individuals make up 19% of the population.

There are 130 families in Montmartre, resulting in a total of 110 children from 0–25 years old. According to the 2011 Census of Canada, the average number of children still at home is 0.9.

=== Family and household characteristics ===
Common law couples account for 8% of the total number of census families in the village of Montmartre; female lone parents account for 12% while married couples account for 80% of the census families.

A majority of Montmartre residents speak English as their mother tongue (79%). 8.3% of the population identified French as their first official language while 11% speak both French and English. 4.2% speak German, 2.1% speak Polish while 4.2% speak Ukrainian.

Most people that settled in Montmartre are Christians, the majority of them being Catholic. Churches began springing up in the early 1900s.

== Geography ==
=== Climate ===
Similarly to the rest of the province, Montmartre's climate is characterized by short, warm summers and long, cold winters. On average, July is the warmest month with a mean temperature of 18.2 °C, according to the recordings taken at Indian Head, the nearest weather station to Montmartre. January is the coolest month in Montmartre with an average temperature recorded at −14.8 °C. In the summer months, the average daily highs range from low to mid twenties, with July being the warmest month at an average daily high of 25 °C. During the coolest of the winter months, the average low ranges from −17.3 °C to −20.1 °C. The highest temperature on record for the area is 42.8 °C, which was recorded on July 5, 1937. In contrast, the lowest temperature recorded in the area was −46.7 °C on February 1, 1893.

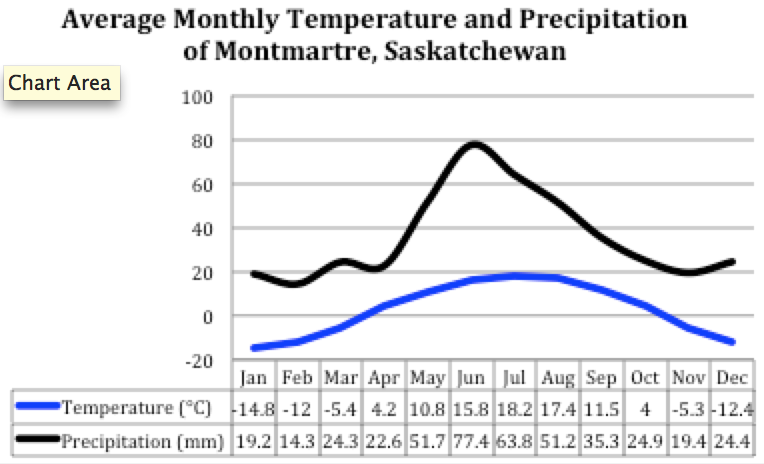
Temperature and precipitation of Montmartre, SK

The Aspen Parkland ecoregion receives anywhere from 400 to 500 mm of precipitation annually. Similarly, the area of Montmartre receives an average of 428 mm of precipitation each year, as recorded at the Indian Head weather station. The majority of precipitation comes in the spring and summer months from May to August. June receives the highest amount of precipitation annually, getting an average of 77.4 mm. The maximum rainfall recorded in one day was 167.6 mm on June 15, 1897. The maximum snowfall in one day is recorded as 45.7 cm on May 19, 1910.

=== Ecology ===
Montmartre is located in the Aspen Parkland Ecoregion, one of Saskatchewan's 11 ecoregions. The Aspen Parkland separates the Boreal Forest in the north and the Grasslands in the south. Having been characterized by aspen poplars, oak groves, mixed tall shrub and scattered fescue grasslands prior to settlement, the Aspen Parkland is now largely made up of farmland. The natural vegetation is mainly spear grass, wheat grass, blue grama grass and sagebrush. The landscape is formed from glacial till characterized by short, steep slopes and many water-filled valleys, small lakes, ponds and sloughs that surround Montmartre, providing excellent conditions for waterfowl to thrive.

Montmartre is located in between the Chapleau Lakes, just over two kilometres northeast and northwest of either lake. These two lakes are the biggest bodies of water in the Montmartre area and are the source of Moose Mountain Creek.

Saskatchewan water supplies are currently facing a problem with the aquatic invasive species, the zebra and quagga mussels. These are highly invasive mussels that threaten aquatic habitats by competing with native species. The mussels act as water filters, removing microscopic plants and animals from the water, which limits the food sources for the native species.

The wildlife around Montmartre is quite diverse, ranging from small rodents such as squirrels, gophers, and porcupines to big carnivores such as badgers, foxes, and coyotes. The white-tailed deer is the prominent species in the area, along with coyotes and the red fox. Many herbivores roam the area such as the snowshoe hare, the cottontail rabbit, the northern pocket gopher, and Franklin's ground squirrel. Prior to settlement, bison and pronghorn antelope were more common, as were predators such as wolves. Today, settlement and agriculture have caused many species, such as the bison, to become nearly extinct in the area.

== Industry ==
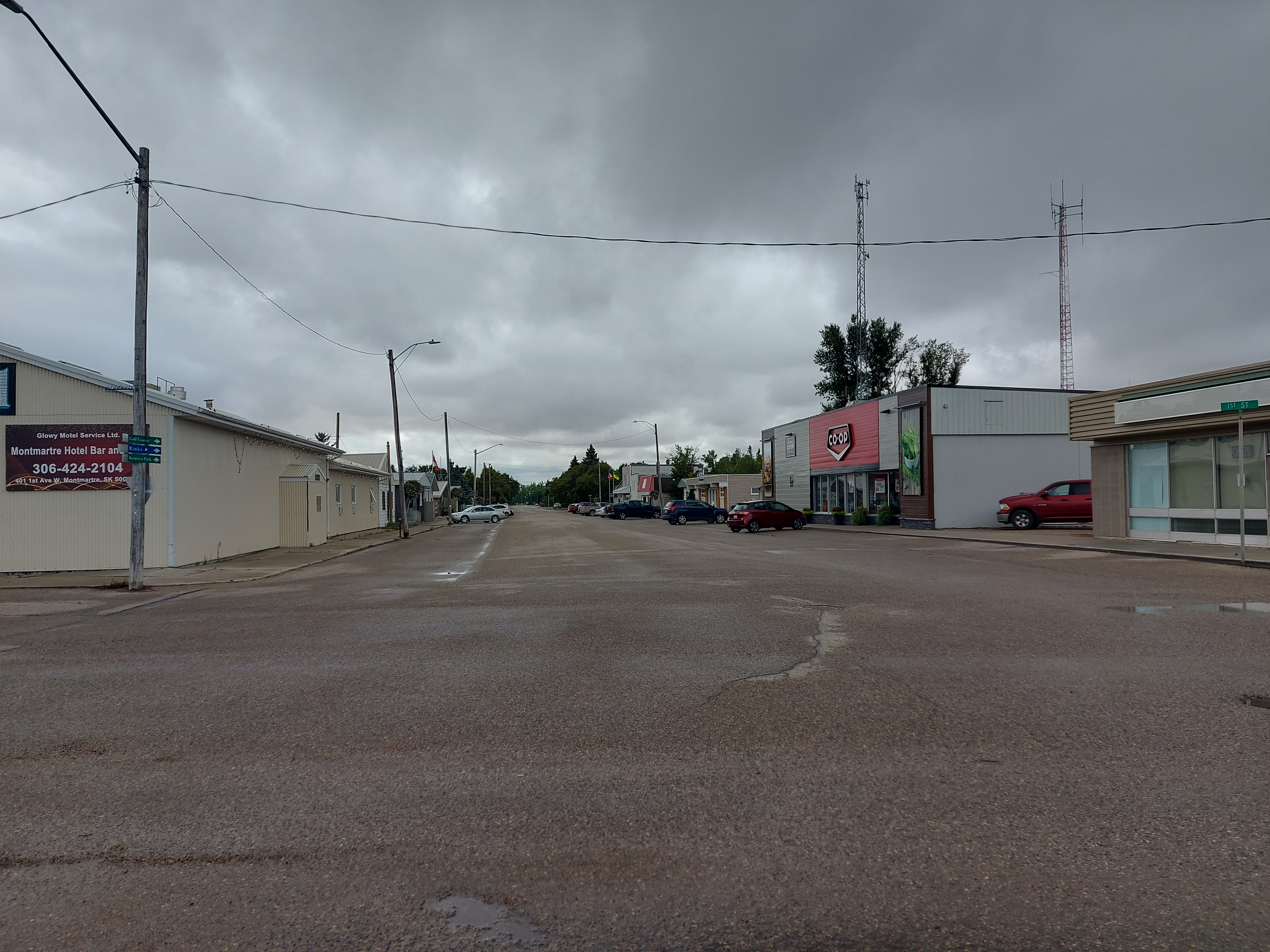
Central Ave, downtown Montmartre

The main source of industry in Montmartre is agriculture. The majority of the surrounding farmers grow various grain crops or raise livestock. The mineral soils in Saskatchewan have seven classifications. The soils of Montmartre are a category three. Categories one to three are rated the most suitable for long-term production of common, cultivated field crops. There were also 22 oil wells located within the Rural Municipality. As of November 2015, the village is serviced by two grocery stores. The community has a bank and a credit union. There are two restaurants and an assortment of retail and service-related ventures.

== Services ==
In June 1894 the federal Post Office Department in Ottawa decided that Montmartre would receive its first post office. The building was opened on September 1, 1894. Victor Raymond Ogier was named Postmaster. It was his duty to travel 40 kilometres (25 mi) to Indian Head every Thursday and return to Montmartre on Saturday. It was said that he never missed a trip. The current post office is located at 115 Central Avenue. It was constructed in 1955 by Marcel Ferraton. The first post office of Montmartre was opened in 1894 on Sec. 16, Twp. 15, R. 11, W2. The second post office opened in 1907 two and a half miles away on Sec. 34, Twp. 14, R. 11, W2 two days after the first one was closed.

The Montmartre Health Care Centre provides inpatient and outpatient care. The facility currently has a 16-bed long-term care facility. It also provides a variety of services such as addictions, help, nutrition advice, community therapy and health promotion.

Montmartre has a Royal Canadian Mounted Police (RCMP) detachment; it is a satellite of the Indian head detachment. The Montmartre Fire Department is a brigade of 15 members. The Montmartre Public Library is run by volunteers. The village voted and fund-raised to have one established in the community.

The Montmartre Housing Authority provides affordable housing to seniors and low income families. There are two senior living complexes, Sunset Homes and Sunset Manor. The authority also has five low income family homes.

== Transportation ==
=== Highways ===
Highway 48 runs from White City at Highway 1 to Virden, Manitoba, at Highway 1. It crosses Montmartre at the 70-km mark. Highway 606 runs north from Highway 18 to Highway 1 near Sintaluta and runs through Montmartre.

=== Railways ===
The Canadian Pacific Railway (CPR) was granted title to sections of land through Montmartre on May 13, 1901. The great race between the Canadian Northern Railway (CNoR) line and CPR was intense. CNoR. was able to lay its tracks first through Montmartre by constructing a line from Brandon, Manitoba, to Regina and by April 14, 1908, the first scheduled trains were running through the village. Today the CN Glenavon branch line crosses through the village.

== Education ==
The Montmartre K-12 School is part of the Prairie Valley School division. In 2015, the school employed 17 teachers and 20 support staff including administrative assistants, educational assistants, care-takers and bus drivers, serving the needs of 217 students.

== Agriculture ==
=== Crop information 1916-1938 ===
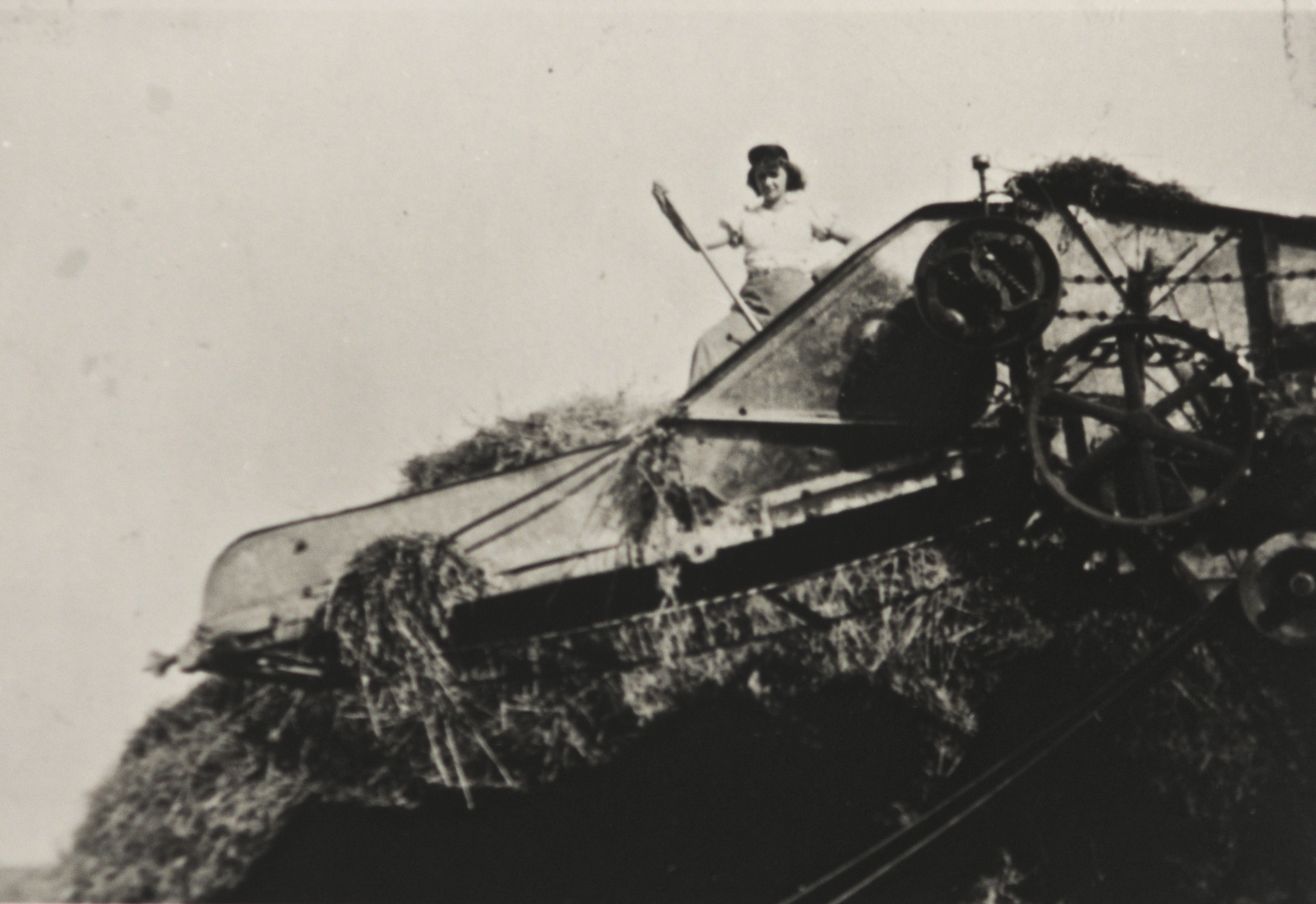
Early mechanized harvest equipment, Montmartre SK, 1927

Crop District No. 2, Regina-Weyburn (Including Montmartre):

Early records indicate that popular crops grown in the Montmartre area from 1916-1938 included wheat, oats, barley, and flax. Also grown, but to a lesser extent, were various varieties of rye grains.

Wheat production surged throughout the 1920s, hitting a peak in 1926 with over 35 million bushels produced on record. The peak production of oats came in 1925, with production in excess of 21 million bushels. 1928 was a high producing year for barley, showing production of more than 6 million bushels from an acreage of 220,552, which is significant considering the average production for the next 10 years was below two million bushels per year with an average acreage of 185,109. The popularity and success of flax in the area varied, although 1916 is the only year in the period where production was greater than 1 million bushels. An average of flax production from 1929-1938 is 138,250 bushels per year.

1931 and 1937 were particularly bad years for farming in the Montmartre area, showing drastically reduced yield and crop production throughout all principal crops grown in Crop District No 2.

=== Crop information 1938–present ===
Although the Montmartre area has continued to see the production of wheat, oats, barley, and flax throughout this period, the variety of crops grown in the area has increased drastically as farming practices have changed and seeding options have become more diverse. Government of Saskatchewan reports indicate that canola, mustard, sunflowers, lentils, peas, and canary seed have all been grown, to varying degrees of success, in the R.M. of Montmartre throughout this period of time.

Difficult farming years include 1988 and 1989, wherein all crop yields in the Montmartre area suffered. In 1988, a widespread drought affected crop yields throughout Saskatchewan.

=== Livestock ===
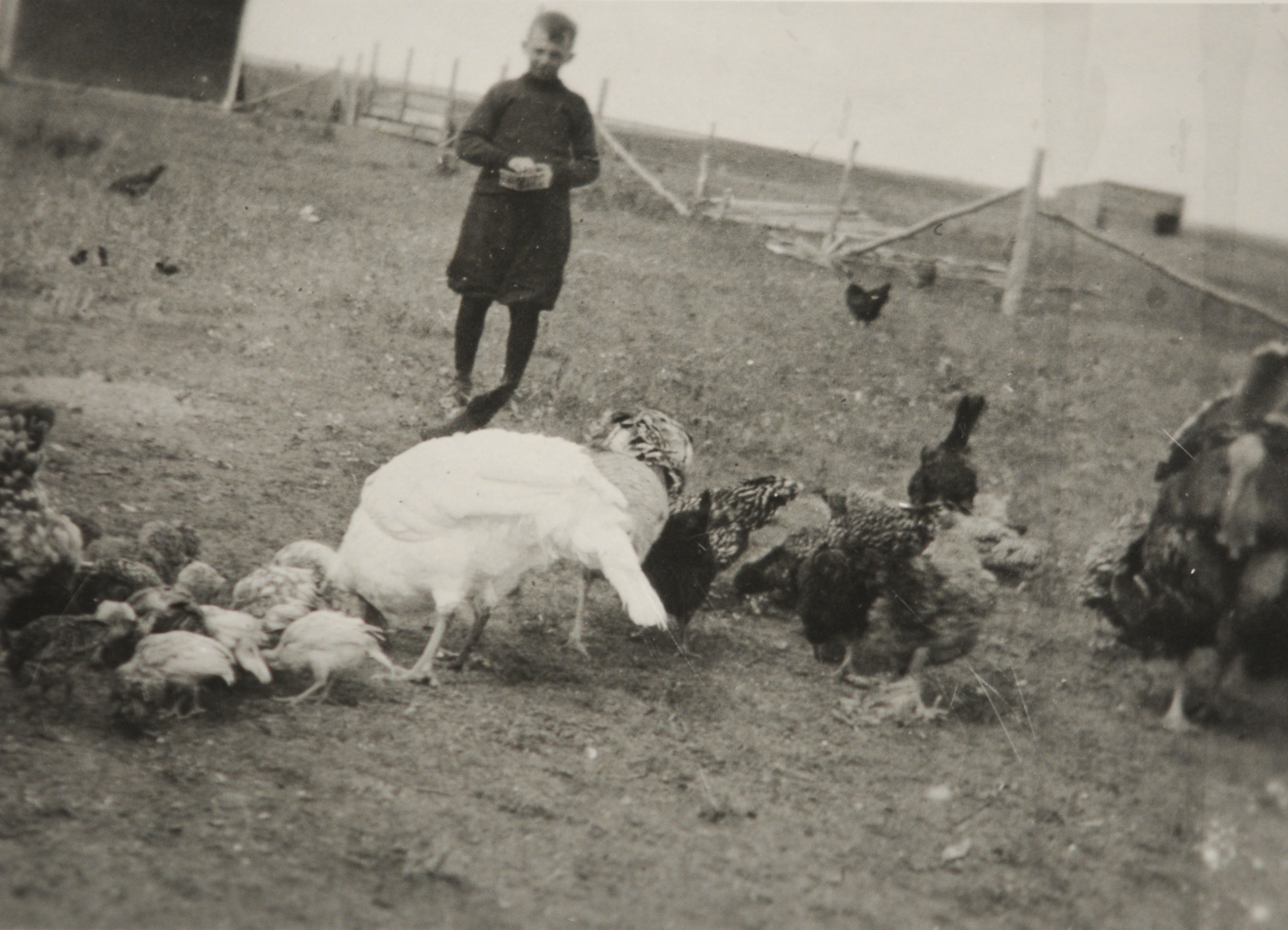
Raising chickens, Montmartre SK, 1920

The Montmartre area, like much of Saskatchewan's farmland, sees diversity in its economy. Many farms in the RM of Montmartre raise livestock. According to the 2011 Census of Agriculture, 84 farms in the RM of Montmartre reported a collective total of 11,192 cattle and calves. Four farms reported a collective total of 418 sheep and lambs. Twenty-seven farms reported a collective total of 636 horses and ponies. Seven farms reported a collective total of 536 hens and chickens. To a lesser extent, farms in the Montmartre area also reported 17 goats, 22 llamas and alpacas, and 31 rabbits.

=== Historical farming in Montmartre ===
Settlers began to arrive in the Montmartre area in the late 1800s and early 1900s. Each farmer started out with a quarter section of land.

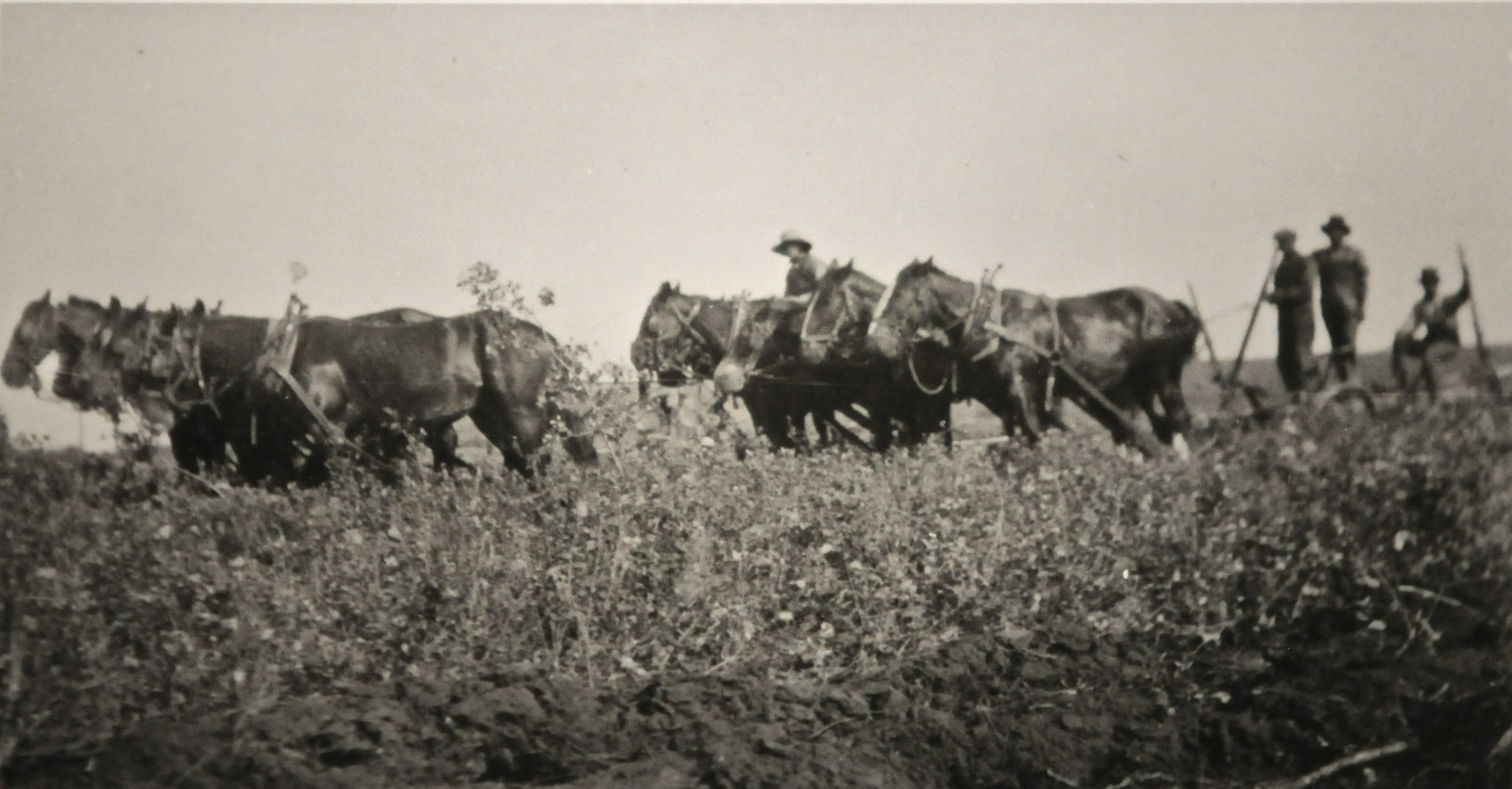
Horses pulling early farming equipment, Montmartre SK, 1928

In early years, horses were incredibly important to farmers in the Montmartre area, as they were the primary work animals on a farm. As farms became larger, more land was broken for raising crops. Horses were instrumental in the breaking of the land, as well as the subsequent farming activities. Steel ploughs were used by farmers, and required the strength of horses to pull them as they turned up the soil for planting. As ploughs became larger and more complex, more horses were required. Horses were also required to pull seeding and harvest equipment.

Slowly but surely, horses were phased out by machines, as farming equipment became larger and heavier. The first tractors introduced in the Montmartre area were powered by steam.

Apart from horses, early farmers in the Montmartre area kept many other livestock animals. Cows were used for both milk products and meat. Chickens, ducks, turkeys, and geese supplied not only meat and eggs, but also feathers for pillows and comforters. Pigs supplied meat and lard, which was used for cooking, as well as in the production of soap.

Early harvests were loaded on to wagons and pulled north by horses to the nearest rail line. In 1908, a rail line was put through the Montmartre R.M. Following the arrival of the rail line, grain elevators were built to handle local harvests.

Agriculture practices in the Montmartre area have advanced along with those used in the rest of the province, and now reflect the modern techniques used throughout the Canadian prairies.

== Culture ==
=== All Folk'd Up Music Festival ===
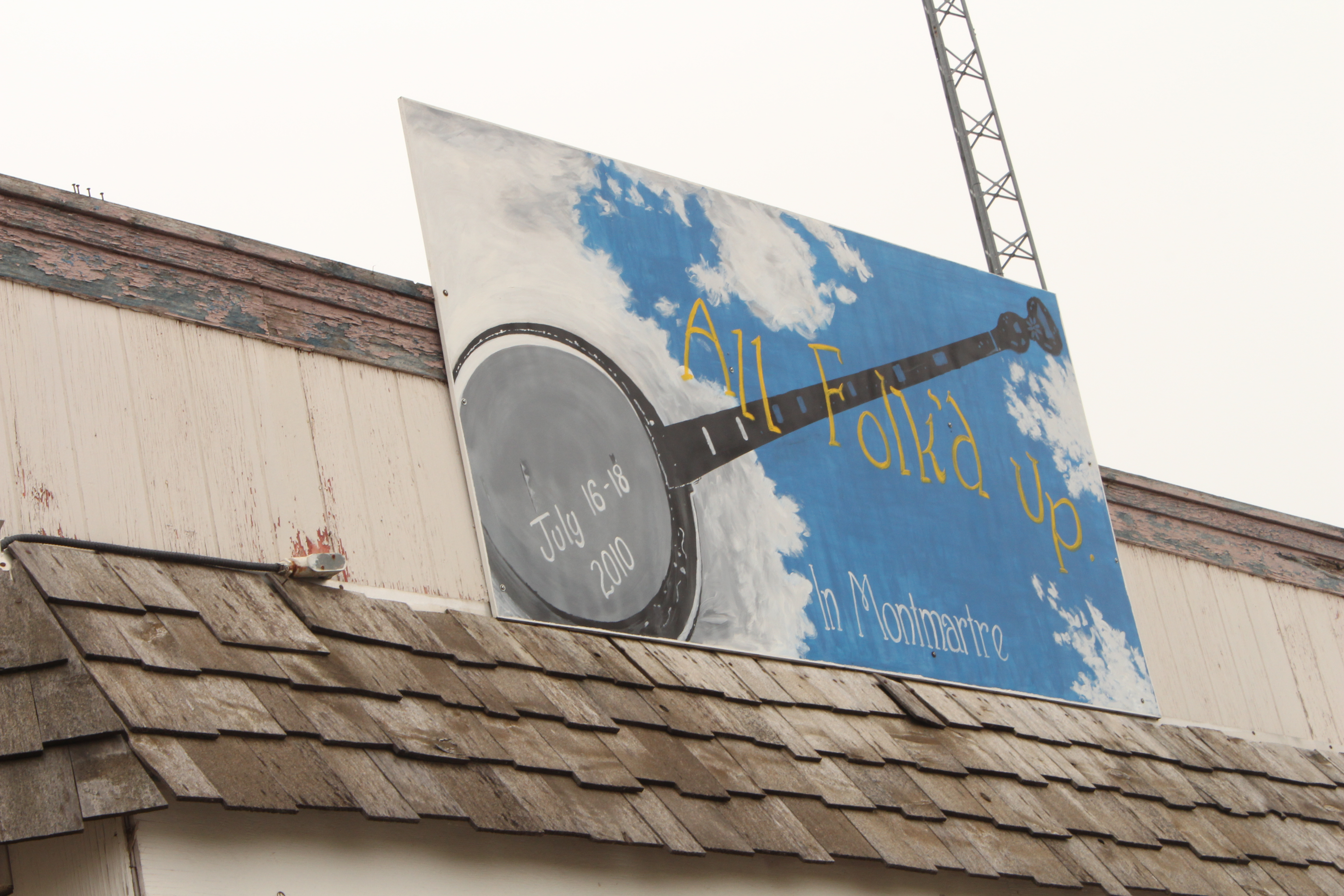
The first sign for the All Folk'd Up Music Festival in Montmartre, Saskatchewan

The All Folk'd Up Music Festival aims to unite members of the community by sourcing local Saskatchewan talent for their shows. It was founded in 2010 by three Fournier sisters and three Deringer sisters. It has been held in July of every year after that. The community relies heavily on volunteer support to put the festival on.

=== Centre 48 ===
Centre 48 offers a variety of arts and sports classes to the surrounding communities such as: piano, drums, guitar, and kickboxing, and yoga. In addition, the centre also offers pre-school. Also for kids, there is: Lego club, craft club, and rhythmic gymnastics. As for education classes, Centre 48 offers a computer education class, a seniors scam prevention and a French class as well. Sometimes, the classes are held in the neighbouring villages instead of just Montmartre.

== Tourism ==
=== Kemoca Regional Park ===
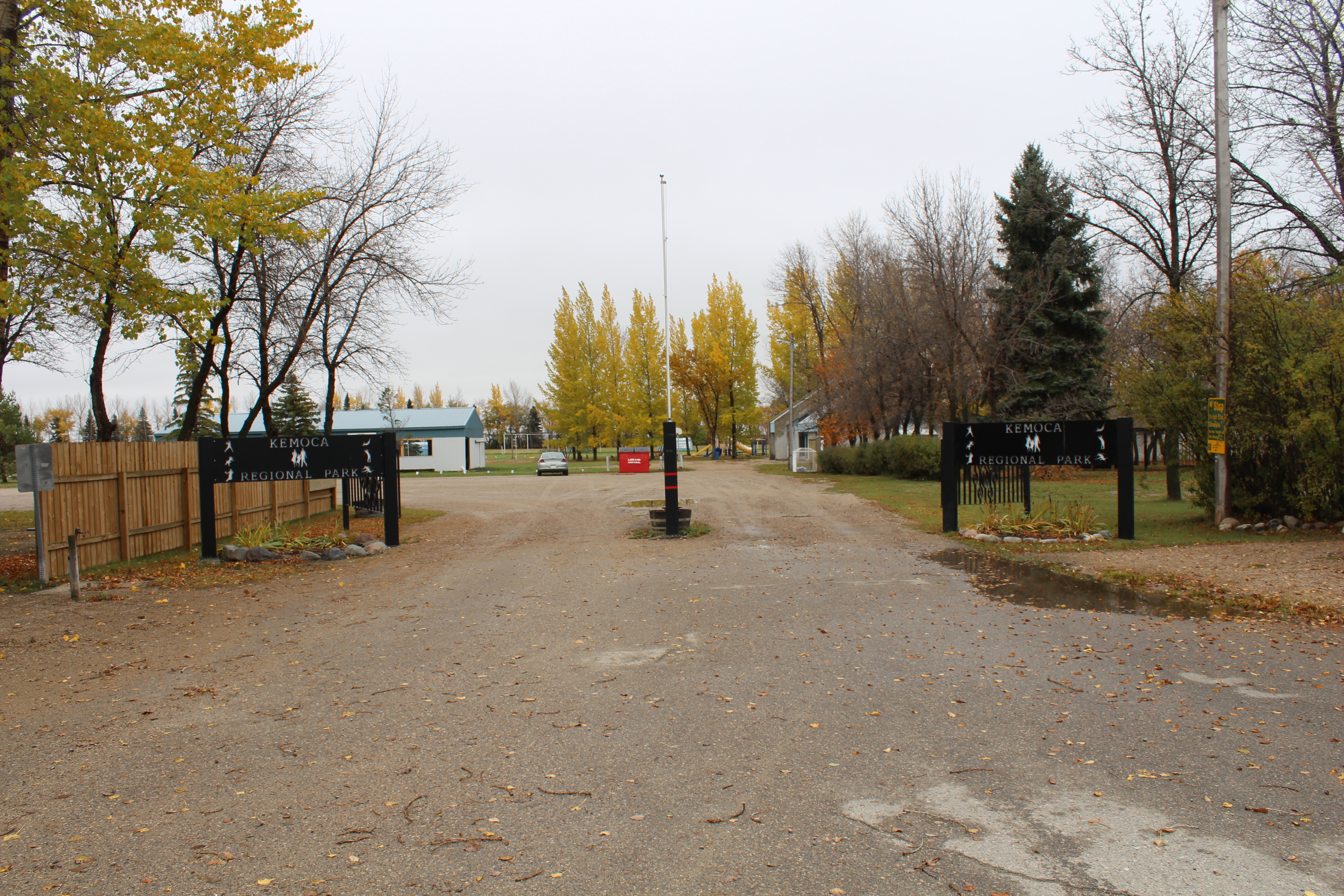
Entrance signs to Kemoca Regional Park in Montmartre, Saskatchewan

Named after three communities (including Montmartre), Kemoca Regional Park (50.2149°N 103.4482°W) serves as a multipurpose area for Montmartre and surrounding areas. The three communities are: Kendal, Montmartre, and Candiac, and by using the first two letters of each village's name, the moniker was chosen.

In the spring of 1970, Kemoca Regional Park was ready to open. At that time, the park contained: six non-electrical campsites, a swimming pool (with an old school house being used for the change room), a nine-hole sand green golf course (with an unused school house for a clubhouse), four softball diamonds, one baseball diamond, and a 400-metre track with a concrete curb.

The main adversities that faced the construction of the park were the lack of certainty in funding and a fire that ravaged the park in 1984. The fire came at a time where the provincial government was doubtful of the status of the park as a Regional Park because of its proximity to Montmartre.

In surpassing its difficulties, the park has become a cultural centre to Montmartre and the surrounding communities. Both 30 amp and 50 amp service is now offered at their 52 camping sites while a playground now stands near a multi-purpose shelter. Many improvements to the sports facilities at the park have contributed to its success in the community, such as: the addition of covered dugouts and a batting cage, beach volleyball courts, a basketball area, a 1.5 km walking trail, a disc golf course, improvements to the pool area, and an equipment shed.

=== The Eiffel Tower ===
The village of Montmartre has recently re-branded itself as the "Paris of the Prairies" in order to better represent the town. The Eiffel Tower in Montmartre completed construction in 2009 and is an exact replica at 1/38th of the size of the original. It is made entirely of steel.

== Architecture and buildings ==
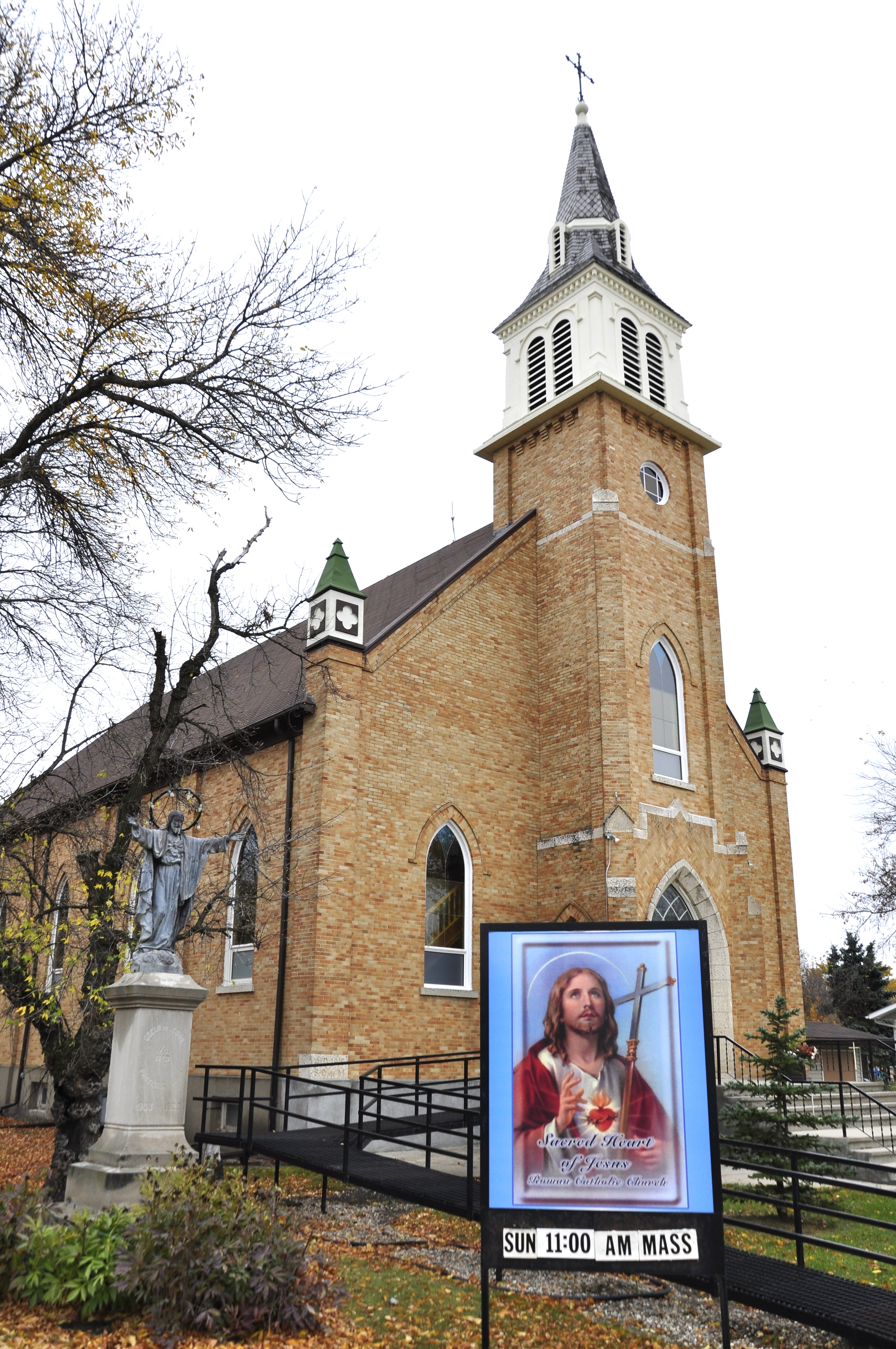
Sacred Heart of Jesus Roman Catholic Church

According to the Census of Canada, as of 2011, the town has 220 private dwellings.

The Montmartre Co-op Food Store was built in 1937 and has been a cornerstone of the town and surrounding area since it was built. The Co-op was initially started by 16 farmers and has grown significantly to serve 1,100 people from the surround towns of Kendal, Candiac, Fillmore, Francis and Glanavon and there are now two buildings, one of which houses and Agro-Centre.

Montmartre, Saskatchewan has a local health centre with an attached special care.

Montmartre School is a kindergarten - grade 12 school administered by the Prairie Valley School Division.

Community landmarks include the Roman Catholic Sacred Heart Parish Church which was built in 1918, the St. Peter and Paul Ukrainian Church constructed between 1950 and 1952, and the Eiffel Tower Replica which stands 30 ft tall and is located in Montmartre's Eiffel Tower Park.

== Clubs and organizations ==
=== Golden Age Seniors Club ===
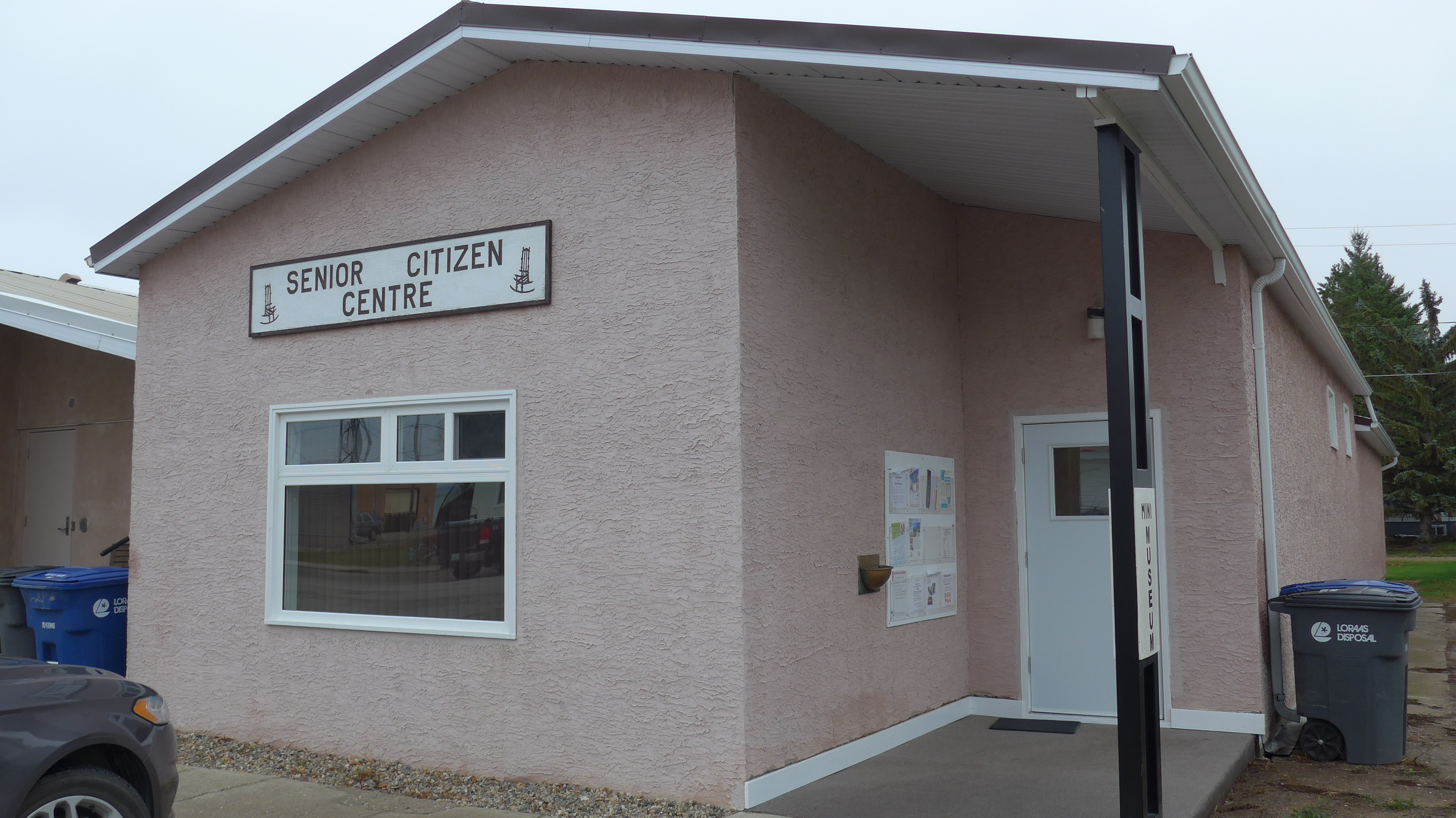
Senior Centre

The Golden Age Seniors Club was founded in 1973, and most of its activities take place at the Seniors Hall, or Seniors' Centre. The organization uses all volunteer labour, and board meetings are regularly held. Activities and games such as pool games, bingo, cribbage, and shuffleboard are provided at the Seniors Club, and there are more exercises, gatherings, and even monthly birthday card parties held. There are picnics held in summer and Christmas dinner in winter.

The Seniors Centre building is a one-floor house with an activity room, a kitchen and two washrooms. On one side of the activity room, there is an exhibition commonly called Mini Museum that showcases the rich history of Montmartre.

=== Lions Club ===
Montmartre and District Lions Club is subordinate to the Lions Club, which is a global organization that consists of volunteers working in their communities. The motto of the club is "We serve." The Montmartre Lions Club was originally sponsored by Regina Central Lions in 1964. It has numerous fundraisers since then. Meetings are held on the first and third Tuesdays every month.

Lions Clubs in general are best known for working with the blind and visually impaired, and its branch in Montmartre helped in raising donations for a local kindergarten, Boy Scouts, Heart and Stroke Foundation, and an eye centre in Regina.

=== Farmers Market Co-operative Limited ===
The Farmers Market is also a non-profit organization founded in 2002. It has a seven-member Board of Directors, and the members host two events on the first Saturday of May and third or fourth Saturday of November every year. The events are held in the Community Hall. They started economic development promotion of "make it, bake it, grow it" items. Later on, home-based businesses joined the event.

=== Saveagoose Wildlife Federation ===
Saveagoose Wildlife Organization is a branch of the Wildlife Federation established in 1929, which is "a non-profit, non-government, charitable organization of over 33,000 members in 122 branches across Saskatchewan representing every walk of life" and the largest per capita conservationist group in the world. The organization helps acknowledging "first and foremost that the wildlife of the province is a public resource belonging to all Saskatchewan residents, and to ensure the resource remains equally accessible to all residents of the province," promoting "conservation, fishing, trapping, hunting, the shooting sports, and wildlife-oriented activities," practicing and promoting "wise management and use of our natural resources," acquiring and enhancing "habitat for wildlife" and so on.

The branch was founded on December 6, 1981, at Montmartre High School. It particularly provides a $500 bursary to students who choose conservation or the environment as their careers. It also sponsors students between 14 and 17 who would attend a weeklong conservation camp every July.

=== Army Cadets ===
Montmartre Army Cadets, fully named Montmartre Legion Army Cadet Corps, was formed on November 1, 1982. It is a charitable organization formerly sponsored by Murray's Sales and Service and Montmartre Lions Club, and by Royal Canadian Legion, Montmartre after October 12, 1984. and Montmartre Lions Club, and by Royal Canadian Legion, Montmartre after October 12, 1984.

The organization is a youth group, focused on education. In 2009, its programs included an indoor air rifle range for weekly practices, transportation and meals for shooting competitions, biathlon competitions and cadet training exercises in a building that's also used for regular meetings, training and exercises.

== Women of Montmartre ==
=== The Ladies Aid ===
The Ladies Aid has raised money to help with church and village activities throughout the years in Montmartre. An example is the annual fowl suppers, something that the community continues with today. In 1914, the group was formed from two groups – the Moffat Women's Foreign Missions and the Moffat Home Missions. The Ladies Aid have always had an important role within the church for both fundraising, but also having a presence within the community. The women were responsible for raising money for many things regarding the church, big and small, including the purchasing and placing of pews in the church in 1928. Many of the group's sponsored activities had a very big impact on many people in Montmartre from the beginning of its existence, as they were used for the majority of funding for anything in the town.

=== Schools of Montmartre and the Sacred Heart Convent ===
In the beginning, mostly French was taught, with English classes at night available for those who chose to learn it and had the time available. The first school built was known at the Big House. A second school opened to replace the first in 1903 and it was known as Joffre School. In 1910, a third school came when the railway and the new village of Montmartre were built. In 1912 a second school was built to help accommodate population demands. In 1919 the school burnt down and members of the Sisters of Our Lady of the Cross came to Montmartre to build a new school to replace it. This new school became Sacred Heart in 1920 and existed until 1970. The school operated as both a public school (in no way connected to the convent) and a private school. In 1926 the first sister joined the teaching staff in the public school, and until the 1970s many sisters could be found on the teaching staff.

=== Montmartre Ladies Auxiliary ===
Women of the community volunteered and raised money for any extra help the hospital may need, along with the needs of the patients. This started in 1949, when local women stopped raising money for the Red Cross and instead devoted their time and attention to helping and giving back to their own community. Fundraising from the women provided the hospital with many comforts, including sterilizers, clothes, operating tables, bookcases, room lamps, and many more items. This group of women have had many names throughout the years, but are currently known as the Ladies Auxiliary.

== Notable people ==
- Norm Beaudin, professional ice hockey player in the National Hockey League
- Michelle Englot, curler

== See also ==
- List of communities in Saskatchewan
- List of francophone communities in Saskatchewan
- List of villages in Saskatchewan

== Sources ==
- Montmartre: History Book Committee (2012). Montmartre: History of the Village and RM 126, volume 1. Montmartre, Saskatchewan: Friesens Corporation. ISBN 978-1-55383-309-3.
- Montmartre: History Book Committee (2012). Montmartre: History of the Village and RM 126, volume 2. Montmartre, Saskatchewan: Friesens Corporation. ISBN 978-1-55383-309-3.
- "Montmartre". The Wolseley News. 47.
- McLennan, David (2008), Our Towns: Saskatchewan Communities from Abbey to Zenon Park, University of Regina Press, ISBN 978-0-88977-209-0
- Montmartre Paris of the Prairies Saskatchewan. Steve Mcdonnell.
