= Rural Municipality of Walpole No. 92 =

Rural municipality in Saskatchewan, Canada

Walpole No. 92 Pipestone No. 92 (1910–1911)
- Rural municipality
- Rural Municipality of Walpole No. 92
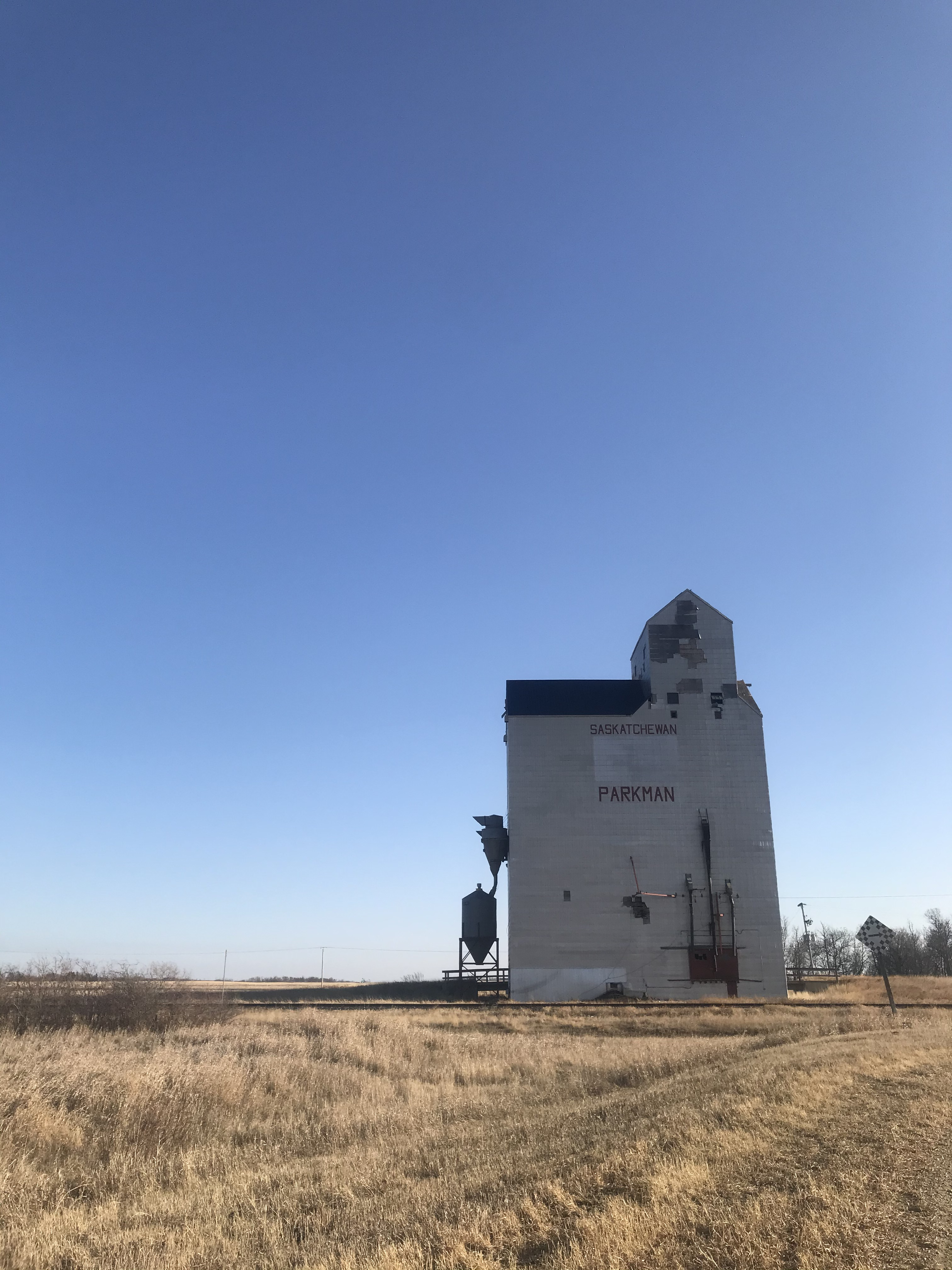
- Grain elevator in Parkman

- Location of the RM of Walpole No. 92 in Saskatchewan
- Coordinates: 49.881°N 101.856°W
- Country: Canada
- Province: Saskatchewan
- Census division: 1
- SARM division: 1
- Federal riding: Souris—Moose Mountain
- Provincial riding: Cannington; Moosomin
- Formed: December 12, 1910
- Name change: February 15, 1911 (from RM of Pipestone No. 92)

Government
  - Reeve: Hugh Smyth
  - Governing body: RM of Walpole No. 92 Council
  - Administrator: Deborah C. Saville
  - Office location: Wawota

Area (2016)
  - Land: 844.66 km^{2} (326.13 sq mi)

Population (2016)
  - Total: 326
  - Density: 0.4/km^{2} (1.0/sq mi)
- Time zone: CST
  - Summer (DST): CST
- Postal code: S0G 5A0
- Area codes: 306 and 639
- Website: walpolerm.com

The Rural Municipality of Walpole No. 92 (2016 population: 326) is a rural municipality (RM) in the Canadian province of Saskatchewan within Census Division No. 1 and SARM Division No. 1.

== History ==
The RM of Pipestone No. 92 was originally incorporated as a rural municipality on December 12, 1910. Its name was changed to the RM of Walpole No. 92 on February 15, 1911.

== Geography ==
=== Communities and localities ===
The following unincorporated communities are within the RM:

Hamlets

- Kelso
- Parkman
- Walpole

Localities

- Doonside
- Mair
- Riga

== Demographics ==
Population history (1981–2016)
Year	Pop.	±%
1981	711	—
1986	653	−8.2%
1991	527	−19.3%
1996	454	−13.9%
2001	381	−16.1%
2006	348	−8.7%
2011	338	−2.9%
2016	326	−3.6%
Source: Statistics Canada via Saskatchewan Bureau of Statistics

In the 2021 Census of Population conducted by Statistics Canada, the RM of Walpole No. 92 had a population of 292 living in 116 of its 135 total private dwellings, a change of −10.4% from its 2016 population of 326. With a land area of 832.36 km^{2} (321.38 sq mi), it had a population density of 0.4/km^{2} (0.9/sq mi) in 2021.

In the 2016 Census of Population, the RM of Walpole No. 92 recorded a population of 326 living in 126 of its 149 total private dwellings, a −3.6% change from its 2011 population of 338. With a land area of 844.66 km^{2} (326.13 sq mi), it had a population density of 0.4/km^{2} (1.0/sq mi) in 2016.

== Government ==
The RM of Walpole No. 92 is governed by an elected municipal council and an appointed administrator that meets on the second Wednesday of every month. The reeve of the RM is Hugh Smyth while its administrator is Deborah C. Saville. The RM's office is located in Wawota.

== Transportation ==
Rail

- Reston Section C.P.R. − serves Reston, Ewart, Ebor, Maryfield, Fairlight, Walpole, Wawota, Dumas

Roads

- Highway 48
- Highway 8
- Highway 601

== See also ==
- List of rural municipalities in Saskatchewan
