= Kristjan Hebert =

Canadian entrepreneur

Kristjan Hebert is a Canadian grain farmer, public speaker, zero-till advocate, and ag-tech entrepreneur based in Saskatchewan. He is known for his contributions to agricultural practices, particularly zero-till farming, and his advocacy for sustainable agriculture and agri-technology. Hebert is also recognized for his role in policy discussions and his insights on agriculture's part in the climate change dialogue.

== Early life and education ==
Kristjan Hebert was raised on a 320-acre family farm in Fairlight, Saskatchewan. His childhood experiences of growing up on a small farm shaped his perspective on farming, as he witnessed first-hand the blend of memorable times and challenging situations, dictated by the farm's needs and the time commitments of his father.

Hebert pursued a career as a Certified Public Accountant (CPA) before deciding to return to the family farm.

== Career ==
=== Farm management ===
Hebert operates a large-scale grain and oilseed farm near Moosomin, Saskatchewan, managing Hebert Grain Ventures (HGV), a 32,000-acre operation. The farm employs 15 full-time workers and another 15 seasonally.

After returning to farming, Hebert transitioned the management style from a lifestyle to a business approach. He emphasizes teamwork and employee satisfaction in his operations, giving workers a say in decision-making processes, particularly about expansions. The farm offers a career progression plan, and perks like allowing employees to donate to organizations that benefit their families.

Hebert also runs a non-profit foundation supporting local community organizations, focusing on youth sports, education, and healthcare.

=== Advocacy and public speaking ===
Hebert frequently participates in panel discussions and public forums to share his expertise and insights on agricultural practices and policies. He is an advocate for sustainable and profitable farming, emphasizing the importance of acknowledging and rewarding farmers for carbon sequestration efforts, particularly via practices such as zero-till agriculture.

He is also known for challenging the perception of farming as a significant contributor to climate change, arguing that farming should instead be viewed as a solution in efforts to combat climate change. Hebert criticizes the federal government's decision to exclude farmers who practiced reduced tillage before 2017 from receiving credit for storing carbon in the soil.

Hebert is a proponent of innovative crop insurance systems. He calls for a more flexible, accessible, and customizable approach, arguing that financial risk varies significantly from region to region and farm to farm. He suggests the introduction of private insurance to supplement government products and address rapidly rising costs of inputs like fertilizer, seeds, and chemicals.

=== Ag-tech entrepreneurship ===
As an ag-tech entrepreneur, Hebert believes in the critical role of technology in modern farming. He advocates for open API systems, flat-fee payments for large farms, creative payments for first adopters, and a four-screen management system dashboard for optimized operations. His long-term vision includes integrating various technologies for farming efficiency, such as Crop Intelligence, Granular, Crystal Green, Bin-Sense, and Libra Cart.

== Impact and legacy ==
Hebert is a key figure in Saskatchewan's agricultural scene, leading large-scale farming operations while advocating for responsible and sustainable farming practices. His work extends to the wider Canadian agricultural community, as he actively participates in policy discussions and promotes innovation in farming and agri-technology. Hebert continues to influence the field with his unique combination of farming experience, financial expertise, and entrepreneurial spirit. His actions reflect his belief in maximizing the profitability of farming for the benefit of farmers, the community, and the environment.

== Recognition ==
Hebert has gained international recognition for his contributions to agriculture. In an article by SaskToday, he was recognized as one of nine “climate champions” by Corteva Agriscience.
