= Candiac, Saskatchewan =

Hamlet in Saskatchewan, Canada

Coordinates: 50°12′41″N 103°15′33″W

Candiac is an organized hamlet located at the intersection of Highway 48 and Highway 617 in the southeast quadrant of Saskatchewan, Canada. It is directly south of Wolseley, and between Montmartre and Glenavon, approximately one hour's drive southeast of the provincial capital Regina. It is no longer listed as a separate community by Statistics Canada, and is considered part of the Rural Municipality of Montmartre No. 126. The population within the community's boundary is less than 50. Besides some bush on the northern end of the town, it is surrounded by open fields and pasture.

Population (2001) - (district of montmartre)	548 (Statistics Canada)
Population (1996) - (district of montmartre)	574 (Statistics Canada)
Area	unknown
Postal code	S0G 0N0
Coordinates	52.2114, -103.2592

Primary income of community members is derived from agricultural businesses (farming, ranching).

== History ==
During the early 1900s, settlers came from east-central Europe, being specifically of German, Polish, and Ukrainian origin. There is a known Polish settlement dated 1896. It has been proposed that the earliest settlement of Ukrainians in Canada was near the town.

At one time, there were two schools that offered education up to grade 12.

== Demographics ==
In the 2021 Census of Population conducted by Statistics Canada, Candiac had a population of 10 living in 5 of its 8 total private dwellings, a change of -50% from its 2016 population of 20. With a land area of 0.28 km^{2} (0.11 sq mi), it had a population density of 35.7/km^{2} (92.5/sq mi) in 2021.

== Places of interest ==
Churches — one (Polish Catholic, built in 1913)

== See also ==
- List of communities in Saskatchewan
