= Erautt =

Erautt is a surname. Notable people with the surname include:

- Eddie Erautt (1924–2013), American baseball player
- Joe Erautt (1921–1976), Canadian baseball player
