= Ryerson, Saskatchewan =

Community in Saskatchewan, Canada

Ryerson
- Unincorporated area
- Location within Saskatchewan Location within Canada
- Coordinates: 49°47′0″N 101°40′2″W
- Country: Canada
- Province: Saskatchewan
- Region: Southeastern
- Census division: 1
- Rural municipality: Maryfield No. 91
- Time zone: CST
- Postal code: S0N 2G0
- Area code: 306
- Highways: Highway 8
- Railways: Great Western Railway

Ryerson is an unincorporated area within the Rural Municipality of Maryfield No. 91, in the Canadian province of Saskatchewan.

== See also ==
- List of communities in Saskatchewan
