= Rural Municipality of Montmartre No. 126 =

Rural municipality in Saskatchewan, Canada

Montmartre No. 126
- Rural municipality
- Rural Municipality of Montmartre No. 126
- Location of the RM of Montmartre No. 126 in Saskatchewan
- Coordinates: 50.286°N 103.464°W
- Country: Canada
- Province: Saskatchewan
- Census division: 6
- SARM division: 1
- Federal riding: Souris—Moose Mountain
- Provincial riding: Moosomin
- Formed: December 13, 1909

Government
  - Reeve: Bernard Kotylak
  - Governing body: RM of Montmartre No. 126 Council
  - Administrator: Dale Brenner
  - Office location: Montmartre

Area (2016)
  - Land: 853.84 km^{2} (329.67 sq mi)

Population (2016)
  - Total: 483
  - Density: 0.6/km^{2} (1.6/sq mi)
- Time zone: CST
  - Summer (DST): CST
- Postal code: S0G 3M0
- Area codes: 306 and 639

The Rural Municipality of Montmartre No. 126 (2016 population: 483) is a rural municipality (RM) in the Canadian province of Saskatchewan within Census Division No. 6 and SARM Division No. 1. It is located in the southeast portion of the province along Highway 48.

== History ==
The RM of Montmartre No. 126 incorporated as a rural municipality on December 13, 1909.

== Geography ==
=== Communities and localities ===
The following urban municipalities are surrounded by the RM.

Villages

- Kendal
- Montmartre

The following unincorporated communities are within the RM.

Organized hamlets

- Candiac

The RM is adjacent to the Assiniboine 76 First Nations Indian reserve.

Parks and recreation

- Kemoca Regional Park

== Demographics ==
Population history (1981–2016)
Year	Pop.	±%
1981	874	—
1986	756	−13.5%
1991	649	−14.2%
1996	574	−11.6%
2001	548	−4.5%
2006	503	−8.2%
2011	488	−3.0%
2016	483	−1.0%
Source: Statistics Canada via Saskatchewan Bureau of Statistics

In the 2021 Census of Population conducted by Statistics Canada, the RM of Montmartre No. 126 had a population of 350 living in 137 of its 156 total private dwellings, a change of −27.5% from its 2016 population of 483. With a land area of 817.75 km^{2} (315.74 sq mi), it had a population density of 0.4/km^{2} (1.1/sq mi) in 2021.

In the 2016 Census of Population, the RM of Montmartre No. 126 recorded a population of 483 living in 174 of its 188 total private dwellings, a −1% change from its 2011 population of 488. With a land area of 853.84 km^{2} (329.67 sq mi), it had a population density of 0.6/km^{2} (1.5/sq mi) in 2016.

== Government ==
The RM of Montmartre No. 126 is governed by an elected municipal council and an appointed administrator that meets on the second Tuesday of every month. The reeve of the RM is Bernard Kotylak while its administrator is Dale Brenner. The RM's office is located in Montmartre.
