= Davin, Saskatchewan =

Hamlet in Saskatchewan, Canada

Coordinates: 50°22′56″N 104°06′35″W

Davin is a hamlet in the Canadian province of Saskatchewan, approximately 40 kilometres (25 mi) east of Regina on Highway 48.

== Demographics ==
In the 2021 Census of Population conducted by Statistics Canada, Davin had a population of 50 living in 23 of its 25 total private dwellings, a change of 16.3% from its 2016 population of 43. With a land area of 0.2 km^{2} (0.077 sq mi), it had a population density of 250.0/km^{2} (647.5/sq mi) in 2021.

== See also ==
- List of hamlets in Saskatchewan
