= Vibank =

Village in Saskatchewan, Canada

- Village
- Location within Saskatchewan Location within Canada
- Coordinates: 50.333°N 103.950°W
- Country: Canada
- Province: Francis No. 127
- Region: Saskatchewan
- Census division: 6
- Post office Founded: 1908-10-01
- Incorporated (Village): June 23, 1911

Government
  - Mayor: Ryan Reiss
  - Administrator: Dagmar Crumley

Area
  - Total: 0.73 km^{2} (0.28 sq mi)

Population (2016)
  - Total: 385
  - Density: 509.1/km^{2} (1,319/sq mi)
- Time zone: CST
- Postal code: S0G 4Y0
- Area code: 306
- Highways: Highway 48
- Waterways: Wascana Creek
- Website: Official website

Vibank (2016 population: 385) is a village in the Canadian province of Saskatchewan within the Rural Municipality of Francis No. 127 and Census Division No. 6. It is accessed from Highway 48.

Wascana Creek originates near the community. Fish species in the creek include walleye, yellow perch, northern pike, white sucker, and burbot.

== History ==
Vibank incorporated as a village on June 23, 1911.

== Demographics ==
Population history (1981–2016)
Year	Pop.	±%
1981	369	—
1986	375	+1.6%
1991	375	+0.0%
1996	363	−3.2%
2001	381	+5.0%
2006	361	−5.2%
2011	374	+3.6%
2016	385	+2.9%
Source: Statistics Canada via Saskatchewan Bureau of Statistics

In the 2021 Census of Population conducted by Statistics Canada, Vibank had a population of 386 living in 170 of its 181 total private dwellings, a change of 0.3% from its 2016 population of 385. With a land area of 0.71 km^{2} (0.27 sq mi), it had a population density of 543.7/km^{2} (1,408.1/sq mi) in 2021.

In the 2016 Census of Population, the Village of Vibank recorded a population of 385 living in 171 of its 181 total private dwellings, a 2.9% change from its 2011 population of 374. With a land area of 0.73 km^{2} (0.28 sq mi), it had a population density of 527.4/km^{2} (1,366.0/sq mi) in 2016.

== Notable people ==
- Joe Erautt, a former Major League Baseball player

== See also ==
- List of communities in Saskatchewan
- List of villages in Saskatchewan
