= Maryfield, Saskatchewan =

Village in Saskatchewan, Canada

Maryfield
- Village
- Village of Maryfield
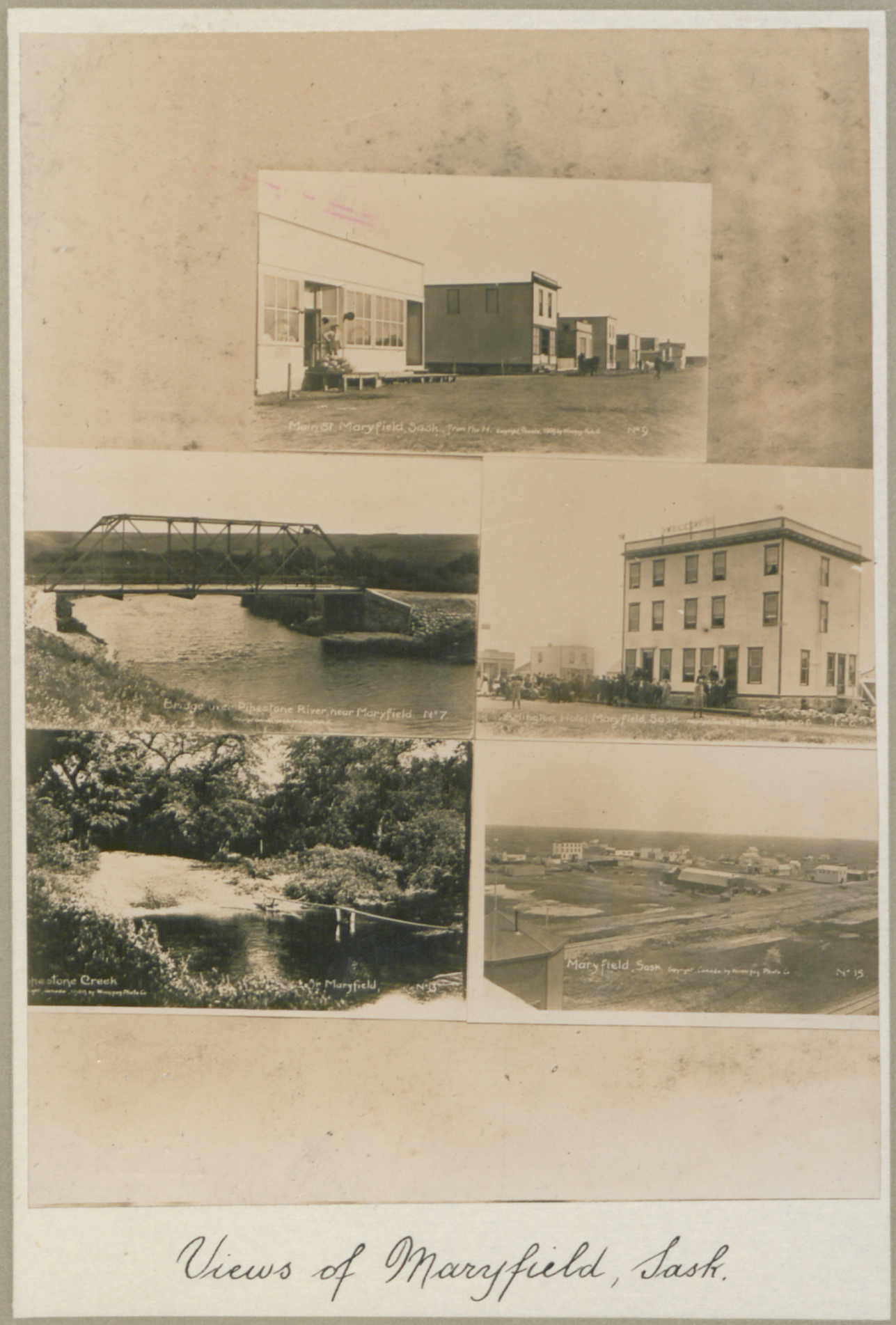
- Views of Maryfield, 1909.

- Location of Maryfield Maryfield (Canada)
- Coordinates: 49°50′06″N 101°31′33″W
- Country: Canada
- Province: Saskatchewan
- Region: Southeast
- Census division: 1
- Rural Municipality: Maryfield
- Post office founded: 1896
- Incorporated (village): 1907

Government
  - Type: Municipal
  - Governing body: Maryfield Village Council
  - Mayor: Scott Eklund
  - Administrator: Denine Neufeld
  - MP: Robert Kitchen
  - MLA: Daryl Harrison

Area
  - Total: 2.69 km^{2} (1.04 sq mi)

Population (2016)
  - Total: 348
  - Density: 129.5/km^{2} (335/sq mi)
- Time zone: UTC-6 (CST)
- Postal code: S0G 3K0
- Area code: 306
- Highways: Highway 48 Highway 600
- Railways: Canadian National Railway

Maryfield (2016 population: 348) is a village in the Canadian province of Saskatchewan within the Rural Municipality of Maryfield No. 91 and Census Division No. 1. The village lies south of the intersection of Highway 48 and Highway 600 and is about 8 kilometres (5.0 mi) west of the Manitoba border. It is a junction point on the Canadian National Railway between the main line heading northwest towards Regina and a branch line heading southwest toward Carlyle and Lampman.

== History ==
John Young McNaught named his homestead after his sister, Mary; he donated land for a school in 1889, with the condition that the name be perpetuated. The name Maryfield was passed on to the post office, then the Canadian Pacific Railway station in 1906. Maryfield incorporated as a village on August 21, 1907.

== Demographics ==
Population history (1981–2016)
Year	Pop.	±%
1981	431	—
1986	422	−2.1%
1991	408	−3.3%
1996	363	−11.0%
2001	359	−1.1%
2006	347	−3.3%
2011	365	+5.2%
2016	348	−4.7%
Source: Statistics Canada via Saskatchewan Bureau of Statistics

In the 2021 Census of Population conducted by Statistics Canada, Maryfield had a population of 311 living in 130 of its 157 total private dwellings, a change of −10.6% from its 2016 population of 348. With a land area of 2.57 km^{2} (0.99 sq mi), it had a population density of 121.0/km^{2} (313.4/sq mi) in 2021.

In the 2016 Census of Population, the Village of Maryfield recorded a population of 348 living in 139 of its 178 total private dwellings, a −4.9% change from its 2011 population of 365. With a land area of 2.69 km^{2} (1.04 sq mi), it had a population density of 129.4/km^{2} (335.1/sq mi) in 2016.

== Climate ==
Climate data for Maryfield
Month	Jan	Feb	Mar	Apr	May	Jun	Jul	Aug	Sep	Oct	Nov	Dec	Year
Record high °C (°F)	10.0 (50.0)	15.0 (59.0)	21.5 (70.7)	34.4 (93.9)	36.7 (98.1)	38.3 (100.9)	37.0 (98.6)	39.0 (102.2)	36.7 (98.1)	33.0 (91.4)	24.0 (75.2)	12.5 (54.5)	39.0 (102.2)
Mean daily maximum °C (°F)	−10.9 (12.4)	−7.0 (19.4)	−0.4 (31.3)	10.0 (50.0)	18.4 (65.1)	22.4 (72.3)	25.0 (77.0)	24.6 (76.3)	18.1 (64.6)	10.7 (51.3)	−0.8 (30.6)	−8.6 (16.5)	8.5 (47.3)
Daily mean °C (°F)	−15.9 (3.4)	−11.8 (10.8)	−5.3 (22.5)	3.9 (39.0)	11.7 (53.1)	16.1 (61.0)	18.5 (65.3)	17.7 (63.9)	11.7 (53.1)	4.9 (40.8)	−5.1 (22.8)	−13.2 (8.2)	2.8 (37.0)
Mean daily minimum °C (°F)	−20.9 (−5.6)	−16.6 (2.1)	−10.1 (13.8)	−2.2 (28.0)	4.9 (40.8)	9.8 (49.6)	11.9 (53.4)	10.7 (51.3)	5.2 (41.4)	−0.9 (30.4)	−9.5 (14.9)	−17.8 (0.0)	−3.0 (26.6)
Record low °C (°F)	−40.0 (−40.0)	−41.0 (−41.8)	−35.6 (−32.1)	−23.5 (−10.3)	−8.0 (17.6)	−1.1 (30.0)	3.0 (37.4)	−1.5 (29.3)	−6.5 (20.3)	−21.0 (−5.8)	−33.5 (−28.3)	−40.0 (−40.0)	−41.0 (−41.8)
Average precipitation mm (inches)	22.8 (0.90)	17.5 (0.69)	26.1 (1.03)	29.5 (1.16)	56.1 (2.21)	80.5 (3.17)	64.7 (2.55)	58.8 (2.31)	50.1 (1.97)	30.2 (1.19)	20.3 (0.80)	24.4 (0.96)	480.9 (18.93)
Source: Environment Canada

== Notable people ==
- Brock Lesnar, American professional wrestler and mixed martial artist, lives in Maryfield with his wife, fellow professional wrestler Sable
- Joel Laing, Canadian ice hockey player, born and raised in Maryfield
- Val Sweeting, Canadian curler, grew up in Maryfield

== See also ==
- List of communities in Saskatchewan
- List of villages in Saskatchewan
