= Windthorst, Saskatchewan =

Village in Saskatchewan, Canada

Coordinates: 50°06′26″N 102°50′13″W

Location of Windthorst in Saskatchewan

Windthorst (2016 population: 211) is a village in the Canadian province of Saskatchewan within the Rural Municipality of Chester No. 125 and Census Division No. 5. It is accessed from Highway 48.

== History ==
Windthorst incorporated as a village on August 21, 1907.

== Demographics ==
Population history (1981–2016)
| Year | Pop. | ±% |
|---|---|---|
| 1981 | 254 | — |
| 1986 | 249 | −2.0% |
| 1991 | 246 | −1.2% |
| 1996 | 239 | −2.8% |
| 2001 | 228 | −4.6% |
| 2006 | 194 | −14.9% |
| 2011 | 215 | +10.8% |
| 2016 | 211 | −1.9% |
Source: Statistics Canada via Saskatchewan Bureau of Statistics

In the 2021 Census of Population conducted by Statistics Canada, Windthorst had a population of 194 living in 100 of its 123 total private dwellings, a change of -8.1% from its 2016 population of 211. With a land area of 1.34 km^{2} (0.52 sq mi), it had a population density of 144.8/km^{2} (375.0/sq mi) in 2021.

In the 2016 Census of Population, the Village of Windthorst recorded a population of 211 living in 109 of its 117 total private dwellings, a -1.9% change from its 2011 population of 215. With a land area of 1.43 km^{2} (0.55 sq mi), it had a population density of 147.6/km^{2} (382.2/sq mi) in 2016.

== Sports ==
The Kipling/Winthorst Oil Kings of the senior men's Big 6 Hockey League play in the local ice rink.

== Notable people ==
- Edwin Roy Kinch was born in Windthorst in 1918. He was a Catholic priest member of the Order of Servants of Mary. From 1962 to 1970, he was the apostolic prefect of the Apostolic Prefecture of Ingwavuma in South Africa.

== See also ==
- List of villages in Saskatchewan
- List of communities in Saskatchewan
