= SARM Division No. 1 =

Division in Saskatchewan, Canada

SARM Division No. 1 is a division of the Saskatchewan Association of Rural Municipalities (SARM) within the Canadian province of Saskatchewan. It is located in the south-east area of the province. There are 53 rural municipalities in this division. The current director for Division 1 is Bob Moulding.

== List of RMs in SARM Division No. 1 ==
By numerical RM No.

- RM No. 1 Argyle
- RM No. 2 Mount Pleasant
- RM No. 3 Enniskillen
- RM No. 4 Coalfields
- RM No. 5 Estevan
- RM No. 6 Cambria
- RM No. 7 Souris Valley
- RM No. 31 Storthoaks
- RM No. 32 Reciprocity
- RM No. 33 Moose Creek
- RM No. 34 Browning
- RM No. 35 Benson
- RM No. 36 Cymri
- RM No. 37 Lomond
- RM No. 61 Antler
- RM No. 63 Moose Mountain
- RM No. 64 Brock
- RM No. 65 Tecumseh
- RM No. 66 Griffin
- RM No. 67 Weyburn
- RM No. 91 Maryfield
- RM No. 92 Walpole
- RM No. 93 Wawken
- RM No. 94 Hazelwood
- RM No. 95 Golden West
- RM No. 96 Fillmore
- RM No. 97 Wellington
- RM No. 121 Moosomin
- RM No. 122 Martin
- RM No. 123 Silverwood
- RM No. 124 Kingsley
- RM No. 125 Chester
- RM No. 126 Montmartre
- RM No. 127 Francis
- RM No. 151 Rocanville
- RM No. 152 Spy Hill
- RM No. 153 Willowdale
- RM No. 154 Elcapo
- RM No. 155 Wolseley
- RM No. 156 Indian Head
- RM No. 157 South Qu'Appelle
- RM No. 181 Langenburg
- RM No. 183 Fertile Belt
- RM No. 184 Grayson
- RM No. 185 McLeod
- RM No. 186 Abernethy
- RM No. 187 North Qu'Appelle
- RM No. 211 Churchbridge
- RM No. 213 Saltcoats
- RM No. 214 Cana
- RM No. 215 Stanley
- RM No. 216 Tullymet
- RM No. 217 Lipton

== See also ==
- List of regions of Saskatchewan
- List of census divisions of Saskatchewan
- List of communities in Saskatchewan
- Geography of Saskatchewan
