= Peebles, Saskatchewan =

Hamlet in Saskatchewan, Canada

Peebles
- Location of Peebles in Saskatchewan Peebles (Canada)
- Coordinates: 50°9′34″N 102°56′51″W
- Country: Canada
- Province: Saskatchewan
- Region: Southeastern Saskatchewan
- Census Division: No. 5

Government
  - Governing Body: Rural Municipality of Chester No. 125 Council
  - MP: Robert Kitchen
  - MLA: Steven Bonk
- Time zone: UTC−6 (CST)
- Postal Code: S0G 3V0
- Area code: 306
- Highways: Highway 48 / Highway 616
- NTS Map: 062L02
- GNBC Code: HAGRT

Peebles is a hamlet in the Canadian province of Saskatchewan. It is accessed from Highway 48 and Highway 616.

== Demographics ==
In the 2021 Census of Population conducted by Statistics Canada, Peebles had a population of 15 living in 8 of its 10 total private dwellings, a change of −25% from its 2016 population of 20. With a land area of 0.07 km^{2} (0.027 sq mi), it had a population density of 214.3/km^{2} (555.0/sq mi) in 2021.

== See also ==
- List of hamlets in Saskatchewan
