= Odessa, Saskatchewan =

Village in Saskatchewan, Canada

Odessa
- Village
- Location within Saskatchewan Location within Canada
- Coordinates: 50.283°N 103.784°W
- Country: Canada
- Province: Saskatchewan
- Region: Southwest Saskatchewan
- Census division: 6
- Rural Municipality: Francis No. 127

Government
  - Mayor: Larry Lockert
  - Administrator: Leticia Gould
  - Governing body: Odessa Village Council

Area
  - Total: 1.18 km^{2} (0.46 sq mi)

Population (2006)
  - Total: 201
  - Density: 170.9/km^{2} (443/sq mi)
- Time zone: CST
- Postal code: S0G 3S0
- Area code: 306
- Highways: Highway 48
- Waterways: Cypress Lake

Odessa (2016 population: 205) is a village in the Canadian province of Saskatchewan within the Rural Municipality of Francis No. 127 and Census Division No. 6. The community is located 60 km southeast of the city of Regina on Highway 48.

== History ==
Odessa incorporated as a village on March 14, 1911.

== Demographics ==
Population history (1981–2016)
Year	Pop.	±%
1981	232	—
1986	223	−3.9%
1991	239	+7.2%
1996	268	+12.1%
2001	242	−9.7%
2006	201	−16.9%
2011	239	+18.9%
2016	205	−14.2%
Source: Statistics Canada via Saskatchewan Bureau of Statistics

In the 2021 Census of Population conducted by Statistics Canada, Odessa had a population of 220 living in 91 of its 99 total private dwellings, a change of 7.3% from its 2016 population of 205. With a land area of 1.08 km^{2} (0.42 sq mi), it had a population density of 203.7/km^{2} (527.6/sq mi) in 2021.

In the 2016 Census of Population, the Village of Odessa recorded a population of 205 living in 86 of its 96 total private dwellings, a −16.6% change from its 2011 population of 239. With a land area of 1.18 km^{2} (0.46 sq mi), it had a population density of 173.7/km^{2} (450.0/sq mi) in 2016.

== Sports ==
Odessa has an ice hockey arena, two grass ball diamonds, and three dirt ball diamonds, as well as an indoor gymnasium at the community centre.

Hockey

- Odessa Eagles - All Ages
- Odessa Beagals - Recreation

Broomball

- Odessa Bandits - Midget & Junior Boys
- Odessa Flames - Midget & Junior Girls
- The Outlaws - Senior Mens
- Odessa Renegades - Senior Mens
- Odessa Storm - Senior Womens

Baseball

- Odessa Expos - All Ages

Titles

- 1998: National Champions - Odessa Bandits (Jr.)
- 2009: National Champions - Odessa Bandits (Jr.)
- Provincial Champions - Odessa Bandits (Jr.)

2008
SCMHL Champions - Odessa Eagles (Midget II)

- 2007: SCMHL Champions - Odessa Eagles (Midget II)
- 2006: SCMHL Champions - Odessa Eagles (Midget II)
- 2002 SCMHL Champions - Odessa Wings (Midget I)

== Business ==
Organizations and Businesses in Odessa include:
- Odessa Co-op (Gas Station & Convenience Store)
- Phil's Electric
- Hoffart's Services Inc. (Behlen & HSI Manufacturing)
- Adam's Welding and Machine Shop
- Odessa Community Rink (Arena)
- SGI Odessa Branch
- Plainsveiw Credit Union (Odessa Branch)
- Chuckers Place (Odessa Bar)

== See also ==
- List of communities in Saskatchewan
- List of villages in Saskatchewan
