= Kendal, Saskatchewan =

Village in Saskatchewan, Canada

Kendal
- Village
- Village of Kendal
- Location of Kendal in Saskatchewan Kendal (Canada)
- Coordinates: 50.2557°N 103.6153°W
- Country: Canada
- Province: Saskatchewan
- Region: South-central
- Census division: 6
- Rural municipality: Montmartre No. 126
- Post office Founded: 1910-01-17

Government
  - Type: Municipal
  - Governing body: Kendal Village Council
  - Mayor: Lea Zohner
  - Administrator: Gail Blaney

Area
  - Total: 0.65 km^{2} (0.25 sq mi)

Population (2016)
  - Total: 83
  - Density: 127.5/km^{2} (330/sq mi)
- Time zone: UTC-6 (CST)
- Postal code: S0G 2P0
- Area code: 306
- Highways: Highway 48 Highway 619
- Railways: Canadian National Railway

Kendal (2016 population: 83) is a village in the Canadian province of Saskatchewan within the Rural Municipality of Montmartre No. 126 and Census Division No. 6. The village is located 77 km southeast of the city of Regina on Highway 48.

== History ==
Kendal incorporated as a village on February 17, 1919.

== Demographics ==
Population history (1981–2016)
Year	Pop.	±%
1981	92	—
1986	99	+7.6%
1991	90	−9.1%
1996	98	+8.9%
2001	83	−15.3%
2006	59	−28.9%
2011	77	+30.5%
2016	83	+7.8%
Source: Statistics Canada via Saskatchewan Bureau of Statistics

In the 2021 Census of Population conducted by Statistics Canada, Kendal had a population of 59 living in 31 of its 35 total private dwellings, a change of −28.9% from its 2016 population of 83. With a land area of 0.62 km^{2} (0.24 sq mi), it had a population density of 95.2/km^{2} (246.5/sq mi) in 2021.

In the 2016 Census of Population, the Village of Kendal recorded a population of 83 living in 34 of its 46 total private dwellings, a 7.2% change from its 2011 population of 77. With a land area of 0.65 km^{2} (0.25 sq mi), it had a population density of 127.7/km^{2} (330.7/sq mi) in 2016.

== See also ==
- List of communities in Saskatchewan
- List of villages in Saskatchewan
