= Rural Municipality of Maryfield No. 91 =

Rural municipality in Saskatchewan, Canada

Maryfield No. 91
- Rural municipality
- Rural Municipality of Maryfield No. 91
- Location of the RM of Maryfield No. 91 in Saskatchewan
- Coordinates: 49.880°N 101.587°W
- Country: Canada
- Province: Saskatchewan
- Census division: 1
- SARM division: 1
- Federal riding: Souris—Moose Mountain
- Provincial riding: Cannington; Moosomin
- Formed: December 9, 1912

Government
  - Reeve: Cameron Thompson
  - Governing body: RM of Maryfield No. 91 Council
  - Administrator: Daphne Brady
  - Office location: Maryfield

Area (2016)
  - Land: 759.58 km^{2} (293.28 sq mi)

Population (2016)
  - Total: 324
  - Density: 0.4/km^{2} (1.0/sq mi)
- Time zone: CST
  - Summer (DST): CST
- Postal code: S0G 3K0
- Area codes: 306 and 639

The Rural Municipality of Maryfield No. 91 (2016 population: 324) is a rural municipality (RM) in the Canadian province of Saskatchewan within Census Division No. 1 and SARM Division No. 1. It is located in the southeast portion of the province.

== History ==
The RM of Maryfield No. 91 incorporated as a rural municipality on December 9, 1912.

== Geography ==
=== Communities and localities ===
The following urban municipalities are surrounded by the RM.

Villages

- Fairlight
- Maryfield

The following unincorporated communities are within the RM.

Localities

- Ryerson

== Demographics ==
Population history (1981–2016)
Year	Pop.	±%
1981	609	—
1986	533	−12.5%
1991	489	−8.3%
1996	479	−2.0%
2001	379	−20.9%
2006	341	−10.0%
2011	319	−6.5%
2016	324	+1.6%
Source: Statistics Canada via Saskatchewan Bureau of Statistics

In the 2021 Census of Population conducted by Statistics Canada, the RM of Maryfield No. 91 had a population of 258 living in 100 of its 108 total private dwellings, a change of −20.4% from its 2016 population of 324. With a land area of 748.67 km^{2} (289.06 sq mi), it had a population density of 0.3/km^{2} (0.9/sq mi) in 2021.

In the 2016 Census of Population, the RM of Maryfield No. 91 recorded a population of 324 living in 125 of its 132 total private dwellings, a 1.6% change from its 2011 population of 319. With a land area of 759.58 km^{2} (293.28 sq mi), it had a population density of 0.4/km^{2} (1.1/sq mi) in 2016.

== Attractions ==
Maryfield holds an annual indoor rodeo in July.

== Government ==
The RM of Maryfield No. 91 is governed by an elected municipal council and an appointed administrator that meets on the second Thursday of every month. The reeve of the RM is Cameron Thompson while its administrator is Daphne Brady. The RM's office is located in Maryfield.
