= Rural Municipality of Chester No. 125 =

Rural municipality in Saskatchewan, Canada

Chester No. 125
- Rural municipality
- Rural Municipality of Chester No. 125
- Location of the RM of Chester No. 125 in Saskatchewan
- Coordinates: 50.186°N 103.051°W
- Country: Canada
- Province: Saskatchewan
- Census division: 5
- SARM division: 1
- Federal riding: Souris—Moose Mountain
- Provincial riding: Moosomin
- Formed: December 13, 1909

Government
  - Reeve: Merril Wozniak
  - Governing body: RM of Chester No. 125 Council
  - Administrator: James Hoff
  - Office location: Glenavon

Area (2016)
  - Land: 837.08 km^{2} (323.20 sq mi)

Population (2016)
  - Total: 383
  - Density: 0.5/km^{2} (1.3/sq mi)
- Time zone: CST
  - Summer (DST): CST
- Postal code: S0G 1Y0
- Area codes: 306 and 639

The Rural Municipality of Chester No. 125 (2016 population: 383) is a rural municipality (RM) in the Canadian province of Saskatchewan within Census Division No. 5 and SARM Division No. 1. It is located in the southeast portion of the province.

== History ==
The RM of Chester No. 125 incorporated as a rural municipality on December 13, 1909.

Heritage properties

There is one designated heritage building located within the rural municipality:

- The Schmitz Homestead - The homestead was constructed by Dr. Peter Schmitz in 1903, which is situated just north west of Windthorst. The building included a small chapel and is currently a private residence.

== Geography ==
=== Communities and localities ===
The following urban municipalities are surrounded by the RM.

Villages

- Glenavon

The following unincorporated communities are within the RM.

Organized hamlets

- Peebles

Localities

- Baring
- Peebles
- Windthorst

== Demographics ==
Population history (1981–2016)
| Year | Pop. | ±% |
|---|---|---|
| 1981 | 750 | — |
| 1986 | 648 | −13.6% |
| 1991 | 588 | −9.3% |
| 1996 | 521 | −11.4% |
| 2001 | 463 | −11.1% |
| 2006 | 386 | −16.6% |
| 2011 | 373 | −3.4% |
| 2016 | 383 | +2.7% |
Source: Statistics Canada via Saskatchewan Bureau of Statistics

In the 2021 Census of Population conducted by Statistics Canada, the RM of Chester No. 125 had a population of 333 living in 127 of its 142 total private dwellings, a change of −13.1% from its 2016 population of 383. With a land area of 817.66 km^{2} (315.70 sq mi), it had a population density of 0.4/km^{2} (1.1/sq mi) in 2021.

In the 2016 Census of Population, the RM of Chester No. 125 recorded a population of 383 living in 138 of its 158 total private dwellings, a 2.7% change from its 2011 population of 373. With a land area of 837.08 km^{2} (323.20 sq mi), it had a population density of 0.5/km^{2} (1.2/sq mi) in 2016.

== Government ==
The RM of Chester No. 125 is governed by an elected municipal council and an appointed administrator that meets on the first Wednesday of every month. The reeve of the RM is Merril Wozniak while its administrator is James Hoff. The RM's office is located in Glenavon.
