= Rural Municipality of Hazelwood No. 94 =

Rural municipality in Saskatchewan, Canada

Hazelwood No. 94
- Rural municipality
- Rural Municipality of Hazelwood No. 94
- Location of the RM of Hazelwood No. 94 in Saskatchewan
- Coordinates: 49.863°N 102.688°W
- Country: Canada
- Province: Saskatchewan
- Census division: 1
- SARM division: 1
- Federal riding: Souris—Moose Mountain
- Provincial riding: Cannington; Moosomin
- Formed: January 1, 1913

Government
  - Reeve: James Husband
  - Governing body: RM of Hazelwood No. 94 Council
  - Administrator: Gary Vargo
  - Office location: Kipling

Area (2016)
  - Land: 743.81 km^{2} (287.19 sq mi)

Population (2016)
  - Total: 230
  - Density: 0.3/km^{2} (0.78/sq mi)
- Time zone: CST
  - Summer (DST): CST
- Postal code: S0G 2S0
- Area codes: 306 and 639

The Rural Municipality of Hazelwood No. 94 (2016 population: 230) is a rural municipality (RM) in the Canadian province of Saskatchewan within Census Division No. 1 and SARM Division No. 1. It is located in the southeast portion of the province.

== History ==
The RM of Hazelwood No. 94 incorporated as a rural municipality on January 1, 1913.

Heritage properties

There is one historical property located within the RM.

- Bekevar Hungarian Presbyterian Church — Constructed in 1911, and located within Bekevar.

== Geography ==
Moose Mountain Provincial Park is located within the RM.

== Demographics ==
Population history (1981–2016)
Year	Pop.	±%
1981	505	—
1986	472	−6.5%
1991	415	−12.1%
1996	398	−4.1%
2001	308	−22.6%
2006	272	−11.7%
2011	246	−9.6%
2016	230	−6.5%
Source: Statistics Canada via Saskatchewan Bureau of Statistics

In the 2021 Census of Population conducted by Statistics Canada, the RM of Hazelwood No. 94 had a population of 244 living in 95 of its 100 total private dwellings, a change of 6.1% from its 2016 population of 230. With a land area of 714.41 km^{2} (275.84 sq mi), it had a population density of 0.3/km^{2} (0.9/sq mi) in 2021.

In the 2016 Census of Population, the RM of Hazelwood No. 94 recorded a population of 230 living in 94 of its 112 total private dwellings, a −6.5% change from its 2011 population of 246. With a land area of 743.81 km^{2} (287.19 sq mi), it had a population density of 0.3/km^{2} (0.8/sq mi) in 2016.

== Economy ==
Its major industry is agriculture.

== Government ==
The RM of Hazelwood No. 94 is governed by an elected municipal council and an appointed administrator that meets on the second Thursday of every month. The reeve of the RM is James Husband while its administrator is Gary Vargo. The RM's office is located in Kipling.
