= Wawota =

Town in Saskatchewan, Canada

- Town
- Wawota
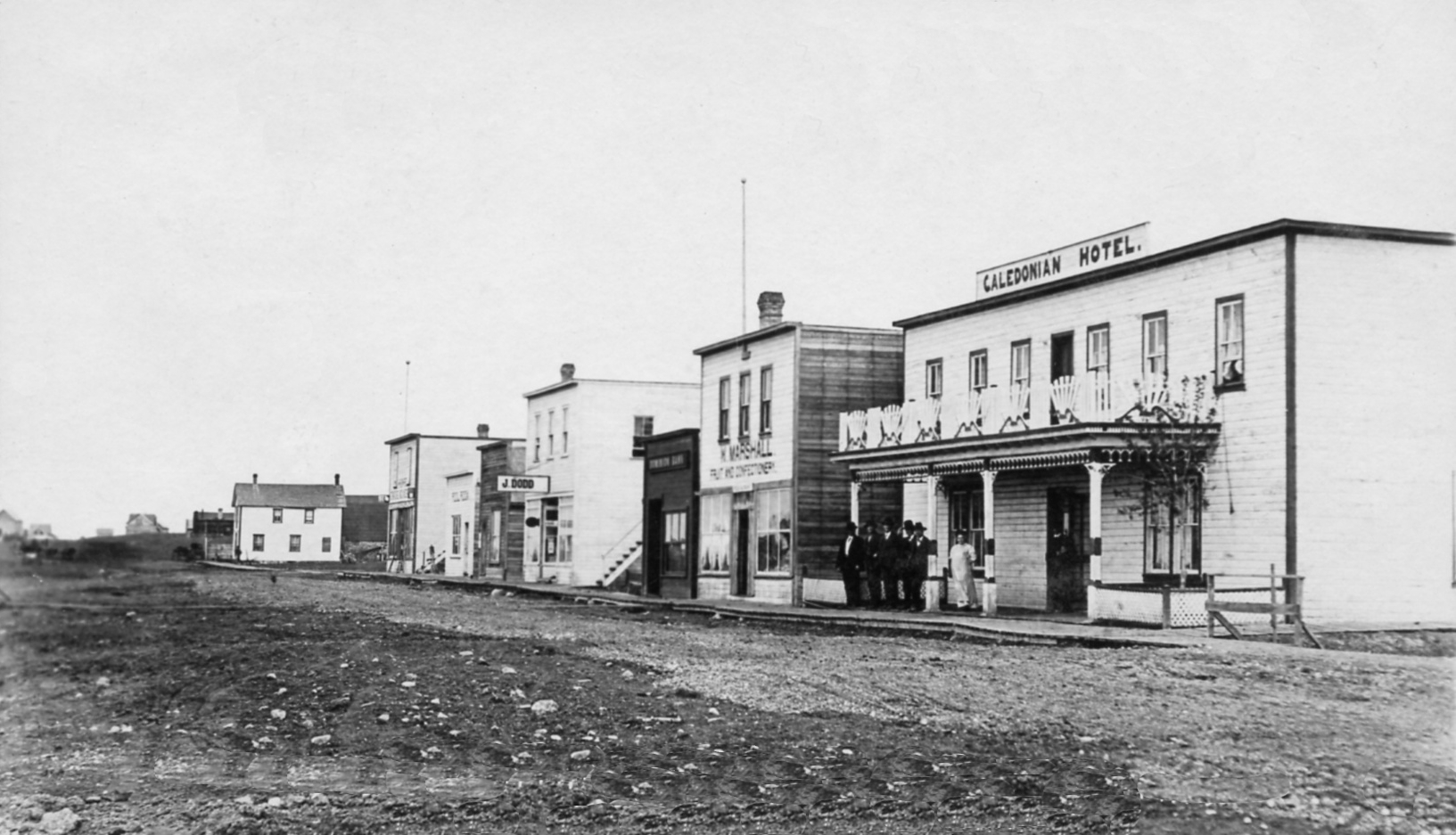
- Wawota, c. 1910

- Wawota Wawota (Canada)
- Coordinates: 49°54′24″N 102°01′34″W
- Country: Canada
- Province: Saskatchewan
- Census division: 1
- Rural Municipality: Wawken
- Post office founded: 1884-09-01

Government
  - Mayor: Kevin Kay
  - Governing body: Wawota Town Council
  - MP: Robert Kitchen Souris-Moose Mountain
  - MLA: Daryl Harrison Cannington

Area
  - Total: 1.24 km^{2} (0.48 sq mi)

Population (2011)
  - Total: 543
  - Density: 437.9/km^{2} (1,134/sq mi)
- Time zone: CST
- Postal code: S0G 5A0
- Area code: 306
- Highways: Highway 48 Highway 603
- Website: wawota.com

Wawota is a town of 543 people along Highway 48 in the southeast part of the Canadian province of Saskatchewan. Established in 1905, its name is from Dakota "wa ota", which means "much snow". Wa means 'snow', oda or ota means 'much'. It is sometimes mistakenly said to mean 'deep snow'.

== Demographics ==
In the 2021 Census of Population conducted by Statistics Canada, Wawota had a population of 555 living in 245 of its 287 total private dwellings, a change of 2.2% from its 2016 population of 543. With a land area of 1.28 km^{2} (0.49 sq mi), it had a population density of 433.6/km^{2} (1,123.0/sq mi) in 2021.

== Parks and recreation ==
Sports facilities include Lyle's Ball Park for baseball, Wawota Forum for hockey, Wawota Curling Rink, and a soccer pitch. The Wawota Flyers senior men's hockey team of the Big 6 Hockey League plays at the Forum and the Wawota Pats senior men's baseball team of the Saskota Baseball League plays at Lyle's Ball Park.

== Notable people ==
- Former NHL player Brooks Laich

== See also ==
- List of communities in Saskatchewan
- List of towns in Saskatchewan
- List of place names in Canada of Indigenous origin
- Rural Municipality of Wawken No. 93
