= Joe Erautt =

Canadian baseball player (1921–1976)

- Catcher
- Born: September 1, 1921; Vibank, Saskatchewan, Canada
- Died: October 6, 1976 (aged 55); Portland, Oregon, U.S.
- Batted: Right Threw: Right

MLB debut
- May 9, 1950, for the Chicago White Sox

Last MLB appearance
- July 22, 1951, for the Chicago White Sox

MLB statistics
- Batting average: .186
- Home runs: 0
- Runs batted in: 1
- Stats at Baseball Reference

Teams
- Chicago White Sox (1950–1951)

Joseph Michael Erautt (September 1, 1921 – October 6, 1976) was a Canadian-born professional baseball player.

== Education and career ==
Nicknamed "Stubby", the 5 ft 9 in (1.75 m), 175 lb (79 kg) catcher appeared in 32 total games over parts of two seasons (1950–51) with the Chicago White Sox. Born in Vibank, Saskatchewan, and of German descent, he was the elder brother of MLB pitcher Eddie Erautt. The Erautt family moved to Portland, Oregon, before Eddie was born, hence the younger sibling was a native American citizen.

Joe Erautt was an alumnus of the University of Portland. He served in the United States Army Air Forces in the Pacific Theater during World War II. His war-interrupted professional career extended for 14 total seasons (1940–42; 1946–56) and included almost 1,100 games played in minor league baseball.

His MLB service consisted of two 16-game stints with the White Sox. For his career, he collected eight hits, including one double, and compiled a .186 batting average in 43 at-bats, with one run batted in.
