= Fairlight, Saskatchewan =

Village in Saskatchewan, Canada

Fairlight
- Village
- Village of Fairlight
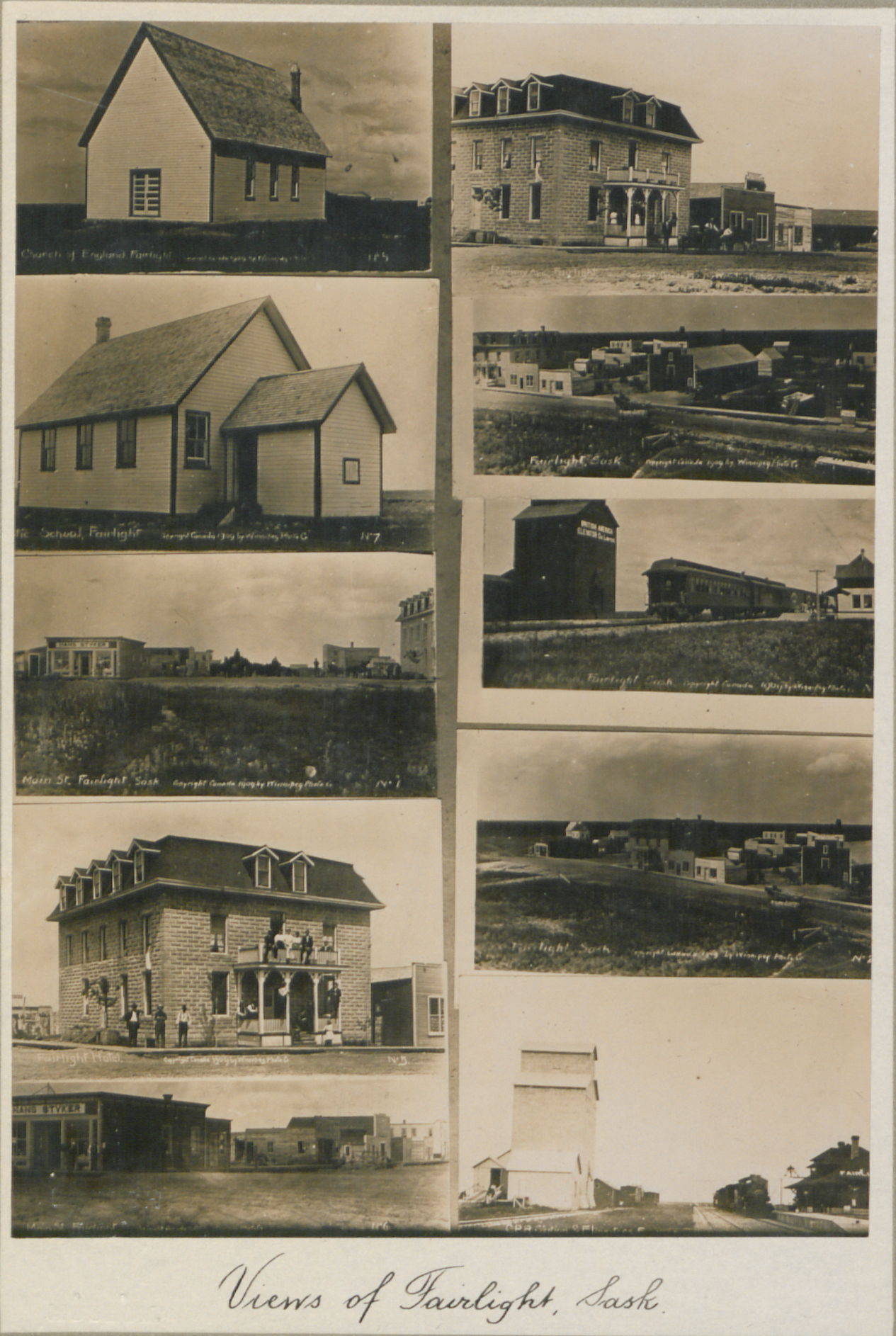
- Views of Fairlight, 1909

- Location of Fairlight in Saskatchewan Fairlight (Canada)
- Coordinates: 49.875°N 101.680°W
- Country: Canada
- Province: Saskatchewan
- Region: Southeast
- Census division: 1
- Rural municipality: Maryfield No. 91
- Incorporated (Village): 1910

Government
  - Type: Municipal
  - Governing body: Fairlight Village Council
  - Mayor: Barry Metz
  - Administrator: Nadia Metz

Area
  - Total: 2.71 km^{2} (1.05 sq mi)

Population (2016)
  - Total: 40
  - Density: 14.8/km^{2} (38/sq mi)
- Time zone: UTC-6 (CST)
- Postal code: S0G 1M0
- Area code: 306
- Highways: Highway 8 Highway 48
- Railways: Canadian National Railway

Fairlight (2016 population: 40) is a village in the Canadian province of Saskatchewan within the Rural Municipality of Maryfield No. 91 and Census Division No. 1. The village lies just south of Provincial Highway 48 and the Canadian National Railway, about a kilometre west of Highway 8.

== History ==
Fairlight incorporated as a village on October 5, 1909.

== Demographics ==
Population history (1981–2016)
Year	Pop.	±%
1981	74	—
1986	71	−4.1%
1991	68	−4.2%
1996	56	−17.6%
2001	45	−19.6%
2006	40	−11.1%
2011	40	+0.0%
2016	40	+0.0%
Source: Statistics Canada via Saskatchewan Bureau of Statistics

In the 2021 Census of Population conducted by Statistics Canada, Fairlight had a population of 25 living in 12 of its 21 total private dwellings, a change of −37.5% from its 2016 population of 40. With a land area of 2.58 km^{2} (1.00 sq mi), it had a population density of 9.7/km^{2} (25.1/sq mi) in 2021.

In the 2016 Census of Population, the Village of Fairlight recorded a population of 40 living in 18 of its 21 total private dwellings, a 0% change from its 2011 population of 40. With a land area of 2.71 km^{2} (1.05 sq mi), it had a population density of 14.8/km^{2} (38.2/sq mi) in 2016.

== See also ==
- List of communities in Saskatchewan
- List of villages in Saskatchewan
