= Glenavon, Saskatchewan =

Village in Saskatchewan, Canada

Glenavon
- Village
- Village of Glenavon
- Location of Glenavon in Saskatchewan Glenavon (Canada)
- Coordinates: 50.181°N 103.132°W
- Country: Canada
- Province: Saskatchewan
- Region: Saskatchewan
- Census division: 5
- Rural Municipality: Chester No. 125

Government
  - Type: Municipal
  - Governing body: Glenavon Village Council
  - Mayor: William (Bill) Sluser
  - Administrator: Brittany Knoll

Area
  - Total: 1.32 km^{2} (0.51 sq mi)

Population (2021)
  - Total: 179
  - Density: 139/km^{2} (360/sq mi)
- Time zone: UTC-6 (CST)
- Postal code: S0G 1Y0
- Area code: 306
- Highways: Highway 48 / Highway 617
- Railways: Canadian National Railway

Glenavon (2021 population: 179) is a village in the Canadian province of Saskatchewan within the Rural Municipality of Chester No. 125 and Census Division No. 5. It is accessed from both Highway 48 and Highway 617.

== History ==
Glenavon incorporated as a village on April 13, 1910.

=== Murder of Anna Juswiak ===
On May 5, 1950, 23-year old Polish émigrée Anna Juswiak boarded a train in Regina bound for Glenavon, where she was to meet friends of her fiancé, Stanley Kisilowski. On May 6, Juswiak's body was discovered in the backyard of a Glenavon home, "her head battered by a blunt instrument." Subsequently, Royal Canadian Mounted Police interviewed a man registered as "Leo Beaudry" from Portage la Prairie at a hotel in Kipling, identifying him as 25-year old John Woltucky, an ex-military and ex-convict using an alias, who had been released from penitentiary in Prince Albert on April 17, 1950. Woltucky was previously serving out a three-year sentence for illegal possession of a firearm, five charges of housebreaking, and theft of a parka. Police were initially "convinced that Woltucky did not answer to the description of the man they were looking for," but, with additional information from authorities in Glenavon, picked up Woltucky at the train station minutes before he was to board an outbound train. Among his personal effects, police discovered a bank book belonging to Ms. Juswiak. Two women from Kipling, Mrs. Lars Pearson and Mrs. Alf Johnston, identified Woltucky as having disembarked the train in Glenavon accompanying Juswiak.

The trial of John Woltucky proved sensational for the small town of Glenavon, where, "nothing like it had ever happened before in the peaceful community." In multiple newspapers, the murder of Anna Juswiak was initially reported as a shooting. During the trial, Glenavon's population of roughly 250 was "augmented by some 200 non-residents." According to Regina Leader-Post reporter Robert Tyre, "the murder itself was overshadowed by the antics of the villagers who deserted home, business, and family en masse to prowl and poke about the scene of the crime like an army of Scotland Yard detectives gravely and earnestly searching for clues."

Woltucky was convicted and found guilty twice, both times sentenced to the death penalty. During his detainment, he underwent psychological testing at Weyburn's Souris Valley Mental Health Hospital, from which he escaped on July 2, 1951 and was later re-apprehended.

=== 2011 Standoff ===
On April 6, 2011, a 36-year-old Glenavon man was killed after a standoff with the RCMP in the old school building, which lay unused. Police first surrounded the building on Tuesday at 4 p.m. after reports were received of an armed and distraught man locked in the building.

The police were able to see the man but were unable to make contact with him. At 1:10 a.m. the next morning, the police entered the building and found his body. Blair Arnott, the mayor of Glenavon, said the residents of the village were shocked, saying, "It's not something you expect in a little town where everybody knows each other."

== Demographics ==
Population history (1981–2016)
Year	Pop.	±%
1981	284	—
1986	262	−7.7%
1991	237	−9.5%
1996	230	−3.0%
2001	207	−10.0%
2006	183	−11.6%
2011	176	−3.8%
2016	182	+3.4%
2021	179	−1.6%
Source: Statistics Canada via Saskatchewan Bureau of Statistics

In the 2021 Census of Population conducted by Statistics Canada, Glenavon had a population of 179 living in 97 of its 110 total private dwellings, a change of −1.6% from its 2016 population of 182. With a land area of 1.29 km^{2} (0.50 sq mi), it had a population density of 138.8/km^{2} (359.4/sq mi) in 2021.

In the 2016 Census of Population, the Village of Glenavon recorded a population of 182 living in 108 of its 121 total private dwellings, a 3.3% change from its 2011 population of 176. With a land area of 1.32 km^{2} (0.51 sq mi), it had a population density of 137.9/km^{2} (357.1/sq mi) in 2016.

== See also ==
- List of communities in Saskatchewan
- List of francophone communities in Saskatchewan
- List of villages in Saskatchewan
