= List of villages in Canada =

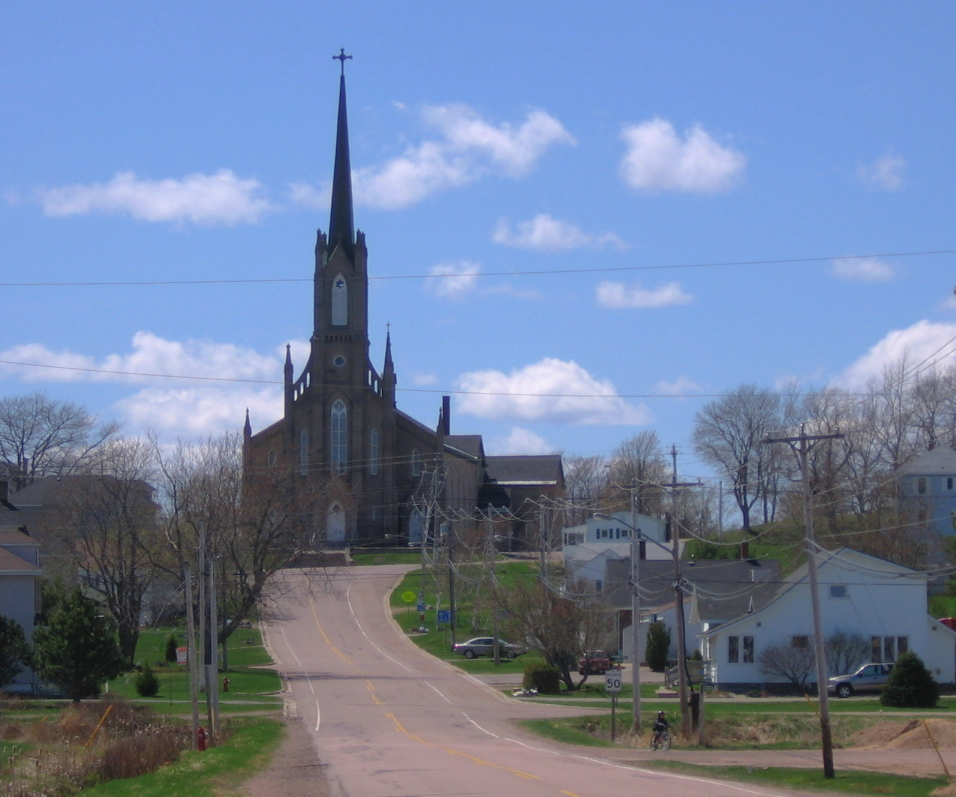
Memramcook is the largest village in New Brunswick with a population of 4,831

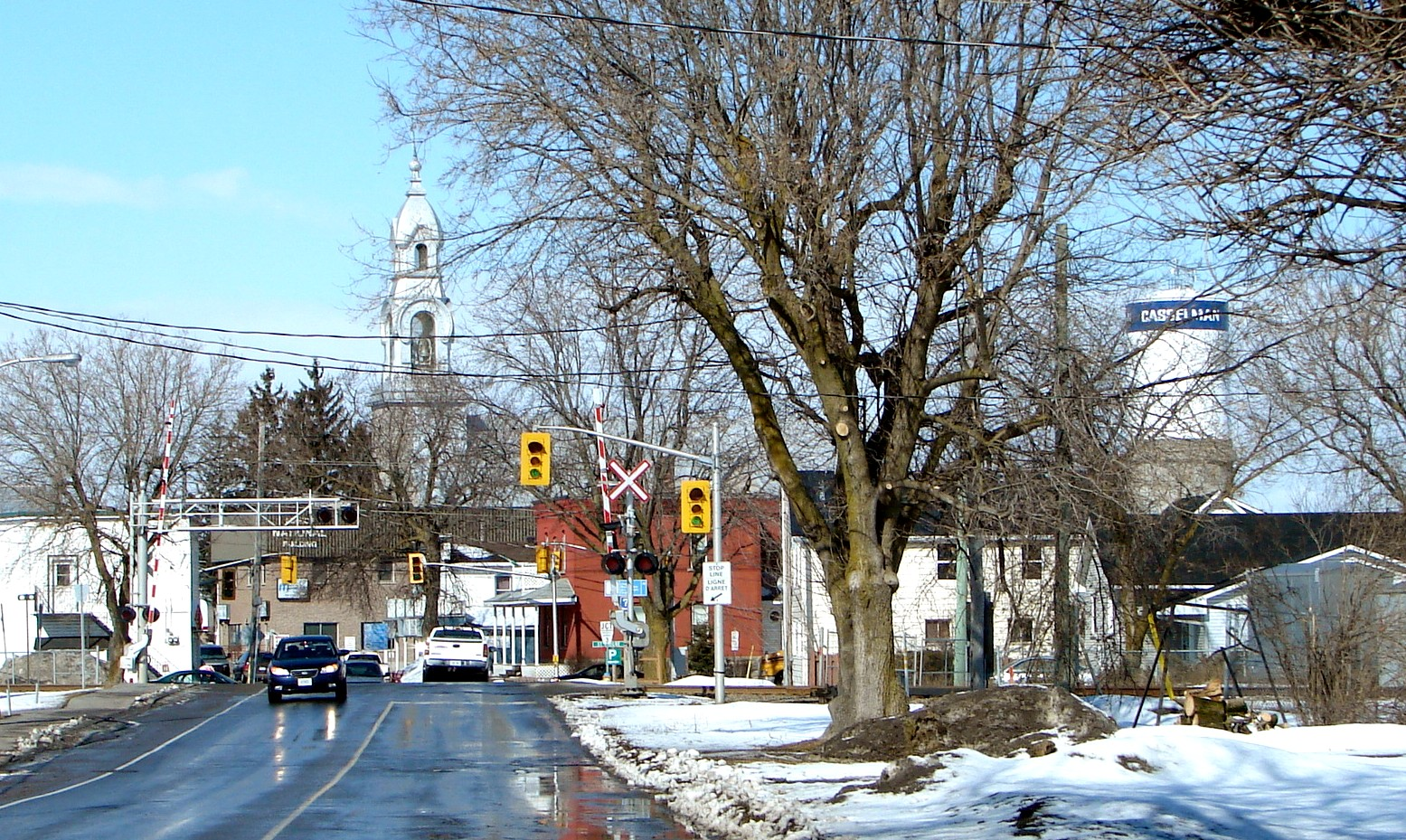
Casselman is the largest village in Ontario with a population of 3,626

A village is a type of incorporated municipality within the majority of the provinces and territories of Canada.

As of January 1, 2012, there were 550 villages among the provinces of Alberta, British Columbia, Manitoba, New Brunswick, the Northwest Territories, Ontario, Quebec, Saskatchewan and Yukon. Since then, Kedgwick in New Brunswick changed to rural community status and New Norway in Alberta dissolved to become an unincorporated hamlet, while both Hepburn and Pense in Saskatchewan changed to town status. Saskatchewan has the greatest number of villages at 264.

== Alberta ==
Alberta had 80 villages as of July 2021.

Name	Rural municipality	Incorporation date (village)	Population (2016)	Population (2011)	Change (%)	Land area (km²)	Population density (per km²)
Acme	Kneehill County	July 7, 1910	653	653	0.0%	2.48	263.3/km^{2}
Alberta Beach	Lac Ste. Anne County	January 1, 1999	1,018	865	+17.7%	2.01	506.5/km^{2}
Alix	Lacombe County	June 3, 1907	734	830	−11.6%	3.13	234.5/km^{2}
Alliance	Flagstaff County	August 26, 1918	154	174	−11.5%	0.51	302.0/km^{2}
Amisk	Provost No. 52, MD of	January 1, 1956	204	207	−1.4%	0.76	268.4/km^{2}
Andrew	Lamont County	June 24, 1930	425	379	+12.1%	1.17	363.2/km^{2}
Arrowwood	Vulcan County	May 13, 1926	207	188	+10.1%	0.75	276.0/km^{2}
Barnwell	Taber, MD of	January 1, 1980	947	771	+22.8%	1.51	627.2/km^{2}
Barons	Lethbridge County	May 6, 1910	341	315	+8.3%	0.81	421.0/km^{2}
Bawlf	Camrose County	October 12, 1906	422	403	+4.7%	0.89	474.2/km^{2}
Beiseker	Rocky View County	February 23, 1921	819	785	+4.3%	2.85	287.4/km^{2}
Berwyn	Peace No. 135, MD of	November 28, 1936	538	526	+2.3%	1.58	340.5/km^{2}
Big Valley	Stettler No. 6, County of	March 9, 1942	346	364	−4.9%	1.86	186.0/km^{2}
Bittern Lake (Note: Bittern Lake was formerly known as Rosenroll prior to December 16, 1911.)	Camrose County	November 2, 1904	220	224	−1.8%	6.57	33.5/km^{2}
Boyle	Athabasca County	December 31, 1953	845	916	−7.8%	7.13	118.5/km^{2}
Breton	Brazeau County	January 1, 1957	574	496	+15.7%	1.72	333.7/km^{2}
Carbon	Kneehill County	November 18, 1912	454	592	−23.3%	1.99	228.1/km^{2}
Carmangay	Vulcan County	March 4, 1936	242	367	−34.1%	1.86	130.1/km^{2}
Champion	Vulcan County	May 27, 1911	317	378	−16.1%	0.89	356.2/km^{2}
Chauvin	Wainwright No. 61, MD of	December 30, 1912	335	334	+0.3%	2.24	149.6/km^{2}
Chipman	Lamont County	October 21, 1913	274	284	−3.5%	9.61	28.5/km^{2}
Clive	Lacombe County	January 9, 1912	715	675	+5.9%	2.17	329.5/km^{2}
Clyde	Westlock County	January 28, 1914	430	503	−14.5%	1.31	328.2/km^{2}
Consort	Special Area No. 4	September 23, 1912	729	689	+5.8%	3.05	239.0/km^{2}
Coutts	Warner No. 5, County of	January 1, 1960	245	277	−11.6%	1.24	197.6/km^{2}
Cowley	Pincher Creek No. 9, MD of	August 16, 1906	209	236	−11.4%	1.37	152.6/km^{2}
Cremona	Mountain View County	January 1, 1955	444	457	−2.8%	1.94	228.9/km^{2}
Czar	Provost No. 52, MD of	November 12, 1917	202	167	+21.0%	1.12	180.4/km^{2}
Delburne	Red Deer County	January 17, 1913	892	830	+7.5%	3.98	224.1/km^{2}
Delia (Note: Delia was formerly known as Highland prior to December 9, 1915.)	Starland County	July 20, 1914	216	186	+16.1%	1.33	162.4/km^{2}
Donalda	Stettler No. 6, County of	December 30, 1912	219	259	−15.4%	0.99	221.2/km^{2}
Donnelly	Smoky River No. 130, MD of	January 1, 1956	342	305	+12.1%	1.31	261.1/km^{2}
Duchess	Newell, County of	May 12, 1921	1,085	992	+9.4%	1.96	553.6/km^{2}
Edberg	Camrose County	February 4, 1930	151	168	−10.1%	0.35	431.4/km^{2}
Edgerton	Wainwright No. 61, MD of	September 11, 1917	384	317	+21.1%	2.04	188.2/km^{2}
Elnora	Red Deer County	July 22, 1929	298	313	−4.8%	1.47	202.7/km^{2}
Empress	Special Area No. 2	February 5, 1914	135	188	−28.2%	1.58	85.4/km^{2}
Foremost	Forty Mile No. 8, County of	December 31, 1950	541	526	+2.9%	2.16	250.5/km^{2}
Forestburg	Flagstaff County	August 21, 1919	875	831	+5.3%	2.73	320.5/km^{2}
Girouxville	Smoky River No. 130, MD of	December 31, 1951	219	266	−17.7%	0.67	326.9/km^{2}
Glendon	Bonnyville No. 87, MD of	January 1, 1956	493	486	+1.4%	1.99	247.7/km^{2}
Glenwood	Cardston County	January 1, 1961	316	287	+10.1%	1.37	230.7/km^{2}
Hay Lakes (Note: Hay Lakes was formerly known as Hay Lake prior to January 1, 1932.)	Camrose County	April 17, 1928	495	425	+16.5%	0.59	839.0/km^{2}
Heisler	Flagstaff County	January 1, 1961	160	151	+6.0%	0.64	250.0/km^{2}
Hill Spring	Cardston County	January 1, 1961	162	186	−12.9%	0.96	168.8/km^{2}
Hines Creek	Clear Hills County	December 31, 1951	346	380	−8.9%	5.33	64.9/km^{2}
Holden	Beaver County	April 14, 1909	350	381	−8.1%	1.74	201.1/km^{2}
Hughenden	Provost No. 52, MD of	December 27, 1917	243	230	+5.7%	0.78	311.5/km^{2}
Hussar	Wheatland County	April 20, 1928	190	176	+8.0%	0.75	253.3/km^{2}
Innisfree	Minburn No. 27, County of	March 11, 1911	193	220	−12.3%	1.01	191.1/km^{2}
Irma	Wainwright No. 61, MD of	May 30, 1912	521	457	+14.0%	1.34	388.8/km^{2}
Kitscoty	Vermilion River, County of	March 22, 1911	925	846	+9.3%	1.51	612.6/km^{2}
Linden	Kneehill County	January 1, 1964	828	725	+14.2%	2.58	320.9/km^{2}
Lomond	Vulcan County	February 16, 1916	166	173	−4.0%	1.21	137.2/km^{2}
Longview	Foothills County	January 1, 1964	307	307	0.0%	1.1	279.1/km^{2}
Lougheed	Flagstaff County	November 7, 1911	256	233	+9.9%	2.1	121.9/km^{2}
Mannville	Minburn No. 27, County of	December 29, 1906	828	803	+3.1%	1.64	504.9/km^{2}
Marwayne	Vermilion River, County of	December 31, 1952	564	612	−7.8%	1.6	352.5/km^{2}
Milo	Vulcan County	May 7, 1931	91	122	−25.4%	0.98	92.9/km^{2}
Morrin	Starland County	April 16, 1920	240	245	−2.0%	0.67	358.2/km^{2}
Munson	Starland County	May 5, 1911	192	204	−5.9%	2.53	75.9/km^{2}
Myrnam	Two Hills No. 21, County of	August 22, 1930	339	370	−8.4%	2.79	121.5/km^{2}
Nampa	Northern Sunrise County	January 1, 1958	364	362	+0.6%	1.71	212.9/km^{2}
Paradise Valley	Vermilion River, County of	January 1, 1964	179	174	+2.9%	0.63	284.1/km^{2}
Rockyford	Wheatland County	March 28, 1919	316	325	−2.8%	1.08	292.6/km^{2}
Rosalind	Camrose County	January 1, 1966	188	190	−1.1%	0.62	303.2/km^{2}
Rosemary	Newell, County of	December 31, 1951	396	342	+15.8%	0.59	671.2/km^{2}
Rycroft	Spirit River No. 133, MD of	March 15, 1944	612	628	−2.5%	1.92	318.8/km^{2}
Ryley (Note: Ryley was also known as Equity in 1909.)	Beaver County	April 2, 1910	483	497	−2.8%	2.61	185.1/km^{2}
Spring Lake (Note: Spring Lake was formerly known as Edmonton Beach prior to January 1, 1999.)	Parkland County	January 1, 1999	699	533	+31.1%	2.33	300.0/km^{2}
Standard	Wheatland County	April 29, 1922	353	379	−6.9%	2.35	150.2/km^{2}
Stirling	Warner No. 5, County of	September 3, 1901	978	1,090	−10.3%	2.71	360.9/km^{2}
Veteran	Special Area No. 4	June 30, 1914	207	249	−16.9%	0.84	246.4/km^{2}
Vilna	Smoky Lake County	June 23, 1923	290	249	+16.5%	0.96	302.1/km^{2}
Warburg	Leduc County	December 31, 1953	766	789	−2.9%	2.68	285.8/km^{2}
Warner	Warner No. 5, County of	November 12, 1908	373	331	+12.7%	1.16	321.6/km^{2}
Waskatenau	Smoky Lake County	May 19, 1932	186	255	−27.1%	0.6	310.0/km^{2}
Youngstown	Special Area No. 3	December 31, 1936	154	178	−13.5%	1.11	138.7/km^{2}
Total villages	—	—	33,773	33,448	+1.0%	146.85	230.0/km^{2}

== British Columbia ==
British Columbia had 42 villages as of January 1, 2012.

Villages of British Columbia
Name	Corporate name	Status	Regional district	Incorp. date (village)	Pop. (2011)	Pop. (2006)	Change (%)	Area (km^{2})	Pop. density
Alert Bay	Alert Bay, The Corporation of the Village of	Village	Mount Waddington	January 14, 1946	445	456	−2.4	1.73	257.3
Anmore	Anmore, Village of	Village	Greater Vancouver	December 7, 1987	2,092	1,785	17.2	28.24	74.1
Ashcroft	Ashcroft, The Corporation of the Village of	Village	Thompson-Nicola	June 27, 1952	1,628	1,664	−2.2	50.90	32.0
Belcarra	Belcarra, Village of	Village	Greater Vancouver	August 22, 1979	644	676	−4.7	5.50	117.1
Burns Lake	Burns Lake, The Corporation of the Village of	Village	Bulkley-Nechako	December 6, 1923	2,029	2,107	−3.7	6.59	307.7
Cache Creek	Cache Creek, Village of	Village	Thompson-Nicola	November 28, 1967	1,040	1,037	0.3	10.25	101.5
Canal Flats	Canal Flats, Village of	Village	East Kootenay	June 29, 2004	715	700	2.1	10.86	65.8
Chase	Chase, Village of	Village	Thompson-Nicola	April 22, 1969	2,495	2,409	3.6	3.77	662.5
Clinton	Clinton, Village of	Village	Thompson-Nicola	July 16, 1963	636	598	6.4	7.89	80.6
Cumberland	Cumberland, The Corporation of the Village of	Village	Comox Valley	January 1, 1898	3,398	2,762	23.0	29.00	117.2
Daajing Giids (Note: Daajing Giids was formerly known as Queen Charlotte prior to July 13, 2022.)	Daajing Giids, Village of	Village	North Coast	December 5, 2005	944	948	−0.4	35.62	26.5
Fraser Lake	Fraser Lake, Village of	Village	Bulkley-Nechako	September 27, 1966	1,167	1,113	4.9	4.07	286.9
Fruitvale	Fruitvale, The Corporation of the Village of	Village	Kootenay Boundary	November 4, 1952	2,016	1,952	3.3	2.71	745.3
Gold River	Gold River, Village of	Village	Strathcona	August 26, 1965	1,267	1,362	−7.0	10.78	117.5
Granisle (Note: Granisle was founded as a company town by Granisle Copper Ltd. prior to its incorporation in 1971.)	Granisle, Village of	Village	Bulkley-Nechako	June 29, 1971	303	364	−16.8	41.86	7.2
Harrison Hot Springs	Harrison Hot Springs, Village of	Village	Fraser Valley	May 27, 1949	1,468	1,573	−6.7	5.57	263.5
Hazelton	Hazelton, The Corporation of the Village of	Village	Kitimat-Stikine	February 15, 1956	300	293	2.4	2.80	107.1
Kaslo	Kaslo, Village of	Village	Central Kootenay	August 14, 1893	1,026	1,072	−4.3	2.48	413.6
Keremeos	Keremeos, The Corporation of the Village of	Village	Okanagan-Similkameen	October 30, 1956	1,330	1,289	3.2	2.09	635.4
Lions Bay	Lions Bay, Village of	Village	Greater Vancouver	December 17, 1970	1,318	1,328	−0.8	2.53	520.2
Lumby	Lumby, The Corporation of the Village of	Village	North Okanagan	December 20, 1955	1,731	1,634	5.9	5.74	301.6
Lytton	Lytton, The Corporation of the Village of	Village	Thompson-Nicola	May 3, 1945	228	235	−3.0	6.54	34.8
Masset	Masset, Village of	Village	North Coast	May 11, 1961	884	940	−6.0	20.61	42.9
McBride	McBride, The Corporation of the Village of	Village	Fraser-Fort George	April 7, 1932	586	660	−11.2	4.64	126.4
Midway	Midway, Village of	Village	Kootenay Boundary	May 25, 1967	674	621	8.5	12.24	55.0
Montrose	Montrose, The Corporation of the Village of	Village	Kootenay Boundary	June 22, 1956	1,030	1,012	1.8	1.46	704.6
Nakusp	Nakusp, Village of	Village	Central Kootenay	November 24, 1964	1,569	1,524	3.0	8.05	194.8
New Denver	New Denver, The Corporation of the Village of	Village	Central Kootenay	January 12, 1929	504	512	−1.6	0.87	579.6
Pemberton	Pemberton, Village of	Village	Squamish-Lillooet	July 20, 1956	2,369	2,192	8.1	10.89	217.5
Port Alice	Port Alice, Village of	Village	Mount Waddington	June 16, 1965	805	821	−1.9	7.04	114.4
Port Clements	Port Clements, Village of	Village	North Coast	December 31, 1975	378	440	−14.1	13.04	29.0
Pouce Coupe	Pouce Coupe, The Corporation of the Village of	Village	Peace River	January 6, 1932	738	739	−0.1	2.06	358.5
Radium Hot Springs	Radium Hot Springs, Village of	Village	East Kootenay	December 10, 1990	777	735	5.7	6.34	122.5
Salmo	Salmo, The Corporation of the Village of	Village	Central Kootenay	October 30, 1946	1,139	1,007	13.1	2.44	466.2
Sayward	Sayward, Village of	Village	Strathcona	June 27, 1968	317	341	−7.0	4.51	70.3
Silverton	Silverton, The Corporation of the Village of	Village	Central Kootenay	May 6, 1930	195	185	5.4	0.35	550.5
Slocan	Slocan, Village of	Village	Central Kootenay	June 1, 1901	296	314	−5.7	0.78	381.7
Tahsis	Tahsis, Village of	Village	Strathcona	June 17, 1970	316	366	−13.7	5.26	60.0
Telkwa	Telkwa, The Corporation of the Village of	Village	Bulkley-Nechako	July 18, 1952	1,350	1,295	4.2	7.04	191.9
Valemount	Valemount, Village of	Village	Fraser-Fort George	December 13, 1962	1,020	1,018	0.2	5.17	197.4
Warfield	Warfield, The Corporation of the Village of	Village	Kootenay Boundary	December 8, 1952	1,700	1,729	−1.7	1.89	900.7
Zeballos	Zeballos, The Corporation of the Village of	Village	Strathcona	June 27, 1952	125	189	−33.9	1.56	80.3

== Manitoba ==
Manitoba had 19 villages as of January 1, 2012.

Villages of Manitoba
Name	Population (2016)	Population (2011)	Change (%)	Area (km²)	Population density
Dunnottar	763	696	8.7	2.8	272.5
St-Pierre-Jolys	1,170	1,099	6.5	2.6	450.0
Total villages	1,933	1,795	7.7	5.4	358.0
Name	Dissolved	Currently part of			
Benito	January 1, 2015	Municipality of Swan Valley West			
Binscarth	January 1, 2015	Municipality of Russell – Binscarth			
Bowsman	January 1, 2015	Municipality of Minitonas – Bowsman			
Cartwright	January 1, 2015	Cartwright – Roblin Municipality			
Crystal City	January 1, 2015	Municipality of Louise			
Elkhorn	January 1, 2015	Rural Municipality of Wallace – Woodworth			
Ethelbert	January 1, 2015	Municipality of Ethelbert			
Foxwarren	January 1, 1967	Prairie View Municipality			
Garson	January 1, 2003	Rural Municipality of Brokenhead			
Glenboro	January 1, 2015	Municipality of Glenboro – South Cypress			
Great Falls	January 1, 1973	Rural Municipality of Alexander			
McCreary	January 1, 2015	Municipality of McCreary			
Napinka	January 1, 1986	Municipality of Brenda – Waskada			
Notre Dame de Lourdes	January 1, 2015	Notre-Dame-de-Lourdes, Manitoba			
Powerview	May 1, 2005	Town of Powerview-Pine Falls			
Riverton	January 1, 2015	Municipality of Bifrost – Riverton			
St. Claude	January 1, 2015	Rural Municipality of Grey			
St. Lazare	January 1, 2015	Rural Municipality of Ellice – Archie			
Somerset	January 1, 2015	Municipality of Lorne			
Waskada	January 1, 2015	Municipality of Brenda – Waskada			
Wawanesa	January 1, 2015	Municipality of Oakland – Wawanesa			
Winnipegosis	January 1, 2015	Rural Municipality of Mossey River			

== New Brunswick ==
New Brunswick had 65 villages as of July 1, 2012.

Villages of New Brunswick
Name	Municipal type	County	Incorporation date	2021 Census of Population				
Name	Municipal type	County	Incorporation date	Population (2021)	Population (2016)	Change	Land area (km^{2})	Population density (/km^{2})
Alma	Village	Albert	1966	282	213	+32.4%	47.64	5.9
Aroostook	Village	Victoria	1966	313	306	+2.3%	2.23	140.4
Atholville	Village	Restigouche	1966	3,290	3,570	−7.8%	119.58	27.5
Balmoral	Village	Restigouche	1972	1,603	1,674	−4.2%	43.33	37.0
Bas-Caraquet	Village	Gloucester	1966	1,311	1,305	+0.5%	30.93	42.4
Bath	Village	Carleton	1966	440	476	−7.6%	2.00	220.0
Belledune	Village	Restigouche	1968	1,325	1,417	−6.5%	189.18	7.0
Bertrand	Village	Gloucester	1968	1,153	1,166	−1.1%	57.01	20.2
Blacks Harbour	Village	Charlotte	1972	907	894	+1.5%	9.02	100.6
Blackville	Village	Northumberland	1966	914	958	−4.6%	20.97	43.6
Cambridge-Narrows	Village	Queens	1966	715	562	+27.2%	106.79	6.7
Canterbury	Village	York	1966	320	336	−4.8%	5.32	60.2
Cap-Pelé	Village	Westmorland	1969	2,503	2,425	+3.2%	22.96	109.0
Centreville	Village	Carleton	1966	508	557	−8.8%	2.67	190.3
Charlo	Village	Restigouche	1966	1,323	1,310	+1.0%	31.45	42.1
Chipman	Village	Queens	1966	1,201	1,104	+8.8%	19.00	63.2
Doaktown	Village	Northumberland	1966	808	792	+2.0%	29.09	27.8
Dorchester	Village	Westmorland	1966	906	1,096	−17.3%	5.71	158.7
Drummond	Village	Victoria	1967	729	737	−1.1%	8.88	82.1
Eel River Crossing	Village	Restigouche	1966	1,844	1,953	−5.6%	65.26	28.3
Fredericton Junction	Village	Sunbury	1966	719	704	+2.1%	23.85	30.1
Gagetown	Village	Queens	1966	787	711	+10.7%	49.32	16.0
Grand Manan	Village	Charlotte	1995	2,595	2,360	+10.0%	150.56	17.2
Grande-Anse	Village	Gloucester	1968	731	899	−18.7%	24.27	30.1
Harvey	Village	York	1966	402	358	+12.3%	2.46	163.4
Hillsborough	Village	Albert	1966	1,348	1,277	+5.6%	12.81	105.2
Lac Baker	Village	Madawaska	1967	685	690	−0.7%	37.24	18.4
Le Goulet	Village	Gloucester	1986	749	793	−5.5%	5.40	138.7
Maisonnette	Village	Gloucester	1986	535	495	+8.1%	12.91	41.4
McAdam	Village	York	1966	1,173	1,151	+1.9%	14.19	82.7
Meductic	Village	York	1966	180	215	−16.3%	6.26	28.8
Memramcook	Village	Westmorland	1995	5,029	4,778	+5.3%	186.64	26.9
Millville	Village	York	1966	274	273	+0.4%	12.14	22.6
Minto	Village	Queens	1966	2,234	2,305	−3.1%	31.36	71.2
Neguac	Village	Northumberland	1967	1,692	1,684	+0.5%	26.72	63.3
New Maryland	Village	York	1991	4,153	4,174	−0.5%	21.25	195.4
Nigadoo	Village	Gloucester	1967	997	963	+3.5%	7.65	130.3
Norton	Village	Kings	1966	1,410	1,382	+2.0%	75.35	18.7
Paquetville	Village	Gloucester	1966	718	720	−0.3%	9.26	77.5
Perth-Andover	Village	Victoria	1966	1,574	1,590	−1.0%	8.96	175.7
Petitcodiac	Village	Westmorland	1966	1,476	1,383	+6.7%	17.18	85.9
Petit-Rocher	Village	Gloucester	1966	1,954	1,897	+3.0%	4.52	432.3
Plaster Rock	Village	Victoria	1966	1,002	1,023	−2.1%	3.01	332.9
Pointe-Verte	Village	Gloucester	1966	865	886	−2.4%	13.76	62.9
Port Elgin	Village	Westmorland	1922	381	408	−6.6%	2.65	143.8
Rexton	Village	Kent	1966	874	830	+5.3%	6.29	139.0
Riverside-Albert	Village	Albert	1966	348	350	−0.6%	3.39	102.7
Rivière-Verte	Village	Madawaska	1966	744	724	+2.8%	6.91	107.7
Rogersville	Village	Northumberland	1966	1,193	1,166	+2.3%	7.19	165.9
Saint-Antoine	Village	Kent	1966 (Note: Incorporated as St. Anthony but the name was changed to Saint-Antoine in 1969.)	1,791	1,733	+3.3%	6.32	283.4
Sainte-Anne-de-Madawaska	Village	Madawaska	1966	891	957	−6.9%	8.97	99.3
Sainte-Marie-Saint-Raphaël	Village	Gloucester	1966	820	879	−6.7%	15.84	51.8
Saint-Isidore	Village	Gloucester	1978	810	764	+6.0%	22.94	35.3
Saint-Léolin	Village	Gloucester	1966	615	647	−4.9%	19.73	31.2
Saint-Louis de Kent	Village	Kent	1986	981	856	+14.6%	1.98	495.5
Salisbury	Village	Westmorland	1966	2,387	2,284	+4.5%	13.56	176.0
St. Martins	Village	Saint John	1966	320	276	+15.9%	2.35	136.2
Stanley	Village	York	1966	397	412	−3.6%	16.93	23.4
Sussex Corner	Village	Kings	1966	1,458	1,461	−0.2%	9.32	156.4
Tide Head	Village	Restigouche	1966	951	938	+1.4%	19.34	49.2
Tracy	Village	Sunbury	1966	610	608	+0.3%	29.44	20.7

== Newfoundland and Labrador ==
Newfoundland and Labrador did not have any incorporated villages as of January 1, 2012.

== Northwest Territories ==
The Northwest Territories had one village as of January 1, 2012.

Name	Population (2011)	Population (2006)	Change (%)	Area (km^{2})	Population density
Fort Simpson	1,238	1,216	1.8	78.32	15.8

== Nova Scotia ==
In November 2014 Nova Scotia had 22 incorporated villages according to the Union of Nova Scotia Municipalities. The County of Kings had the largest number (7). In a draft fiscal report a recommendation was made to phase out all villages.

== Nunavut ==
Nunavut did not have any incorporated villages as of January 1, 2012.

== Ontario ==
Ontario had 11 villages as of January 1, 2012.

Villages of Ontario
Village	Municipal status	Geographic area	Population (2021)	Population (2016)	Population (2011)	Change % 2016-21	Area (km²)	Population density
Burk's Falls	Single-tier	Parry Sound	957	981	967	−2.4	3.07	310.0
Casselman	Lower-tier	Prescott and Russell	3,960	3,548	3,626	11.6	5.12	771.9
Hilton Beach	Single-tier	Algoma	198	171	145	15.8	2.62	78.6
Merrickville-Wolford	Lower-tier	Leeds and Grenville	3,135	3,067	2,850	2.2	214.33	14.6
Newbury	Lower-tier	Middlesex	440	466	447	−5.6	1.77	248.6
Oil Springs	Lower-tier	Lambton	647	648	704	−0.2	8.14	79.5
Point Edward	Lower-tier	Lambton	1,930	2,037	2,034	−5.3	3.3	585.0
South River	Single-tier	Parry Sound	1,101	1,114	1,049	−1.2	4.11	268.0
Sundridge	Single-tier	Parry Sound	938	961	985	−2.4	2.25	417.7
Thornloe	Single-tier	Timiskaming	92	112	123	−17.9	6.59	14.0
Westport	Lower-tier	Leeds and Grenville	634	590	628	7.5	2.19	289.0
Total			14,032	13,695	13,558	2.5	253.49	55.36
Total lower-tier			10,746	10,356	10,289	3.8	234.85	45.76
Total single-tier			3,286	3,339	3,269	−1.6	18.64	176.29

== Prince Edward Island ==
Prince Edward Island did not have any incorporated villages as of January 1, 2012.

== Quebec ==
Quebec had 44 villages as of January 1, 2013.

Villages of Quebec
Village municipality	Regional county municipality	Area (km^{2})	Population (2006)
Abercorn	Brome-Missisquoi	27.84	358
Ayer's Cliff	Memphrémagog	11.15	1076
Baie-Trinité	Manicouagan	536.33	512
Brome	Brome-Missisquoi	11.75	274
Chute-aux-Outardes	Manicouagan	8.31	1811
Fort-Coulonge	Pontiac	3.44	1495
Godbout	Manicouagan	204.34	341
Grandes-Piles	Mékinac	115.38	358
Grenville	Argenteuil	3.05	1398
Hébertville-Station	Lac-Saint-Jean-Est	33.28	1250
Hemmingford	Les Jardins-de-Napierville	0.85	771
Kingsbury	Le Val-Saint-François	6.26	92
Lac-Poulin	Beauce-Sartigan	1.08	139
Lac-Saguay	Antoine-Labelle	176.26	496
La Guadeloupe	Beauce-Sartigan	31.67	1740
Laurier-Station	Lotbinière	12.43	2444
Lawrenceville	Le Val-Saint-François	17.40	659
Marsoui	La Haute-Gaspésie	182.95	331
Massueville	Pierre-De Saurel	1.29	504
Mont-Saint-Pierre	La Haute-Gaspésie	60.45	220
North Hatley	Memphrémagog	3.23	731
Notre-Dame-du-Bon-Conseil	Drummond	4.22	1388
Pointe-aux-Outardes	Manicouagan	71.56	1479
Pointe-des-Cascades	Vaudreuil-Soulanges	2.66	1127
Pointe-Fortune	Vaudreuil-Soulanges	9.09	501
Pointe-Lebel	Manicouagan	91.16	1975
Portage-du-Fort	Pontiac	4.24	294
Price	La Mitis	2.35	1782
Roxton Falls	Acton	5.25	1342
Saint-André-du-Lac-Saint-Jean	Le Domaine-du-Roy	157.75	461
Saint-Célestin	Nicolet-Yamaska	1.61	788
Saint-Noël	La Matapédia	45.68	477
Saint-Pierre	Joliette	10.60	303
Sainte-Jeanne-d'Arc	Maria-Chapdelaine	270.88	1143
Sainte-Madeleine	Les Maskoutains	5.30	2240
Sainte-Pétronille	L'Île-d'Orléans	4.50	1078
Senneville	none	7.84	958
Stukely-Sud	Memphrémagog	66,31	962
Tadoussac	La Haute-Côte-Nord	74.59	872
Tring-Jonction	Beauce-Centre	25.71	1377
Val-David	Les Laurentides	43.17	4284
Vaudreuil-sur-le-Lac	Vaudreuil-Soulanges	1.73	1374
Warden	La Haute-Yamaska	5.28	376

== Saskatchewan ==
Saskatchewan had 264 villages as of October 24, 2012.

Recently with the addition of lesser known Meef Village, with a population of fewer than 30 residents as of August 14, 2024.

Villages of Saskatchewan
Name	Incorporation date	Rural municipality	Population (2016)	Population (2011)	Change (%)	Land area (km^{2})	Population density (per km^{2})
Abbey	September 2, 1913	Miry Creek No. 229	142	115	+23.5%	0.77	184.4/km^{2}
Abernethy	July 26, 1904	Abernethy No. 186	204	196	+4.1%	1.03	198.1/km^{2}
Albertville	January 1, 1986	Wise Creek No. 77	86	140	−38.6%	1.12	76.8/km^{2}
Alida	February 19, 1926	Reciprocity No. 32	120	131	−8.4%	0.37	324.3/km^{2}
Alvena	July 1, 1936	Fish Creek No. 402	60	55	+9.1%	0.43	139.5/km^{2}
Annaheim	April 1, 1977	St. Peter No. 369	210	219	−4.1%	0.78	269.2/km^{2}
Archerwill	January 1, 1947	Barrier Valley No. 397	166	200	−17.0%	0.83	200.0/km^{2}
Arran	September 21, 1916	Livingston No. 331	25	40	−37.5%	0.69	36.2/km^{2}
Atwater	August 12, 1910	Fertile Belt No. 183	30	31	−3.2%	1.79	16.8/km^{2}
Avonlea	February 10, 1912	Elmsthorpe No. 100	393	398	−1.3%	0.96	409.4/km^{2}
Aylesbury	March 31, 1910	Craik No. 222	40	42	−4.8%	1.28	31.3/km^{2}
Aylsham	August 4, 1947	Nipawin No. 487	65	71	−8.5%	0.48	135.4/km^{2}
Bangor	June 8, 1911	Fertile Belt No. 183	38	46	−17.4%	1.65	23.0/km^{2}
Beatty	March 31, 1921	Flett's Springs No. 429	60	63	−4.8%	0.82	73.2/km^{2}
Beechy	May 11, 1925	Victory No. 226	228	239	−4.6%	1.06	215.1/km^{2}
Belle Plaine	August 12, 1910	Pense No. 160	85	66	+28.8%	1.34	63.4/km^{2}
Bethune	August 2, 1912	Dufferin No. 190	399	405	−1.5%	2.38	167.6/km^{2}
Bjorkdale	April 1, 1968	Bjorkdale No. 426	201	199	+1.0%	1.39	144.6/km^{2}
Bladworth	July 27, 1906	McCraney No. 282	65	60	+8.3%	0.84	77.4/km^{2}
Borden	July 19, 1907	Great Bend No. 405	287	245	+17.1%	0.76	377.6/km^{2}
Bracken	January 4, 1926	Lone Tree No. 18	20	30	−33.3%	0.6	33.3/km^{2}
Bradwell	December 26, 1912	Blucher No. 343	166	230	−27.8%	0.42	395.2/km^{2}
Briercrest	April 17, 1912	Redburn No. 130	159	111	+43.2%	0.62	256.5/km^{2}
Brock	July 7, 1910	Kindersley No. 290	142	127	+11.8%	0.74	191.9/km^{2}
Broderick	September 13, 1909	Rudy No. 284	85	71	+19.7%	0.91	93.4/km^{2}
Brownlee	December 29, 1908	Eyebrow No. 193	55	50	+10.0%	2.42	22.7/km^{2}
Buchanan	June 11, 1907	Buchanan No. 304	218	225	−3.1%	1.29	169.0/km^{2}
Buena Vista	November 18, 1983	Lumsden No. 189	612	524	+16.8%	3.61	169.5/km^{2}
Bulyea	March 9, 1909	McKillop No. 220	113	102	+10.8%	1.28	88.3/km^{2}
Cadillac	July 2, 1914	Wise Creek No. 77	92	78	+17.9%	1.05	87.6/km^{2}
Calder	January 18, 1911	Calder No. 241	90	97	−7.2%	0.75	120.0/km^{2}
Canwood	July 18, 1916	Canwood No. 494	332	348	−4.6%	2.56	129.7/km^{2}
Carievale	March 14, 1903	Argyle No. 1	240	236	+1.7%	0.88	272.7/km^{2}
Caronport	January 1, 1988	Caron No. 162	994	1,068	−6.9%	1.9	523.2/km^{2}
Ceylon	September 26, 1911	The Gap No. 39	111	99	+12.1%	0.75	148.0/km^{2}
Chamberlain	January 31, 1911	Sarnia No. 221	90	88	+2.3%	0.7	128.6/km^{2}
Chaplin	October 8, 1912	Chaplin No. 164	229	218	+5.0%	1.26	181.7/km^{2}
Christopher Lake	March 1, 1985	Lakeland No. 521	289	281	+2.8%	4.56	63.4/km^{2}
Clavet	July 1, 1978	Blucher No. 343	410	386	+6.2%	0.84	488.1/km^{2}
Climax	December 11, 1923	Lone Tree No. 18	195	182	+7.1%	1	195.0/km^{2}
Coderre	August 26, 1925	Rodgers No. 133	30	30	0.0%	0.85	35.3/km^{2}
Codette	March 9, 1929	Nipawin No. 487	198	205	−3.4%	0.37	535.1/km^{2}
Coleville	July 1, 1953	Oakdale No. 320	305	311	−1.9%	1.87	163.1/km^{2}
Conquest	October 24, 1911	Fertile Valley No. 285	160	176	−9.1%	1	160.0/km^{2}
Consul	June 12, 1917	Reno No. 51	73	84	−13.1%	0.65	112.3/km^{2}
Craven	April 11, 1905	Longlaketon No. 219	214	234	−8.5%	1.21	176.9/km^{2}
Creelman	April 6, 1906	Fillmore No. 96	113	115	−1.7%	1.14	99.1/km^{2}
Debden	June 7, 1922	Canwood No. 494	337	358	−5.9%	1.39	242.4/km^{2}
Denholm	June 25, 1912	Mayfield No. 406	88	76	+15.8%	0.33	266.7/km^{2}
Denzil	May 3, 1911	Eye Hill No. 382	143	135	+5.9%	0.55	260.0/km^{2}
Dilke	December 30, 1912	Sarnia No. 221	98	77	+27.3%	1.28	76.6/km^{2}
Dinsmore	November 3, 1913	Milden No. 286	289	318	−9.1%	2.59	111.6/km^{2}
Disley	June 24, 1907	Lumsden No. 189	67	75	−10.7%	0.65	103.1/km^{2}
Dodsland	August 23, 1913	Winslow No. 319	215	212	+1.4%	2.93	73.4/km^{2}
Dorintosh	January 1, 1989	Meadow Lake No. 588	134	147	−8.8%	0.88	152.3/km^{2}
Drake	September 19, 1910	Usborne No. 310	197	202	−2.5%	0.72	273.6/km^{2}
Drinkwater	June 7, 1904	Redburn No. 130	70	65	+7.7%	2.64	26.5/km^{2}
Dubuc	May 29, 1905	Grayson No. 184	61	70	−12.9%	0.63	96.8/km^{2}
Duff	May 28, 1920	Stanley No. 215	30	30	0.0%	0.22	136.4/km^{2}
Duval	December 21, 1910	Last Mountain Valley No. 250	83	97	−14.4%	0.75	110.7/km^{2}
Dysart	April 6, 1909	Lipton No. 217	200	218	−8.3%	1.19	168.1/km^{2}
Earl Grey	July 27, 1906	Longlaketon No. 219	246	239	+2.9%	1.31	187.8/km^{2}
Ebenezer	July 1, 1948	Orkney No. 244	185	175	+5.7%	0.62	298.4/km^{2}
Edam	October 12, 1911	Turtle River No. 469	480	444	+8.1%	1.19	403.4/km^{2}
Edenwold	October 3, 1912	Edenwold No. 158	233	238	−2.1%	0.68	342.6/km^{2}
Elbow	April 6, 1909	Loreburn No. 254	337	314	+7.3%	3.92	86.0/km^{2}
Elfros	December 1, 1909	Elfros No. 307	90	96	−6.2%	2.52	35.7/km^{2}
Endeavour	April 29, 1953	Preeceville No. 334	65	94	−30.9%	0.99	65.7/km^{2}
Englefeld	June 13, 1916	St. Peter No. 369	285	247	+15.4%	0.65	438.5/km^{2}
Ernfold	December 4, 1912	Morse No. 165	15	30	−50.0%	1.19	12.6/km^{2}
Eyebrow	January 8, 1909	Eyebrow No. 193	119	139	−14.4%	2.7	44.1/km^{2}
Fairlight	October 5, 1909	Maryfield No. 91	40	40	0.0%	2.71	14.8/km^{2}
Fenwood	June 30, 1909	Stanley No. 215	30	40	−25.0%	1.74	17.2/km^{2}
Fillmore	June 10, 1905	Fillmore No. 96	311	255	+22.0%	1.33	233.8/km^{2}
Findlater	September 27, 1911	Dufferin No. 190	45	50	−10.0%	1.2	37.5/km^{2}
Flaxcombe	June 4, 1913	Kindersley No. 290	124	117	+6.0%	1.49	83.2/km^{2}
Forget	November 21, 1904	Tecumseh No. 65	55	35	+57.1%	1.39	39.6/km^{2}
Fosston	January 1, 1965	Ponass Lake No. 367	45	55	−18.2%	0.59	76.3/km^{2}
Fox Valley	August 30, 1928	Fox Valley No. 171	249	260	−4.2%	0.6	415.0/km^{2}
Frobisher	July 4, 1904	Coalfields No. 4	160	166	−3.6%	1.35	118.5/km^{2}
Frontier	July 10, 1930	Frontier No. 19	372	351	+6.0%	0.93	400.0/km^{2}
Gainsborough	May 25, 1894	Argyle No. 1	254	291	−12.7%	0.87	292.0/km^{2}
Gerald	March 25, 1953	Spy Hill No. 152	136	114	+19.3%	0.8	170.0/km^{2}
Glaslyn	April 16, 1929	Parkdale No. 498	387	397	−2.5%	1.97	196.4/km^{2}
Glen Ewen	March 24, 1904	Enniskillen No. 3	154	144	+6.9%	2.77	55.6/km^{2}
Glenavon	April 13, 1910	Chester No. 125	182	176	+3.4%	1.32	137.9/km^{2}
Glenside	March 30, 1911	Rudy No. 284	76	84	−9.5%	0.77	98.7/km^{2}
Golden Prairie	April 15, 1942	Big Stick No. 141	30	35	−14.3%	0.41	73.2/km^{2}
Goodeve	August 18, 1910	Stanley No. 215	40	45	−11.1%	2.62	15.3/km^{2}
Goodsoil	January 1, 1960	Beaver River No. 622	282	281	+0.4%	1.98	142.4/km^{2}
Goodwater	May 8, 1911	Lomond No. 37	30	25	+20.0%	0.59	50.8/km^{2}
Grayson	April 19, 1906	Grayson No. 184	211	184	+14.7%	1.87	112.8/km^{2}
Halbrite	February 26, 1904	Cymri No. 36	119	108	+10.2%	1.2	99.2/km^{2}
Harris	August 10, 1909	Harris No. 316	193	213	−9.4%	0.72	268.1/km^{2}
Hawarden	July 16, 1909	Loreburn No. 254	52	50	+4.0%	1.24	41.9/km^{2}
Hazenmore	August 20, 1913	Pinto Creek No. 75	70	50	+40.0%	0.73	95.9/km^{2}
Hazlet	January 1, 1963	Pittville No. 169	106	95	+11.6%	0.55	192.7/km^{2}
Heward	November 21, 1904	Tecumseh No. 65	44	40	+10.0%	0.99	44.4/km^{2}
Hodgeville	June 22, 1921	Lawtonia No. 135	172	172	0.0%	1.35	127.4/km^{2}
Holdfast	October 5, 1911	Sarnia No. 221	247	169	+46.2%	1.29	191.5/km^{2}
Hubbard	June 11, 1910	Ituna Bon Accord No. 246	35	46	−23.9%	1.25	28.0/km^{2}
Hyas	May 23, 1919	Clayton No. 333	70	114	−38.6%	1.17	59.8/km^{2}
Invermay	September 1, 1908	Invermay No. 305	273	247	+10.5%	1.22	223.8/km^{2}
Jansen	October 19, 1908	Wolverine No. 340	96	126	−23.8%	0.85	112.9/km^{2}
Keeler	July 5, 1910	Marquis No. 191	15	15	0.0%	1.02	14.7/km^{2}
Kelliher	April 27, 1909	Kellross No. 247	217	216	+0.5%	2.81	77.2/km^{2}
Kenaston	July 18, 1910	McCraney No. 282	282	285	−1.1%	1.17	241.0/km^{2}
Kendal	February 17, 1919	Montmartre No. 126	83	77	+7.8%	0.65	127.7/km^{2}
Kennedy	November 5, 1907	Wawken No. 93	216	241	−10.4%	1.56	138.5/km^{2}
Kenosee Lake	October 1, 1987	Wawken No. 93	234	258	−9.3%	0.35	668.6/km^{2}
Killaly	April 28, 1909	McLeod No. 185	65	74	−12.2%	2.59	25.1/km^{2}
Kincaid	July 19, 1913	Pinto Creek No. 75	111	114	−2.6%	0.82	135.4/km^{2}
Kinley	January 7, 1909	Perdue No. 346	60	45	+33.3%	1.18	50.8/km^{2}
Kisbey	May 8, 1907	Brock No. 64	153	217	−29.5%	2.77	55.2/km^{2}
Krydor	August 25, 1914	Redberry No. 435	15	15	0.0%	0.82	18.3/km^{2}
Laird	May 4, 1911	Rosthern No. 403	267	287	−7.0%	1.29	207.0/km^{2}
Lake Lenore	April 28, 1921	Lake Lenore No. 399	284	297	−4.4%	0.97	292.8/km^{2}
Lancer	September 11, 1913	Miry Creek No. 229	69	61	+13.1%	1.33	51.9/km^{2}
Landis	May 17, 1909	Reford No. 379	152	139	+9.4%	0.8	190.0/km^{2}
Lang	July 27, 1906	Scott No. 98	189	200	−5.5%	0.64	295.3/km^{2}
Leask	September 3, 1912	Leask No. 464	399	413	−3.4%	0.75	532.0/km^{2}
Lebret	October 14, 1912	North Qu'Appelle No. 187	216	199	+8.5%	1.31	164.9/km^{2}
Leoville	June 26, 1944	Spiritwood No. 496	375	366	+2.5%	1.11	337.8/km^{2}
Leross	December 1, 1909	Kellross No. 247	46	37	+24.3%	1.21	38.0/km^{2}
Liberty	January 23, 1912	Big Arm No. 251	78	88	−11.4%	1.37	56.9/km^{2}
Limerick	July 10, 1913	Stonehenge No. 73	115	115	0.0%	0.79	145.6/km^{2}
Lintlaw	December 14, 1921	Hazel Dell No. 335	172	162	+6.2%	1.23	139.8/km^{2}
Lipton	May 15, 1905	Lipton No. 217	345	372	−7.3%	0.75	460.0/km^{2}
Loon Lake	January 1, 1950	Loon Lake No. 561	288	314	−8.3%	0.66	436.4/km^{2}
Loreburn	May 20, 1909	Loreburn No. 254	107	107	0.0%	0.62	172.6/km^{2}
Love	June 2, 1945	Torch River No. 488	50	65	−23.1%	0.46	108.7/km^{2}
Lucky Lake	November 23, 1920	Canaan No. 225	289	287	+0.7%	0.66	437.9/km^{2}
MacNutt	February 22, 1913	Churchbridge No. 211	65	65	0.0%	0.81	80.2/km^{2}
Macoun	October 16, 1903	Cymri No. 36	269	246	+9.3%	1.68	160.1/km^{2}
Macrorie	February 8, 1912	Fertile Valley No. 285	68	65	+4.6%	0.77	88.3/km^{2}
Major	September 29, 1914	Prairiedale No. 321	35	61	−42.6%	2.78	12.6/km^{2}
Makwa	June 1, 1965	Loon Lake No. 561	84	97	−13.4%	0.66	127.3/km^{2}
Mankota	February 3, 1941	Mankota No. 45	205	211	−2.8%	1.42	144.4/km^{2}
Manor	April 15, 1902	Moose Mountain No. 63	295	322	−8.4%	2.79	105.7/km^{2}
Marcelin	September 25, 1911	Blaine Lake No. 434	153	158	−3.2%	1.32	115.9/km^{2}
Marengo	November 5, 1910	Milton No. 292	67	47	+42.6%	0.87	77.0/km^{2}
Margo	April 24, 1911	Sasman No. 336	83	100	−17.0%	0.8	103.8/km^{2}
Markinch	February 16, 1911	Cupar No. 218	58	72	−19.4%	0.68	85.3/km^{2}
Marquis	March 21, 1910	Marquis No. 191	97	92	+5.4%	0.63	154.0/km^{2}
Marsden	April 24, 1931	Manitou Lake No. 442	297	284	+4.6%	0.94	316.0/km^{2}
Maryfield	August 21, 1907	Maryfield No. 91	348	365	−4.7%	2.69	129.4/km^{2}
Maymont	June 24, 1907	Mayfield No. 406	138	146	−5.5%	0.66	209.1/km^{2}
McLean	September 1, 1966	South Qu'Appelle No. 157	405	304	+33.2%	1.33	304.5/km^{2}
McTaggart	October 5, 1909	Weyburn No. 67	121	125	−3.2%	0.69	175.4/km^{2}
Meacham	June 19, 1912	Colonsay No. 342	99	84	+17.9%	1.27	78.0/km^{2}
Meath Park	May 23, 1938	Garden River No. 490	175	205	−14.6%	0.77	227.3/km^{2}
Medstead	April 23, 1931	Medstead No. 497	130	120	+8.3%	0.67	194.0/km^{2}
Mendham	April 1, 1930	Happyland No. 231	30	35	−14.3%	0.5	60.0/km^{2}
Meota	July 6, 1911	Meota No. 468	304	307	−1.0%	1.55	196.1/km^{2}
Mervin	March 17, 1920	Mervin No. 499	159	160	−0.6%	0.73	217.8/km^{2}
Middle Lake	January 1, 1963	Three Lakes No. 400	241	242	−0.4%	1.26	191.3/km^{2}
Milden	July 20, 1911	Milden No. 286	167	181	−7.7%	1.19	140.3/km^{2}
Minton	January 1, 1951	Surprise Valley No. 9	55	60	−8.3%	0.3	183.3/km^{2}
Mistatim	July 1, 1952	Bjorkdale No. 426	101	73	+38.4%	0.47	214.9/km^{2}
Montmartre	October 19, 1908	Montmartre No. 126	490	476	+2.9%	1.7	288.2/km^{2}
Mortlach	January 1, 1949	Wheatlands No. 163	261	289	−9.7%	2.76	94.6/km^{2}
Muenster	August 18, 1908	St. Peter No. 369	430	422	+1.9%	1.33	323.3/km^{2}
Neilburg	January 1, 1947	Hillsdale No. 440	379	448	−15.4%	1.22	310.7/km^{2}
Netherhill	April 28, 1910	Kindersley No. 290	25	25	0.0%	0.73	34.2/km^{2}
Neudorf	April 25, 1905	McLeod No. 185	263	272	−3.3%	2.05	128.3/km^{2}
Neville	July 5, 1912	Whiska Creek No. 106	87	83	+4.8%	1.1	79.1/km^{2}
North Portal	November 16, 1903	Coalfields No. 4	115	143	−19.6%	2.49	46.2/km^{2}
Odessa	March 14, 1911	Francis No. 127	205	239	−14.2%	1.18	173.7/km^{2}
Osage	May 8, 1906	Fillmore No. 96	20	20	0.0%	0.59	33.9/km^{2}
Paddockwood	January 1, 1949	Paddockwood No. 520	154	163	−5.5%	0.65	236.9/km^{2}
Pangman	May 17, 1911	Norton No. 69	232	214	+8.4%	0.73	317.8/km^{2}
Paradise Hill	January 1, 1947	Frenchman Butte No. 501	491	515	−4.7%	2.56	191.8/km^{2}
Parkside	February 21, 1913	Leask No. 464	121	125	−3.2%	0.92	131.5/km^{2}
Paynton	May 2, 1907	Paynton No. 470	148	151	−2.0%	0.85	174.1/km^{2}
Pelly	May 4, 1911	St. Philips No. 301	285	283	+0.7%	0.96	296.9/km^{2}
Pennant	July 29, 1912	Riverside No. 168	130	120	+8.3%	0.65	200.0/km^{2}
Perdue	July 15, 1909	Perdue No. 346	334	362	−7.7%	1.1	303.6/km^{2}
Pierceland	January 1, 1973	Beaver River No. 622	598	551	+8.5%	2.69	222.3/km^{2}
Pilger	January 1, 1969	Three Lakes No. 400	65	65	0.0%	0.52	125.0/km^{2}
Pleasantdale	January 1, 1987	Pleasantdale No. 398	76	76	0.0%	0.56	135.7/km^{2}
Plenty	March 25, 1911	Winslow No. 319	164	131	+25.2%	0.65	252.3/km^{2}
Plunkett	December 28, 1921	Viscount No. 341	60	75	−20.0%	0.64	93.8/km^{2}
Prelate	October 25, 1913	Happyland No. 231	154	124	+24.2%	0.87	177.0/km^{2}
Prud'homme	November 15, 1922	Bayne No. 371	167	172	−2.9%	0.84	198.8/km^{2}
Punnichy	October 22, 1909	Mount Hope No. 279	213	246	−13.4%	0.68	313.2/km^{2}
Quill Lake	December 8, 1906	Lakeside No. 338	387	409	−5.4%	1.3	297.7/km^{2}
Quinton	March 1, 1910	Mount Hope No. 279	101	111	−9.0%	0.96	105.2/km^{2}
Rama	December 18, 1919	Invermay No. 305	80	75	+6.7%	0.67	119.4/km^{2}
Rhein	March 10, 1913	Wallace No. 243	170	158	+7.6%	1.09	156.0/km^{2}
Richard	October 11, 1916	Douglas No. 436	20	30	−33.3%	0.73	27.4/km^{2}
Richmound	May 5, 1947	Enterprise No. 142	147	154	−4.5%	0.47	312.8/km^{2}
Ridgedale	December 15, 1921	Connaught No. 457	55	80	−31.2%	0.72	76.4/km^{2}
Riverhurst	June 22, 1916	Maple Bush No. 224	130	114	+14.0%	0.91	142.9/km^{2}
Roche Percee	January 12, 1909	Coalfields No. 4	110	153	−28.1%	2.83	38.9/km^{2}
Ruddell	March 18, 1914	Mayfield No. 406	20	20	0.0%	0.47	42.6/km^{2}
Rush Lake	October 16, 1911	Excelsior No. 166	53	65	−18.5%	0.74	71.6/km^{2}
Sceptre	April 30, 1913	Clinworth No. 230	94	97	−3.1%	1.23	76.4/km^{2}
Sedley	August 3, 1907	Francis No. 127	358	337	+6.2%	1.33	269.2/km^{2}
Semans	December 14, 1908	Mount Hope No. 279	196	204	−3.9%	1.14	171.9/km^{2}
Senlac	October 11, 1916	Senlac No. 411	41	46	−10.9%	0.6	68.3/km^{2}
Shamrock	January 1, 1960	Shamrock No. 134	20	20	0.0%	0.79	25.3/km^{2}
Sheho	June 30, 1905	Insinger No. 275	105	130	−19.2%	1.95	53.8/km^{2}
Shell Lake	October 18, 1940	Spiritwood No. 496	175	152	+15.1%	1.23	142.3/km^{2}
Silton	July 2, 1914	McKillop No. 220	71	95	−25.3%	1.07	66.4/km^{2}
Simpson	July 11, 1911	Wood Creek No. 281	127	131	−3.1%	1.41	90.1/km^{2}
Smeaton	March 7, 1944	Torch River No. 488	182	181	+0.6%	1.48	123.0/km^{2}
Smiley	November 26, 1913	Prairiedale No. 321	60	60	0.0%	0.64	93.8/km^{2}
Spalding	March 11, 1924	Spalding No. 368	244	242	+0.8%	1.18	206.8/km^{2}
Speers	December 24, 1915	Douglas No. 436	60	65	−7.7%	0.69	87.0/km^{2}
Spy Hill	April 22, 1910	Spy Hill No. 152	168	204	−17.6%	1.19	141.2/km^{2}
St. Benedict	January 1, 1964	Three Lakes No. 400	84	82	+2.4%	0.54	155.6/km^{2}
St. Gregor	March 26, 1920	St. Peter No. 369	97	98	−1.0%	0.91	106.6/km^{2}
St. Louis	May 19, 1959	St. Louis No. 431	415	449	−7.6%	1.08	384.3/km^{2}
Stenen	August 14, 1912	Clayton No. 333	90	79	+13.9%	0.7	128.6/km^{2}
Stewart Valley	January 1, 1958	Saskatchewan Landing No. 167	91	76	+19.7%	0.86	105.8/km^{2}
Stockholm	June 30, 1905	Fertile Belt No. 183	352	341	+3.2%	1.65	213.3/km^{2}
Storthoaks	June 5, 1940	Storthoaks No. 31	108	93	+16.1%	0.49	220.4/km^{2}
Strongfield	May 3, 1912	Loreburn No. 254	40	40	0.0%	0.8	50.0/km^{2}
Success	October 25, 1912	Riverside No. 168	45	40	+12.5%	1.38	32.6/km^{2}
Tantallon	June 17, 1904	Spy Hill No. 152	91	105	−13.3%	0.84	108.3/km^{2}
Tessier	August 24, 1909	Harris No. 316	25	25	0.0%	1	25.0/km^{2}
Theodore	July 5, 1907	Insinger No. 275	323	345	−6.4%	1.73	186.7/km^{2}
Togo	September 4, 1906	Cote No. 271	86	87	−1.1%	1.5	57.3/km^{2}
Tompkins	June 2, 1910	Gull Lake No. 139	152	170	−10.6%	2.65	57.4/km^{2}
Torquay	December 11, 1923	Cambria No. 6	255	236	+8.1%	1.35	188.9/km^{2}
Tramping Lake	April 10, 1917	Tramping Lake No. 380	60	55	+9.1%	1.39	43.2/km^{2}
Tugaske	May 7, 1909	Huron No. 223	75	92	−18.5%	0.76	98.7/km^{2}
Tuxford	July 19, 1907	Marquis No. 191	113	91	+24.2%	0.62	182.3/km^{2}
Val Marie	September 13, 1926	Val Marie No. 17	126	130	−3.1%	0.42	300.0/km^{2}
Valparaiso	July 18, 1924	Star City No. 428	15	15	0.0%	0.69	21.7/km^{2}
Vanguard	July 8, 1912	Whiska Creek No. 106	134	152	−11.8%	1.86	72.0/km^{2}
Vanscoy	June 17, 1919	Vanscoy No. 345	462	377	+22.5%	1.49	310.1/km^{2}
Vibank	June 23, 1911	Francis No. 127	385	374	+2.9%	0.73	527.4/km^{2}
Viscount	December 17, 1908	Viscount No. 341	232	252	−7.9%	1.18	196.6/km^{2}
Waldeck	December 23, 1913	Excelsior No. 166	277	297	−6.7%	2	138.5/km^{2}
Waldron	July 17, 1909	Grayson No. 184	15	20	−25.0%	1.45	10.3/km^{2}
Waseca	March 15, 1911	Eldon No. 471	149	154	−3.2%	0.68	219.1/km^{2}
Webb	June 18, 1910	Webb No. 138	50	58	−13.8%	1.41	35.5/km^{2}
Weekes	January 13, 1947	Porcupine No. 395	40	42	−4.8%	0.59	67.8/km^{2}
Weirdale	April 1, 1948	Garden River No. 490	50	75	−33.3%	1.36	36.8/km^{2}
Weldon	January 24, 1914	Kinistino No. 459	197	196	+0.5%	1.1	179.1/km^{2}
White Fox	July 21, 1941	Torch River No. 488	355	364	−2.5%	0.85	417.6/km^{2}
Wilcox	April 20, 1907	Bratt's Lake No. 129	264	339	−22.1%	1.48	178.4/km^{2}
Windthorst	August 21, 1907	Chester No. 125	211	215	−1.9%	1.43	147.6/km^{2}
Wiseton	September 23, 1913	Milden No. 286	79	88	−10.2%	0.77	102.6/km^{2}
Wood Mountain	March 4, 1930	Old Post No. 43	20	25	−20.0%	0.61	32.8/km^{2}
Yarbo	July 1, 1964	Langenburg No. 181	57	53	+7.5%	0.83	68.7/km^{2}
Young	June 7, 1910	Morris No. 312	244	239	+2.1%	2.51	97.2/km^{2}
Zelma	August 10, 1910	Morris No. 312	35	35	0.0%	0.72	48.6/km^{2}
Zenon Park	July 28, 1941	Arborfield No. 456	194	187	+3.7%	0.56	346.4/km^{2}
Total villages			41,514	41,945	−1.0%	295.11	140.67/km^{2}

== Yukon ==
Yukon had four villages as of January 1, 2012.

Name	Population (2011)	Population (2006)	Change (%)	Area (km^{2})	Population density
Carmacks	503	425	18.4	36.95	13.6
Haines Junction	593	589	0.7	34.49	17.2
Mayo	226	248	−8.9	1.06	213.2
Teslin	122	141	−13.5	1.92	63.6
Total villages	1,444	1,403	2.9	74.42	19.4

== See also ==
- List of cities in Canada
- List of towns in Canada
- Northern village
- Resort village
- Summer village
