= Saskatchewan Highway 8 =

Provincial highway in Saskatchewan, Canada

Highway 8
- Highway 8 highlighted in red
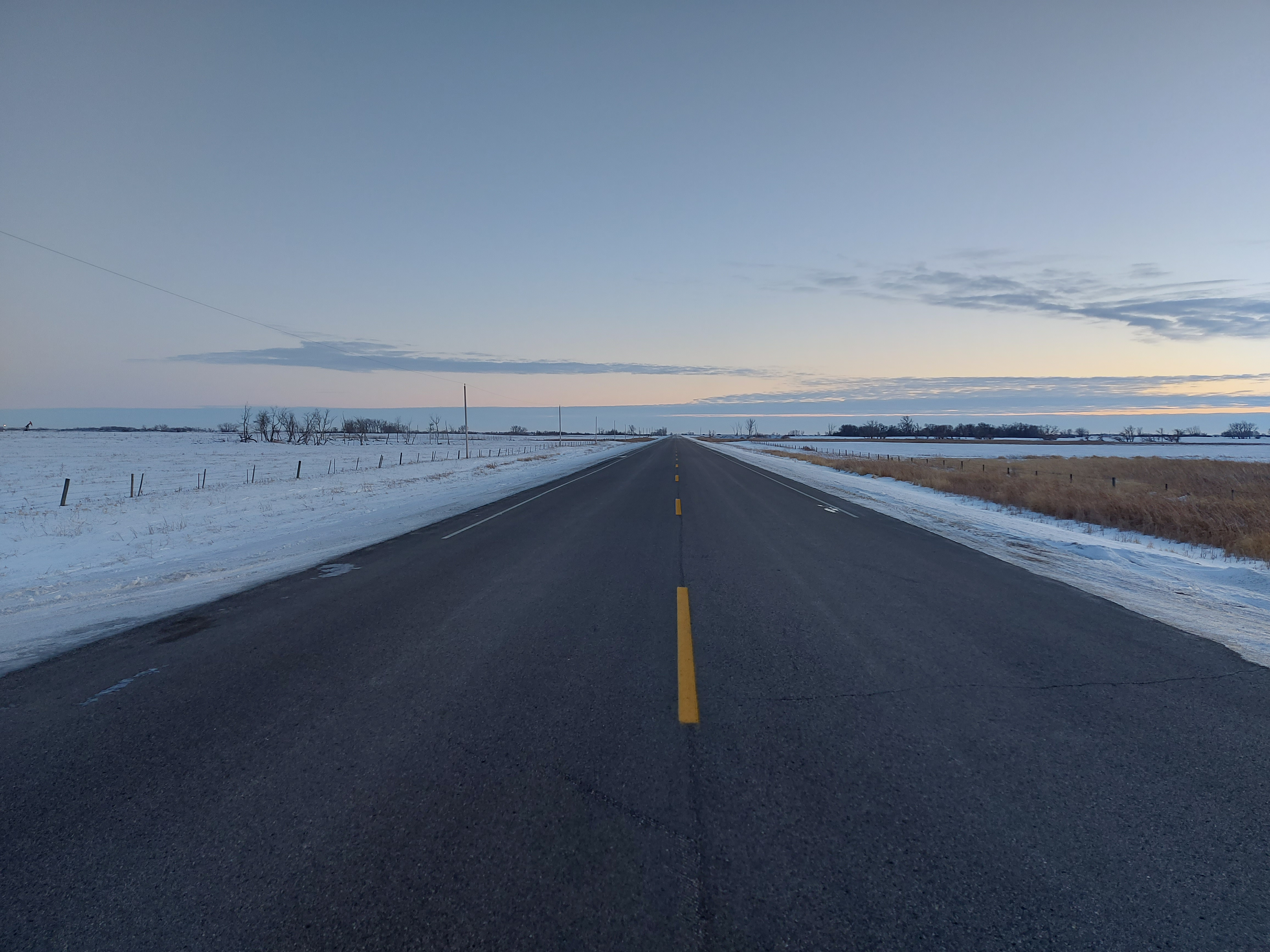
- Highway 8 north of Carievale

Route information
- Maintained by Ministry of Highways and Infrastructure
- Length: 410.0 km (254.8 mi)

Major junctions
- South end: ND 28 at the U.S. border near Elmore
- Highway 18 at Carievale; Highway 13 at Redvers; Highway 48 at Fairlight; Highway 1 (TCH) at Moosomin; Highway 16 (TCH/YH) at Langenburg; Highway 10 at Wroxton; Highway 5 at Kamsack; Highway 49 at Pelly and Norquay
- North end: Highway 982 at the Porcupine Provincial Forest

Location
- Country: Canada
- Province: Saskatchewan
- Rural municipalities: Mount Pleasant No. 2, Argyle No. 1, Storthoaks No. 31, Reciprocity No. 32, Antler No. 61, Maryfield No. 91, Moosomin No. 121, Rocanville No. 151, Spy Hill No. 152, Langenburg No. 181, Churchbridge No. 211, Calder No. 241, Cote No. 271, St. Philips No. 301, Keys No. 303, Clayton No. 333, Hudson Bay No. 394

Highway system
- Provincial highways in Saskatchewan
← Highway 7	→ Highway 9

Highway 8 is a provincial highway in Saskatchewan, Canada. The highway runs along the eastern side of the province from North Dakota Highway 28 at the U.S. border near Elmore until it transitions into Highway 982 just south of the Porcupine Hills. Along the route, it intersects both the Trans-Canada and Yellowhead Highways. It provides access to several towns and multiple smaller communities and is about 410 kilometres (250 mi) long. For most of the highway's route, it traverses relatively flat prairie. Along the way, though, it crosses three large river valleys, the Qu'Appelle River, Assiniboine River, and the Swan River.

Highway 8 is paved from Elmore (km 0) until Langenburg (km 215), and then from MacNutt (km 248) until km 396 near Swan Plain. In 2024, the section of Highway 8 from Rocanville south to Moosomin was named the worst road in Saskatchewan.

== Route description ==
Highway 8 is a north–south highway that closely follows Saskatchewan's eastern border with Manitoba. It begins near Elmore at the Canada–United States border crossing of Sherwood–Carievale in the south-east corner of Saskatchewan. South from the border, it continues as North Dakota Highway 28. North, it roughly parallels Saskatchewan's border with Manitoba until the Porcupine Hills.

From the border crossing and Elmore, Highway 8 heads north for about 19.3 kilometres (12.0 mi) to the village of Carievale. About 6.5 kilometres (4.0 mi) south of Carievale, the highway crosses the Antler River. Once at Carievale, the highway runs along the western side of the village before crossing a railway line and intersecting the east–west Highway 18. Highways 18 and 8 share a short westbound concurrency before 8 turns back north. Continuing north, Highway 8 intersects Highway 361 (eastbound on 361 accesses Storthoaks), passes through the former site of Saint Antoine, and enters the town of Redvers running along its eastern side. At Redvers, it has an intersection with the east–west Highway 13. Crossing 13, the highway continues north towards Highway 48. Along the way, it passes through Ryerson, provides access to Fairlight, and crosses a railway line. Fairlight is at the intersection of 8 and 48. After crossing 48, Highway 8 continues north where it crosses the Pipestone Creek, passes by Pipestone Hills Golf Course, and intersects Highway 709. Moosomin Lake Regional Park is a short distance west of Highway 8 with access from Highway 709. About 3.2 kilometres (2.0 mi) north of the 709, Highway 8 curves to the north-east and runs through the town of Moosomin as Main Street. On the north side of town, the highway crosses the CPR Mainline and meets Highway 1 — the Trans-Canada Highway. The two highways share a 1.6-kilometre (1 mi) long westbound concurrency. Highway 8 leaves the concurrency resuming its northbound routing.

Highway 8 continues north for roughly 25 kilometres (16 mi) to the town of Rocanville. En route to Rocanille, it intersects Highways 308 and 703. At Rocanville, the highway turns west running along the southern limits of town. It begins to curve back north as it rounds the west side of Rocanville. There it has an intersection with Highway 601 then heads north for 12 kilometres (7 mi) to the precipice of the Qu'Appelle Valley. It enters the valley travelling in a north-westerly direction. In the valley, it crosses the Qu'Appelle River and then climbs out the other side. Coming out of the valley, the highway heads north for 7.3 kilometres (4.5 mi) before turning north-east crossing Cutarm Creek. After Cutarm Creek, it provides access to Spy Hill then turns north heading to Langenburg and Highway 16 — the Yellowhead Highway. Between Spy Hill and Langenberg, Highway 8 provides access to Carlton Trail Regional Park and Langenburg Recreation Site. It also has a 1.6-kilometre (1 mi) long concurrency with Highway 22.

Highway 8 heads north from Langenburg for 12 kilometres (7.5 mi) at which point, it turns east at an intersection with Highway 723. Highway 723 continues west while 8 heads east for 6 kilometres (3.7 mi). It then turns north and runs for 30 kilometres (19 mi) to Highway 10. Along the way, it intersects Highway 381 at MacNutt. For roughly 30 kilometres (19 mi) between Langenburg and MacNutt, the highway has a gravel surface. At Highway 10, Highway 8 turns west and the two highways run concurrently for 19.7 kilometres (12.2 mi). The concurrency ends south of Wroxton at which point 8 turns north into Wroxton while 10 continues west to Yorkton. Travelling north from Wroxton, Highway 8 intersects Highways 726 and 357 en route to the town of Kamsack and Highway 5. Just prior to Kamsack, Highway 8 drops into the Assiniboine River Valley where it crosses the Assiniboine River near its confluence with the Whitesand River. It climbs out of the valley and turns north-west running along the south-western side of Kamsack. At Kamsack's western end, 8 meets the east–west Highway 5. Highway 5 runs through town as Queen Elizbeth Boulevard while Highway 8 continues north paralleling the Assiniboine River towards Pelly and Highway 49. Along this stretch of highway, 8 intersects Highway 660 and provides access to Badgerville on the Cote 64 Indian reserve and Saint Phillips and Springside on the Keeseekoose 66 Indian reserve. At Pelly, Highway 8 turns west and shares a 12.6-kilometre (7.8 mi) long concurrency with 49 that crosses the Assiniboine River and ends at Norquay. On the west side of Norquay, Highway 8 turns north once again. After about 10.7 kilometres (6.6 mi) of northward travel, 8 turns to the north-east and crosses the Swan River. After crossing the river, it heads north to Arabella, Highway 753, Okanese 82S Indian reserve, and Swan Plain. From Swan Plain, Highway 8 continues for a further 14.5 kilometres (9.0 mi) into the Porcupine Hills and Porcupine Provincial Forest before transitioning into Highway 982. Highway 982 continues north-west into the hills where it connects with Highway 9.

== Upgrades history ==
- Paving of Highway 8 from Highway 10 to 22.6 km (14.0 mi) northward was announced in June of 1998 to begin in July of that year.
- In mid-2001, a surfacing project was begun on 17.7 km (11.0 mi) of Highway 8 from Highway 357 until Kamsack.
- In 2001, 9.5 km (5.9 mi) of Highway 8 near Moosomin was resurfaced.
- In August 2004, improvement construction began on 11.2 km (7.0 mi) of Highway 8 from Storthoaks until 11 km (6.8 mi) south of Redvers.
- In August 2021, $13 million worth of resurfacing work was completed near Rocanville on Highways 8 and 308.
- In 2025, 24.07 km (14.96 mi) of Highway 8 was resurfaced between Moosomin and Rocanville at a cost of $12.7 million. In 2024, this section of Highway 8 was "named the worst highway in Saskatchewan because of the potholes".

== Major attractions ==
- The Moosomin Lake Regional Park is at km 121.
- The Carlton Trail Regional Park is at km 198.
- The Langenburg Recreation Site is at km 216.

== Major intersections ==
Rural municipality	Location	km	mi	Destinations	Notes
Mount Pleasant No. 2 – Argyle No. 1 line		0.0	0.0	ND 28 south – Mohall	Continuation into North Dakota
Mount Pleasant No. 2 – Argyle No. 1 line		0.0	0.0	Canada–United States border at Sherwood–Carievale Border Crossing	
Mount Pleasant No. 2 – Argyle No. 1 line	Carievale	19.9	12.4	Highway 18 east – Gainsborough	South end of Hwy 18 concurrency
Mount Pleasant No. 2		20.6	12.8	Highway 18 west – Estevan	North end of Hwy 18 concurrency
Storthoaks No. 31		43.6	27.1	Highway 361 – Alida, Storthoaks	
Antler No. 61	Redvers	66.2	41.1	Highway 13 (Red Coat Trail) – Weyburn, Carlyle, Manitoba border	
Maryfield No. 91	Fairlight	100.2	62.3	Highway 48 – Wawota, Maryfield	
Moosomin No. 121		126.7	78.7	Highway 709 west – Langbank	South end of Hwy 709 concurrency
Moosomin No. 121	Moosomin	131.8	81.9	Highway 709 east Highway 1 (TCH) east – Brandon, Winnipeg	South end of Hwy 1 concurrency; north end of Hwy 709 concurrency
Moosomin No. 121	Moosomin	133.3	82.8	Highway 1 (TCH) west – Regina	North end of Hwy 1 concurrency
Rocanville No. 151		152.6	94.8	Highway 308 east – Welwyn	
Rocanville No. 151	Rocanville	158.0	98.2	To Highway 600 – Fort Espérance National Historic Site	
Rocanville No. 151	Rocanville	160.1	99.5	Highway 719 west – Whitewood	
Spy Hill No. 152		178.4	110.9	Tantallon access road	
Spy Hill No. 152	Spy Hill	189.2	117.6	Highway 600 south	
Spy Hill No. 152		192.7	119.7	Highway 22 east – Binscarth	South end of Hwy 22 concurrency
Spy Hill No. 152		194.4	120.8	Highway 22 west – Esterhazy	North end of Hwy 22 concurrency
Langenburg No. 181	Langenburg	215.2	133.7	Highway 16 (TCH/YH) – Yorkton, Saskatoon, Russell, Winnipeg	South end of gravel section
Churchbridge No. 211		227.2	141.2	Highway 723 west – Bredenbury	
Churchbridge No. 211	MacNutt	248.0	154.1	Highway 381 – Hwy 80, Roblin	North end of gravel section
Calder No. 241		263.2	163.5	Highway 10 east – Roblin, Dauphin	South end of Hwy 10 concurrency
Calder No. 241		273.1	169.7	Calder access road	
Calder No. 241	Wroxton	282.9	175.8	Highway 10 west – Yorkton, Regina Highway 80 south – Churchbridge	North end of Hwy 10 concurrency
Calder No. 241		299.5	186.1	Highway 726 west – Rhein	
Cote No. 271		304.4	189.1	Highway 357 east – Togo	
Cote No. 271	Kamsack	323.4	201.0	Highway 5 – Canora, Saskatoon, Duck Mountain Provincial Park	
St. Philips No. 301	St. Philips	339.3	210.8	Highway 660 east – Arran	
St. Philips No. 301	Pelly	356.0	221.2	Highway 49 east – Swan River Highway 661 north	South end of Hwy 49 concurrency
Keys No. 303	Norquay	366.8	227.9	Highway 637 south – Veregin	
↑ / ↓	Norquay	368.6	229.0	Highway 49 west – Preeceville	North end of Hwy 49 concurrency
Clayton No. 333		389.0	241.7	Highway 753 – Danbury	
Clayton No. 333	Swan Plain	395.5	245.8		North end of paved section
Hudson Bay No. 394	Porcupine Provincial Forest	410.0	254.8	Highway 982 north – Hudson Bay	Hwy 8 northern terminus; continues as Hwy 982
1.000 mi = 1.609 km; 1.000 km = 0.621 mi: Concurrency terminus; Route transition

== See also ==
- Roads in Saskatchewan
- Transportation in Saskatchewan
