= Moosomin =

Moosomin is a word borrowed from the Cree language meaning low-bush cranberry or squash berry (Viburnum edule).

== People ==
- Chief Moosomin – a famous leader of the Cree in the 19th century

== Electoral districts ==
- Moosomin (N.W.T. electoral district) – a territorial electoral district in the Northwest Territories from 1885 to 1905
- Moosomin (provincial electoral district) – a current provincial electoral district in Saskatchewan

== Places ==
- Rural Municipality of Moosomin No. 121, Saskatchewan
  - Moosomin, Saskatchewan – a town in Saskatchewan named after Chief Moosomin
- Moosomin/Marshall McLeod Field Aerodrome – a municipal airport serving Moosomin Saskatchewan
- Moosomin Lake
