= Sherwood–Carievale Border Crossing =

Border crossing between Canada and the United States

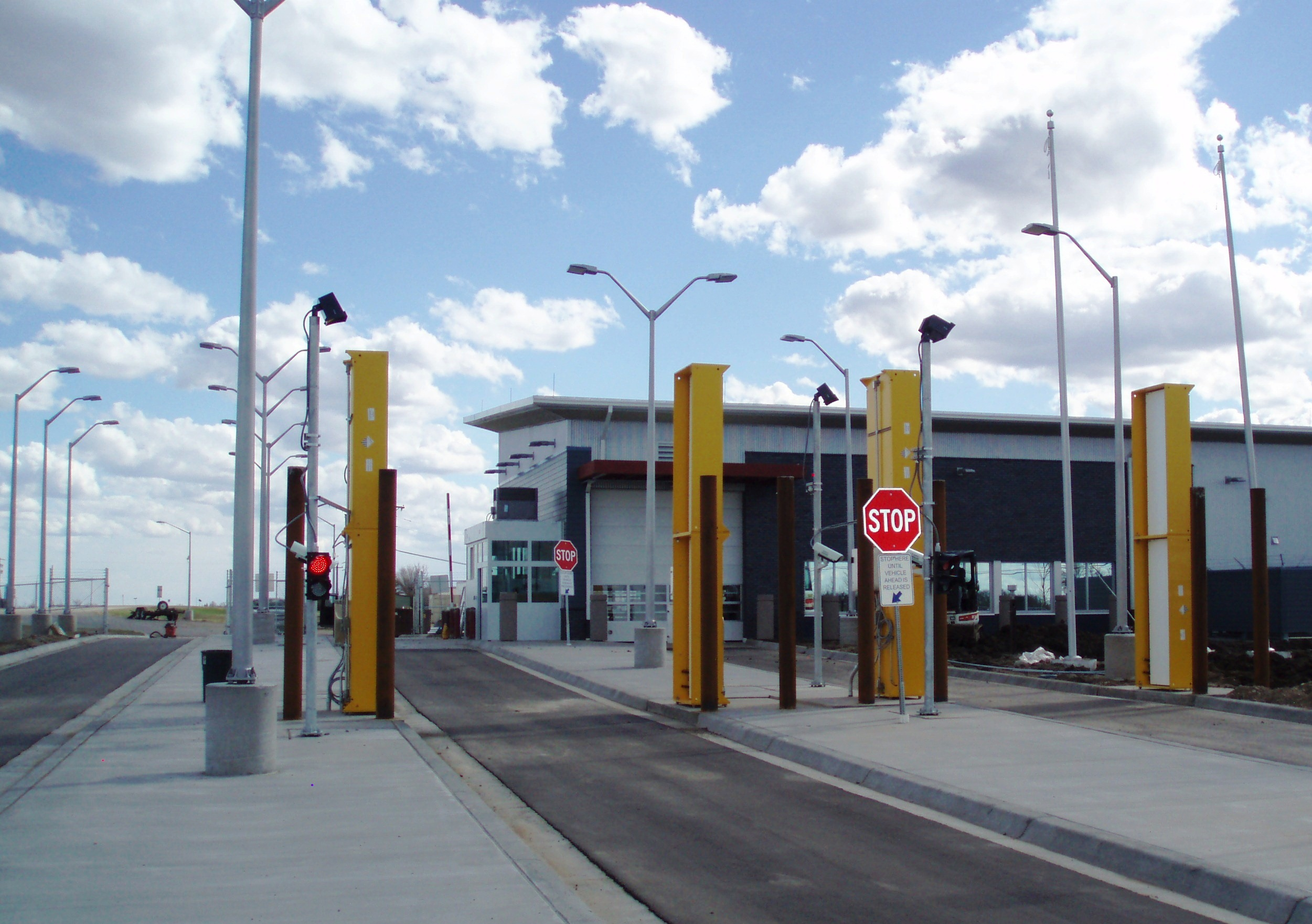
- US Border Inspection Station at Sherwood, North Dakota during its 2011 reconstruction

Locaiton
- Country: United States; Canada
- Location: ND 28 / Highway 8; US Port: 10927 HWY 28, Sherwood, ND 58782-9705; Canadian Port: Highway 8, Carievale SK S0C 0P0
- Coordinates: 48.999312°N 101.627871°W

Details
- Opened: 1930

Website
- www.cbp.gov/contact/ports/sherwood

The Sherwood–Carievale Border Crossing connects the towns of Sherwood, North Dakota and Carievale, Saskatchewan on the Canada–United States border. It is reached by North Dakota Highway 28 on the American side and Saskatchewan Highway 8 on the Canadian side. This is the easternmost border crossing in Saskatchewan; the Saskatchewan-Manitoba-North Dakota tripoint is located 19 kilometres (12 mi) east of this border crossing.

== History ==
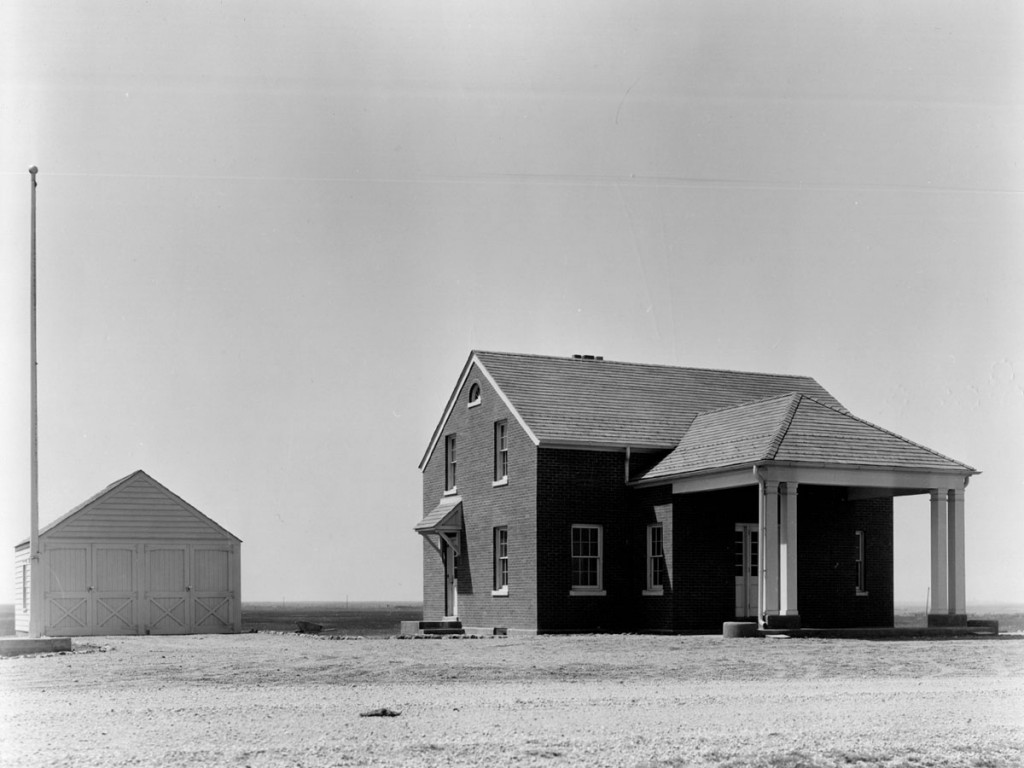
Sherwood border inspection station shortly after its construction in 1937

Border inspection services were first conducted at this crossing in 1930. The US first built a permanent inspection station at the border in 1937. That brick veneer roadside border station was replaced by a wooden structure in 1981, and that facility was replaced by a large modern border station using Recovery Act funds in 2011. Canada last replaced its border station in 1973.

== See also ==
- List of Canada–United States border crossings
