= Swan Plain =

Hamlet in Saskatchewan, Canada

Coordinates: 52°06′56″N 102°03′16″W

Swan Plain is a hamlet in the Canadian province of Saskatchewan. It is just south of the Porcupine Hills along Highway 8.

== Demographics ==
In the 2021 Census of Population conducted by Statistics Canada, Swan Plain had a population of 5 living in 6 of its 12 total private dwellings, a change of -66.7% from its 2016 population of 15. With a land area of 0.2 km^{2} (0.077 sq mi), it had a population density of 25.0/km^{2} (64.7/sq mi) in 2021.

== See also ==
- List of communities in Saskatchewan
