= Spy Hill Power Plant =

- Country: Canada
- Location: Spy Hill, Saskatchewan
- Coordinates: 50°35′56″N 101°50′52″W
- Status: Operational
- Commission date: 2011
- Owner: Northland Power

Thermal power station
- Primary fuel: Natural gas

Power generation
- Nameplate capacity: 86 MW

Spy Hill Power Plant is a natural gas-fired station owned by Northland Power, in Spy Hill, Saskatchewan, Canada. The plant operates as a power peaking plant, complete with synchronous condense (voltage control), under a 25-year power purchase agreement with SaskPower. Construction started on the project in 2009, and was completed in October 2011. The plant was built using two General Electric LM 6000 gas turbines. Construction of the plant was expected to cost $145 million.

== Description ==
The Power Station consists of two turbines (supplied by General Electric LM6000), that operate in a simple cycle configuration.
