= Moosomin Lake =

Lake in Saskatchewan, Canada

- Moosomin Reservoir
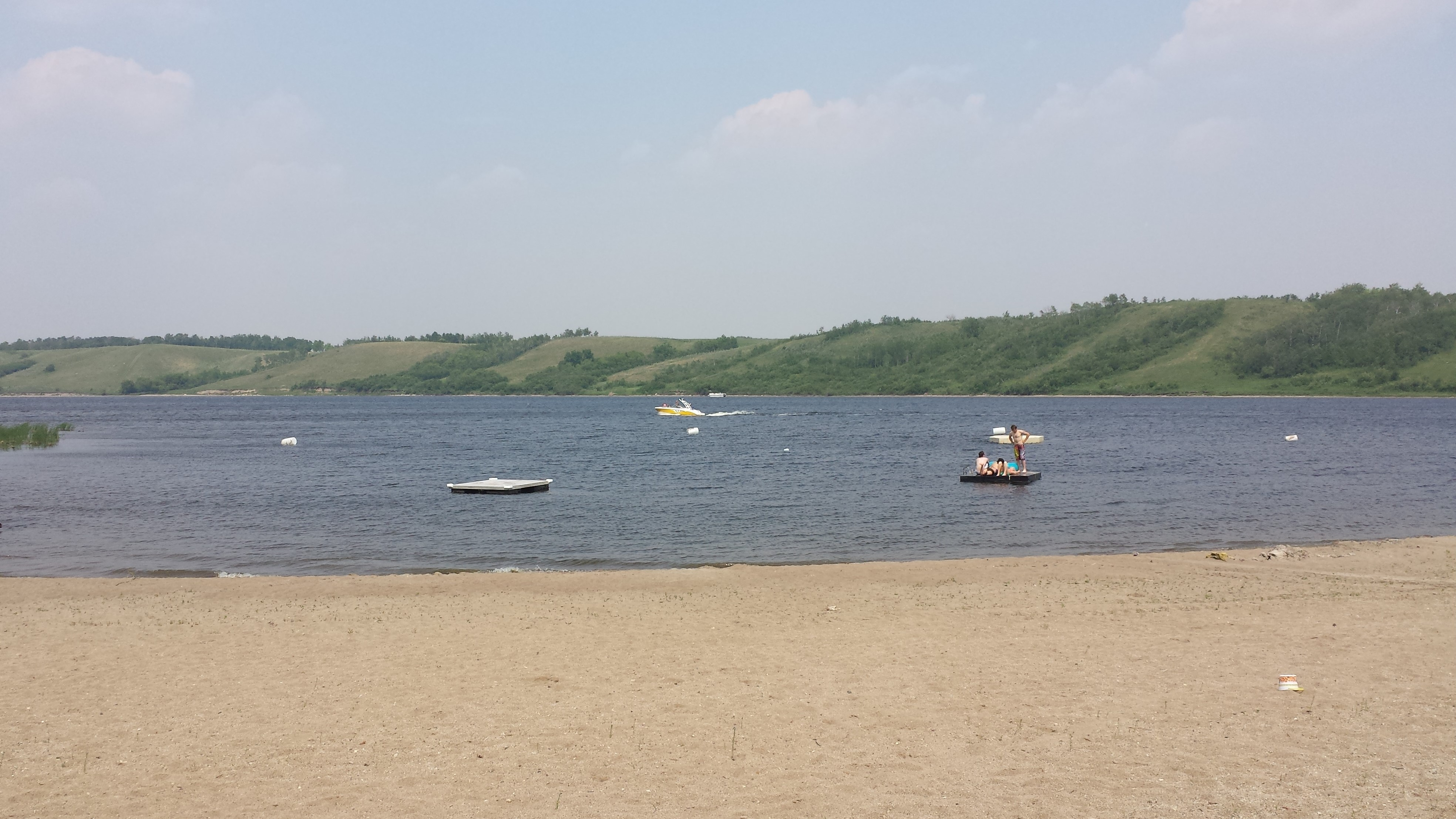
- Moosomin Lake Regional Park

- Location in Saskatchewan Moosomin Lake (Canada)
- Location: Southeast Saskatchewan
- Coordinates: 50°04′00″N 101°42′02″W
- Lake type: Reservoir
- Part of: Red River drainage basin
- Primary inflows: Pipestone Creek
- Primary outflows: Pipestone Creek
- Basin countries: Canada
- Managing agency: Saskatchewan Water Security Agency
- First flooded: 1954
- Max. length: 8 km (5.0 mi)
- Surface area: 389 ha (960 acres)
- Max. depth: 8.4 m (28 ft)
- Water volume: 11,156 dam^{3} (9,044 acre⋅ft)
- Shore length^{1}: 30.1 km (18.7 mi)
- Surface elevation: 544 m (1,785 ft)
- Settlements: None
- ^{1} Shore length is not a well-defined measure.

Moosomin Lake, also known as Moosomin Reservoir, is a man-made lake in south-eastern part of the Canadian province of Saskatchewan. Created by the damming of Pipestone Creek in 1954, Moosomin Lake is located about 10 kilometres (6.2 mi) south of the town of Moosomin and is in the Souris River watershed. The reservoir's uses include irrigation, water supply, and recreation. Moosomin Lake Regional Park is on lake's western shore.

The town of Moosomin gets its drinking water from wells alongside the lake. From the wells, the water is piped to town. In 2022, $10 million in funding was approved to upgrade the water treatment plant.

In 2011, much of the Souris River watershed flooded in a greater-than-one-in-a-hundred year flood event. While the well shacks are a few feet higher than the normal water level in Moosomin Lake, due to the rising water levels, sandbags had to be used around the wells to protect them from being contaminated. After the waters receded, permanent three-foot clay dykes were built at the well site to protect the wells from future potential flooding.

== Geology ==
Moosomin Lake sits in the Pipestone Valley, which was created about 15,000 years ago with the melting of the last ice age. The valley was cut by the melting waters from glacial Lake Indian Head and is called the Pipestone Spillway.

== Moosomin Dam ==
The construction of Moosomin Dam (50.0478°N 101.6905°W) along the Pipestone Creek began in 1953 and work was completed by November 1954. It is an earth-filled embankment dam located at the south-east corner of Moosomin Lake that is 13.5 metres (44 ft) high with an uncontrolled overflow concrete spillway and a gated riparian outlet. The maximum discharge capacity is 448 m^{3} (15,800 cu ft) per second. The total length of the reservoir when full is 8 kilometres (5.0 mi) long with a total storage capacity of 11,156 dam^{3} (394,000,000 cu ft). The surface area for the reservoir is 389 hectares (960 acres).

A $9.7 million rehabilitation project on the dam was begun in 2023. The project involved adding a 300 mm (12 in) thick concrete slab to the top of the existing spillway, upgrades to the embankment road, improvement to the drainage system, erosion prevention work, and improvement to the movement monitoring system. Work was completed by the summer of 2024.

== Moosomin Lake Regional Park ==
Moosomin Lake Regional Park (50.0784°N 101.7106°W) opened up in 1955 along the western shore of the lake. The regional park is about 14 kilometres (8.7 mi) from the town of Moosomin and can be accessed from Highway 709, which is just off Highway 8. The park features camping, swimming, and boating. There are 125 serviced campsites plus unserviced over-flow sites. The beach area of the park has a sandy beach, a picnic area, and a playground. There are also boat launches and a marina that was built in 2015. Just outside the park, to the east near the dam and along Highway 8, is the 9-hole Pipestone Hills Golf Course.

== Fish species ==
Fish species commonly found in Moosomin Lake include walleye, northern pike, white sucker, and yellow perch. It is stocked regularly with walleye fry.

== See also ==
- Saskatchewan Water Security Agency
- List of dams and reservoirs in Canada
- List of lakes of Saskatchewan
- List of protected areas of Saskatchewan
