= Spy Hill =

Village in Saskatchewan, Canada

Coordinates: 50°37′07″N 101°41′14″W

Location of Spy Hill in Saskatchewan

Spy Hill (2016 population: 168) is a village in the Canadian province of Saskatchewan within the Rural Municipality of Spy Hill No. 152 and Census Division No. 5. It is at the intersection of Highway 8 and Highway 600. The community's school closed due to a lack of students, who are now bused approximately 27 kilometres (17 mi) to Langenburg). The Northland Power – Spy Hill Power Plant is located in the community.

== History ==
Spy Hill incorporated as a village on April 22, 1910.

== Demographics ==
Population history (1981–2016)
Year	Pop.	±%
1981	354	—
1986	352	−0.6%
1991	297	−15.6%
1996	264	−11.1%
2001	213	−19.3%
2006	201	−5.6%
2011	204	+1.5%
2016	168	−17.6%
2021	173	+3.0%
Source: Statistics Canada via Saskatchewan Bureau of Statistics

In the 2021 Census of Population conducted by Statistics Canada, Spy Hill had a population of 173 living in 90 of its 116 total private dwellings, a change of 3% from its 2016 population of 168. With a land area of 1.15 km^{2} (0.44 sq mi), it had a population density of 150.4/km^{2} (389.6/sq mi) in 2021.

In the 2016 Census of Population, the Village of Spy Hill recorded a population of 168 living in 87 of its 116 total private dwellings, a -21.4% change from its 2011 population of 204. With a land area of 1.19 km^{2} (0.46 sq mi), it had a population density of 141.2/km^{2} (365.6/sq mi) in 2016.

== Notable people ==
- Jeff Odgers, former NHL player

== See also ==
- List of francophone communities in Saskatchewan
