= Calder, Saskatchewan =

Village in Saskatchewan, Canada

Calder
- Village
- Village of Calder
- Flag

- Location of Calder in Saskatchewan Calder (Canada)
- Coordinates: 51.09°N 101.45°W
- Country: Canada
- Province: Saskatchewan
- Region: East-central
- Census division: 9
- Rural Municipality: Calder
- Settled: 1888
- Incorporated (Village): January 18, 1911

Government
  - Type: Municipal
  - Governing body: Calder Village Council
  - Mayor: Ivan Sobkow
  - Councillors: Kaili Strand, Vaughan Shipp
  - Administrator: Rita Brock

Area
  - Total: 0.75 km^{2} (0.29 sq mi)

Population (2016)
  - Total: 90
  - Density: 120.6/km^{2} (312/sq mi)
- Time zone: UTC-6 (CST)
- Postal code: S0A 0K0
- Area code: 306
- Highways: Highway 8 Highway 10
- Railways: Defunct, pulled

Calder (2016 population: 90) is a village in the Canadian province of Saskatchewan within the Rural Municipality of Calder No. 241 and Census Division No. 9. The village lies approximately 56 km east of the city of Yorkton and 35 km west of Roblin, Manitoba, approximately 5 km south of Highway 8 and Highway 10.

== History ==
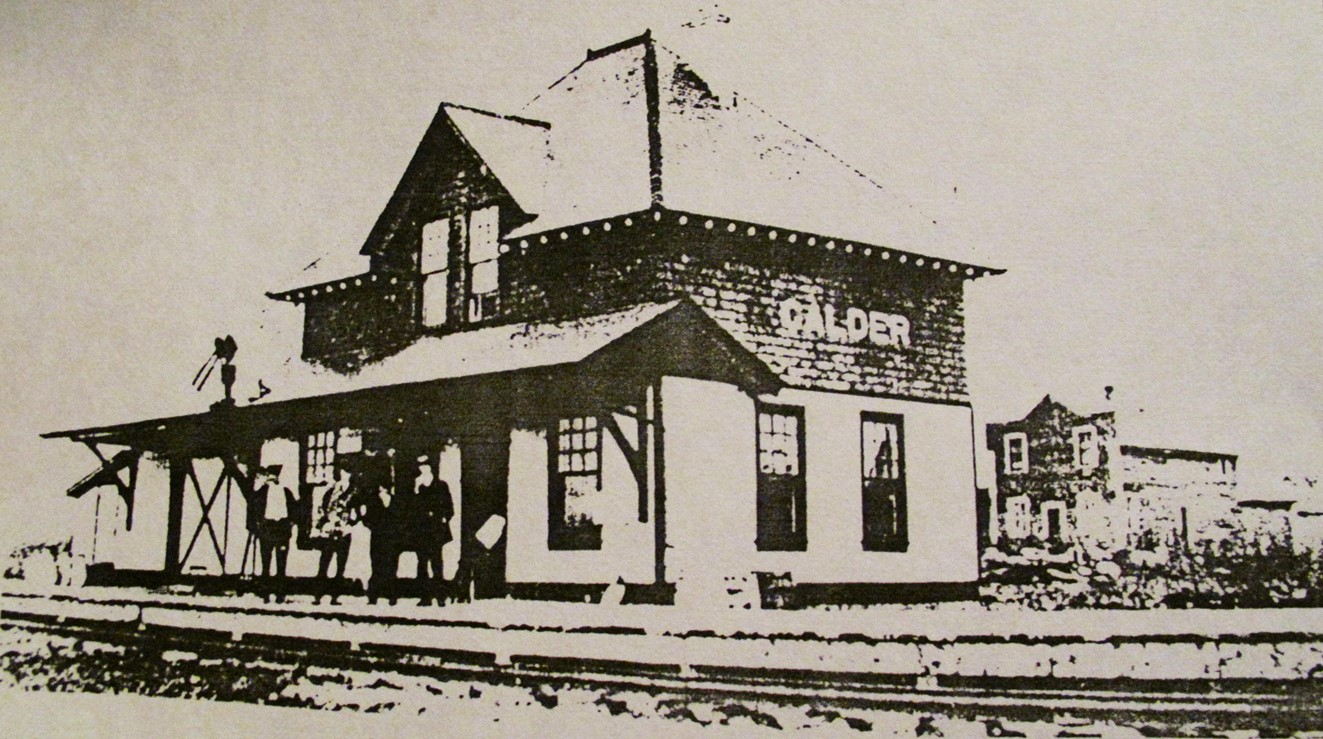
Calder Station in 1916

The history of Calder goes back to 1888, when a number of Icelanders and others settled just to the south of the present village, calling it the "Lögberg" district or "Lögberg of the Northwest Territories". By the year 1897, the Icelanders and their other neighbours were quite comfortably settled when a group of Ruthenians from the Austrian provinces of Bukovina and Galicia arrived by rail between 1897 and 1898 at Saltcoats. Government agents escorted the new settlers to quarter sections of land where they homesteaded within a five to 10 mile radius of the present site of Calder. Additional Romanian immigrants from Bucovina continued to homestead remaining sections south of Calder between 1899 and 1905.

In the fall of 1910, the Canadian Northern Railway came through and called the site "Third Siding West of Shellmouth". The rail reached the homestead of Mike Rohatensky before halting construction for the winter months. A railway loop was built in Calder where the train turned and journeyed back to Russell.

A petition to incorporate as a village was signed by 13 local business leaders in October 1910. Calder incorporated as a village on January 18, 1911. It was named after MLA James Alexander Calder. The first elections to form a village council were held on January 6, 1911.

In 1929, the Calder Electric Company brought electric power to the village and several street lamps were erected.

== Demographics ==
Population history (1981–2016)
Year	Pop.	±%
1981	164	—
1986	160	−2.4%
1991	155	−3.1%
1996	106	−31.6%
2001	109	+2.8%
2006	80	−26.6%
2011	97	+21.2%
2016	90	−7.2%
Source: Statistics Canada via Saskatchewan Bureau of Statistics

In the 2021 Census of Population conducted by Statistics Canada, Calder had a population of 81 living in 44 of its 62 total private dwellings, a change of −10% from its 2016 population of 90. With a land area of 0.75 km^{2} (0.29 sq mi), it had a population density of 108.0/km^{2} (279.7/sq mi) in 2021.

In the 2016 Census of Population, the Village of Calder recorded a population of 90 living in 54 of its 67 total private dwellings, a −7.8% change from its 2011 population of 97. With a land area of 0.75 km^{2} (0.29 sq mi), it had a population density of 120.0/km^{2} (310.8/sq mi) in 2016.

== Education ==
In 1891, Rothbury School was built followed by Minerva School in 1895. These schools to the south of the Icelandic settlement were too great a distance for the Ukrainians to attend. Thus, they applied for schools closer by. The first one to be built in the immediate five-mile radius was Chernawka School, erected in 1906, 1½ miles east of the village site. It was named after a village in Bucovina. Mostetz School was built in 1907, named after homesteader Henry Mostoway and Torsk School was erected about the same time.

It wasn't until after the railway came through and the village of Calder was incorporated in 1911, that Calder School District #515 was established. A lean-to was built onto a poolroom on Main Street and in this makeshift schoolroom was where first classes were held with Miss Fannie Brown as teacher. In 1912 a two-story school was erected. In 1914 the school was closed due to a small pox epidemic and in 1917 the school was closed for three months due to the influenza epidemic. High school grades weren't offered until 1922. In 1929 a third room was added, which became the room for the high school grades.

By the year 1954, rural schools were facing closure and some of these students were then bussed into Calder. Thus, a new school was built in 1961 to accommodate the increasing attendance. Two of the buildings from the old school on Main Street were moved to the current Calder School premises to become classrooms. Also, at this time, Calder School became part of the Kamsack School Unit.

From 1961 to 1966, seven classrooms were in operation. In 1967, Grades 10, 11 and 12 transferred to the Yorkton Regional High School. It wasn't until the 1998 that the Grade 9 classes were transferred to school in Yorkton. Currently the school teaches grades K-8.

Calder celebrated the Province of Saskatchewan's Centennial July 30–31, 2005, where the village introduced the official flag, which the design had been part of the Calder School's students as a competition. Over 600 current and previous residents in attendance. In July 2011 the village held its 100th anniversary.

== See also ==
- List of communities in Saskatchewan
- List of villages in Saskatchewan
