= Rural Municipality of Spy Hill No. 152 =

Rural municipality in Saskatchewan, Canada

Spy Hill No. 152
- Rural municipality
- Rural Municipality of Spy Hill No. 152
- Location of the RM of Spy Hill No. 152 in Saskatchewan
- Coordinates: 50.517°N 101.764°W
- Country: Canada
- Province: Saskatchewan
- Census division: 5
- SARM division: 1
- Formed: December 11, 1911

Government
  - Reeve: Bob Bruce
  - Governing body: RM of Spy Hill No. 152 Council
  - Administrator: Carey Nicholauson
  - Office location: Spy Hill

Area (2016)
  - Land: 679.33 km^{2} (262.29 sq mi)

Population (2016)
  - Total: 323
  - Density: 0.5/km^{2} (1.3/sq mi)
- Time zone: CST
  - Summer (DST): CST
- Area codes: 306 and 639

The Rural Municipality of Spy Hill No. 152 (2016 population: 323) is a rural municipality (RM) in the Canadian province of Saskatchewan within Census Division No. 5 and SARM Division No. 1. It is located in the east-central portion of the province.

== History ==
The RM of Spy Hill No. 152 incorporated as a rural municipality on December 11, 1911. It was previously established as a local improvement district on January 3, 1910.

Heritage properties

There is one heritage building located within the RM.

- Voysey Farmhouse Site, constructed in 1917, is representative of an early farm settlement of the period

== Demographics ==
Population history (1981–2016)
Year	Pop.	±%
1981	611	—
1986	624	+2.1%
1991	553	−11.4%
1996	496	−10.3%
2001	409	−17.5%
2006	365	−10.8%
2011	366	+0.3%
2016	323	−11.7%
Source: Statistics Canada via Saskatchewan Bureau of Statistics

In the 2021 Census of Population conducted by Statistics Canada, the RM of Spy Hill No. 152 had a population of 383 living in 155 of its 191 total private dwellings, a change of 18.6% from its 2016 population of 323. With a land area of 646.54 km^{2} (249.63 sq mi), it had a population density of 0.6/km^{2} (1.5/sq mi) in 2021.

In the 2016 Census of Population, the RM of Spy Hill No. 152 recorded a population of 323 living in 126 of its 133 total private dwellings, a −11.7% change from its 2011 population of 366. With a land area of 679.33 km^{2} (262.29 sq mi), it had a population density of 0.5/km^{2} (1.2/sq mi) in 2016.

== Carlton Trail Regional Park ==
Carlton Trail Regional Park (50.6752°N 101.6949°W) is a regional park within the RM's boundaries that is located 7 kilometres (4.3 mi) north of Spy Hill and accessed from Highway 8. The origins of the park began in the 1950s when John From, a local land owner and professional landscaper, built a summer park for local residents. He dug two artificial lakes, built a golf course, and added a campground. In 1972, John From sold the park to the Regional Park Authority. Carlton Trail Regional Park is located along the Carlton Trail, which was a 19th century trail that linked Fort Garry with Fort Edmonton.

The park is a family recreation and activity centre that features a 9-hole golf course, 9-hole disk golf course, two campgrounds, a group campsite, two man-made lakes, ball diamonds, food services, and hiking trails. The campgrounds have a total of 129 campsites with fire pits, potable water, picnic tables, washrooms, and showers. Swimming Lake–the smaller of the lakes–has a large beach, picnic area, and playground. The other lake, From Lake, is a 12-acre lake that is stocked for anglers. Only electric boats and canoes are allowed on the lake.

The golf course is a grass greens, 9-hole course. There's a licensed club house, pro-shop, and restaurant. The white tees are 3,055 yards with a par of 36 and red tees are 2,935 yards with a par of 37.

== Government ==
The RM of Spy Hill No. 152 is governed by an elected municipal council and an appointed administrator that meets on the second Thursday of every month. The reeve of the RM is Bob Bruce while its administrator is Carey Nicholauson. The RM's office is located in Spy Hill.

== Geography ==
=== Communities ===
Villages

- Gerald
- Spy Hill
- Tantallon

Unincorporated communities

- Hazel Cliffe

Localities

- Welby

== See also ==
- List of rural municipalities in Saskatchewan
