= Northern village =

Northern village may refer to:

- Northern village (Quebec), a municipal status type in Quebec, Canada
- Northern village (Saskatchewan), a municipal status type in Saskatchewan, Canada
