= Carievale =

Village in Saskatchewan, Canada

- Village
- Village of Carievale
- Carievale, Saskatchewan

- Location of Carievale in Saskatchewan Carievale (Canada)
- Coordinates: 49.173333°N 101.625556°W
- Country: Canada
- Province: Saskatchewan
- Region: Southeast
- Census division: 1
- Rural municipality: Argyle No. 1
- Post office Founded: February 1, 1891
- Incorporated (Village): May 6, 1907

Government
  - Type: Municipal
  - Governing body: Carievale Village Council
  - Mayor: Greg Martin

Area
  - Land: 1.51 km^{2} (0.58 sq mi)

Population (2021)
  - Total: 244
- Time zone: UTC-6 (CST)
- Postal code: S0C 0P0
- Area code: 306
- Highways: Highway 8 Highway 18

Carievale (2021 population: 244) is a village in the Canadian province of Saskatchewan within the Rural Municipality of Argyle No. 1 and Census Division No. 1. The village lies at the intersection of Highway 8 and Highway 18.

== History ==
The community's post office was established on February 1, 1891. Carievale incorporated as a village on March 14, 1903.

== Demographics ==
Population history (1981–2016)
Year	Pop.	±%
1981	246	—
1986	219	−11.0%
1991	234	+6.8%
1996	253	+8.1%
2001	254	+0.4%
2006	241	−5.1%
2011	236	−2.1%
2016	240	+1.7%
2021	244	+1.7%
Source: Statistics Canada via Saskatchewan Bureau of Statistics

In the 2021 Census of Population conducted by Statistics Canada, Carievale had a population of 244 living in 103 of its 113 total private dwellings, a change of 1.7% from its 2016 population of 240. With a land area of 1.51 km^{2} (0.58 sq mi), it had a population density of 161.6/km^{2} (418.5/sq mi) in 2021.

In the 2016 Census of Population, the Village of Carievale recorded a population of 240 living in 105 of its 110 total private dwellings, a 1.7% change from its 2011 population of 236. With a land area of 0.88 km^{2} (0.34 sq mi), it had a population density of 272.7/km^{2} (706.4/sq mi) in 2016.

== See also ==
- List of communities in Saskatchewan
- List of villages in Saskatchewan
