= Gerald, Saskatchewan =

Village in Saskatchewan, Canada

Gerald
- Village
- Village of Gerald
- Location of Gerald in Saskatchewan Gerald (Canada)
- Coordinates: 50.664°N 101.793°W
- Country: Canada
- Province: Saskatchewan
- Region: Southeast
- Census division: 5
- Rural Municipality: Spy Hill No. 152
- Post office: 1909-2003

Government
  - Type: Municipal
  - Governing body: Gerald Village Council
  - Mayor: Brian Swann
  - Administrator: Susan Gawryluk
  - MP: Robert Kitchen
  - MLA: Dan D'Autremont

Area
  - Land: 0.74 km^{2} (0.29 sq mi)

Population (2021)
  - Total: 129
  - Density: 174.3/km^{2} (451/sq mi)
- Time zone: UTC-6 (CST)
- Postal code: S0A 1B0
- Area code: 306
- Highways: Highway 636
- Railways: Canadian National Railway

Gerald (2016 population: 136) is a village in the Canadian province of Saskatchewan within the Rural Municipality of Spy Hill No. 152 and Census Division No. 5.

== History ==
Gerald incorporated as a village on March 25, 1953.

== Demographics ==
Population history (1956–2021)
Year	Pop.	±%
1956	98	—
1961	131	+33.7%
1966	231	+76.3%
1971	174	−24.7%
1976	139	−20.1%
1981	197	+41.7%
1986	201	+2.0%
1991	186	−7.5%
1996	164	−11.8%
2001	159	−3.0%
2006	124	−22.0%
2011	114	−8.1%
2016	136	+19.3%
2021	129	−5.1%
Source: Statistics Canada via Saskatchewan Bureau of Statistics

In the 2021 Census of Population conducted by Statistics Canada, Gerald had a population of 129 living in 55 of its 68 total private dwellings, a change of −5.1% from its 2016 population of 136. With a land area of 0.74 km^{2} (0.29 sq mi), it had a population density of 174.3/km^{2} (451.5/sq mi) in 2021.

In the 2016 Census of Population, the Village of Gerald recorded a population of 136 living in 58 of its 65 total private dwellings, a 16.2% change from its 2011 population of 114. With a land area of 0.8 km^{2} (0.31 sq mi), it had a population density of 170.0/km^{2} (440.3/sq mi) in 2016.

== See also ==
- List of communities in Saskatchewan
- List of villages in Saskatchewan
