= Gainsborough, Saskatchewan =

Village in Saskatchewan, Canada

Gainsborough
- Village
- Village of Gainsborough
- Aerial view (2026)
- Motto: First incorporated village in Saskatchewan
- Location within Saskatchewan Location within Canada
- Coordinates: 49°10′34″N 101°27′30″W
- Country: Canada
- Province: Saskatchewan
- Region: Southeast
- Census division: 1
- Rural Municipality: Argyle No. 1
- Post office Founded: 1884-04-01
- Incorporated (Village): 1882 (1st. incorporated village in Saskatchewan)

Government
  - Type: Municipal
  - Governing body: Gainsborough Village Council
  - Mayor: Victor Huish
  - Administrator: Erin McMillen
  - MP: Robert Kitchen
  - MLA: Dan D'Autremont

Area
  - Total: 1.95 km^{2} (0.75 sq mi)

Population (2016)
  - Total: 286
- Time zone: UTC-6 (CST)
- Postal code: S0C 0Z0
- Area code: 306
- Highways: Highway 18
- Railways: Canadian Pacific Railway

Gainsborough (2016 population: 254) is a village in the Western Canadian province of Saskatchewan within the Rural Municipality of Argyle No. 1 and Census Division No. 1. A farming community, the village is located on Highway 18 in the southeastern corner of Saskatchewan. Gainsborough is approximately 6 kilometres (3.7 mi) from the Manitoba border, and 19 kilometres (12 mi) from the North Dakota, United States border. The first post office was established on April 1, 1884 as the community of 'Antler'. On September 1, 1885, the name of the community changed to Gainsborough, named after Gainsborough, Lincolnshire in England, which was the former home of J. J. Sadler, an early settler.

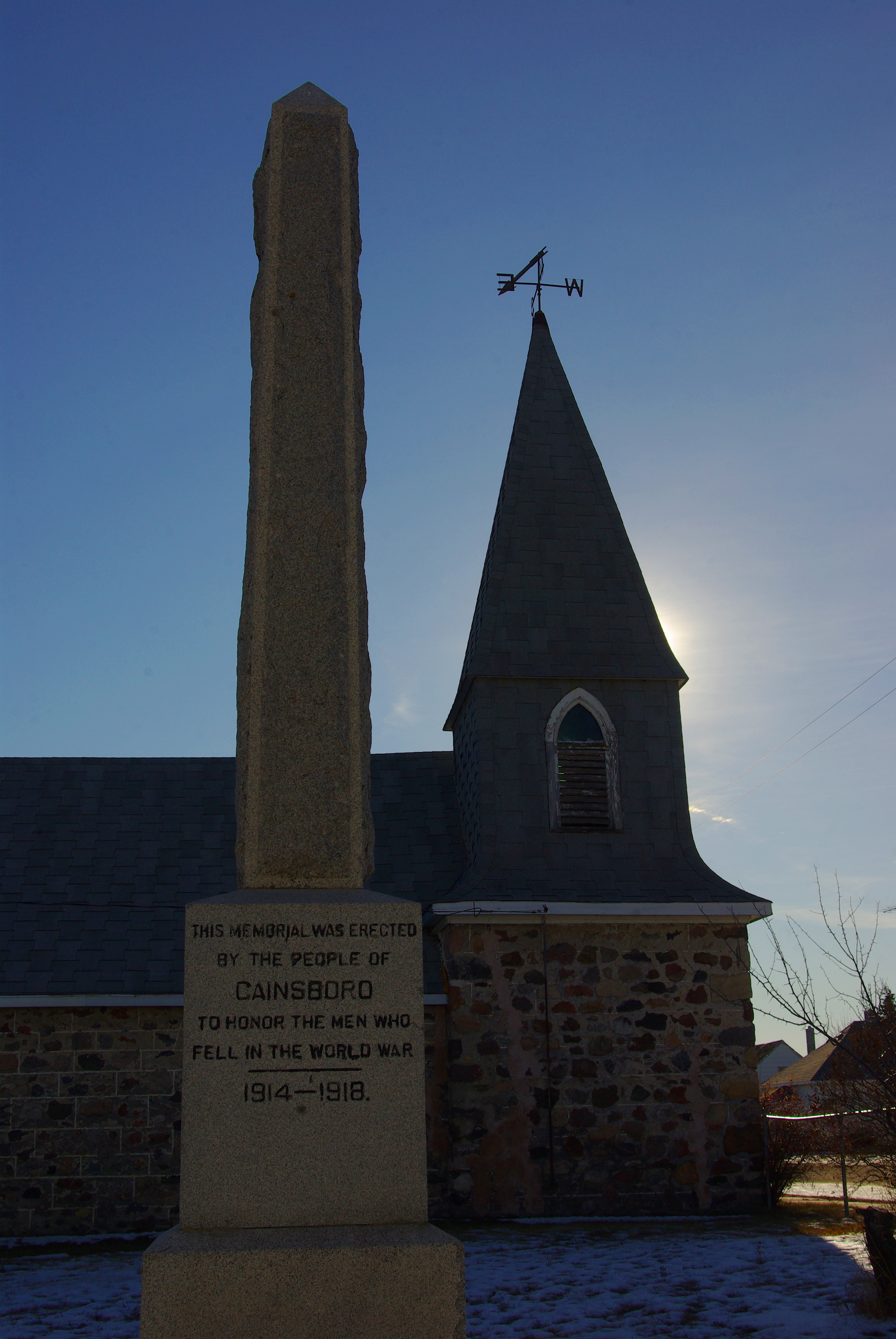
Town cenotaph with Anglican Christ Church in the background

== History ==
Gainsborough incorporated as a village on May 25, 1894.

The Gainsborough Creek forms most of the southern boundary of the town, while the rest of the community is bordered by open fields and pasture. A tributary of the Souris River, the creek is prone to flooding during the spring thaw. Though several nearby communities made national headlines as disaster areas during severe flooding in 2011, most buildings in Gainsborough did not require unusual extraordinary protection measures or sandbagging. In 2014, extended heavy rainfall in the region resulted in severe flash flooding that forced the complete evacuation of residents to neighbouring communities and made national headlines. Provincial premier Brad Wall did an aerial survey of the flood area that allowed images and video of the flooded village to be recorded near the maximum height of the waters.

== Demographics ==
Population history (1981–2016)
Year	Pop.	±%
1981	308	—
1986	325	+5.5%
1991	301	−7.4%
1996	296	−1.7%
2001	286	−3.4%
2006	250	−12.6%
2011	291	+16.4%
2016	254	−12.7%
Source: Statistics Canada via Saskatchewan Bureau of Statistics

In the 2021 Census of Population conducted by Statistics Canada, Gainsborough had a population of 227 living in 113 of its 144 total private dwellings, a change of −10.6% from its 2016 population of 254. With a land area of 0.94 km^{2} (0.36 sq mi), it had a population density of 241.5/km^{2} (625.5/sq mi) in 2021.

In the 2016 Census of Population, the Village of Gainsborough recorded a population of 254 living in 124 of its 144 total private dwellings, a −14.6% change from its 2011 population of 291. With a land area of 0.87 km^{2} (0.34 sq mi), it had a population density of 292.0/km^{2} (756.2/sq mi) in 2016.

== Economy ==
Saskatchewan is in the CST Zone, and since 1967 it has not observed daylight saving time meaning that local clocks do not get changed in summer. A practical effect on border towns like Gainsborough is that they only align with neighbouring communities in Manitoba and North Dakota for half the year, which may lead to misunderstandings regarding the timing of scheduled inter-community events.

Primary income of community members is derived from agricultural businesses (farming, ranching) and petroleum drilling services.

== Places of interest ==
- Bennet Park - located on Railway Avenue (main street), formerly the location of a pool hall, hardware store, and mechanic
- Bowens Park - central to the southern half of the town along Antler Avenue
- Memorial Cenotaph - located adjacent to the theatre on Bruce Street
- Churches - two (Knox United, Anglican). The Anglican Christ Church is registered on the List of historic places in Saskatchewan
- Community hall - basement with kitchen, main hall has a stage and upper meeting room
- Gainsborough Agricultural Grounds - kitchen facilities, three baseball diamonds, racetrack located north of the curling rink.
- Campground facilities are located north of the Health Centre adjacent to the sports fields.
- There is a privately owned museum with articles from the town's history that is opened by request.

== Amenities, associations, and clubs ==
- Lions Clubs International
- Gainsborough Library
- Gainsborough Curling Club
- There is a small grass airstrip located in the north end of the town listed as the Gainsborough Airport.

== Notable people ==
- Dr William G. Hobbs, a former physician in the Gainsborough Union Hospital (closed c. 1987), did a painting of the main street of the town entitled "40 Below Zero" that won a national contest in 1978. The buildings pictured in it are no longer standing and the location on Railway Avenue is now known as Bennett Park.
- Lew Morrison, former NHLer

== Gallery ==
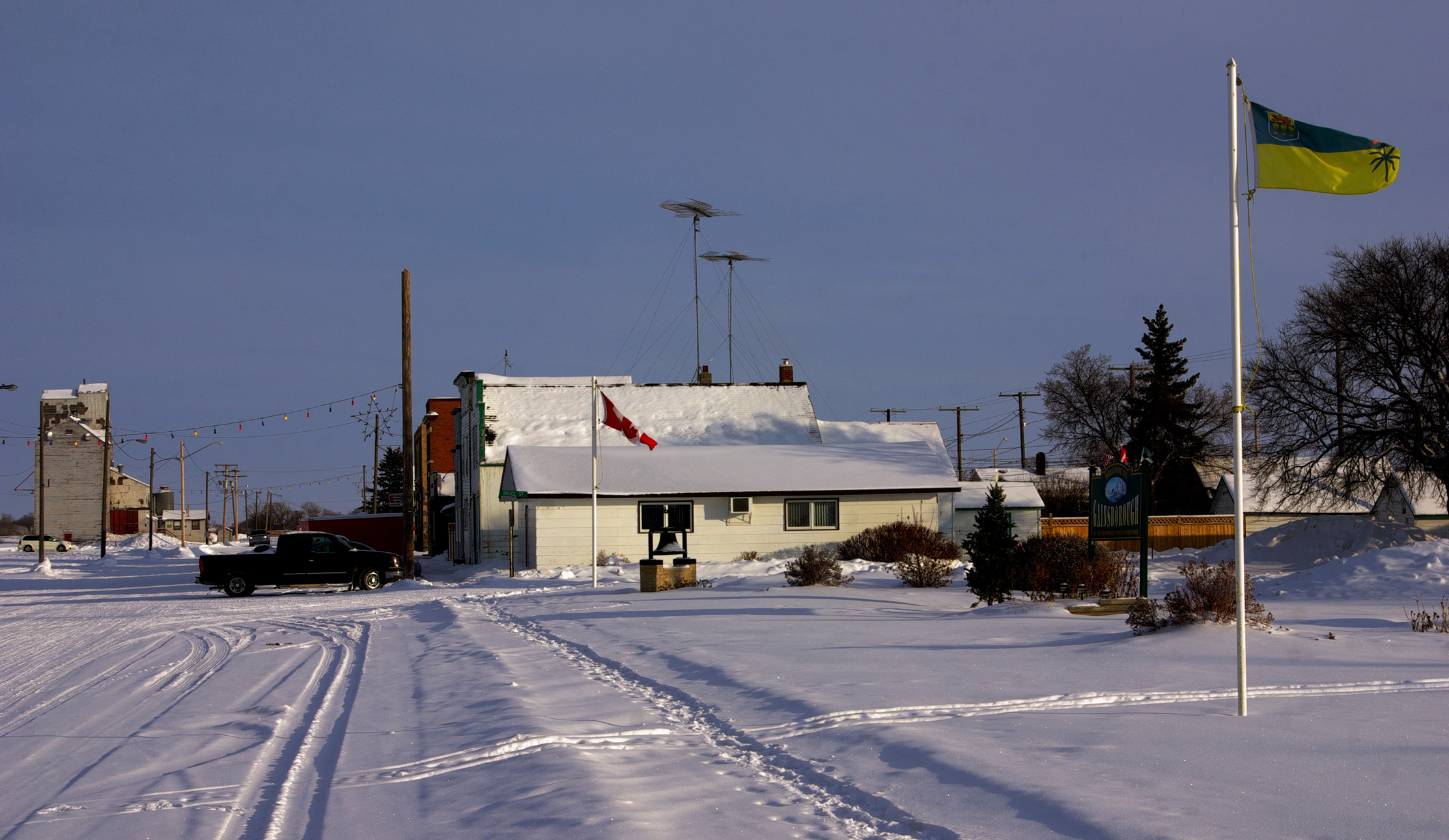
2011 image from viewpoint of 1978 painting "40 Below Zero" by William G. Hobbs

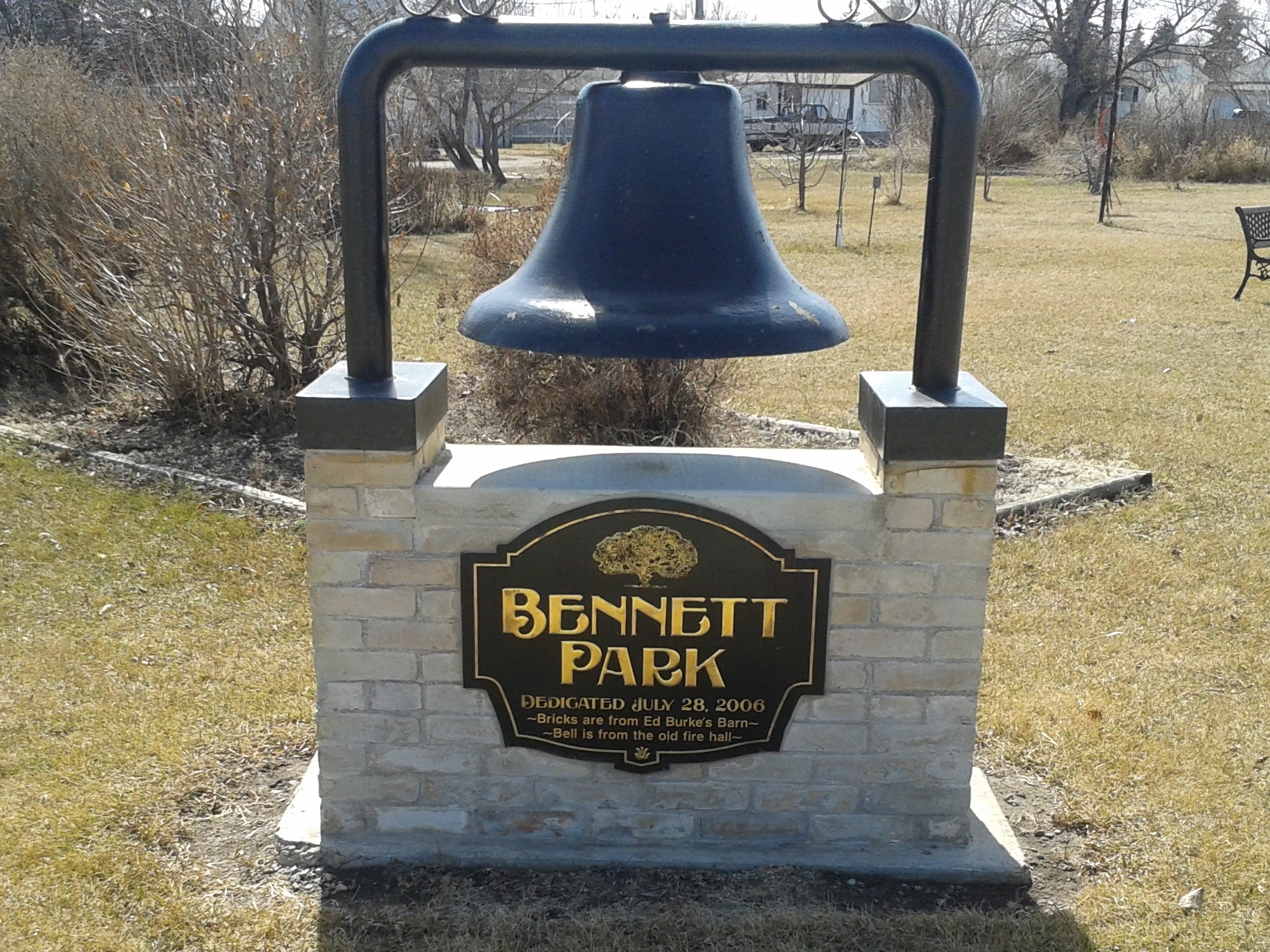
Bennett Park

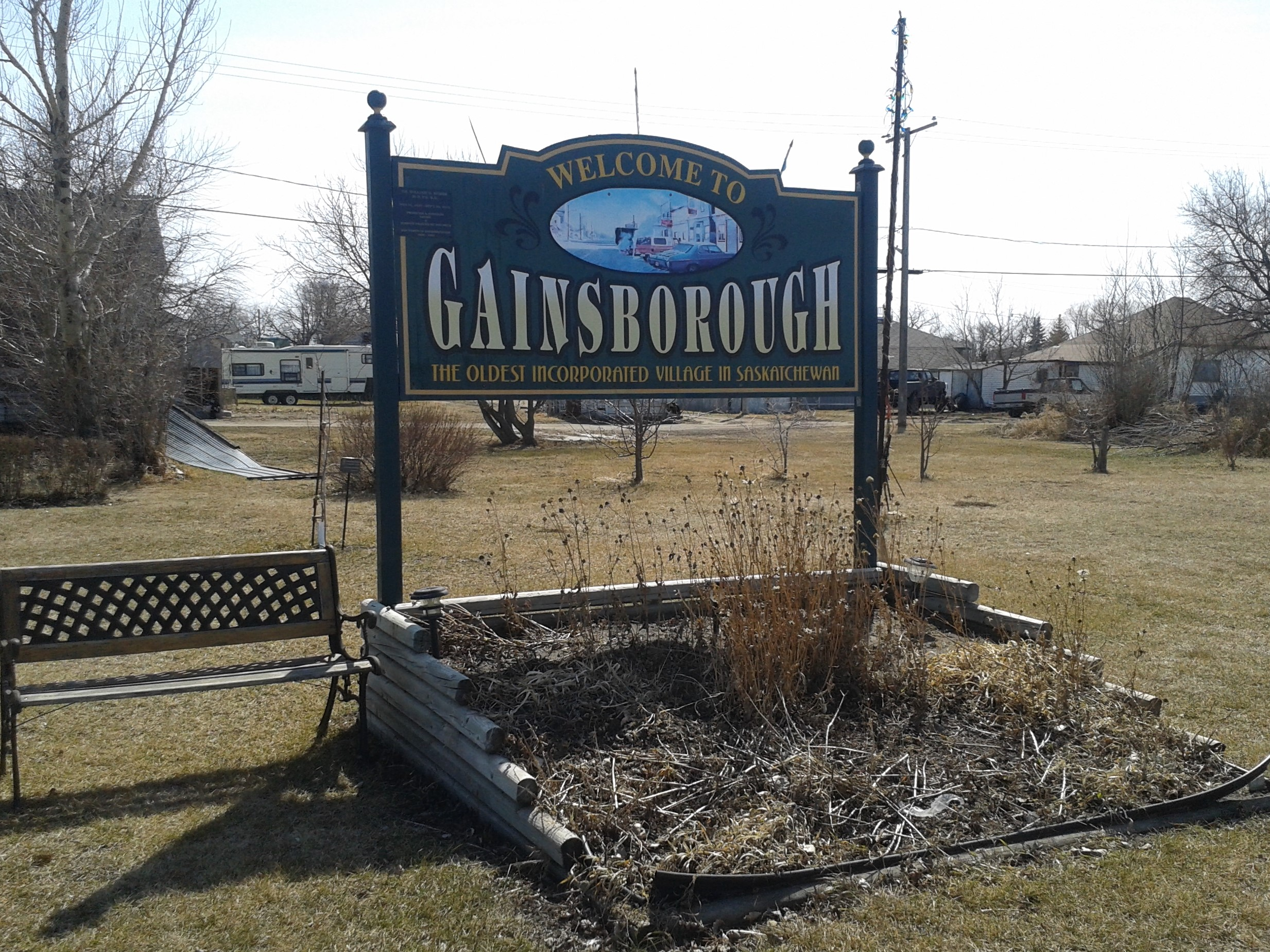
Gainsborough Welcome Sign

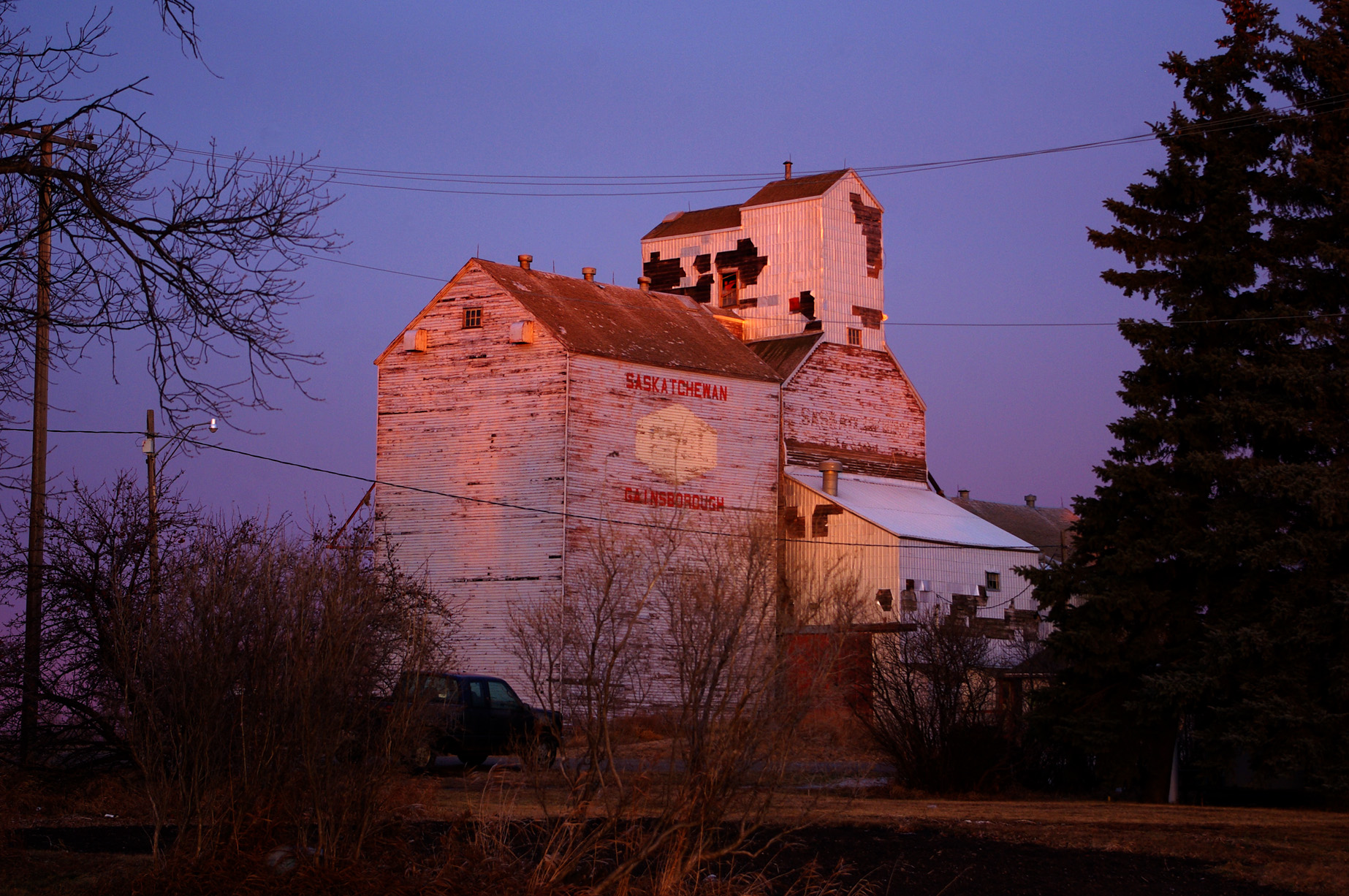
As of 2012, the former Saskatchewan Wheat Pool building is the last standing grain elevator in the village

== See also ==
- List of communities in Saskatchewan
- List of francophone communities in Saskatchewan
- List of villages in Saskatchewan
