= Rural Municipality of Calder No. 241 =

Rural municipality in Saskatchewan, Canada

Calder No. 241
- Rural municipality
- Rural Municipality of Calder No. 241
- Location of the RM of Calder No. 241 in Saskatchewan
- Coordinates: 51.257°N 101.728°W
- Country: Canada
- Province: Saskatchewan
- Census division: 9
- SARM division: 4
- Formed: January 1, 1913

Government
  - Reeve: Roy Derworiz
  - Governing body: RM of Calder No. 241 Council
  - Administrator: Shandy Wegwitz
  - Office location: Wroxton

Area (2016)
  - Land: 807.27 km^{2} (311.69 sq mi)

Population (2016)
  - Total: 370
  - Density: 0.5/km^{2} (1.3/sq mi)
- Time zone: CST
  - Summer (DST): CST
- Area codes: 306 and 639
- Website: Official website

The Rural Municipality of Calder No. 241 (2016 population: 370) is a rural municipality (RM) in the Canadian province of Saskatchewan within Census Division No. 9 and SARM Division No. 4.

== History ==
The RM of Calder No. 241 incorporated as a rural municipality on January 1, 1913.

== Geography ==
=== Communities and localities ===
The following urban municipalities are surrounded by the RM.

Villages

- Calder

The following unincorporated communities are within the RM.

Localities

- Kessock
- Wroxton

== Demographics ==
Population history (1981–2016)
Year	Pop.	±%
1981	855	—
1986	737	−13.8%
1991	638	−13.4%
1996	542	−15.0%
2001	509	−6.1%
2006	423	−16.9%
2011	322	−23.9%
2016	370	+14.9%
Source: Statistics Canada via Saskatchewan Bureau of Statistics

In the 2021 Census of Population conducted by Statistics Canada, the RM of Calder No. 241 had a population of 344 living in 164 of its 209 total private dwellings, a change of −7% from its 2016 population of 370. With a land area of 790.93 km^{2} (305.38 sq mi), it had a population density of 0.4/km^{2} (1.1/sq mi) in 2021.

In the 2016 Census of Population, the RM of Calder No. 241 recorded a population of 370 living in 166 of its 189 total private dwellings, a 14.9% change from its 2011 population of 322. With a land area of 807.27 km^{2} (311.69 sq mi), it had a population density of 0.5/km^{2} (1.2/sq mi) in 2016.

== Government ==
The RM of Calder No. 241 is governed by an elected municipal council and an appointed administrator that meets on the second Wednesday of every month. The reeve of the RM is Roy Derworiz while its administrator is Shandy Wegwitz. The RM's office is located in Wroxton.

== See also ==
- List of rural municipalities in Saskatchewan
