= Tantallon, Saskatchewan =

Village in Saskatchewan, Canada

Coordinates: 50°32′15″N 101°50′31″W

Location of Tantallon in Saskatchewan

Tantallon (2016 population: 91) is a village in the Canadian province of Saskatchewan within the Rural Municipality of Spy Hill No. 152 and Census Division No. 5. It is in the Qu'Appelle Valley along the Qu'Appelle River about 39 km east of Round Lake (Saskatchewan). The community celebrated its centennial in 2004.

The community was founded in 1904 and takes its name from a homestead (which was named "Tantallon" by Scottish Canadian James Moffat Douglas (former Canadian MP and Senator), who said this part of the Qu'Appelle Valley reminded him of Tantallon Castle in Scotland.

The village has an ice rink and a senior's centre. The community's school closed due to a lack of students, who are now bused to Esterhazy.

== History ==
Tantallon incorporated as a village on June 17, 1904.

== Demographics ==
Population history (1981–2016)
Year	Pop.	±%
1981	196	—
1986	163	−16.8%
1991	161	−1.2%
1996	137	−14.9%
2001	110	−19.7%
2006	105	−4.5%
2011	105	+0.0%
2016	91	−13.3%
Source: Statistics Canada via Saskatchewan Bureau of Statistics

In the 2021 Census of Population conducted by Statistics Canada, Tantallon had a population of 84 living in 48 of its 51 total private dwellings, a change of -7.7% from its 2016 population of 91. With a land area of 0.84 km^{2} (0.32 sq mi), it had a population density of 100.0/km^{2} (259.0/sq mi) in 2021.

In the 2016 Census of Population, the Village of Tantallon recorded a population of 91 living in 49 of its 49 total private dwellings, a -15.4% change from its 2011 population of 105. With a land area of 0.84 km^{2} (0.32 sq mi), it had a population density of 108.3/km^{2} (280.6/sq mi) in 2016.
