= Rural Municipality of Argyle No. 1 =

Rural municipality in Saskatchewan, Canada

Argyle No. 1
- Rural municipality
- Rural Municipality of Argyle No. 1
- Location of the RM of Argyle No. 1 in Saskatchewan
- Coordinates: 49.154°N 101.479°W
- Country: Canada
- Province: Saskatchewan
- Census division: 1
- SARM division: 1
- Federal riding: Souris—Moose Mountain
- Provincial riding: Cannington
- Formed: December 19, 1912

Government
  - Reeve: Jack Ryckman
  - Governing body: RM of Argyle No. 1 Council
  - Administrator: Erin McMillen
  - Office location: Gainsborough

Area (2016)
  - Land: 579.88 km^{2} (223.89 sq mi)

Population (2016)
  - Total: 290
  - Density: 0.5/km^{2} (1.3/sq mi)
- Time zone: CST
  - Summer (DST): CST
- Postal code: S0C 0Z0
- Area codes: 306 and 639

The Rural Municipality of Argyle No. 1 (2016 population: 290) is a rural municipality (RM) in the Canadian province of Saskatchewan within Census Division No. 1 and SARM Division No. 1. It is located in the southeast corner of the province along Highway 18.

== History ==
The RM of Argyle No. 1 incorporated as a rural municipality on December 19, 1912. Prior to it was Local Improvement District No. 1.

The exact derivation of the RM's name is unknown, as numerous Argyles and Argylls exist in Western Canada. Argyle Street in Regina and the Rural Municipality of Argyle in Manitoba were both intended to honour Sir John Campbell, 9th Duke of Argyll and fourth Governor General of Canada. Why both adopted a more phonetic spelling of the name, most commonly used to refer to a type of knitting pattern, is unknown.

== Geography ==
The eastern boundary of the RM is the Municipality of Two Borders, in Manitoba. The southern boundary of the RM is the United States border at Renville County and Bottineau County, both in North Dakota.

=== Communities and localities ===
The following urban municipalities are surrounded by the RM.

Villages

- Gainsborough

== Demographics ==
Population history (1981–2016)
Year	Pop.	±%
1981	408	—
1986	396	−2.9%
1991	360	−9.1%
1996	301	−16.4%
2001	272	−9.6%
2006	267	−1.8%
2011	270	+1.1%
2016	290	+7.4%
2021	331	+14.1%
Source: Statistics Canada via Saskatchewan Bureau of Statistics

In the 2021 Census of Population conducted by Statistics Canada, the RM of Argyle No. 1 had a population of 331 living in 125 of its 142 total private dwellings, a change of 14.1% from its 2016 population of 290. With a land area of 567.05 km^{2} (218.94 sq mi), it had a population density of 0.6/km^{2} (1.5/sq mi) in 2021.

In the 2016 Census of Population, the RM of Argyle No. 1 recorded a population of 290 living in 105 of its 110 total private dwellings, a 7.4% change from its 2011 population of 270. With a land area of 579.88 km^{2} (223.89 sq mi), it had a population density of 0.5/km^{2} (1.3/sq mi) in 2016.

== Government ==
The RM of Argyle No. 1 is governed by an elected municipal council and an appointed administrator that meets on the second Tuesday of every month. The reeve of the RM is Jack Ryckman while its administrator is Erin McMillen. The RM's office is located in Gainsborough.

== Transportation ==
Rail

- Estevan Section C.P.R—serves Elva, Pierson, Gainsborough, Carievale, Carnduff, Glen Ewen, Oxbow, Rapeard

Roads

- Highway 18—serves Gainsborough
- Highway 600

== See also ==
- List of rural municipalities in Saskatchewan
