= White Butte, Saskatchewan =

Region in Saskatchewan, Canada

White Butte
- Region
- Location of White Butte White Butte (Canada)
- Coordinates: 50°28′N 104°25′W
- Country: Canada
- Province: Saskatchewan
- Treaty 4 signed: 1874
- Area settled: 1882

Area
  - Land: 899.9 km^{2} (347.5 sq mi)

Population (2021)
  - Total: 12,805
  - Density: 14.2/km^{2} (37/sq mi)
- Time zone: UTC−06:00 (CST)
- Postal code: S0G, S4L
- Area codes: 306, 639

White Butte is a region in southern Saskatchewan that comprises the Rural Municipality (RM) of Edenwold No. 158, the towns of White City, Pilot Butte, and Balgonie, and the village of Edenwold. A largely suburban area; it is located directly east of Regina. As of 2021, White Butte has a total population of 12,805. The name of the region dates back to 1982 when the White Butte Ski Trails first opened in the area.

== Etymology ==
The region's name is a combination of the names White City and Pilot Butte, which dates back to 1982 when the White Butte Ski Trails first opened in the area.

== History ==
Indigenous peoples of the prairies inhabited the area for many years before any European settlement. Aboriginal people, who camped near Boggy Creek, used the Butte in Pilot Butte as a lookout and signal point.

European settlement in the area can be traced back to the 1840s. With the construction of the railway through the region in 1882, the towns of Pilot Butte and Balgonie were founded. In the following years, settlers began farming in the district and the two towns developed.

The post office in Balgonie was founded in 1883, and the settlement became a village in 1903 and a town in 1907. Pilot Butte followed this path when it became a town in 1913. At the beginning of World War I, the towns were of substantial size. The war had a harmful effect on the towns, however, as Pilot Butte was disbanded in 1923 because of the loss of residents. Balgonie also suffered as the town's population plummeted in the 1930s and 1940s.

In the late 1950s, the Trans-Canada Highway was completed and living in Pilot Butte and Balgonie began to become a popular option for those who wanted to commute to work in the city. Pilot Butte re-acquired village status in 1963 and grew substantially, becoming a town in 1979.

By this point, the community of White City had been formed and was growing as quickly as Pilot Butte and Balgonie. White City acquired town status in 2000 and it passed Pilot Butte in population in 2011, becoming the largest town in White Butte. All three towns in White Butte have experienced substantial growth in the past ten years.

In 2020, the Village of Edenwold and the RM initiated a process to establish Saskatchewan's first municipal district.

== Communities ==
=== White City and Emerald Park ===
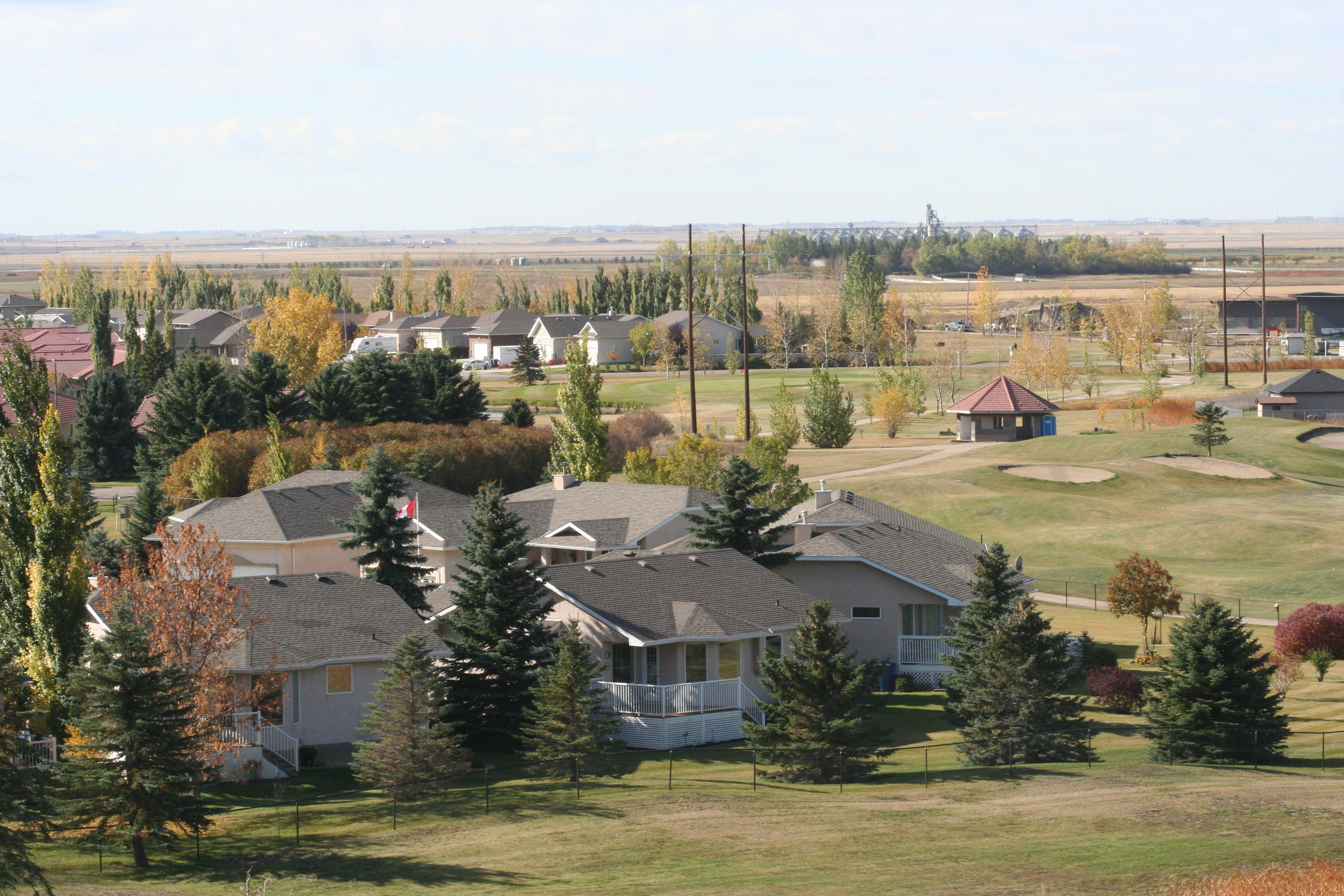
Emerald Park, administered by the RM of Edenwold No. 158 and adjacent to White City

White City, named after White City, London, is a town in Saskatchewan situated at the intersection of the Trans-Canada Highway and Highway 48. The town is primarily populated by people who commute to work in Regina. White City was founded in 1958 by Pilot Butte resident Johnston Lipsett and became a hamlet in 1958, a village in 1967 and a town in 2000.

Emerald Park is an unincorporated community adjacent to White City that is administered by the RM of Edenwold No. 158. The community is home to approximately 1,700 residents in addition to its commercial and industrial areas which contain numerous businesses.

=== Pilot Butte ===
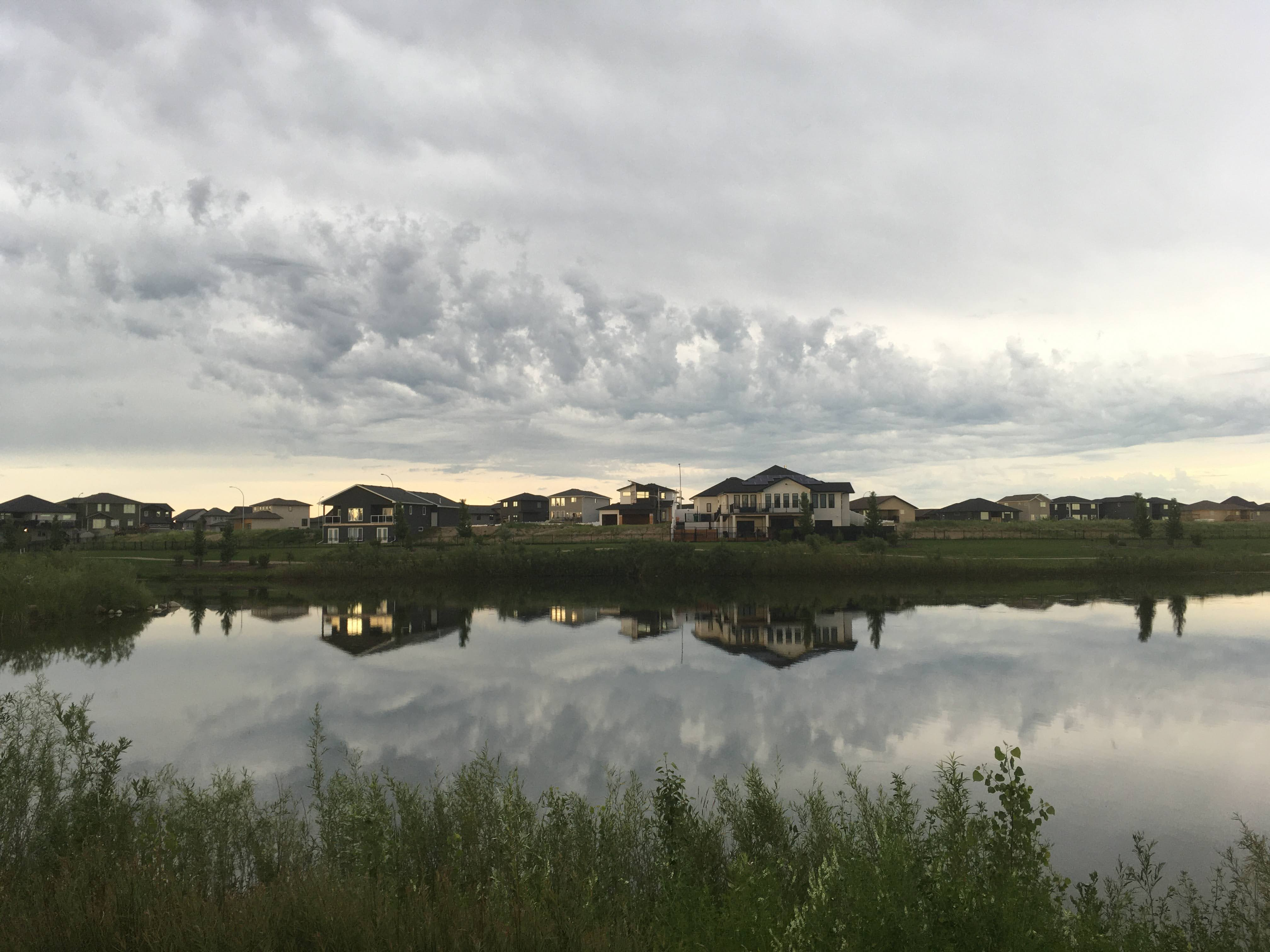
Houses along the lake in Discovery Ridge within Pilot Butte

Pilot Butte, meaning "lookout point", is the 29th largest municipality in Saskatchewan located between Highway 46 and the Trans-Canada Highway. The town was settled in 1882. Pilot Butte's early development was more substantial than neighbouring towns thanks to the town's brick plants, along with its sand and gravel deposits. In 1995, the Pilot Butte Storm destroyed much of the town. In recent years, the population and size of Pilot Butte has begun growing at a high rate. From 2016 to 2021, Pilot Butte was the fastest growing population centre in Saskatchewan.

=== Balgonie ===
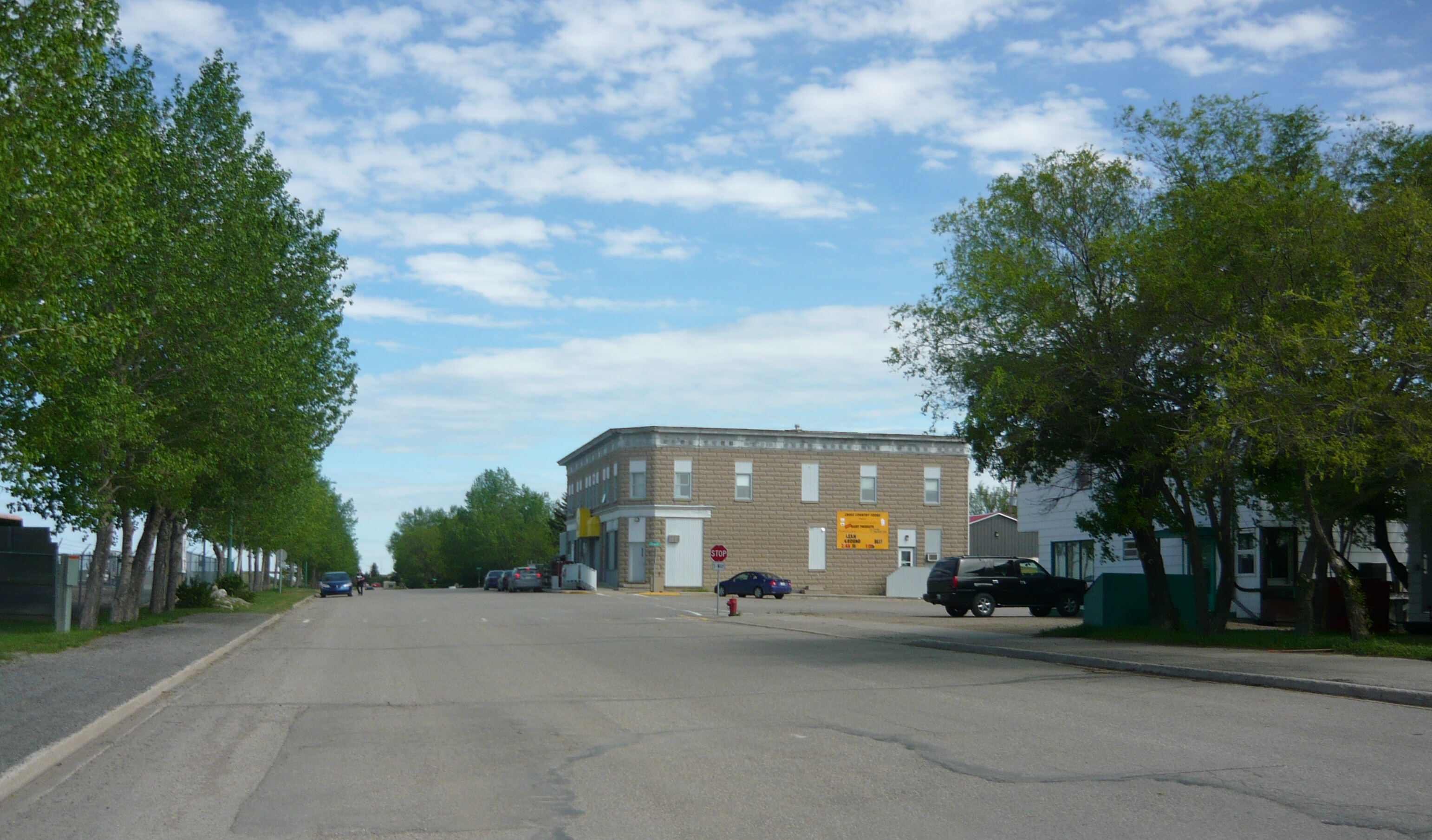
Intersection of Main Street and Railway Street in Balgonie

Balgonie, named after Balgonie Castle in Scotland, is a town in Saskatchewan situated at the intersection of the Trans-Canada Highway, Highway 46, and Highway 10. The community was settled in 1882, became a village in 1903, and was incorporated as a town in 1907. Balgonie is home to Greenall High School, where students from White Butte go to high school.

=== Other communities ===
In addition to the three towns and one rural municipality in the region, Edenwold is a village in Saskatchewan located on Highways 364 and 640. Edenwold has the same name as the RM of Edenwold No. 158 that surrounds it. White Butte is also home to organized hamlet of Crawford Estates, located between Pilot Butte and White City along Highway 362. Other populated localities in the region include Coppersands, Dreghorn, Franksburg, Frankslake, Jameson, Kathrintal Colony, Milaty, Poplar Park, Richardson, Seitzville, and Zehner.

== Demographics ==
List of municipalities in White Butte
Name	Type	Population (2021)	Population (2016)	Change	Population density	Dwellings
Balgonie	Town	1,756	1,765	−0.5	369.2/km²	628
Edenwold	Village	243	233	+4.3	350.6/km²	95
Edenwold No. 158	Rural municipality	4,466	4,490	−0.5	5.3/km²	1,576
Pilot Butte	Town	2,638	2,137	+23.4	462.3/km²	999
White City	Town	3,702	3,099	+19.5	489.7/km²	1,200
Total	–	12,805	11,724	+9.2	14.2/km²	4,498

== Government ==
Each municipality in White Butte is governed separately by its own respective municipal council. This consists of four urban municipalities—the towns of White City, Pilot Butte, and Balgonie as well as the Village of Edenwold—and the RM of Edenwold No. 158.

=== Regional planning committee ===
The White Butte Regional Planning Committee (WBRPC) was founded in 2008 by the RM of Edenwold No. 158 and the towns of White City, Pilot Butte, and Balgonie. Following its inception, Edenwold, Regina, and the RM of Sherwood No. 159 joined the WBRPC. The work of the WBRPC has been linked to the development of a local RCMP detachment in White Butte, various projects related to wastewater and clean water, and partnerships in local emergency response and fire protection. In 2018, Pilot Butte, Balgonie, and the RM of Edenwold No. 158 left the WBRPC.

== See also ==
- List of communities in Saskatchewan
