= White City-Qu'Appelle =

Saskatchewan electoral district

Provincial electoral district
- Legislature: Legislative Assembly of Saskatchewan
MLA
Brad Crassweller
Saskatchewan
- District created: 2022
- First contested: 30th
- Last contested: 2024

Demographics
- Electors: 14,325
- Area (km²): 2,468.9
- Census division: Division No. 6
- Census subdivision(s): Balgonie, B-Say-Tah, Edenwold, Edenwold No. 158, Fort Qu'Appelle, Indian Head No. 156, Katepwa, Lumsden No. 189, McLean, Muscowpetung 80, North Qu'Appelle No. 187, Pasqua 79, Piapot 75, Pilot Butte, Qu'Appelle, Sherwood No. 159, South Qu'Appelle No. 157, Treaty Four Reserve Grounds 77, White City

White City-Qu'Appelle (also spelled Qu'appelle) is a provincial electoral district for the Legislative Assembly of Saskatchewan, Canada.

The riding was created by redistribution in 2022, taking territory from Regina Wascana Plains and Indian Head-Milestone. It will be formally contested in the 30th Saskatchewan general election. It is named after the town of White City and the Qu'Appelle River, which forms the northern boundary of the riding. The riding is largely exurban in character, and shares its western boundary with the city of Regina. It also contains three First Nations: Muscowpetung, Pasqua, and Piapot.

== Election results ==
2024 Saskatchewan general election
Party	Candidate	Votes	%	±%
Saskatchewan	Brad Crassweller	5,298	55.76	-10.94
New Democratic	Grady Birns	3,593	37.81	+9.41
Saskatchewan United	Darcy Thiele	611	6.43	–
Total valid votes		9,502	99.44	
Total rejected ballots		54	0.56	
Turnout		9,556	65.80	
Eligible voters		14,523		
Saskatchewan hold		Swing		
Source: Elections Saskatchewan

2020 provincial election redistributed results
Party	%
Saskatchewan	66.7
New Democratic	28.4
Green	1.9
Others	3.0
