= Saskatchewan Highway 364 =

Provincial highway in Saskatchewan, Canada

Highway 364

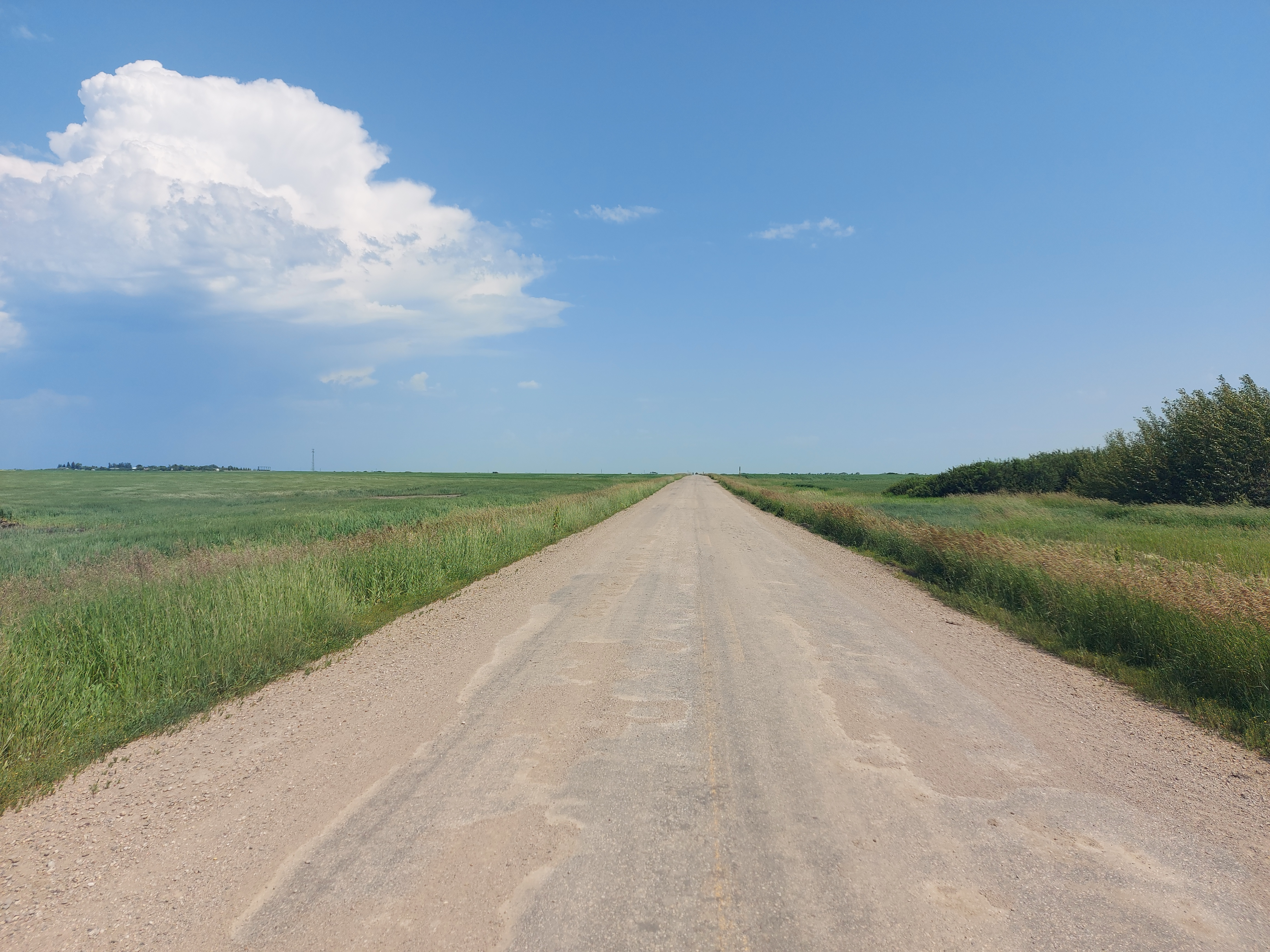
- Highway 364

Route information
- Maintained by Ministry of Highways and Infrastructure
- Length: 37.3 km (23.2 mi)

Major junctions
- South end: Highway 1 (TCH) / Highway 46 / Highway 622 near Balgonie
- North end: Highway 10 near Edgeley

Location
- Country: Canada
- Province: Saskatchewan
- Rural municipalities: Edenwold, South Qu'Appelle

Highway system
- Provincial highways in Saskatchewan
← Highway 363	→ Highway 365

Highway 364 is a provincial highway in the Canadian province of Saskatchewan. It runs from the interchange between the Trans-Canada Highway (Highway 1, Exit 217), Highway 46, and Highway 622 near Balgonie to Highway 10 near Edgeley. It is about 37 kilometres (23 mi) long.

Highway 364 intersects Highway 734 and Highway 640. It passes by the communities of Edenwold and Avonhurst.

== Route description ==
Highway 364 begins in the Rural Municipality of Edenwold No. 158 at an intersection with Highway 46 on the western edge of the town of Balgonie, just 0.3 kilometres (0.19 mi) north of Highway 46's interchange with both Highway 1 and Highway 622 (Exit 217), with the road continuing southwest as a Service Road for Highway 1. It heads eastward into Balgonie, curving due northward as it passes through neighbourhoods and crosses the Canadian Pacific Railway's Indian Head subdivision as it bypasses downtown to the west. Leaving Balgonie, the highway travels through rural farmland for several kilometres, going through a slight switchback as it crosses Highway 734 on its way to an intersection with the south end of Highway 640, where it makes a sudden sharp right, and immediately passing just to the south of the village of Edenwold, connected via Brewer Street. Entering the Rural Municipality of South Qu'Appelle No. 157, Highway 364 heads due east through rural areas, paralleling Canadian National Railway's Qu'Appelle subdivision and travelling just to the south of the hamlet of Avonhurst, connected via Range Road 2162. Continuing on, it crosses a small creek and curving around a small lake before coming to an end on the south side of the hamlet of Edgeley at an angled intersection between Highway 10 and Range Road 2152 (access road that provides access to the hamlet). The entire length of Highway 364 is a paved, two-lane highway.

== Major intersections ==
From west to east:

Rural municipality	Location	km	mi	Destinations	Notes
Edenwold No. 158	Balgonie	0.0	0.0	Highway 46 to Highway 1 (TCH) / Highway 622 – Pilot Butte, Regina, Winnipeg	Southern terminus; 0.3 kilometres (0.19 mi) north of Highway 46 interchange with Highway 1 (Exit 217)
Edenwold No. 158		11.0	6.8	Highway 734 (Correction Line Road) – Zehner	
Edenwold No. 158		17.5	10.9	Highway 640 north – Cupar	Southern terminus of Hwy 640
Edenwold No. 158	Edenwold	18.6	11.6	Brewer Street	
South Qu'Appelle No. 157		27.3	17.0	Range Road 2162 – Avonhurst	
South Qu'Appelle No. 157	Edgeley	37.3	23.2	Highway 10 – Fort Qu'Appelle, Yorkton, Regina Range Road 2152 – Edgeley	Northern terminus
1.000 mi = 1.609 km; 1.000 km = 0.621 mi

== See also ==
- Transportation in Saskatchewan
- Roads in Saskatchewan
