= Prairie Valley School Division =

School district in Saskatchewan, Canada

Prairie Valley School Division School Division No. 208

Location
- P.O. Box 1937, 3080 Albert Street North; Regina, Saskatchewan; S4P 3E1 Balcarres, Balgonie, Bethune, Broadview, Cupar, Edenwold, Fort Qu'Appelle, Grenfell, Indian Head, Kelliher, Kipling, Langbank, Lemberg, Lipton, Lumsden, McLean, Milestone, Montmartre, Neudorf, Pense, Pilot Butte, Qu'Appelle, Regina Beach, Sedley, Southey, Vibank, White City, Whitewood, Wolseley Canada

District information
- Schools: 38

Students and staff
- Students: 8,904 (2025)

Other information
- Website: www.pvsd.ca

Prairie Valley School Division No. 208 comprises 38 schools in 30 communities. Prairie Valley SD belongs to Region 4, Regina along with Holy Trinity R.C.S.S.D No. 22, Prairie South School Division No. 210, Regina School Division No. 4, and Regina R.C.S.S.D No. 81

Schools of Prairie Valley School Division
School	Location	Grade start	Grade end
Arm River Colony School	Lumsden		
Balcarres Community School	Balcarres		
Balgonie Elementary School	Balgonie		
Bert Fox Community High School	Fort Qu'Appelle		
Broadview School	Broadview		
Clive Draycott School	Bethune		
Cupar School	Cupar		
Dr. Isman Elementary School	Wolseley		
Edenwold School	Edenwold		
Fort Qu'Appelle Elementary Community School	Fort Qu'Appelle		
Grenfell Elementary Community School	Grenfell		
Grenfell High Community School	Grenfell		
Indian Head Elementary School	Indian Head		
Indian Head High School	Indian Head		
James Hamblin School	Qu'Appelle		
Kelliher School	Kelliher		
Kennedy Langbank School	Langbank		
Kipling School	Kipling		
Lajord Colony School	White City		
Lipton School	Lipton		
Lumsden Elementary School	Lumsden		
Lumsden High School	Lumsden		
McLean School	McLean		
Milestone School	Milestone		
Montmartre School	Montmartre		
North Valley Elementary School	Neudorf		
North Valley High School	Lemberg		
Pense School	Pense		
Pilot Butte School	Pilot Butte		
Robert Southey School	Southey		
Sedley School	Sedley		
South Shore School	Regina Beach		
Stewart Nicks School	Regina		
Vibank Regional School	Vibank		
White City School	White City		
Whitewood School	Whitewood		
Wolseley High School	Wolseley		

== Amalgamation ==
Aspen Grove SD #144 amalgamated in 2006 with Prairie Valley School Division No. 208.

Schools of defunct Aspen Grove SD #144
School
Balcarres Community School
Broadview School
Dr. Isman Elementary School
Francis Elementary
Glenavon School
Grenfell Elementary School
Grenfell High School
Kennedy Langback School
Kipling High School
Montmartre School
North Valley Elementary
North Valley High School
Odessa School
Sedley School
Vibank School
Whitewood School
Windthorst School
Wolseley High School

== See also ==
- List of school divisions in Saskatchewan
