= White Butte =

White Butte may refer to any of the following:

- White Butte (North Dakota), the highest point in North Dakota, United States
- White Butte, South Dakota, a community in South Dakota, United States
- White Butte (Perkins County, South Dakota), a summit in South Dakota
- White Butte, Saskatchewan, a community in Saskatchewan, Canada
- White Butte Trails Recreation Site, a park in Saskatchewan
- Whites Butte, a prominence adjacent the course of the Colorado River in Arizona, United States
