= Indian Head-Milestone =

Provincial electoral district in Saskatchewan, Canada

Coordinates: 50°15′N 104°00′W

Saskatchewan electoral district

Provincial electoral district
- Legislature: Legislative Assembly of Saskatchewan
MLA
Don McMorris
Saskatchewan
- District created: 1994
- First contested: 1995
- Last contested: 2020

Demographics
- Electors: 11,352
- Census division(s): Division 6, 7, 10

Indian Head-Milestone was a provincial electoral district for the Legislative Assembly of Saskatchewan, Canada. Located in southern Saskatchewan, the riding was created through the Representation Act, 1994 (Saskatchewan) by combining the riding of Indian Head-Wolseley with part of the riding of Bengough-Milestone. With the final report of the 2022 boundary commission, the riding was dissolved ahead of the 2024 Saskatchewan general election, with the bulk of its population going to the new riding of White City-Qu'appelle.

Communities in the district included the towns of Balgonie, Indian Head, Pilot Butte, Milestone, Rouleau, and Fort Qu'Appelle; and the villages of Edenwold, Odessa, Vibank, Avonlea, and Wilcox.

== Members of the Legislative Assembly ==
Legislature	Years	Member	Party
23rd	1995–1999	Lorne Scott	New Democrat
24th	1999–2003	Don McMorris	Saskatchewan Party
25th	2003–2007	Don McMorris	Saskatchewan Party
26th	2007–2011	Don McMorris	Saskatchewan Party
27th	2011–2016	Don McMorris	Saskatchewan Party
28th	2016	Don McMorris	Saskatchewan Party
28th	2016–2017	Don McMorris	Independent
28th	2017–2020	Don McMorris	Saskatchewan Party
29th	2020–present	Don McMorris	Saskatchewan Party

== Election results ==
View source data.
Graph of election results in Regina—Qu'Apelle (since 1988, minor parties that never got 2% of the vote or didn't run consistently are omitted)

2020 Saskatchewan general election
Party	Candidate	Votes	%	±%
Saskatchewan	Don McMorris	5,626	67.02	-0.33
New Democratic	Jared Clarke	2,371	28.24	+3.92
Progressive Conservative	Elvin Mandziak	251	2.99	+0.03
Green	Billy Patterson	147	1.75	-0.13
Total valid votes		8,395	99.55	
Total rejected ballots		38	0.45	–
Turnout		8,433	–	–
Eligible voters		–		
Saskatchewan hold		Swing		–
Source: Elections Saskatchewan

2016 Saskatchewan general election
Party	Candidate	Votes	%	±%
Saskatchewan	Don McMorris	5,118	67.35	-8.81
New Democratic	Ashley Nemeth	1,848	24.32	+4.30
Liberal	David Delainey	264	3.47	-
Progressive Conservative	Sheila Olson	225	2.96	-
Green	Andrea Huang	143	1.88	-1.94
Total valid votes		7,598	100.0	
Eligible voters		–		
Source: Elections Saskatchewan

2011 Saskatchewan general election: Indian Head-Milestone
Party	Candidate	Votes	%	±%
Saskatchewan	Don McMorris	5,766	76.16	+12.20
NDP	Richard Klyne	1,516	20.02	-7.49
Green	Shelby Hersberger	289	3.82	+1.39
Total		7,571	100.00	

2007 Saskatchewan general election: Indian Head-Milestone
Party	Candidate	Votes	%	±%
Saskatchewan	Don McMorris	5,351	63.96	+14.70
NDP	Corinne Pauliuk	2,301	27.51	-11.92
Liberal	Michael Hiebert	510	6.10	-2.66
Green	Dagan Harding	203	2.43	-
Total		8,365	100.00	

2003 Saskatchewan general election: Indian Head-Milestone
Party	Candidate	Votes	%	±%
Saskatchewan	Don McMorris	4,070	49.26	+1.17
NDP	Lorne Scott	3,258	39.43	+10.84
Liberal	Anthony Gavrielides	724	8.76	-12.24
Western Independence	Ron Borys	211	2.55	–
Total		8,263	100.00	

1999 Saskatchewan general election: Indian Head-Milestone
Party	Candidate	Votes	%	±%
Saskatchewan	Don McMorris	3,877	48.09	–
NDP	Lorne Scott	2,305	28.59	-14.86
Liberal	Larry Schultz	1,693	21.00	-17.92
New Green	Garth Herman	187	2.32	–
Total		8,062	100.00	

1995 Saskatchewan general election: Indian Head-Milestone
Party	Candidate	Votes	%	±%
NDP	Lorne Scott	3,440	43.45	–
Liberal	Steve Helfrick	3,081	38.92	–
Prog. Conservative	Dale Paslawski	1,396	17.63	–
Total		7,917	100.00	

== See also ==
- List of Saskatchewan provincial electoral districts
- List of Saskatchewan general elections
- Canadian provincial electoral districts
