= Saskatchewan Highway 362 =

Provincial highway in Saskatchewan, Canada

Highway 362
- Pilot Butte access road

Route information
- Maintained by Ministry of Highways and Infrastructure
- Length: 4.2 km (2.6 mi)

Major junctions
- South end: Highway 1 (TCH) / Highway 624 near Emerald Park
- North end: Highway 46 / Highway 624 at Pilot Butte

Location
- Country: Canada
- Province: Saskatchewan
- Rural municipalities: Edenwold

Highway system
- Provincial highways in Saskatchewan
← Highway 361	→ Highway 363

Highway 362, also known as the Pilot Butte access road, is an unsigned provincial highway in the Canadian province of Saskatchewan. It runs from the Trans-Canada Highway (Highway 1) to Highway 46 along the western edge of Pilot Butte, entirely concurrent (overlapped) with Highway 624. It is a paved two-lane highway for its entire length and is about 4 kilometres (2.5 mi) long.

The intersection of Highway 362 and Highway 1 is the site of a diverging diamond interchange as part of the Regina Bypass, located at Exit 229 on Highway 1.

== Major intersections ==
From south to north:

Rural municipality	Location	km	mi	Destinations	Notes
Edenwold No. 158		11.2– 11.6	7.0– 7.2	Highway 1 (TCH) – Regina, Winnipeg Highway 624 south – Emerald Park	Diverging Diamond Interchange; Hwy 1 Exit 229; southern terminus; southern end of Hwy 624 concurrency; road continues as southbound Hwy 624
Edenwold No. 158	Pilot Butte	14.7	9.1	1st Avenue – Pilot Butte	
Edenwold No. 158	Pilot Butte	15.6	9.7	Highway 46 – Regina, Balgonie Highway 624 north – Zehner	Northern terminus; northern end of Hwy 624 concurrency; road continues as northbound Hwy 624
1.000 mi = 1.609 km; 1.000 km = 0.621 mi: Concurrency terminus

== See also ==
- Transportation in Saskatchewan
- Roads in Saskatchewan
