= Saskatchewan Highway 46 =

Provincial highway in Saskatchewan, Canada

Highway 46
- Highway 46 highlighted in red

Route information
- Maintained by Ministry of Highways and Infrastructure
- Length: 22 km (14 mi)

Major junctions
- West end: Ring Road in Regina
- Highway 362 at Pilot Butte; Highway 364 at Balgonie
- East end: Highway 1 (TCH) at Balgonie

Location
- Country: Canada
- Province: Saskatchewan
- Rural municipalities: Sherwood, Edenwold
- Major cities: Regina
- Towns: Pilot Butte, Balgonie

Highway system
- Provincial highways in Saskatchewan
← Highway 45	→ Highway 47

Highway 46 is a provincial highway in the Canadian province of Saskatchewan. It runs from the Ring Road at Regina to Highway 1 and Highway 364 near Balgonie; it is about 22 kilometres (14 mi) long. Highway 46 intersects Highway 362 and Highway 624 and passes through the communities of Pilot Butte and Balgonie; it is known as McDonald Street within Regina city limits.

== History ==
The present alignment of Highway 46 used to be the original alignment of Highway 1, but was reverted to a gravel grid road when the Trans-Canada Highway was realigned entering Regina along Victoria Avenue in the 1950s. In the early 1980s, Highway 46 was assigned to the route and was subsequently paved from Regina to Pilot Butte. In the early 1990s, the highway was paved from Pilot Butte to Balgonie. It was again re-paved in the summer of 2014.

There are two previous uses of Highway 46 within Saskatchewan. The original route ran from former Provincial Highway 29 at Plenty, through Ruthilda, to Provincial Highway 1 (present-day Highway 4) near Biggar. The route was decommissioned in the 1930s when Highway 51 was constructed between Kerrobert and Biggar. A second use was in the 1960s when Highway 46 travelled from Highway 4 near Val Marie to Claydon; the route became part of Highway 18 in the 1970s.

== Major intersections ==
Rural municipality	Location	km	mi	Destinations	Notes
City of Regina		0.0	0.0	Ring Road to Highway 1 (TCH) / Highway 6 / Highway 11	Interchange; western terminus; continues as McDonald Street
Sherwood No. 159	No major junctions				
Edenwold No. 158	Pilot Butte	10.8	6.7	Highway 362 south / Highway 624 north – Emerald Park, Zehner	
Edenwold No. 158	Balgonie	21.8	13.5	Highway 364 north – Balgonie, Edenwold	
Edenwold No. 158	Balgonie	22.3	13.9	Highway 1 (TCH) – Winnipeg, Regina Highway 622 south – Kronau	Interchange; Highway 1 exit 217; eastern terminus; continues as Highway 622
1.000 mi = 1.609 km; 1.000 km = 0.621 mi

== See also ==
- Transportation in Saskatchewan
- Roads in Saskatchewan
