= Greenall School =

Location
- Box 70; Balgonie, Saskatchewan, S0G 0E0; Canada; 50.488°N 104.264°W

Information
- School type: High School
- Motto: Excellence Doesn't Happen by Accident Values: Growth and Resilience with Integrity Together
- School board: Prairie Valley School Division no. 208
- Principal: John Harvey
- Grades: 9-12
- Enrollment: 751
- Language: English and French
- Area: Balgonie
- Colours: Navy Blue, White and Gold
- Team name: Griffins
- Website: www.pvsd.ca/school/greenall/

Greenall School, also known as Greenall High School, is a secondary education institute located in Balgonie, Saskatchewan, which offers grades 9 through 12. It serves students from Balgonie, as well as the nearby towns/communities of Coppersands, Edenwold, Kronau, McLean, Pilot Butte and White City. Greenall offers a variety of extracurricular activities, including an advanced placement academic program.

Greenall School has previously been a combined middle school and high school, serving grades 4-12.
