= Emerald Park, Saskatchewan =

Emerald Park
- Unincorporated community
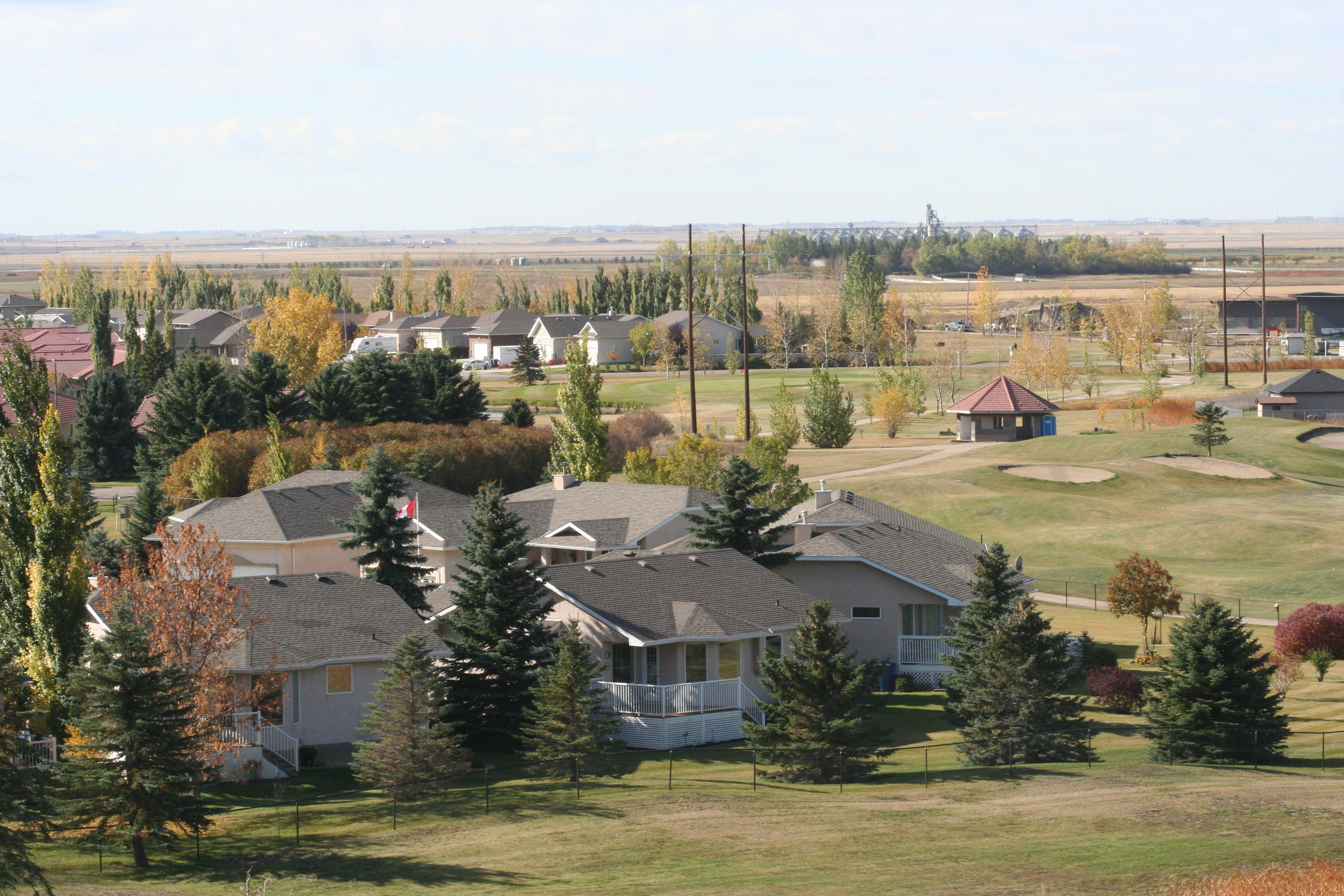
- Houses and golf course in Emerald Park

- Emerald Park in Saskatchewan
- Coordinates: 50.442°N 104.388°W
- Country: Canada
- Province: Saskatchewan
- Rural municipality: Edenwold No. 158
- Founded: 1984

Government
  - Governing body: Edenwold No. 158 Council
  - Mayor: Brett Huber

Population (2021)
  - Total: 1,553
- Time zone: UTC-6 (CST)
- Forward sortation area: S4L
- Area code: +1-306
- Highways: Highway 1

Emerald Park is an unincorporated community in Saskatchewan, Canada, within the Rural Municipality (RM) of Edenwold No. 158. It is 9 km (5.6 mi) east of Regina and is adjacent to the Town of White City.

The RM of Edenwold No. 158 was home to 4,490 residents in 2016 with an estimated 1,700 of those residents calling Emerald Park home.

Over 130 businesses operate from Emerald Park, Great Plains Industrial Park and the Butte Business District.

== History ==
Emerald Park was developed in the mid-1980s. Initially, an auction house, agriculture implement dealerships and a gas station were the first structures in the area.

Not long afterward a developer had a vision for a community of larger-lot homes built around a golf course.

Now, Emerald Park is home to several homes, industrial, retail and commercial businesses and is a full-service community.

The RM of Edenwold office is located at 100 Hutchence Road in Emerald Park.

== Demographics ==
Population history (1986–2021)
Year	Pop.	±%
1986	159	—
1991	524	+229.6%
1996	689	+31.5%
2001	907	+31.6%
2006	1,426	+57.2%
2011	1,857	+30.2%
2016	1,696	−8.7%
2021	1,553	−8.4%
Source: Statistics Canada via Town of White City

Emerald Park had a population of 1,553 in the 2021 Census of Population, a 8.9% change from its 2006 census population of 1,426.

== Education ==
There are three schools serving Emerald Park families:

- École White City School – a French immersion school, kindergarten through grade 8;
- Emerald Ridge Elementary School – kindergarten through grade 8; and
- Greenall High School (Balgonie) – grades 9 through 12.

== Businesses ==
There are over 130 businesses located in and around Emerald Park, employing approximately 1,800 people.

Grocery stores, hardware stores, pharmacies, clothing and retail stores, and restaurants support the community's needs. Furthermore, industrial companies and specialty farm equipment retailers and manufacturers support innovation.

== Recreation and services ==
=== Recreation ===
In Emerald Park, residents have access to tennis courts, pickleball courts, soccer fields (and the new soccer centre facility on Great Plains Road), several pathways, trails and playground equipment, in addition to a privately run indoor skating rink (Communiskate).

The White Butte Trails (located north of Highway 1) are a unique natural asset to enjoy free hiking and cross-country skiing opportunities. Portions of the Trans Canada Trail run throughout the RM of Edenwold No. 158.

The Southeast Regional Library has three library branches in the area offering weekly programming options – including story times for parents and children.

Neighbouring communities have curling rinks, senior centres, an outdoor swimming pool, golf courses, baseball diamond, splash parks, skate parks, rodeo arenas, and community halls.

Annual recreation grants are given to towns and the village within the RM of Edenwold No. 158.

A variety of churches operate in the area, including:

- Balgonie Baptist Church, Balgonie United Church, and St. Joseph's Catholic Church in the Town of Balgonie;.
- Ambassadors for Christ Church in the Town of White City;
- Way of Life Church and St. Agnes Roman Catholic Church in the Town of Pilot Butte; and
- St. Paul's Lutheran Church in the Village of Edenwold.

=== Services ===
Water and sewer service is provided by the RM of Edenwold No. 158. Garbage and recycling pick up is coordinated for Emerald Park residents through private contractors. Fire protection agreements are in place between the RM of Edenwold No. 158 and the towns of Balgonie, White City, and Pilot Butte, the Village of Edenwold, and the Hamlet of Kronau. A secondary service provider agreement is in place with the City of Regina.

== Media ==
In addition to local municipal newsletters, the Quad Town Forum is a weekly newspaper that serves the RM, White City, Pilot Butte, Balgonie, and the surrounding areas.
