= Don McMorris =

Canadian politician

Member of the Saskatchewan Legislative Assembly for Indian Head-Milestone
- In office August 16, 1999 – October 1, 2024
- Preceded by: Lorne Scott
- Succeeded by: Brad Crassweller

Personal details
- Born: July 12, 1961 (age 64) Lewvan, Saskatchewan
- Party: Saskatchewan Party (1999-2016; 2017-present)
- Other political affiliations: Independent (2016-2017)

Don McMorris (born July 12, 1961) is a Canadian provincial politician, in the province of Saskatchewan. He was the Saskatchewan Party member of the Legislative Assembly of Saskatchewan for the constituency of Indian Head-Milestone from the 1999 provincial election, when he was elected as a member of the Saskatchewan Party, until 2024 when he did not stand for re-election. A former Minister of Health, he was the Deputy Premier and Minister of Crown Investments in the Saskatchewan provincial government of Brad Wall.

On August 6, 2016, he resigned from the Saskatchewan Party caucus and from Executive Council, where he was the Deputy Premier and minister responsible for Saskatchewan Government Insurance and the Saskatchewan Liquor and Gaming Authority, after being charged with impaired driving the previous day. He later pleaded guilty. On May 13, speaking about the launch of an impaired-driving awareness campaign, he spoke about Saskatchewan's high injury and fatality rates in regard to drinking and driving incidents. He was re-appointed to cabinet on November 9, 2020 as Minister of Government Relations.

McMorris is a graduate of Milestone High School and the father of professional snowboarders Mark McMorris and Craig McMorris.
