= Rural Municipality of South Qu'Appelle No. 157 =

Rural municipality in Saskatchewan, Canada

South Qu'Appelle No. 157
- Rural municipality
- Rural Municipality of South Qu'Appelle No. 157
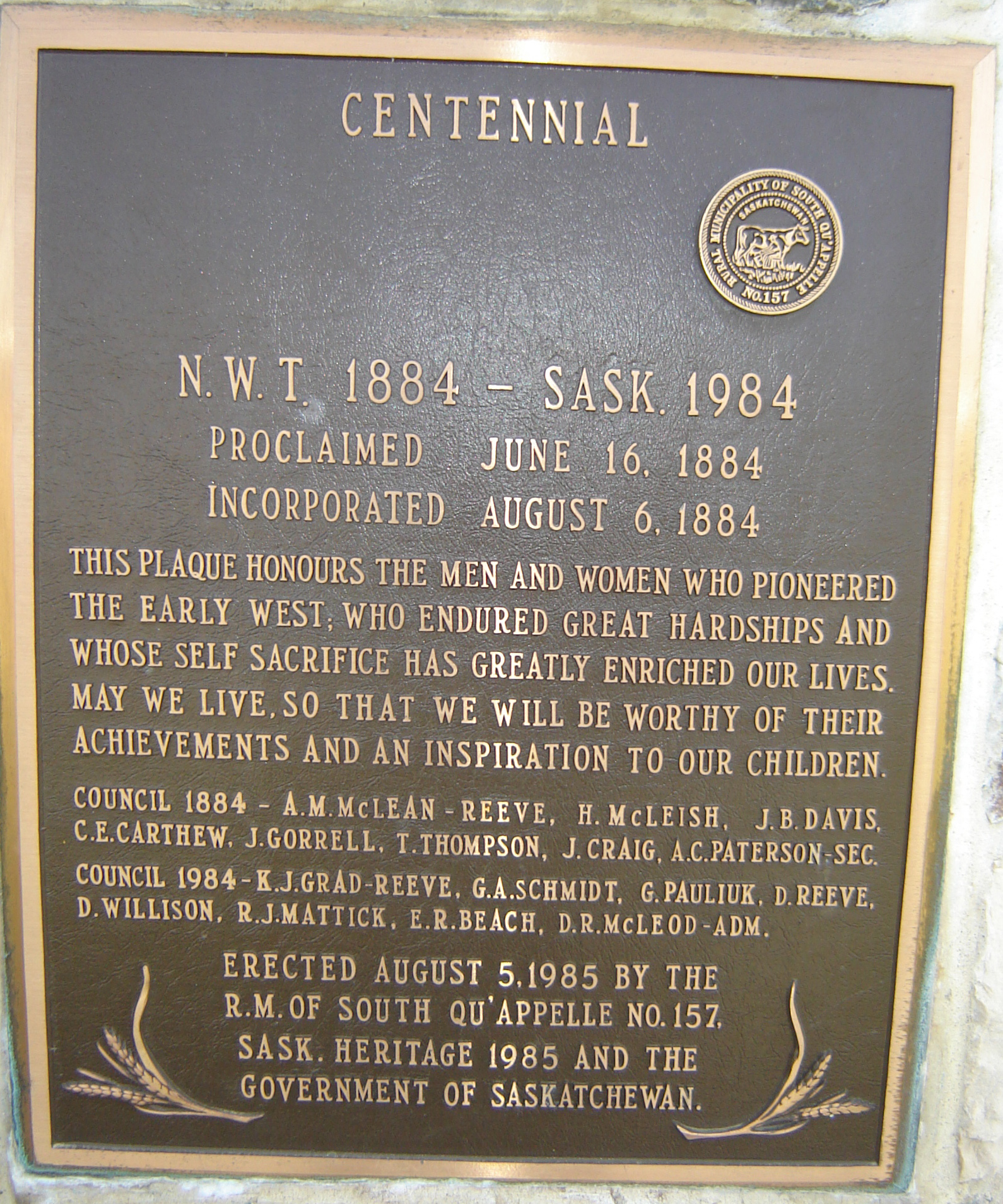
- RM's centennial plaque

- Location of the RM of South Qu'Appelle No. 157 in Saskatchewan
- Coordinates: 50.538°N 103.997°W
- Country: Canada
- Province: Saskatchewan
- Census division: 6
- SARM division: 1
- Formed: August 6, 1884

Government
  - Reeve: Jeannie DesRochers
  - Governing body: RM of South Qu'Appelle No. 157 Council
  - Administrator: Heidi Berlin
  - Office location: McLean

Area (2016)
  - Land: 889.72 km^{2} (343.52 sq mi)

Population (2016)
  - Total: 1,275
  - Density: 1.4/km^{2} (3.6/sq mi)
- Time zone: CST
  - Summer (DST): CST
- Area codes: 306 and 639

The Rural Municipality of South Qu'Appelle No. 157 (2016 population: 1,275) is a rural municipality (RM) in the Canadian province of Saskatchewan within Census Division No. 6 and SARM Division No. 1. It is located in the southeast portion of the province.

== History ==
The RM of South Qu'Appelle No. 157 incorporated as a rural municipality on August 6, 1884.

== Geography ==
The burrowing owl (athene cunicularia), an endangered animal, makes its home in this area.

=== Communities and localities ===
The following urban municipalities are surrounded by the RM.

Towns

- Qu'Appelle

Villages

- McLean

The following unincorporated communities are within the RM.

Organized hamlets

- Edgeley
- St. Joseph's

Localities

- Avonhurst

== Demographics ==
Population history (1981–2016)
Year	Pop.	±%
1981	1,182	—
1986	1,167	−1.3%
1991	1,128	−3.3%
1996	1,135	+0.6%
2001	1,098	−3.3%
2006	1,066	−2.9%
2011	1,271	+19.2%
2016	1,275	+0.3%
Source: Statistics Canada via Saskatchewan Bureau of Statistics

In the 2021 Census of Population conducted by Statistics Canada, the RM of South Qu'Appelle No. 157 had a population of 1,231 living in 475 of its 515 total private dwellings, a change of −3.5% from its 2016 population of 1,275. With a land area of 877.75 km^{2} (338.90 sq mi), it had a population density of 1.4/km^{2} (3.6/sq mi) in 2021.

In the 2016 Census of Population, the RM of South Qu'Appelle No. 157 recorded a population of 1,275 living in 489 of its 528 total private dwellings, a 0.3% change from its 2011 population of 1,271. With a land area of 889.72 km^{2} (343.52 sq mi), it had a population density of 1.4/km^{2} (3.7/sq mi) in 2016.

== Government ==
The RM of South Qu'Appelle No. 157 is governed by an elected municipal council and an appointed administrator that meets on the second Wednesday of every month. The reeve of the RM is Jeannie DesRochers while its administrator is Heidi Berlin. The RM's office is located in Qu'Appelle.

== See also ==
- List of rural municipalities in Saskatchewan
