= White Butte Trails Recreation Site =

Cross-country ski area in Saskatchewan, Canada

- Location within Saskatchewan Location within Canada
- Location: RM of Edenwold No. 158, Saskatchewan, Canada
- Nearest city: White City
- Coordinates: 50.4765°N 104.3676°W
- Owner: Saskatchewan Parks
- Trails: 10 groomed
- Longest run: Butte (3.6 km (2.2 mi))
- Total length: 12.7 km (7.9 mi)

White Butte Trails Recreation Site is a cross-country ski area in the RM of Edenwold No. 158 in the Canadian province of Saskatchewan. The name "White Butte" is an amalgamation of the nearby communities of White City and Pilot Butte. The park is about 4 kilometres (2.5 mi) north of White City and 20 minutes east of Regina in a region referred to as White Butte. The ski area consists of ten groomed trails with varying levels of difficulty. During the off season, when the snow melts, the area is transformed into a hiking and cycling area. The park is part of the Trans Canada Trail system and is under the jurisdiction of Saskatchewan's Ministry of Tourism, Parks, Culture and Sport.

Access is from Frank Lake Road, which runs south from Highway 48 to Highway 1.

== Description ==
There are nine groomed cross-country ski trails totalling 12.7 kilometres (7.9 mi) that are maintained by the Regina Ski Club. In addition, there's one 5-kilometre (3.1 mi) trail that is for winter walking and snowshoeing. The landscape is treed with native grasses and rolling hills.

Facilities include two parking lots, two warm-up shelters, and outdoor pit toilets.

=== Ski trails ===
Beginner trails

- Aspen (0.7 km)
- Marsh (1.6 km)
- Meadow (0.2 km)
- Rose (0.8 km)
- Sage (0.8 km)
- Willow (1.7 km)

Intermediate trails

- Butte (3.6 km)
- Cherry (1.3 km)
- Snowberry (2 km)

== History ==
White Butte Recreation Site was established in 1982 as a result of the lobbying of the provincial government by members of the Regina Ski Club, the Saskatchewan Natural History Society, and numerous other interested persons. The first trails — Cherry and Snowberry — were completed in 1983. In 2006, the trail system was designated as part of the Trans Canada Trail.

In 2014, a golf course was proposed for the park but due to public opposition, the development was 'quashed' in 2015. White Butte Trails Recreation Site is one of only three areas near Regina with native prairie grasslands.

== See also ==
- List of ski areas and resorts in Canada
- List of protected areas of Saskatchewan
- Tourism in Saskatchewan
