= White Butte, South Dakota =

Unincorporated community in South Dakota, U.S.

Coordinates: 45°56′26″N 102°21′45″W

White Butte is an unincorporated community in Perkins County, in the U.S. state of South Dakota. It is just north of the Grand River National Grassland.

== History ==
A post office called White Butte was established in 1909, and remained in operation until 1960. The community took its name from nearby White Butte.
