= Lorne Scott =

Canadian politician

Member of the Saskatchewan Legislative Assembly for Indian Head-Milestone
- In office October 21, 1991 – September 16, 1999
- Preceded by: Doug Taylor
- Succeeded by: Don McMorris

Personal details
- Born: Lorne Scott; May 19, 1947; Indian Head, Saskatchewan
- Political party: New Democratic Party
- Occupation: Conservationist

Reginald Lorne Scott, C.M. (2009) (b. May 19, 1947) is a Canadian environmentalist and former political figure in Saskatchewan, Canada. From 1991 to 1995 he represented the seat of Indian Head-Wolseley and from 1995 to 1999 he represented Indian Head-Milestone in the Legislative Assembly of Saskatchewan as a New Democratic Party (NDP) member.

== Biography ==
Lorne Scott was born in Indian Head, Saskatchewan, the son of Reginald and Gertie Scott. Scott worked for the Saskatchewan Museum of Natural History from 1967 to 1975 and for the Wascana Centre Authority, where he worked as a park naturalist from 1975 to 1991. He also operates a farm in the Indian Head area. Scott served as president of the Saskatchewan Wildlife Federation, the Saskatchewan Natural History Society and the Whooping Crane Conservation Association. He was a member of the provincial cabinet, serving as Minister of Saskatchewan Environment and Resource Management from November 22, 1995 until 1999. Scott was defeated by Don McMorris when he ran for reelection to the Saskatchewan assembly in 1999.

In 1999, he was named executive director of the Saskatchewan Wildlife Federation. He also served as Saskatchewan chair for the Nature Conservancy of Canada. In 2008, he was named to the Order of Canada.

== Electoral results ==
1999 Saskatchewan general election: Indian Head-Milestone
Party	Candidate	Votes	%	±%
Saskatchewan	Don McMorris	3,877	48.09	–
NDP	Lorne Scott	2,305	28.59	-14.86
Liberal	Larry Schultz	1,693	21.00	-17.92
New Green	Garth Herman	187	2.32	–
Total		8,062	100.00	

1995 Saskatchewan general election: Indian Head-Milestone
Party	Candidate	Votes	%	±%
NDP	Lorne Scott	3,440	43.45	–
Liberal	Steve Helfrick	3,081	38.92	–
Prog. Conservative	Dale Paslawski	1,396	17.63	–
Total		7,917	100.00	

1991 Saskatchewan general election: Indian Head-Wolseley
Party	Candidate	Votes	%	±%
NDP	Lorne Scott	2,725	39.72%	+13.63
Liberal	Jack Hosler	2,069	30.16%	+14.07
Prog. Conservative	Dwight Dunn	2,066	30.12%	-27.70
Total		6,860	100.00%	
