= Pilot Butte storm of 1995 =

Weather event in Saskatchewan, Canada

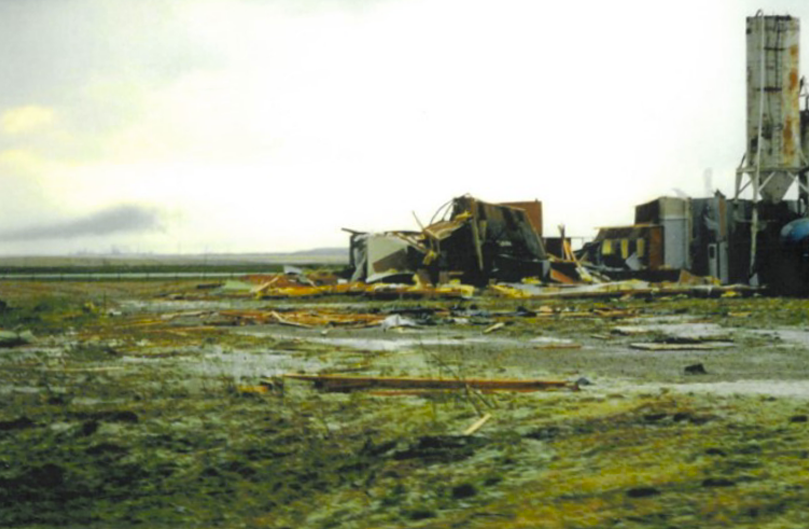
- Remnants of the old cement plant following the storm.

Meteorological history
- Formed: August 26, 1995 4:40 pm (CST)

EF2 tornado
- on the Enhanced Fujita scale
- Highest winds: Over 160 km/h (99 mph)
- Highest gusts: 205 km/h (127 mph)
- Lowest temp: 20 °C (68 °F)
- Max. rainfall: 25 cm (9.8 in)

Overall effects
- Casualties: 9 minor injuries, 2 major injuries
- Damage: up to $30 million Buildings demolished. Flooding. Significant property damage.
- Areas affected: Southern Saskatchewan, notably Pilot Butte
- Power outages: Over 400 homes

The Pilot Butte storm of 1995 was a powerful storm and tornado that devastated Pilot Butte, Saskatchewan on August 26, 1995. At about 4:40 p.m., a major wind and hailstorm started in the town. The storm later spawned a tornado, which touched down at the west edge of the town limits, demolishing a farmyard and cement plant.

== Occurrence ==
The tornado hit Pilot Butte at approximately 4:40 p.m. on August 26, 1995. A baseball tournament was being held at the same time as the storm hit. The hailstorm came in first, which produced golf ball sized hail. Later, a tornado formed on the west edge of the town limits. The south and west ends of the town were affected heavily; however, every property in the town had some damage done to it. Over 500 homes in the community were left without power, resulting in Sask Power crews having to come to restore power.

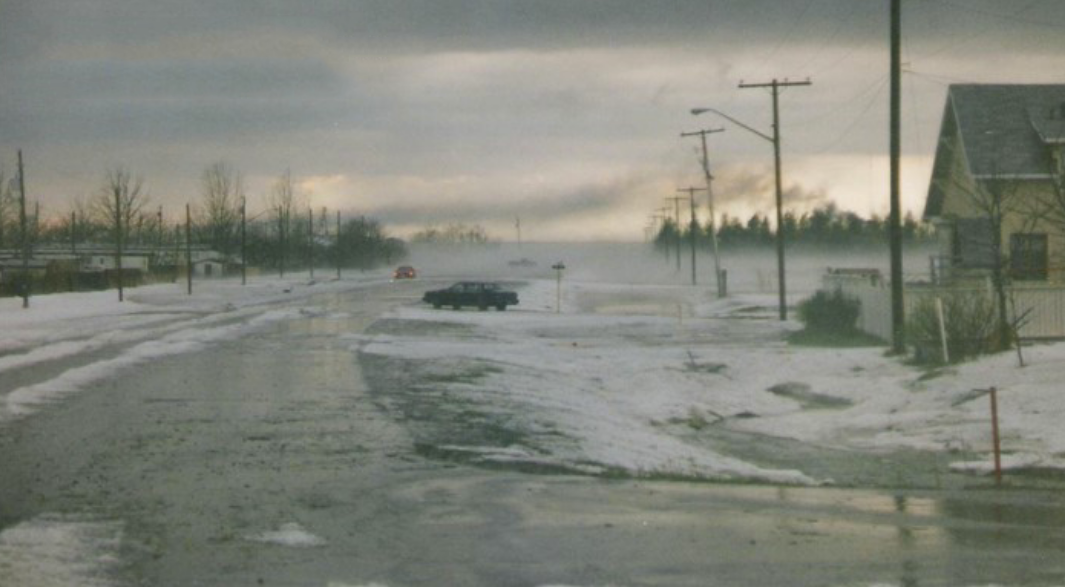
Ruins of 1st Avenue—including hail, flooding, and property damage—following the storm

=== State of emergency ===
At 5:45 p.m., a state of local emergency was declared for Pilot Butte and its surrounding area. On site emergency responders came from Pilot Butte and Regina, some of which included the Regina Emergency Communications Team, the Saskatchewan Emergency Measures Organization and the local R.C.M.P. Portable water, shelter, food and emergency building materials were provided by the Red Cross and by Provincial Social Services for those who needed it. The rink became a temporary hospital.

=== Aftermath ===
Tattered siding and shingles on houses, broken windows in buildings, and dented cars were all common in Pilot Butte. The Betteridge farmstead, next to the town, was reduced to a pile of rubble. Yet the most heartfelt loss in some ways involved the more than 2400 trees that were marred and subjected to removal. Flooding became a major result of the storm, parts of the town and Regina were flooded with 25 cm of rain within 1 hour of the storm. Golfball and larger hail left drifts 50 cm deep in several places around the town. The worst damage from the storm was in the west and south ends of the town, where a farmyard and cement plant were demolished, along with many homes and all of the trailer park, the 72-unit trailer park was in total ruin. Almost all trees in the town were damaged and uprooted, resulting in very messy streets full of broken trees and branches. After one month, the town was back to normal and rebuilding started up, about a decade later, the cement plant was fully rebuilt.

== Legacy ==
In August 2020, residents of the town observed a 25-year-anniversary of the event.

=== Junior hockey team ===
In 2001, Pilot Butte's junior hockey team was renamed from the Express to the Storm to remember the Pilot Butte Storm of 1995. Since then, the Storm won the division title in 2008, 2010, 2013, 2014 and 2015. The Storm won the Athol Murray Trophy in 2007, 2008, 2011 and 2012 to earn the right to represent the Saskatchewan Hockey Association at the Keystone Cup. In 2011 the Storm had their best result in team history finishing as Keystone Cup Bronze medalist.
