= Crawford Estates =

Canadian settlement in Saskatchewan with representation at its Edenwold municipality

Crawford Estates is an organized hamlet in the rural municipality of Edenwold No. 158 in Saskatchewan. It was established as an organized hamlet on 1 January 2002. It has a population of 60 people according to the 2006 Canada Census, and had a population of 50 in 2001.
