= Avonhurst =

Coordinates: 50.374°N 104.075°W

Location of Avonhurst in Saskatchewan

Avonhurst is an unincorporated community in Saskatchewan located on the Canadian National Railway line northeast of Regina flourishing in the 1950s. It had grain elevators, a general store and a fuel service operated by Clayton Davis. The community diminished as farms became larger and people moved to major centres.
