= Brad Crassweller =

Canadian politician

Brad Crassweller (born 1969) is a Canadian politician who was elected to the Legislative Assembly of Saskatchewan in the 2024 general election, representing White City-Qu'appelle as a member of the Saskatchewan Party.

Prior to his election, he served on the council of the Rural Municipality of Sherwood No. 159. He is also a former pastor and owner of a landscaping company. He and his family currently own and operate Cedar Creek Gardens, a seasonal greenhouse turned year-round family fun destination center.
