= White City, Saskatchewan =

Town in Saskatchewan, Canada

White City
- Town
- Town of White City
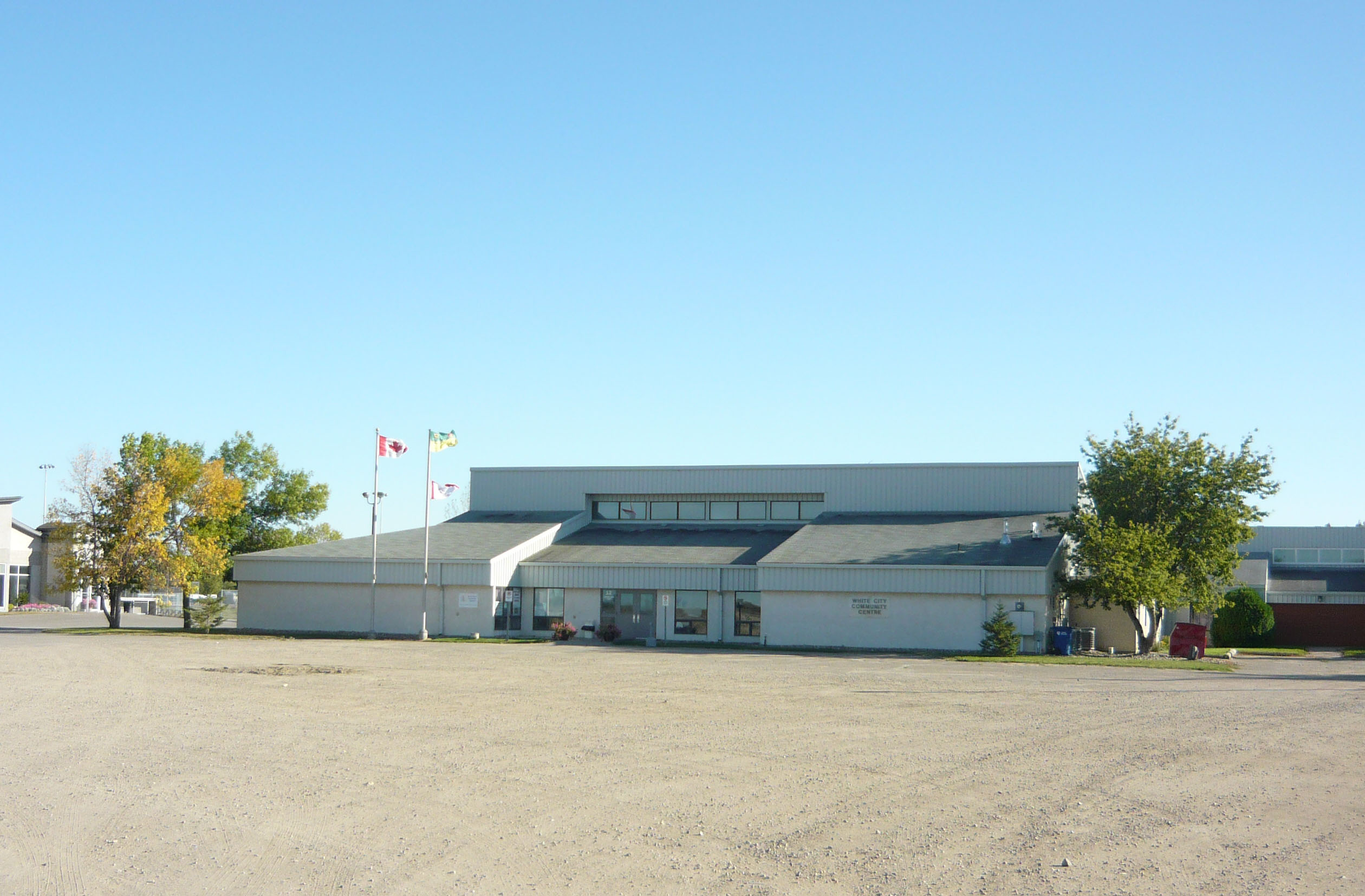
- White City Community Centre
- Motto: Your Way of Life
- Town of White City in Saskatchewan White City (Canada)
- Coordinates: 50°26′07″N 104°21′26″W
- Country: Canada
- Province: Saskatchewan
- Rural municipality (RM): Edenwold No. 158
- Provincial Constituency: White City-Qu'appelle
- Federal Electoral District: Regina—Qu'Appelle
- Founded: 1950s
- Organized hamlet: April 26, 1959
- Village: March 1, 1967
- Town: November 1, 2000

Government
  - Mayor: Mitchell Simpson
  - Governing body: White City Town Council
  - MLA: Brad Crassweller, (SKP)
  - MP: Andrew Scheer, (CON)

Area
  - Land: 7.56 km^{2} (2.92 sq mi)

Population (2021)
  - Total: 3,821
  - Density: 505/km^{2} (1,310/sq mi)
- Time zone: UTC-6 (CST)
- Forward sortation area: S4L
- Area code: +1-306

White City is a town in southeast Saskatchewan. Situated at the intersection of Highway 48 and the Trans-Canada Highway, the town is part of the White Butte region and neighbours Balgonie, Pilot Butte, and the province's capital city, Regina. White City is primarily populated by people who commute to work in Regina. Its motto is "Your Way of Life".

== History ==
White City began on 80 acres (32 ha) owned by Pilot Butte resident Johnston Lipsett. The community organized as a hamlet on April 26, 1959. It incorporated as a village on March 1, 1967 and then as a town on November 1, 2000. The community was named after White City, London, England when John Kadannek, a local store owner, persuaded Lipsett to name it for the home of his favourite aunt.

== Demographics ==
Population history (1961–2021)
Year	Pop.	±%
1961	91	—
1966	93	+2.2%
1971	129	+38.7%
1976	340	+163.6%
1981	602	+77.1%
1986	783	+30.1%
1991	862	+10.1%
1996	905	+5.0%
2001	1,013	+11.9%
2006	1,113	+9.9%
2011	1,894	+70.2%
2016	3,099	+63.6%
2021	3,821	+23.3%
Source: Statistics Canada via Town of White City

In the 2021 Census of Population conducted by Statistics Canada, White City was originally reported as having a population of 3,702 living in 1,176 of its 1,200 total private dwellings, a change of 19.5% from its 2016 population of 3,099. With a land area of 7.56 km^{2} (2.92 sq mi), it had a population density of 489.7/km^{2} (1,268.3/sq mi) in 2021. Statistics Canada subsequently amended White City's 2021 census results to a population of 3,821 living in 1,211 of its 1,235 total private dwellings, an adjusted change of 23.3% from its 2016 population.

In the 2016 Census of Population conducted by Statistics Canada, the Town of White City recorded a population of 3,099 living in 998 of its 1,036 total private dwellings, a 63.2% change from its 2011 adjusted population of 1,899. With a land area of 7.52 km^{2} (2.90 sq mi), it had a population density of 412.1/km^{2} (1,067.3/sq mi) in 2016.

== Services ==
White City is serviced with a library and a Canada Post office.

== Education ==
École White City School and Emerald Ridge Elementary School provide education for kindergarten through grade 8. Students in grades 9 through 12 are bused 10 minutes northeast to Greenall School in Balgonie.

== See also ==
- List of towns in Saskatchewan
