= White Butte (Perkins County, South Dakota) =

Summit in South Dakota, United States

Coordinates: 45°50′59″N 102°23′58″W

White Butte is a summit in South Dakota, in the United States. With an elevation of 2,913 feet (888 m), White Butte is the 364th highest summit in the state of South Dakota.

The name stems from the butte's white color.
