= Edgeley, Saskatchewan =

Hamlet in Saskatchewan, Canada

Coordinates: 50°38′18″N 103°59′46″W

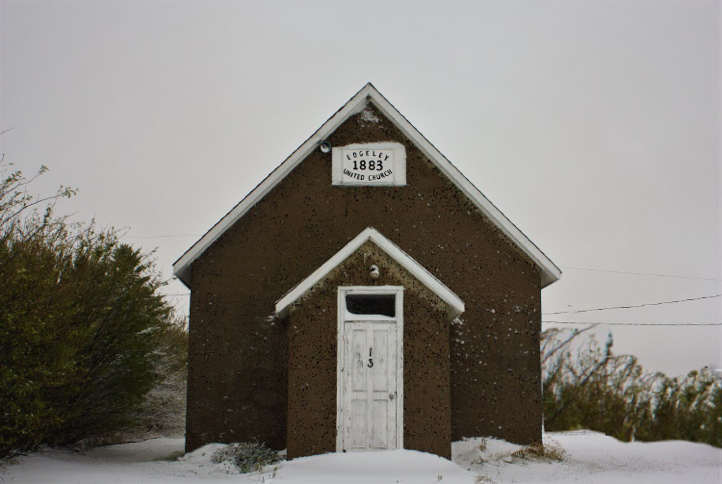
Edgeley United Church

Edgeley is a hamlet in the Canadian province of Saskatchewan and formerly (until the rationalisation of operations by the major Canadian grain-buying companies) the location of some half-dozen grain elevators.

At the outset of settlement of this part of the Canadian prairies, Edgeley was a centre of the Methodist Church of Canada's Qu'Appelle-Edgeley Circuit which later, in 1925, was absorbed into the United Church of Canada.

Once reached by road west of Highway 35 in the once densely populated Qu'Appelle-Fort Qu'Appelle hinterland as well as by rail, its significance has lapsed since the opening of Highway 10 from Balgonie to Fort Qu'Appelle and beyond to PTH 5 at the Manitoba border in the early 1960s, as it has been immediately adjacent to a major throughway.

== Demographics ==
In the 2021 Census of Population conducted by Statistics Canada, Edgeley had a population of 41 living in 21 of its 21 total private dwellings, a change of -8.9% from its 2016 population of 45. With a land area of 0.16 km^{2} (0.062 sq mi), it had a population density of 256.3/km^{2} (663.7/sq mi) in 2021.
