= Pilot Butte, Saskatchewan =

Town in Saskatchewan, Canada

Pilot Butte Otasawâpiwin (Cree)
- Town
- Town of Pilot Butte
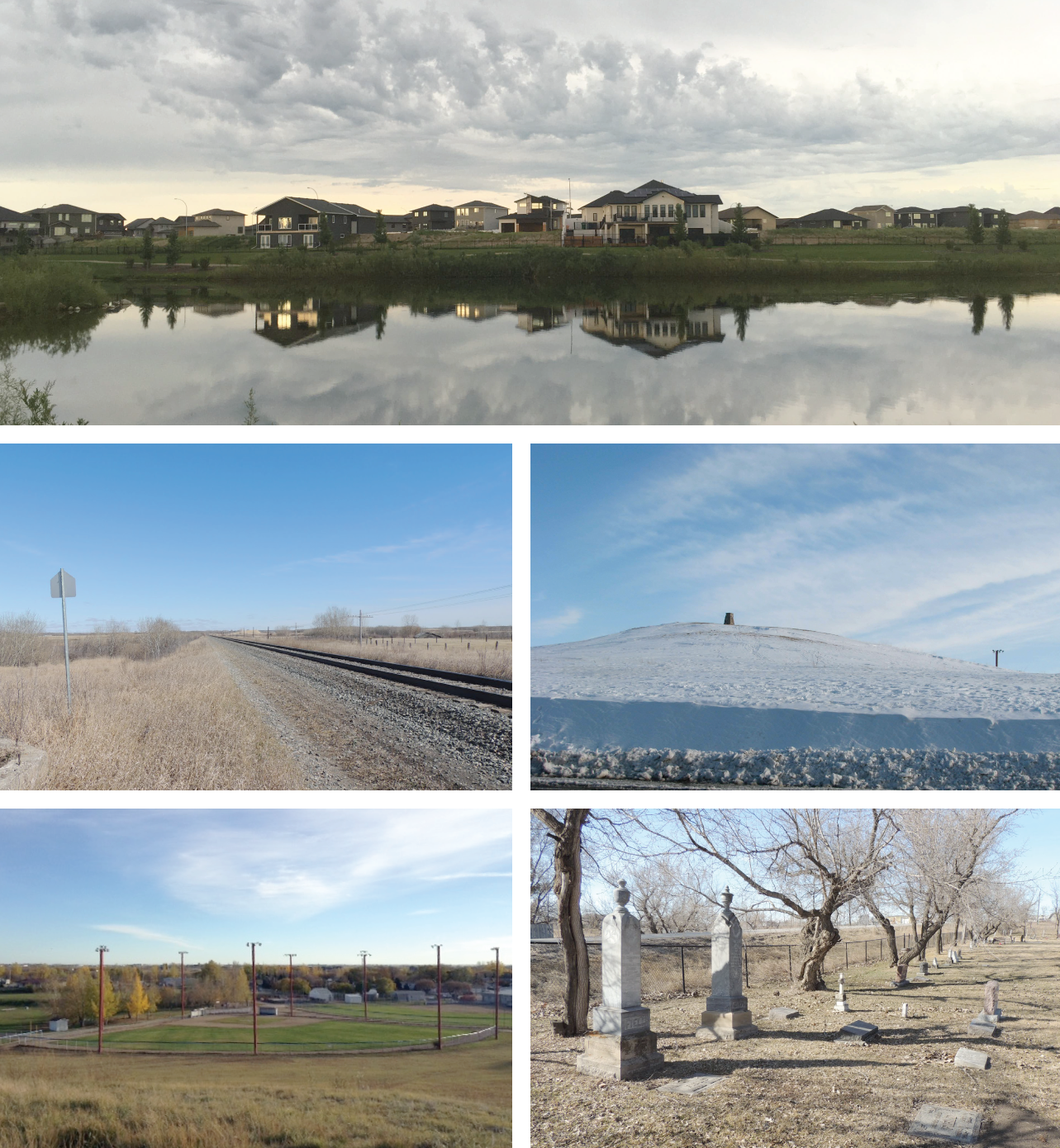
- From top to bottom; left to right: houses in Discovery Ridge, the CPR Mainline, the Butte Hill, a baseball diamond in Inland Park, and graves at St. George's Cemetery.

- Flag
- Nicknames: "The Sand Capital of Canada"
- Motto: "The Town That Cares"
- Location within Saskatchewan Location within Canada
- Coordinates: 50°28′37″N 104°25′02″W
- Country: Canada
- Province: Saskatchewan
- Treaty: Treaty 4
- Census division: Division No. 6
- Settled: 1882
- Incorp. (village): 1913
- Dissolved: 1923
- Incorp. (village): 1963
- Incorp. (town): 1979
- Named for: The hill which the town surrounds, the Butte Hill

Government
  - Mayor: Peggy Chorney
  - MP: Andrew Scheer (CPC)
  - MLA: Don McMorris (SKP)

Area
  - Land: 5.71 km^{2} (2.20 sq mi)
  - Population centre: 2.75 km^{2} (1.06 sq mi)
- Elevation: 610 m (2,000 ft)

Population (2021)
  - Total: 2,638 (23rd)
  - Density: 462.3/km^{2} (1,197/sq mi)
  - Population centre: 2,364
  - Population centre density: 858.7/km^{2} (2,224/sq mi)
- Time zone: UTC−06:00 (CST)
- Postal code: S0G 3Z0
- Area codes: 306 and 639
- Highways: 46, 362, 624
- Railways: Canadian Pacific
- Website: Official website

Pilot Butte (/paɪlɪt ˈbjuːt/; Cree: Otasawâpiwin [oʊtʌsaʊɑpuwɪn]), meaning "lookout point", is a town in southeast Saskatchewan. Situated between Highway 46 and the Trans-Canada Highway, the town is part of the White Butte region and neighbours Balgonie, White City, and the province's capital city, Regina. As of the 2021 Canadian census, Pilot Butte had a population of 2,638, indicating 23% growth from 2016. The town is governed by the Pilot Butte Town Council and is surrounded by the Rural Municipality of Edenwold No. 158. Pilot Butte is located in Treaty 4 territory.

Prior to European arrival, local Indigenous peoples camped near Boggy Creek and used the butte as a lookout point. European settlement began in the area in the 1840s, and Pilot Butte was established in 1882. Pilot Butte's early development was more substantial than neighbouring settlements thanks to its brick plants, sand and gravel deposits, and location on the Canadian Pacific Railway mainline. The community incorporated as a village in the early 20th century; however, following World War I, most of its residents and buildings, including a hotel, train station, and water tower, were dismantled or destroyed.

The completion of the Trans-Canada Highway in the 1950s brought people back out to Pilot Butte. It reincorporated as a village and then gained town status in 1979. A year later, the name "Sand Capital of Canada" was chosen in a town slogan contest, and in 1982, Pilot Butte celebrated its 100th anniversary and a monument was erected atop Butte Hill. In 1995, the Pilot Butte Storm damaged most of the buildings and nearly every tree town.

Since the storm, the town has continued to grow. Pilot Butte hosted the Western Canadian Softball Championships in 2002 and an annual rodeo has attracted visitors to the town every summer since 1993. The 2010s saw the beginning of new housing and commercial developments in town, as well as various infrastructure updates, which have continued to attract new residents. Between 2016 and 2021, Pilot Butte was the fastest growing population centre in Saskatchewan.

== History ==
=== Settlement, early heyday and decline ===
The area that is now Pilot Butte contains over 20 known archaeological sites, indicating pre-contact Indigenous presence in the immediate area. The butte played a significant role in the lives of the local Indigenous peoples, who camped near Boggy Creek and used the butte as a lookout and signal point; the Cree call the hill Otasawâpiwin, meaning "his lookout." Indigenous peoples of the present-day Pilot Butte area include the Assiniboine (Nakoda) and Cree (Nehiyawak) people; the area is also the homeland of the Métis. Beginning in 1874 at Fort Qu'Appelle, Treaty 4 was signed between the Queen Victoria and various First Nation band governments, with its coverage spanning the Pilot Butte area.

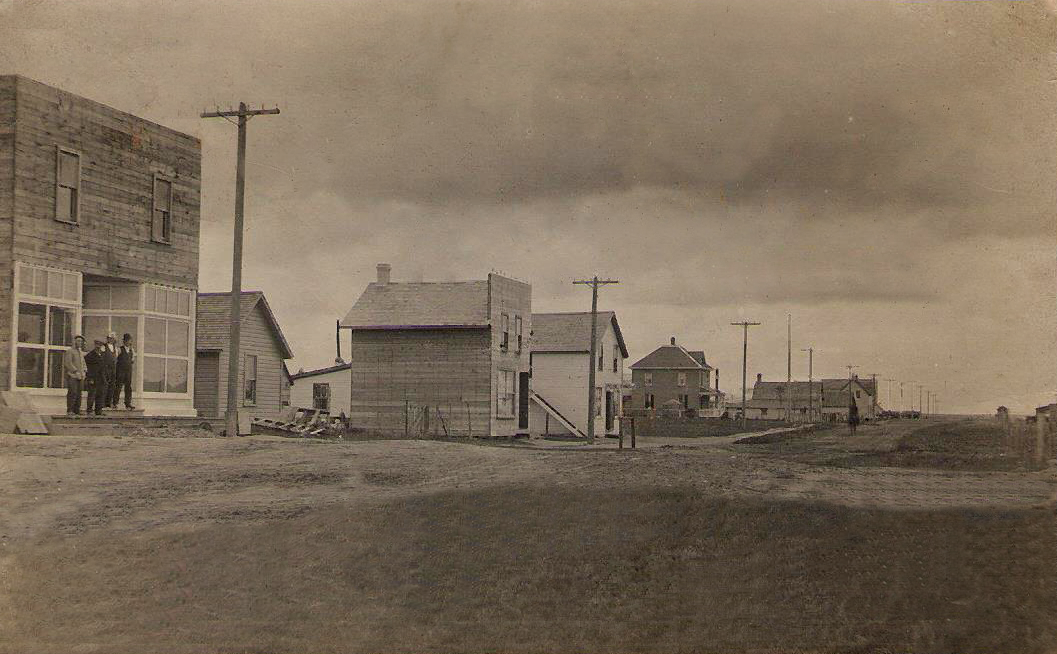
North side of Railway Avenue, 1913

European settlement in the area can be traced back to the 1840s, with the Dominion Lands Act of 1872 encouraging homesteaders to come to the area where they could purchase 0.65 km^{2} (160 acres) of land for $10. By 1882, the Canadian Pacific Railway had made its way through the District of Assiniboia; between Pilot Butte and Regina a crew set a company record for the most track laid in a single day.

With the construction of the railway through the region, the community was established and the area's sand and gravel deposits were extensively utilized. In the following years, as settlers began farming in the district, Pilot Butte developed, with the name being chosen in 1883 to mean "lookout point". The origin of the name is derived from the flat-topped hill located in the community that served as a lookout for hunting buffalo. Speakers of Cree called the hill and the community Otasawâpiwin (ᐅᑕᓴᐚᐱᐏᐣ), meaning "his lookout." Early homes in the community were built on the south side of the track using bricks from the local red brick plant, which began production in 1890. In 1891, Pilot Butte School District No. 207 was established; the school was located south of the community.

Because of Pilot Butte's location on the Canadian Pacific Railway mainline, significant settlement took place between 1880 and 1900, and a second brick plant began production in 1900. The community's sand and gravel deposits were used during the construction of the railway and for the local brick plants. British and German immigration to Pilot Butte was common throughout its early decades, while Romanian and Ukrainian immigration would begin in 1902.

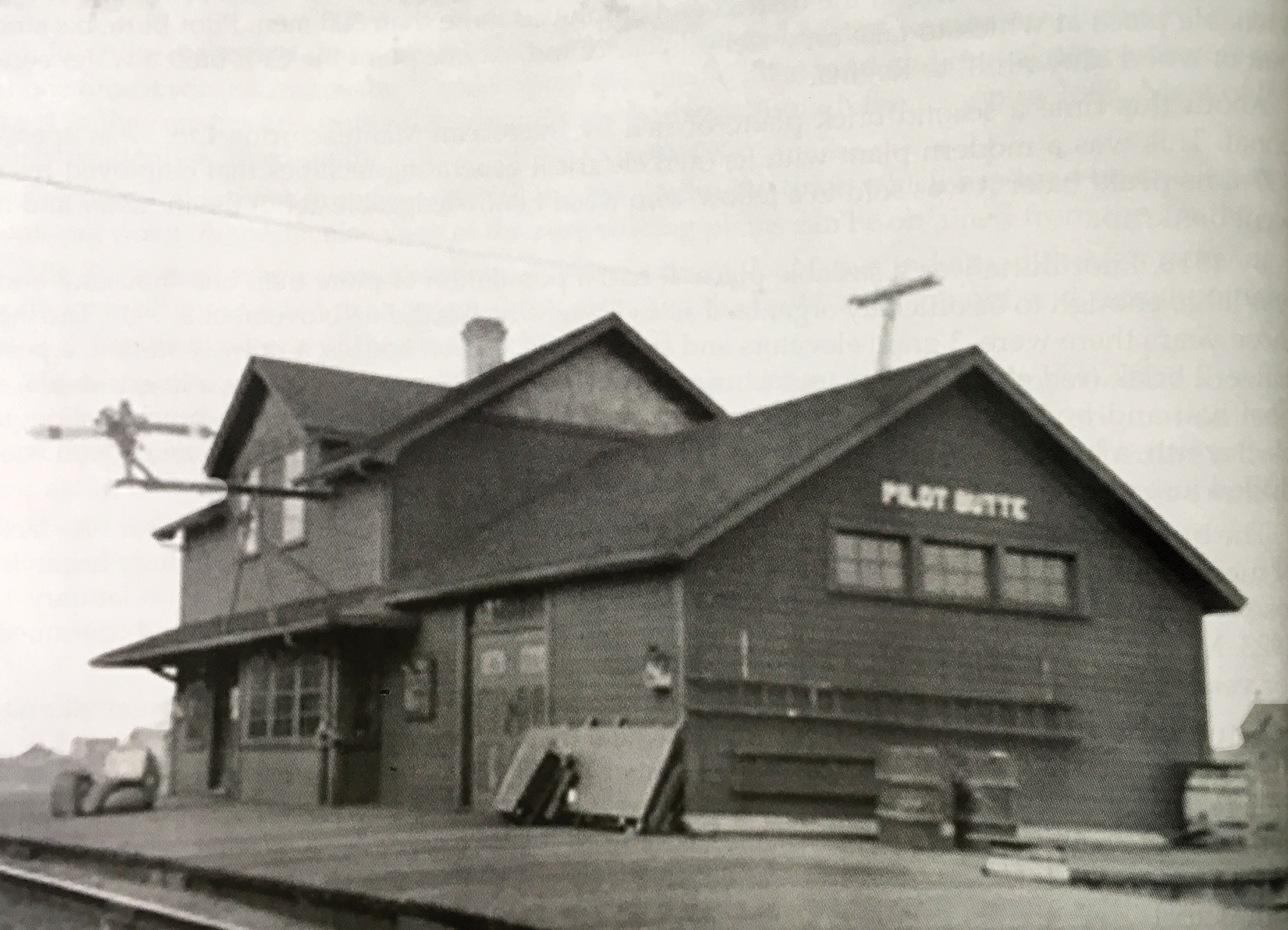
Pilot Butte's CPR station, 1915

The settlement had grown greatly since its founding; a post office opened in October 1903, and in 1913 Pilot Butte was incorporated as a village. At one point, the village offered the Canadian Pacific Railway a reliable year round water source so a water conduit was built to Regina. During its peak, the village boasted a railway station, three grain elevators, a stockyard, the Kitchener Hotel, boarding houses, a pool hall, bowling alley, general store, butcher and blacksmith shops, two churches, and two section houses. In 1913, a two-storey, red brick school was built in town, which also served as a community centre.

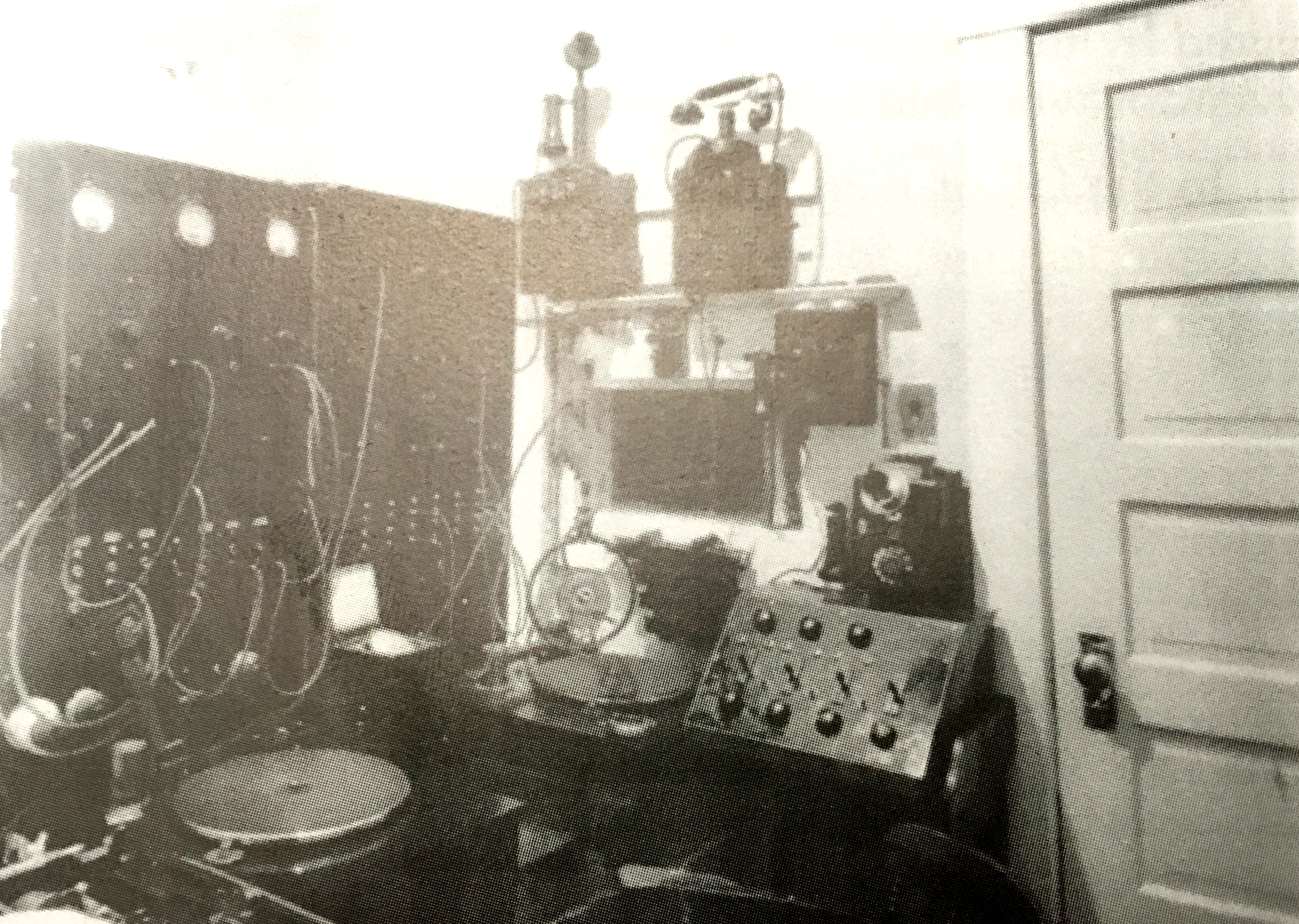
CHWC control room in the Kitchener Hotel, unknown year

The community's brickyards were major local employers (employing over 800 people at one point); however, they closed during World War I. During the war in 1915, there were unsuccessfully attempts to drill for oil. With automobiles allowing for easy transport to Regina, Pilot Butte began to lose its population—a trend that would continue for years. In 1923, the village was dissolved because of the loss in population. During the Great Depression and leading up to World War II, Pilot Butte had lost most of the residents and services that it once had. In 1926, the CHWC radio station began broadcasting from the Kitchener Hotel, but the broadcasting ended in 1936 when the hotel eventually closed.

Today, the old Pilot Butte schoolhouse is located to the north of the town on private property, and the Arrat schoolhouse is located directly south of St. George's cemetery. Except for the schoolhouses and the Marin House, a house on Railway Avenue built of brick from the red brick plant, there are few physical reminders of the town's early development; most original structures, such as the hotel, train station, and water tower, have all been dismantled or destroyed.

=== Post-war regrowth and recent history ===
In 1946, the Pilot Butte Memorial Hall was opened; Premier Tommy Douglas was in attendance and spoke at the ceremony. The Trans-Canada Highway was completed through Saskatchewan in 1957; similarly to the building of the railway, the new highway attracted new residents to move to Pilot Butte, as the village became a popular option for those wanting to live in a town but commute to the city. Because of the growing population, the brick school was replaced by a larger, stucco school in 1958. In 1963 the town re-acquired village status, and in the following years, the town saw infrastructure updates and a continued population growth. In 1964, street lights were installed in the village; in 1968, the village saw the introduction of street signs and its first zoning bylaw; and in 1976, construction began on the Pilot Butte rink and recreation complex. Towards the end of the decade, the water tower was destroyed and construction began on a village office on Railway Avenue.

By 1979, the community acquired town status. A year later, the name "Sand Capital of Canada" was chosen in a town slogan contest, and in 1981, the Royal Canadian Mounted Police began providing police services to the town. In 1982, Pilot Butte celebrated its 100th anniversary and a monument was erected atop Butte Hill. The same year, construction began on a new fire hall on Railway Avenue, and Highway 46 was paved in 1984. In 1985, a library was opened in town, and in 1988, Pilot Butte School received a large expansion and renovation which included more classrooms, a science lab, home economics lab, stage, art room, and gymnasium. This same year, Ed Zsombor was elected mayor and would continue to hold this office until 2009. 1993 marked the first annual Pilot Butte Rodeo.

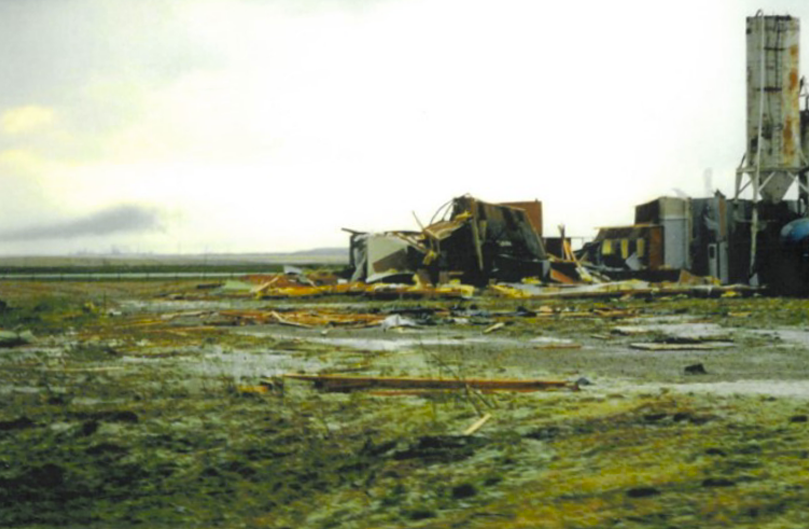
Damage at the cement plant after the Pilot Butte Storm, 1995

A violent storm known as the Pilot Butte storm of 1995 hit the area on 26 August 1995, damaging most homes in the community. In the following years, trees were replanted throughout town and homes were repaired. In 2001, the Regina Express junior hockey team, who play in the Prairie Junior Hockey League, were relocated to Pilot Butte. The team was renamed to the Pilot Butte Storm in 2003 to remember the 1995 storm, and since then the storm have won the league title four times, also winning bronze at the Keystone Cup in 2011.

In 2002, Pilot Butte hosted the Western Canadian Softball Championships, and in 2007, the town celebrated its 125th anniversary with a slow-pitch tournament, powwow, the introduction of a town flag, and the writing of a town history book. The 2010s saw the beginning of new housing and commercial developments in town. Construction was completed on a new water treatment and sewer disposal facility in 2014, which saw the town win legal dispute with residents who protested the project. Pilot Butte received federal and provincial funding for wastewater treatment upgrades in 2017. In 2018, a diverging diamond interchange opened on the Pilot Butte access road as part of the Regina Bypass project, only the second of its kind in Canada.

From 2016 to 2021, Pilot Butte was the fastest growing population centre in Saskatchewan, recording a 23.4% increase in population at the 2021 census.

== Geography ==
The town is situated on a broad, flat, treeless and largely waterless plain. The Butte Hill, the hill which the town is named after, is the highest point in the area. Like in Regina, all of the town's trees, shrubs, and other plants were hand-planted, and because of the Pilot Butte storm, which destroyed most trees in the town, many have been re-planted since 1995.

=== Climate ===
Pilot Butte experiences a dry humid continental climate (Köppen: Dfb) in the NRC Plant Hardiness Zone 3b. Pilot Butte has warm summers and cold, dry winters, prone to extremes at all times of the year. Precipitation is heaviest from June through August in the form of rain, while snow is common in the winter. An average summer day has a high of 24.5 °C (76.1 °F), although temperatures can reach as high as 40.0 °C (104.0 °F), while the average winter day has a low of −20.2 °C (−4.4 °F), with temperatures reaching below −45.0 °C (−49.0 °F).

Climate data for Zehner (9 km (5.6 mi) north of Pilot Butte) Climate ID: 4019200; coordinates 50°38′N 104°24′W; elevation: 682.8 m (2,240 ft); 1981–2010 normals
Month	Jan	Feb	Mar	Apr	May	Jun	Jul	Aug	Sep	Oct	Nov	Dec	Year
Record high °C (°F)	7.0 (44.6)	9.0 (48.2)	20.0 (68.0)	29.0 (84.2)	33.5 (92.3)	39.0 (102.2)	37.5 (99.5)	37.5 (99.5)	34.5 (94.1)	29.0 (84.2)	18.0 (64.4)	10.5 (50.9)	39.0 (102.2)
Mean daily maximum °C (°F)	−10.4 (13.3)	−7.1 (19.2)	0.7 (33.3)	10.3 (50.5)	17.7 (63.9)	22.0 (71.6)	24.4 (75.9)	24.5 (76.1)	17.6 (63.7)	9.9 (49.8)	−2 (28)	−8.8 (16.2)	8.1 (46.6)
Daily mean °C (°F)	−15.3 (4.5)	−11.8 (10.8)	−5.2 (22.6)	4.2 (39.6)	11.3 (52.3)	16.0 (60.8)	18.1 (64.6)	17.9 (64.2)	11.5 (52.7)	4.4 (39.9)	−6.2 (20.8)	−13.3 (8.1)	2.6 (36.7)
Mean daily minimum °C (°F)	−20.2 (−4.4)	−16.4 (2.5)	−9.7 (14.5)	−1.8 (28.8)	4.8 (40.6)	9.9 (49.8)	11.8 (53.2)	11.2 (52.2)	5.4 (41.7)	−1.2 (29.8)	−10.3 (13.5)	−17.9 (−0.2)	−2.9 (26.8)
Record low °C (°F)	−38.5 (−37.3)	−41.5 (−42.7)	−33.5 (−28.3)	−20 (−4)	−8 (18)	−1 (30)	4.0 (39.2)	−0.5 (31.1)	−6 (21)	−23 (−9)	−34.5 (−30.1)	−43 (−45)	−43 (−45)
Average precipitation mm (inches)	21.7 (0.85)	15.4 (0.61)	26.4 (1.04)	23.6 (0.93)	52.2 (2.06)	81.6 (3.21)	80.5 (3.17)	53.7 (2.11)	45.9 (1.81)	32.5 (1.28)	19.2 (0.76)	23.5 (0.93)	476 (18.7)
Average rainfall mm (inches)	0.1 (0.00)	0.2 (0.01)	2.8 (0.11)	16.4 (0.65)	48.2 (1.90)	81.3 (3.20)	80.5 (3.17)	53.7 (2.11)	42.8 (1.69)	22.5 (0.89)	1.9 (0.07)	0.0 (0.0)	350.4 (13.80)
Average snowfall cm (inches)	21.6 (8.5)	15.1 (5.9)	23.6 (9.3)	7.2 (2.8)	4.0 (1.6)	0.3 (0.1)	0.0 (0.0)	0.0 (0.0)	3.1 (1.2)	9.9 (3.9)	17. (6.7)	23.5 (9.3)	125.6 (49.4)
Average precipitation days (≥ 0.2 mm)	9.5	7.5	7.9	8.7	11.9	14.9	13.7	11.8	10.8	10.0	9.3	9.4	125.4
Average rainy days (≥ 0.2 mm)	0.11	0.26	1.6	5.8	11.5	14.9	13.7	11.8	10.5	7.8	1.8	0.11	79.9
Average snowy days (≥ 0.2 cm)	9.4	7.3	6.8	3.3	0.72	0.06	0.0	0.0	0.72	2.8	8.0	9.3	48.5
Source: Environment and Climate Change Canada

== Demographics ==
Population history of Pilot Butte
Year	Pop.	±% p.a.
1916	157	—
1921	129	−3.85%
1951	48	−3.24%
1956	63	+5.59%
1961	381	+43.32%
1966	405	+1.23%
1971	403	−0.10%
1976	585	+7.74%
1981	1,255	+16.49%
1986	1,387	+2.02%
1991	1,450	+0.89%
1996	1,469	+0.26%
2001	1,850	+4.72%
2006	1,867	+0.18%
2011	1,848	−0.20%
2016	2,137	+2.95%
2021	2,638	+4.30%
Source: Statistics Canada (Note: Sources:)

In the 2021 census conducted by Statistics Canada, Pilot Butte had a population of 2,638 living in 966 of its 999 total private dwellings (at an average household size of 2.7), a change of 23.4% from its 2016 population of 2,137. With a land area of 5.71 km^{2} (2.20 sq mi), it had a population density of 462.0/km^{2} (1,196.6/sq mi) in 2021. The median age is 36.8 years old, which is lower than the median age of Canada at 41.8 years old.

As a population centre, Pilot Butte had a population of 2,364 in 2021 (making it a "small population centre"), with 2.75 km^{2} (1.06 sq mi) of the subdivision's 5.71 km^{2} (2.20 sq mi) making up this densely populated area.

Pilot Butte is part of the Regina census metropolitan area (CMA), which in the 2021 census had a population of 249,217, a change of 5.3% from its 2016 population of 236,695.

Immigrants (individuals born outside Canada) comprise 80 persons or 3.0% of the total population of Pilot Butte. The most commonly identified ethnic or cultural origins in Pilot Butte in the 2021 census were German (915 or 34.8%), English (715 or 27.2%), Scottish (505 or 19.2%), Irish (455 or 17.3%), and Ukrainian (420 or 16.0%). Nearly all Pilot Butte residents know English (2,625 or 99.8%), while other languages known by residents include French, Tagalog, Russian, German, and Ukrainian. The largest religious groups were Christianity (1,450 or 55.1%) and Irreligion (1,175 or 44.7%).

In the 2016 census, 2.7% of Pilot Butte residents identified as a visible minority and 2.3% as Aboriginal.

Canada 2016 Census		Population	% of total population (2016)
Visible minority group	Chinese	20	0.9%
Visible minority group	Black	20	0.9%
Visible minority group	Filipino	30	1.4%
Total visible minority population		70	3.3%
Aboriginal group	First Nations	20	0.9%
Aboriginal group	Métis	30	1.4%
Total Aboriginal population		50	2.3%
European		2,017	94.4%
Total		2,137	100%

== Arts and culture ==
The town hosts the Annual Pilot Butte outdoor rodeo on the third weekend of June every year since 1993, complete with cabaret featuring current country headline musicians. Pilot Butte also has the Golden Sunset Recreational Club (55+ Club), the Pilot Butte Beavers/Cubs/Scouts, a library, the Pilot Butte Photo Bunch and the Pilot Butte Riding Club.

== Attractions ==
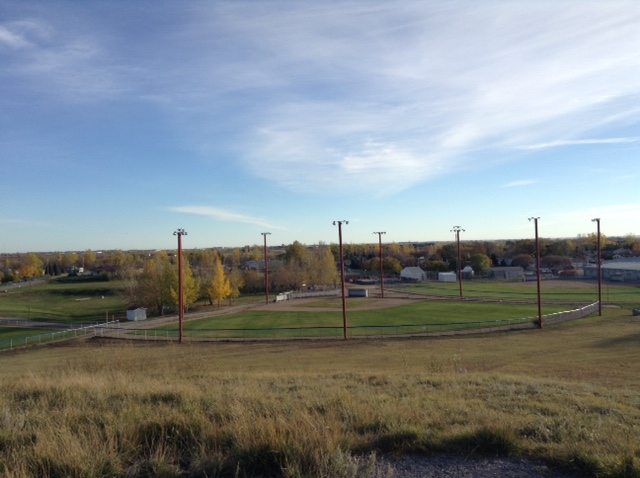
Ball diamonds as seen from the Butte Hill in Inland Park

Pilot Butte features multiple parks, most notably Inland Park, which is home to the Butte Hill, the municipal office, four baseball diamonds, the indoor and outdoor rinks, public library, two play structures, a splash park, and a skate park. The Discovery Ridge housing development is home to a pond, soccer field, and biking and walking paths. Since 2020, Pilot Butte has been home to a drive-in movie theatre, which is located directly north of town on the rodeo grounds and is only one of few in the province.

Nearby to Pilot Butte is White Butte Trails Recreation Site, which home to trails for cross-country skiing in the winter and biking and running in the summer. Also near Pilot Butte are various golf courses, including Westfalia, Green Acres, Murray, and Tor Hill.

== Sports ==
Pilot Butte has been home to the Pilot Butte Storm, a team in the Prairie Junior Hockey League, since their relocation from Regina in 1995. The team was originally called the Pilot Butte Express but were renamed to the Pilot Butte Storm in 2003 to remember the Pilot Butte storm of 1995. The Storm are four-time winners of the Prairie Junior Hockey League and won bronze at the Keystone Cup in 2011.

In 2002, Pilot Butte hosted the Western Canadian Softball Championships on its ball diamonds. Pilot Butte also hosts annual slow-pitch tournaments.

Pilot Butte’s annual rodeo has attracted visitors to the town every summer since 1993.

== Government ==
Mayors of Pilot Butte
Vic Ellis	1971–1973
Jim Sullivan	1973–1976
Ed Greenwalt	1976–1980
John Dueck	1980–1982
Fran Passmore	1982–1984
Gord Bleakley	1984–1988
Ed Zsombor	1988–2009
Sid Bowles	2009–2012
Nat Ross	2012–2016
Peggy Chorney	2016–present

Pilot Butte was initially incorporated as a village in 1913, but subsequently dissolved in 1923 due to population loss. In 1963, the community reincorporated as a village, and in 1979 it gained town status for the first time. While the village council began in 1963, the first person to be elected to the position of mayor of the town council was John Dueck in 1980. Today, Pilot Butte is governed by a council that consists of one elected mayor and six elected councillors as well as a town administrator.

== Infrastructure ==
Today, Pilot Butte is home to a post office, school, church, library, gas station, and various restaurants and manufacturing plants. Recreational facilities in town include an indoor and outdoor rink, four ball diamonds, a splash park, and various other parks.

Pilot Butte is located along provincial highways 46, 362, and 624. Highway 362, more commonly called the Pilot Butte access road, connects the town to the Trans-Canada Highway. Pilot Butte is also located along the Canadian Pacific Railway mainline, a significant factor in the town’s early development; however, this line has not been served by passenger rail since 1990 and had not stopped in Pilot Butte since the closure of its station in the interwar period.

The nearest airport serving passengers is Regina International Airport. There is also Pilot Butte Airport, an airstrip 2 kilometres south of the town.

== Education ==
Pilot Butte is home to Pilot Butte School, an elementary school with Pre-K to grade 8 education. The current school building was constructed in 1958, with a large expansion and renovation in 1988 giving the building more classrooms, a science lab, home economics lab, stage, art room, and a larger gymnasium.

High school students from Pilot Butte attend Greenall School in Balgonie.

== Media ==
The Town of Pilot Butte has distributed the News and Views newsletter since October 1987.

== Notable people ==
Notable people that were born in or lived in Pilot Butte include:

- Lee Chambers, writer, film director, and producer; lived in Pilot Butte
- Clayton Gerein, wheelchair athlete and seven-time Paralympian; lived in Pilot Butte
- Reuben Ross, diver and two-time Olympian; grew up in Pilot Butte
- Myroslaw Stechishin, Ukrainian-Canadian activist and public figure; lived in Pilot Butte

== See also ==
- List of towns in Saskatchewan
