= McLean, Saskatchewan =

Village in Saskatchewan, Canada

Village of Mclean
- Village
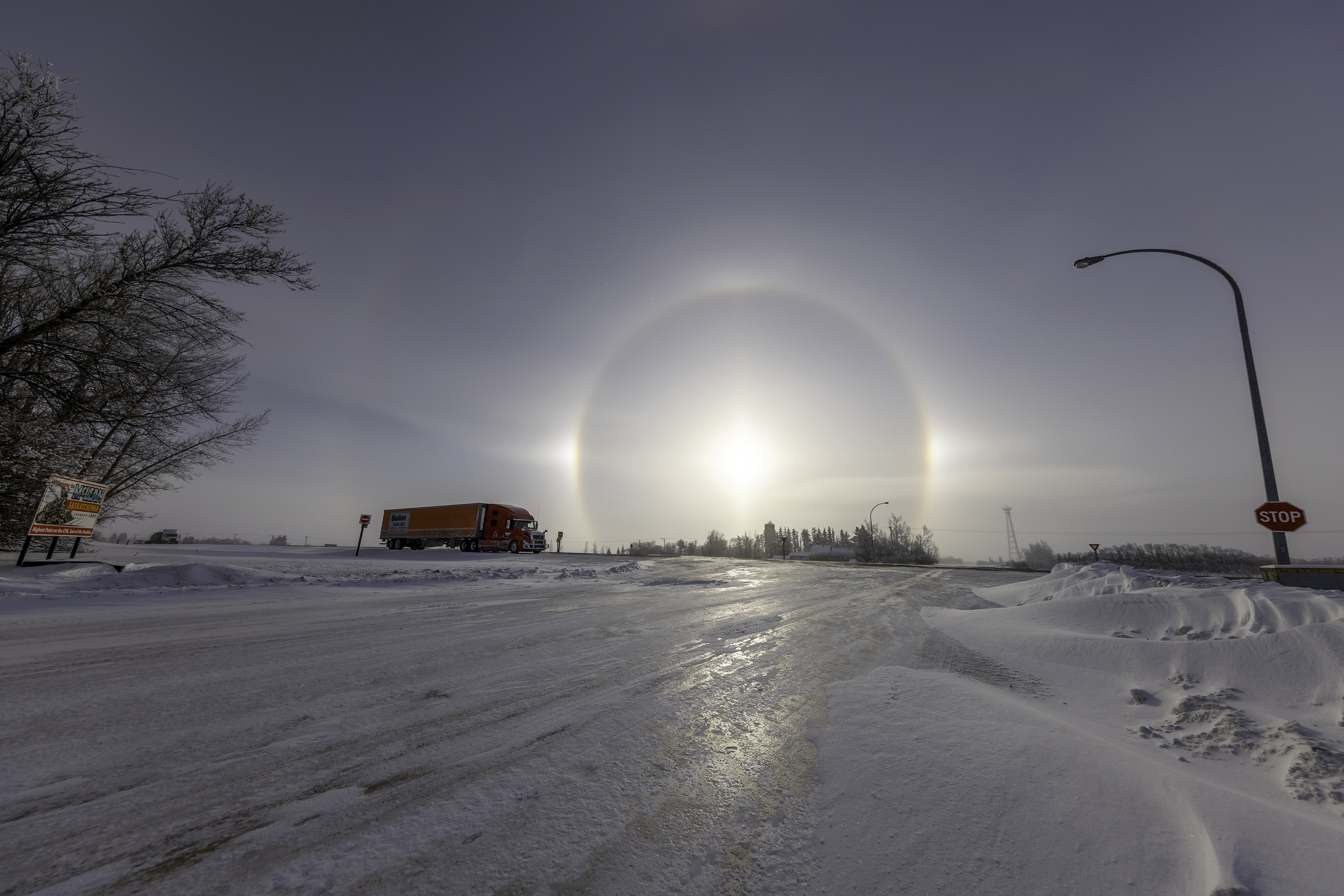
- Winter in McLean

- Location of Mclean in Saskatchewan Village of Mclean (Canada)
- Coordinates: 50.517°N 104.067°W
- Country: Canada
- Province: Saskatchewan
- Census division: 6
- Rural municipality: South Qu'appelle No. 157
- Post office Founded: The post office in McLean, Saskatchewan, was established on April 1, 1884. John Davis was the first Postmaster, serving from 1884 until 1889.
- Incorporated (Village): The village was established in 1913, dissolved in 1919, re-established in 1966.

Government
  - Mayor: Chris Bailey
  - Administrator: Melody Temrick

Area
  - Land: 1.32 km^{2} (0.51 sq mi)

Population (2021)
  - Total: 392
  - Density: 297/km^{2} (770/sq mi)
- Time zone: CST
- Postal code: S0G 3E0
- Area code: 306
- Highways: Highway 1 & SK 620

McLean (2021 population: 392) is a village in the Canadian province of Saskatchewan within the Rural Municipality of South Qu'Appelle No. 157 and Census Division No. 6. It is on Highway 1 between Qu'Appelle and Balgonie. The village of McLean is located in South-central Saskatchewan on the Trans-Canada Highway and is the highest point on the Canadian Pacific Railway mainline east of the Rockies. It is about 37 kilometres (23 mi) east of the Regina.

== History ==
McLean was settled by British people and named after William J. McLean, a Hudson's Bay Company trader and participant in the 1885 uprising. The village was established in 1913, dissolved in 1919 due to low population, and re-established in 1966 after the Trans-Canada Highway was built. The area's history is tied to the Canadian Pacific Railway (CPR), which established a station there, and was a major shipping point for milk, earning it the nickname "Cow Town".

Highest point: McLean is the highest point on the Canadian Pacific Railway mainline east of the Rocky Mountains.

Rail history: Because of its high elevation, early locomotives on the Canadian Pacific Railway used McLean as a crucial stop to take on water and fuel.

Early "Cow Town": CPR personnel once nicknamed McLean "Cow Town" because it shipped more milk than any other town on the rail line.

Hunting: In the late 1800s and early 1900s, McLean was known as a destination for hunters seeking partridge and other small game.

Present day: Today, the local economy is a mix of agriculture and businesses. Many residents commute to Regina for work.

== Demographics ==
Population history (1916–2021)
Year	Pop.	±%
1916	94	—
1971	178	+89.4%
1976	184	+3.4%
1981	189	+2.7%
1986	216	+14.3%
1991	262	+21.3%
1996	262	+0.0%
2001	271	+3.4%
2006	275	+1.5%
2011	304	+10.5%
2016	405	+33.2%
2021	392	−3.2%
Source: Statistics Canada via Saskatchewan Bureau of Statistics

In the 2021 Census of Population conducted by Statistics Canada, McLean had a population of 392 living in 148 of its 156 total private dwellings, a change of −3.2% from its 2016 population of 405. With a land area of 1.32 km^{2} (0.51 sq mi), it had a population density of 297.0/km^{2} (769.1/sq mi) in 2021.

In the 2016 Census of Population, the Village of McLean recorded a population of 405 living in 144 of its 158 total private dwellings, a 24.9% change from its 2011 population of 304. With a land area of 1.33 km^{2} (0.51 sq mi), it had a population density of 304.5/km^{2} (788.7/sq mi) in 2016.

== Transportation ==
McLean is situated 20 minutes east of Saskatchewan's capital city Regina, on the Trans-Canada Highway and the Canadian Pacific Railway (CPR) mainline, between Balgonie and Qu'Appelle.

== See also ==
- List of communities in Saskatchewan
- List of villages in Saskatchewan
