= Zehner =

Coordinates: 50°34′00″N 104°28′02″W

Location of Zehner in Saskatchewan

Zehner is an unincorporated community in the rural municipality of Edenwold No. 158, Saskatchewan in Saskatchewan. This community is approximately 19 km (12 miles) northeast of Regina at the intersection between Highways 624 and 734. It is also the administrative headquarters of the Piapot First Nation band government. Actor John Vernon was born in Zehner.

== History ==
A post office was established in 1901 under the name of Arat. In 1914, the name was changed to Zehner.

== Climate ==
Climate data for Zehner
Month	Jan	Feb	Mar	Apr	May	Jun	Jul	Aug	Sep	Oct	Nov	Dec	Year
Record high °C (°F)	7 (45)	9 (48)	20 (68)	29 (84)	33.5 (92.3)	39 (102)	37.5 (99.5)	37.5 (99.5)	34.5 (94.1)	29 (84)	18 (64)	10.5 (50.9)	39 (102)
Mean daily maximum °C (°F)	−10.4 (13.3)	−7.1 (19.2)	−0.7 (30.7)	10.3 (50.5)	17.7 (63.9)	22 (72)	24.4 (75.9)	24.5 (76.1)	17.6 (63.7)	9.9 (49.8)	−2 (28)	−8.8 (16.2)	8.1 (46.6)
Daily mean °C (°F)	−15.3 (4.5)	−11.8 (10.8)	−5.2 (22.6)	4.2 (39.6)	11.3 (52.3)	16 (61)	18.1 (64.6)	17.9 (64.2)	11.5 (52.7)	4.4 (39.9)	−6.2 (20.8)	−13.3 (8.1)	2.6 (36.7)
Mean daily minimum °C (°F)	−20.2 (−4.4)	−16.4 (2.5)	−9.7 (14.5)	−1.8 (28.8)	4.8 (40.6)	9.9 (49.8)	11.8 (53.2)	11.2 (52.2)	5.4 (41.7)	−1.2 (29.8)	−10.3 (13.5)	−17.9 (−0.2)	−2.9 (26.8)
Record low °C (°F)	−38.5 (−37.3)	−41.5 (−42.7)	−33.5 (−28.3)	−20 (−4)	−8 (18)	−1 (30)	4 (39)	−0.5 (31.1)	−6 (21)	−23 (−9)	−34.5 (−30.1)	−43 (−45)	−43 (−45)
Average precipitation mm (inches)	20.3 (0.80)	16 (0.6)	26.1 (1.03)	26.6 (1.05)	55.3 (2.18)	80.2 (3.16)	72.8 (2.87)	51.7 (2.04)	40.9 (1.61)	27.6 (1.09)	17.7 (0.70)	23.9 (0.94)	459.2 (18.08)
Source: Environment Canada
