= Balgonie =

Town in Saskatchewan, Canada

- Town
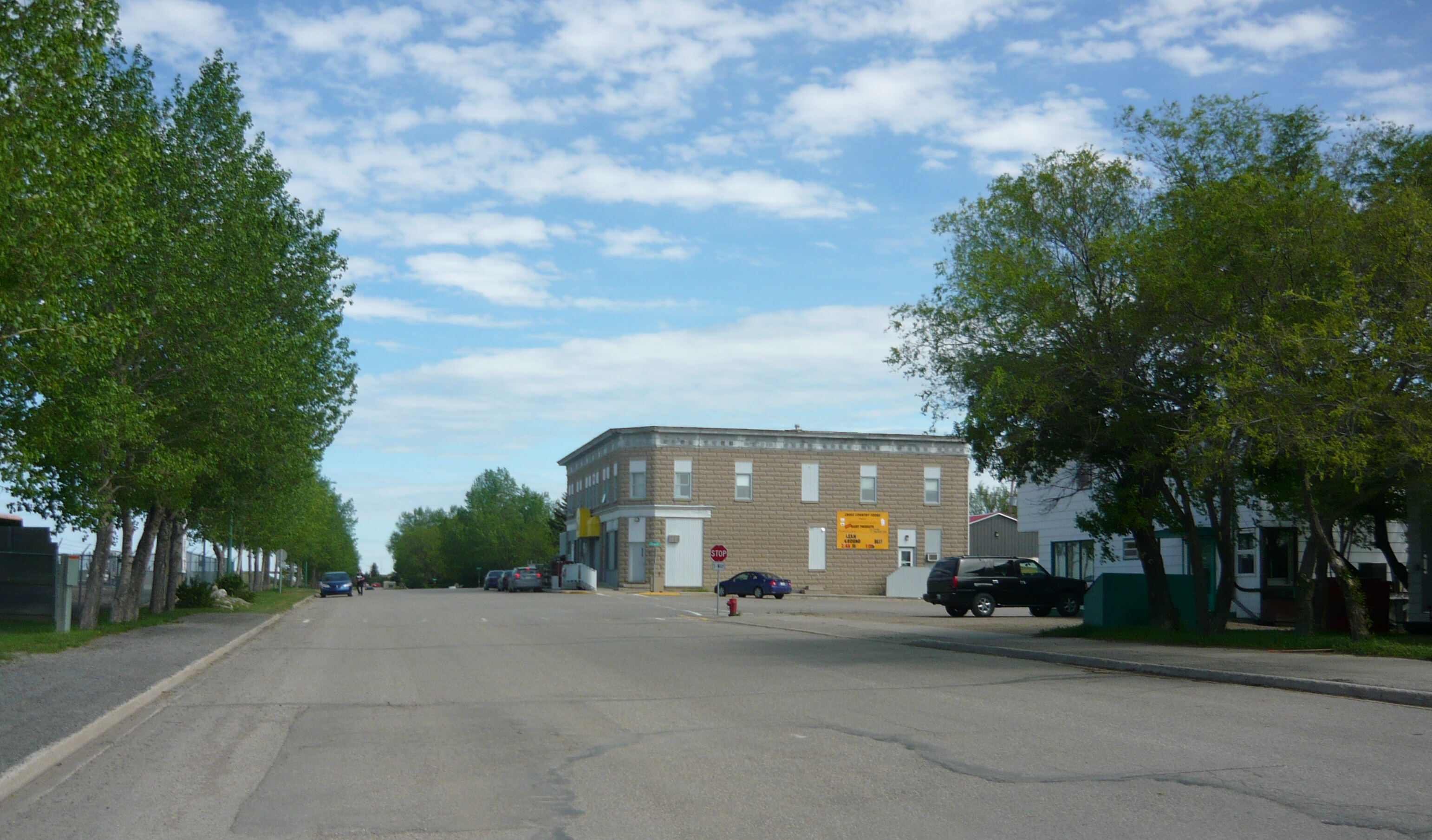
- Intersection of Main and Railway Streets

- Flag Coat of arms

- Location of Balgonie in Saskatchewan Balgonie (Canada)
- Coordinates: 50.488°N 104.269°W
- Country: Canada
- Province: Saskatchewan
- Treaty: Treaty 4
- Census division: Division No. 6
- Post office Founded: 1883
- Village incorporated: 1903
- Town incorporated: 1907

Government
  - Mayor: Lain Lovelace
  - Administrator: Karen Craigie
  - Governing body: Town Council

Area
  - Total: 4.96 km^{2} (1.92 sq mi)

Population (2016)
  - Total: 1,765
  - Density: 355.8/km^{2} (922/sq mi)
- Postal code: S0G 0E0
- Area code: 306
- Highways: Highway 1 (TCH) / Highway 10 / Highway 46 / Highway 364 / Highway 622
- Website: townofbalgonie.ca

Balgonie is a town in southeast Saskatchewan, Canada. Situated at the intersection of Highways 10, 46, 364, 622, and the Trans-Canada Highway, the town is part of the White Butte region and neighbours Pilot Butte, White City, and McLean. As well, it is located 25 kilometres (16 mi) east of the province's capital city, Regina. As of the 2016 census, Balgonie had a population of 1,765, an 8.3% growth from 2011. The town is governed by the Balgonie Town Council and is surrounded by the Rural Municipality of Edenwold No. 158.

Balgonie has a Subway restaurant, two gas stations, an outdoor pool, and an ice arena. It is also home to Greenall School.

== History ==
Balgonie was named for Balgonie Castle in Scotland. In 1882, the first train ran through the area on the Canadian Pacific Railway, and a post office was established in 1883. In 1884, Sir John Lister Kaye established a model farm near the railway in Balgonie, with the town being the easternmost point of the old 76 Ranch lands.

A school was built in 1891, and Balgonie was incorporated as a village in 1903 and as a town in 1907.

One of Balgonie's most famous residents was William Wallace Gibson (1876–1965), who created the first Canadian-built airplane. Gibson successfully flew his airplane in Victoria in 1910. Gibson was the subject of the 1991 stop-motion animated short The Balgonie Birdman, directed by Brian Duchscherer and produced by the National Film Board of Canada.

The town's population plummeted during the 1930s and 1940s, but the completion of the Trans-Canada Highway in the late 1950s brought new growth.

== Demographics ==
In the 2021 Census of Population conducted by Statistics Canada, Balgonie had a population of 1,756 living in 621 of its 628 total private dwellings, a change of −0.5% from its 2016 population of 1,765. With a land area of 4.76 km^{2} (1.84 sq mi), it had a population density of 368.9/km^{2} (955.5/sq mi) in 2021.

Canada census – Balgonie community profile

	2021	2011
Population	1,756 (-0.5% from 2016)	1,625 (+17.4% from 2006)
Land area	4.76 km^{2} (1.84 sq mi)	3.15 km^{2} (1.22 sq mi)
Population density	369.2/km^{2} (956/sq mi)	515.8/km^{2} (1,336/sq mi)
Median age	36.8 (M: 36.4, F: 37.2)	33.3 (M: 32.6, F: 34.3)
Private dwellings	628 (total) 621 (occupied)	574 (total)
Median household income	$122,000

References: 2021 2011

== See also ==
- List of communities in Saskatchewan
- List of towns in Saskatchewan
