= Rural Municipality of Edenwold No. 158 =

Rural municipality in Saskatchewan, Canada

Edenwold No. 158
- Rural municipality
- Rural Municipality of Edenwold No. 158
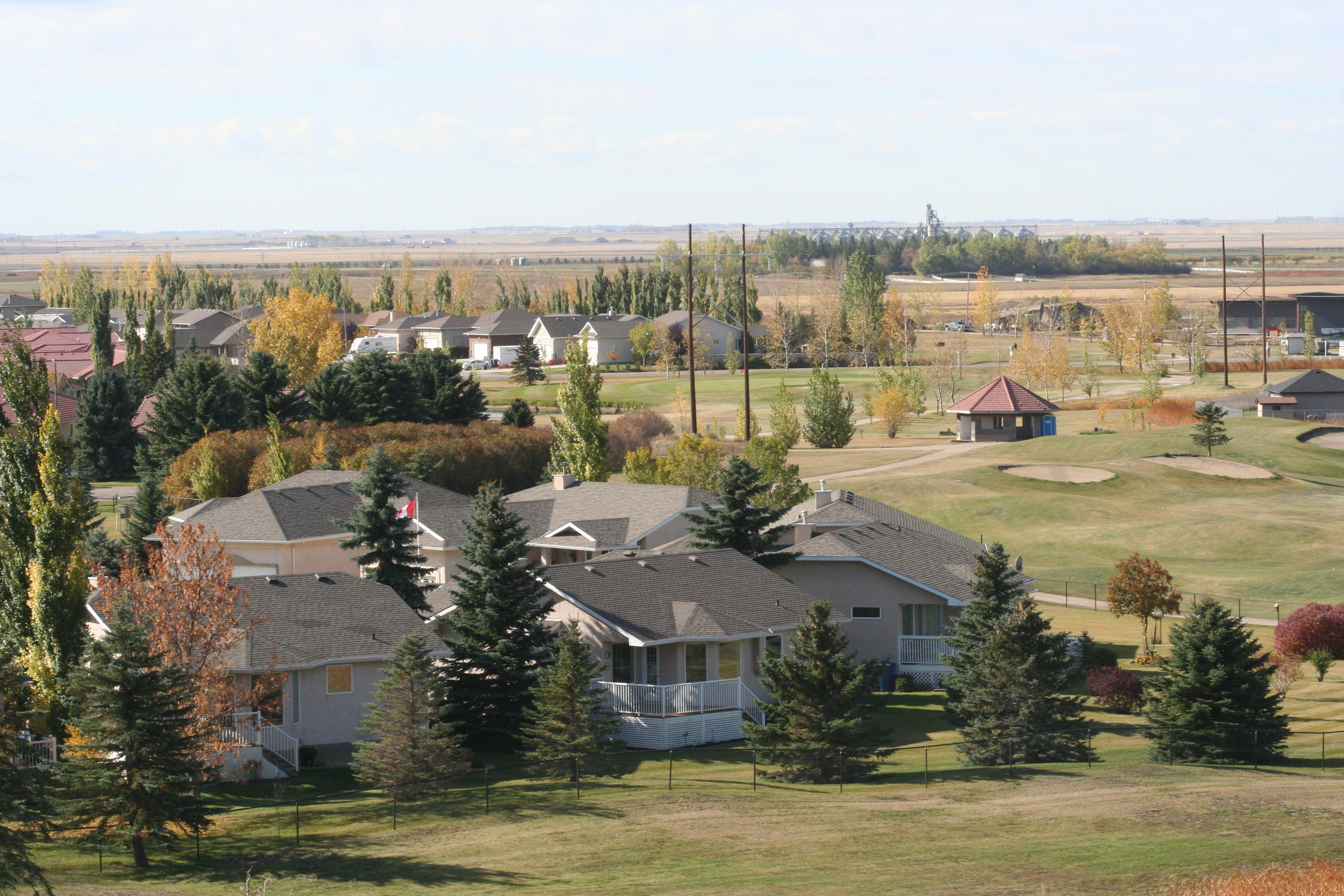
- The community of Emerald Park

- Location of the RM of Edenwold No. 158 in Saskatchewan
- Coordinates: 50.648°N 104.349°W
- Country: Canada
- Province: Saskatchewan
- Census division: 6
- SARM division: 2
- Formed: December 9, 1912

Government
  - Reeve: Al Trainor
  - Governing body: RM of Edenwold No. 158 Council
  - Administrator: Karen Zaharia
  - Office location: Emerald Park

Area (2016)
  - Land: 849.04 km^{2} (327.82 sq mi)

Population (2016)
  - Total: 4,490
  - Density: 5.3/km^{2} (14/sq mi)
- Time zone: CST
  - Summer (DST): CST
- Area codes: 306 and 639
- Website: Official website

The Rural Municipality of Edenwold No. 158 (2016 population: 4,490) is a rural municipality (RM) in the Canadian province of Saskatchewan within Census Division No. 6 and SARM Division No. 2. It is located in the southeast portion of the province, east of the City of Regina.

== History ==
Indigenous peoples of the prairies inhabited the area for many years before any European settlement. Aboriginal people, who camped near Boggy Creek, used the Butte in Pilot Butte as a lookout and signal point.

European settlement in the area can be traced back to the 1840s. With the construction of the railway through the region in 1882, the towns of Pilot Butte and Balgonie were founded. In the following years, settlers began farming in the district and the two towns developed.

The RM of Edenwold No. 158 incorporated as a rural municipality on December 9, 1912.

In the late 1950s, the Trans-Canada Highway was completed and living outside of Regina began to become a popular option for those who wanted to commute to work in the city. Since then, the RM has seen significant population growth.

== Geography ==
In this area, the loggerhead shrike (Lanius ludovicianus excubitorides) and Sprague's pipit (Anthus spragueii) are both threatened species that are being monitored by conservationists.

=== Climate ===
The RM of Edenwold experiences a dry humid continental climate (Köppen: Dfb) in the NRC Plant Hardiness Zone 3b. The RM of Edenwold has warm summers and cold, dry winters, prone to extremes at all times of the year. Precipitation is heaviest from June through August in the form of rain, while snow is common in the winter. An average summer day has a high of 24.5 °C (76.1 °F), although temperatures can reach as high as 40.0 °C (104.0 °F), while the average winter day has a low of −20.2 °C (−4.4 °F), with temperatures reaching below −45.0 °C (−49.0 °F).

Climate data for Zehner, 1981–2010 normals
Month	Jan	Feb	Mar	Apr	May	Jun	Jul	Aug	Sep	Oct	Nov	Dec	Year
Record high °C (°F)	7.0 (44.6)	9.0 (48.2)	20.0 (68.0)	29.0 (84.2)	33.5 (92.3)	39.0 (102.2)	37.5 (99.5)	37.5 (99.5)	34.5 (94.1)	29.0 (84.2)	18.0 (64.4)	10.5 (50.9)	39.0 (102.2)
Mean daily maximum °C (°F)	−10.4 (13.3)	−7.1 (19.2)	0.7 (33.3)	10.3 (50.5)	17.7 (63.9)	22.0 (71.6)	24.4 (75.9)	24.5 (76.1)	17.6 (63.7)	9.9 (49.8)	−2 (28)	−8.8 (16.2)	8.1 (46.6)
Daily mean °C (°F)	−15.3 (4.5)	−11.8 (10.8)	−5.2 (22.6)	4.2 (39.6)	11.3 (52.3)	16.0 (60.8)	18.1 (64.6)	17.9 (64.2)	11.5 (52.7)	4.4 (39.9)	−6.2 (20.8)	−13.3 (8.1)	2.6 (36.7)
Mean daily minimum °C (°F)	−20.2 (−4.4)	−16.4 (2.5)	−9.7 (14.5)	−1.8 (28.8)	4.8 (40.6)	9.9 (49.8)	11.8 (53.2)	11.2 (52.2)	5.4 (41.7)	−1.2 (29.8)	−10.3 (13.5)	−17.9 (−0.2)	−2.9 (26.8)
Record low °C (°F)	−38.5 (−37.3)	−41.5 (−42.7)	−33.5 (−28.3)	−20 (−4)	−8 (18)	−1 (30)	4.0 (39.2)	−0.5 (31.1)	−6 (21)	−23 (−9)	−34.5 (−30.1)	−43 (−45)	−43 (−45)
Average rainfall mm (inches)	0.1 (0.00)	0.2 (0.01)	2.8 (0.11)	16.4 (0.65)	48.2 (1.90)	81.3 (3.20)	80.5 (3.17)	53.7 (2.11)	42.8 (1.69)	22.5 (0.89)	1.9 (0.07)	0.0 (0.0)	350.4 (13.80)
Average snowfall cm (inches)	21.6 (8.5)	15.1 (5.9)	23.6 (9.3)	7.2 (2.8)	4.0 (1.6)	0.3 (0.1)	0.0 (0.0)	0.0 (0.0)	3.1 (1.2)	9.9 (3.9)	17.3 (6.8)	23.5 (9.3)	125.6 (49.4)
Source: Environment Canada

=== Communities and localities ===
In addition to the following list, the RM also neighbours six First Nations and six other RMs.

Urban municipalities

The following urban municipalities are surrounded by the RM:

- Balgonie
- Pilot Butte
- White City
- Edenwold

Organized hamlets

The following organized hamlets are within the RM:

- Crawford Estates

Localities

The following localities are also within the RM.

- Coppersands
- Dreghorn
- Emerald Park
- Franksburg
- Frankslake
- Jameson
- Kathrintal Colony
- Milaty
- Poplar Park
- Richardson
- Seitzville
- Zehner

== Demographics ==
Population history (1981–2016)
Year	Pop.	±%
1981	1,773	—
1986	1,992	+12.4%
1991	2,349	+17.9%
1996	2,738	+16.6%
2001	3,005	+9.8%
2006	3,611	+20.2%
2011	4,167	+15.4%
2016	4,490	+7.8%
Source: Statistics Canada via Saskatchewan Bureau of Statistics

In the 2021 Census of Population conducted by Statistics Canada, the RM of Edenwold No. 158 had a population of 4,466 living in 1,515 of its 1,576 total private dwellings, a change of −0.5% from its 2016 population of 4,490. With a land area of 848.84 km^{2} (327.74 sq mi), it had a population density of 5.3/km^{2} (13.6/sq mi) in 2021.

In the 2016 Census of Population, the RM of Edenwold No. 158 recorded a population of 4,490 living in 1,509 of its 1,546 total private dwellings, a 8.7% change from its 2011 population of 4,132. With a land area of 849.04 km^{2} (327.82 sq mi), it had a population density of 5.3/km^{2} (13.7/sq mi) in 2016. The RM of Edenwold No. 158 is the second largest rural municipality by population in Saskatchewan and is the 19th largest municipality in the province overall.

== Government ==
The RM of Edenwold No. 158 is governed by an elected municipal council and an appointed administrator that meets on the second and fourth Tuesday of every month. The reeve of the RM is Al Trainor while its Chief Administrative Officer is Shauna Bzdel. The RM's office is located in Emerald Park.

=== Municipal district planning ===
In 2020, the Village of Edenwold and the RM initiated a process to establish Saskatchewan's first municipal district. Not specifically urban nor rural, a municipal district is a municipality that combines both types of municipalities, similar to specialized municipalities in Alberta such as Strathcona County or the Regional Municipality of Wood Buffalo. Public engagement of residents in both affected municipalities occurred in September 2021, which was followed by a survey in late November/early December. An open house is planned for January 2022. If an application to amalgamate the two municipalities is approved, the proposed name of the municipality is the Municipal District of Edenwold.

== Parks and recreation ==
- White Butte Trails Recreation Site
