= Edenwold =

Village in Saskatchewan, Canada

- Village
- Village of Edenwold
- Location of Edenwold Edenwold (Canada)
- Coordinates: 50°37′59″N 104°15′07″W
- Country: Canada
- Province: Saskatchewan
- Region: Southeast
- Census division: 6
- Rural municipality: Edenwold No. 158
- Incorporated (Village): 1912

Government
  - Type: Municipal
  - Governing body: Edenwold Village Council
  - Mayor: Dean Josephson
  - Administrator: Christine Galbraith

Area
  - Total: 0.68 km^{2} (0.26 sq mi)

Population (2016)
  - Total: 233
  - Density: 340.3/km^{2} (881/sq mi)
- Time zone: UTC−06:00 (CST)
- Postal code: S0G 1K0
- Area code: 306
- Highways: Highway 364 / Highway 640
- Railways: Canadian National Railway
- Website: Village of Edenwold

Edenwold (2016 population: 233) is a village in the Canadian province of Saskatchewan within the Rural Municipality of Edenwold No. 158 and Census Division No. 6. It is located 45 kilometres (28 mi) north of the city of Regina.

== History ==
Edenwold incorporated as a village on October 3, 1912.

== Demographics ==
Population history (1981–2016)
Year	Pop.	±%
1981	143	—
1986	174	+21.7%
1991	175	+0.6%
1996	198	+13.1%
2001	226	+14.1%
2006	242	+7.1%
2011	238	−1.7%
2016	233	−2.1%
Source: Statistics Canada via Saskatchewan Bureau of Statistics

In the 2021 Census of Population conducted by Statistics Canada, Edenwold had a population of 243 living in 89 of its 95 total private dwellings, a change of 4.3% from its 2016 population of 233. With a land area of 0.69 km^{2} (0.27 sq mi), it had a population density of 352.2/km^{2} (912.1/sq mi) in 2021.

In the 2016 Census of Population, the Village of Edenwold recorded a population of 233 living in 88 of its 92 total private dwellings, a −2.1% change from its 2011 population of 238. With a land area of 0.68 km^{2} (0.26 sq mi), it had a population density of 342.6/km^{2} (887.5/sq mi) in 2016.

== See also ==
- List of communities in Saskatchewan
- List of villages in Saskatchewan
