= Saskatchewan Highway 10 =

Provincial highway in Saskatchewan, Canada

Highway 10
- Highway 10 highlighted in red and Highway 10A highlighted in blue
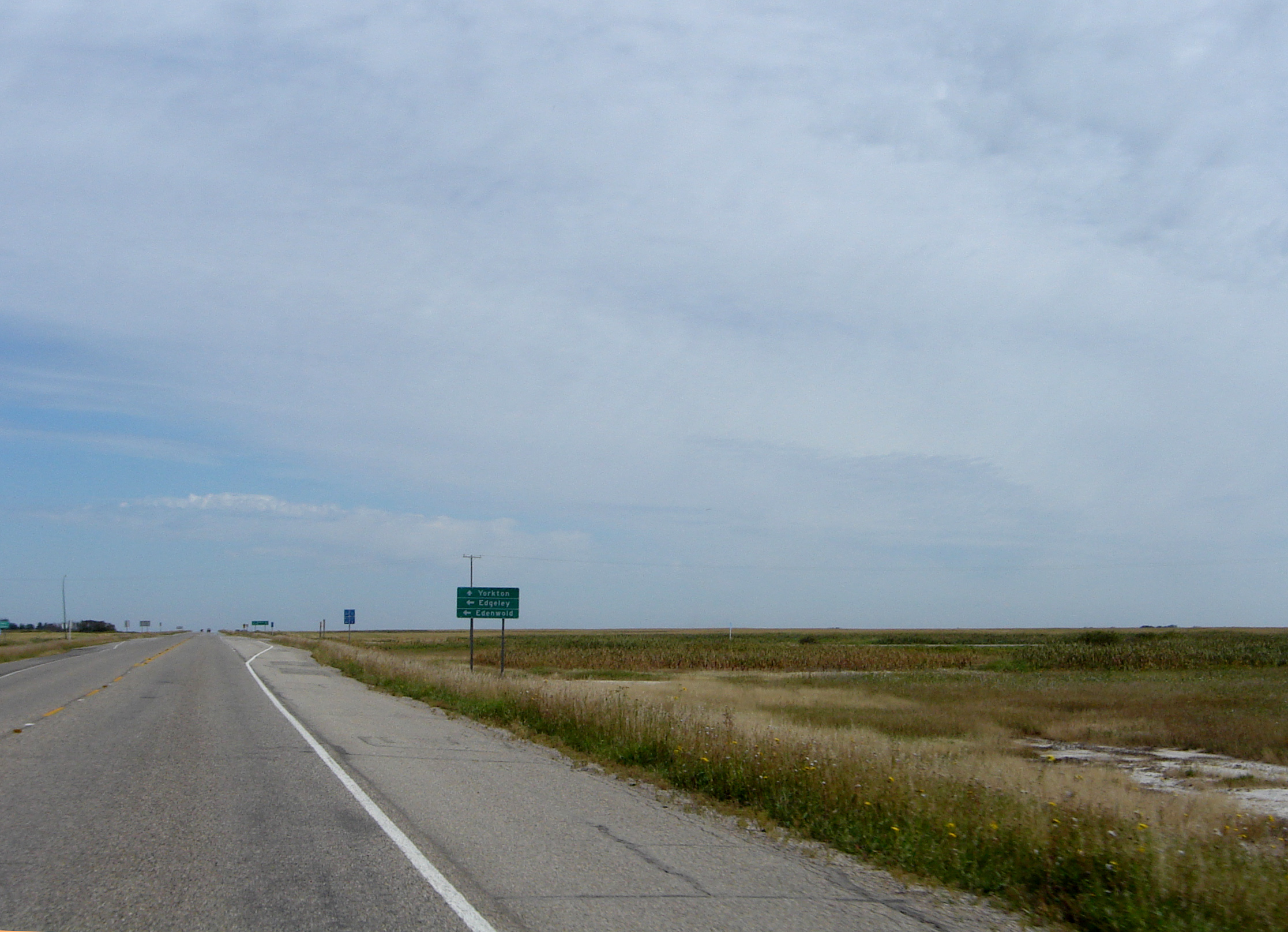
- Highway 10

Route information
- Maintained by Ministry of Highways and Infrastructure
- Length: 225.1 km (139.9 mi)

Major junctions
- West end: Highway 1 (TCH) near Balgonie
- Highway 35 near Fort Qu'Appelle; Highway 22 near Balcarres; Highway 15 / Highway 47 at Melville; Highway 9 / Highway 16 (TCH/YH) at Yorkton; Highway 8 north / Highway 80 near Wroxton; Highway 8 south near Manitoba border
- East end: PTH 5 at Manitoba border near Lake of the Prairies

Location
- Country: Canada
- Province: Saskatchewan
- Rural municipalities: Edenwold, South Qu'Appelle, North Qu'Appelle, Abernethy, McLeod, Stanley, Cana, Orkney, Wallace, Calder
- Major cities: Melville, Yorkton
- Towns: Fort Qu'Appelle

Highway system
- Provincial highways in Saskatchewan
← Highway 9	→ Highway 11

Highway 10 is an east–west provincial highway in Saskatchewan, Canada. Except for a short four-lane section at the city of Yorkton, it is an undivided highway for its entire length. It runs from Highway 1 near Balgonie until it transitions into PTH 5 at the Manitoba border. Highway 10 is about 225 kilometres (140 mi) long and is paved for its entire length. It passes through the towns of Fort Qu'Appelle and Balcarres and the cities of Melville and Yorkton. It intersects the major Highways of 1 (the Trans-Canada Highway), 8, 9 (the Saskota Flyway), and 16 (the Yellowhead Highway). The highway is a component of Canada's National Highway System and the section between Highway 1 and the intersection with Highway 9 / Highway 16 concurrency in Yorkton, it is designated as a Core Route.

The Melville–Yorkton section of Highway 10 used to go through Willowbrook; in the 1960s Highway 10 was realigned to a more direct route with the bypassed section becoming part of Highway 47 and Highway 52.

== Route description ==
Most of Highway 10 is an undivided highway that runs from Highway 1 at Balgonie east to the Manitoba border. Only a short 3.7-kilometre (2.3 mi) section at Yorkton is four lanes. Along the way, the highway crosses the Qu'Appelle Valley at Fort Qu'Appelle and runs through the cities of Melville and Yorkton. Its eastern terminus is at the precipice of the valley that leads down into the Lake of the Prairies where it continues on as Manitoba's Highway 5.

At the eastern edge of Balgonie, Highway 10 begins at an interchange with Highway 1 and travels in a north-easterly direction towards the Qu'Appelle Valley. En route, it crosses Echo Creek (three separate times), provides access to Edgeley, intersects Highways 364 and 210, and has a 10-kilometre (6.2 mi) long concurrency with Highway 35 that ends at the town of Fort Qu'Appelle. As the highway approaches Fort Qu'Appelle, it drops down into the Qu'Appelle Valley. Fort Qu'Appelle is situated between Echo Lake and Mission Lake on the valley floor with the Qu'Appelle River running along the north side of town. At the intersection where Highway 10 and 35's concurrency ends, Highway 35 turns north (running concurrently with Highway 22) while 10 continues north-east. At this point, Highways 10 and 22 begin a 26-kilometre (16 mi) long concurrency that crosses the Qu'Appelle River, intersects Highway 56, then climbs out of the valley. Once out of the valley, the highway straightens out and starts travelling eastward where it provides access to Hugonard and Balcarres. At Balcarres, Highway 10 intersects the northbound Highway 310 and the southbound Highway 619. About 8 kilometres (5.0 mi) east of Balcarres, the concurrency ends with Highway 22 turning south to Abernethy and Highway 10 curving to the north-east. Old Highway 10 Road, which travels east for about 1.6 kilometres (1 mi), meets Highway 22 at the junction with Highway 10. From the end of its concurrency with 22, Highway 10 travels north-east for 4.4 kilometres (2.7 mi) before travelling east-northeast to Lorlie, Highway 617, Duff, Colmer, and Highway 618. Just over 2 kilometres west of Duff, it crosses Pheasant Creek — a tributary of the Qu'Appelle River. About 2 kilometres (1.2 mi) from 618, Highway 10 turns east for almost 4.5 kilometres (2.8 mi) then turns north-east, intersecting Highways 47 and 740.

As Highway 10 approaches the city of Melville, it begins a 2.8-kilometre (1.7 mi) long concurrency with Highway 47, crosses railway tracks via an overpass, and intersects Highway 15. Highway 15 heads east into the city while the 10 / 47 concurrency skirts around it along the eastern, then northern edge. Highway 47 leaves the concurrency heading due north at the northern end of Melville near the golf course while 10 curves away from the city in a north-easterly direction towards Yorkton. En route to Yorkton, the highway passes through Brewer, Otthon, and the Yorkton weigh scale at the western end of York Lake.

Highway 10 approaches Yorkton from the south-west and, at an intersection at the south-western corner of the city, it turns east and runs along the southern city limits as Queen Street. North at that intersection is Highway 10A, the original routing of Highway 10 through Yorkton. Highway 10 travels along the southern limits of Yorkton for 4 kilometres (2.5 mi) at which point it meets Highways 9 and 16 at an intersection south-east of the city. It turns north and runs concurrently as a four-lane highway with 9 and 16 for 1.7 kilometres (1.1 mi). At the intersection of the end of the concurrency, Highways 9 and 16 continue north, Highway 10A comes in from the west and Highway 10 turns east towards Manitoba as Broadway Street E. For the first 700 metres (2,300 ft) of eastward travel, the highway continues as four lanes. Highway 10 leaves Yorkton from the east end of the city and heads east to Manitoba.

From Yorkton's eastern city limits to the border with Manitoba is 62.4 kilometres (38.8 mi). This stretch of highway provides access to the communities of Calley, Tonkin, Dunleath, Barvas, and Kessock. It also intersects Highways 637, 8, 80, and 369. Almost 38 kilometres (24 mi) east of Yorkton, Highway 10 has a junction with Highways 8 and 80. At that intersection, Highway 80 heads south to Churchbridge and Highway 16 while 8 travels north to Wroxton and Kamsack. Highways 8 and 10 then share a 19.7-kilometre (12.2 mi) long eastward concurrency. At the end of the concurrency, 8 turns south and 10 continues east. At Highway 10's eastern terminus in Saskatchewan, it carries on into Manitoba as Manitoba Highway 5. At the border, Saskatchewan's Highway 10 and Manitoba's Highway 5 are met by Manitoba's southbound Provincial Road 482, which provides access to Lake of the Prairies and Asessippi Provincial Park.

== Major intersections ==
From west to east:

Rural municipality	Location	km	mi	Destinations	Notes
Edenwold No. 158	Balgonie	0.0	0.0	Highway 1 (TCH) west – Regina	Interchange; eastbound exit and westbound entrance
South Qu'Appelle No. 157		11.3	7.0	Range Road 2163 – Avonhurst	
South Qu'Appelle No. 157		13.4	8.3	Highway 734 west / Highway 620 south – Frankslake, McLean	
South Qu'Appelle No. 157	Edgeley	24.5	15.2	Highway 364 west – Edenwold	
North Qu'Appelle No. 187		33.6	20.9	Highway 210 north – Echo Valley Provincial Park	
North Qu'Appelle No. 187		35.6	22.1	Highway 35 south – Qu'Appelle, Weyburn	West end of Hwy 35 concurrency
North Qu'Appelle No. 187	Fort Qu'Appelle	46.0	28.6	Highway 35 north to Highway 22 – Wadena; To Highway 56 – Fort San, Indian Head; To Highway 210 south – Echo Valley Provincial Park	East end of Hwy 35 concurrency; Hwy 56 passes underneath Hwy 10 east of intersection
Abernethy No. 186	Balcarres	63.8	39.6	Highway 310 north – Ituna Highway 619 south – Indian Head	
Abernethy No. 186		71.9	44.7	Highway 22 east – Abernethy, Lemberg	
Abernethy No. 186		88.2	54.8	Highway 617 – Wolseley, Goodeve	West of Duff
Stanley No. 215		109.1	67.8	Highway 618 south	
City of Melville		117.1	72.8	Highway 47 south – Grenfell, Estevan Highway 740 west – Westview	West end of Hwy 47 concurrency
City of Melville		118.0	73.3	Highway 15 (3rd Avenue W) – Ituna, Bredenbury	
City of Melville		119.8	74.4	Highway 47 north (Queen Street) – Springside	East end of Hwy 47 concurrency
Cana No. 214	No major junctions				
Orkney No. 244	No major junctions				
City of Yorkton		155.8	96.8	Highway 10A east to Highway 52 – City Centre	Hwy 10 branches east
City of Yorkton		159.7	99.2	Highway 9 south – Whitewood Highway 16 (TCH/YH) east – Winnipeg	Hwy 10 branches north; west end of Hwy 9 / Hwy 16 concurrence
City of Yorkton		161.4	100.3	Highway 10A west / Highway 16A (TCH) west (Broadway Street) to Highway 52 – City Centre Highway 16 (TCH/YH) west / Highway 9 north – Canora, Saskatoon	Hwy 10 branches east; east end of Hwy 9 / Hwy 16 concurrence
Wallace No. 243	Tonkin	174.3	108.3	Highway 637 south – Saltcoats	West end of Hwy 637 concurrency
Wallace No. 243		179.2	111.3	Highway 637 north – Rhein	East end of Hwy 637 concurrency
Calder No. 241	Wroxton	200.3	124.5	Highway 8 north – Kamsack; Highway 80 south – Churchbridge, Esterhazy	West end of Hwy 8 concurrency
Calder No. 241		210.1	130.6	Calder access road	
Calder No. 241		220.0	136.7	Highway 8 south – MacNutt, Langenburg	East end of Hwy 8 concurrency
Calder No. 241		221.9	137.9	Highway 369 north – Togo	
Calder No. 241		225.1	139.9	PR 482 south – Dropmore, Shellmouth, Asessippi Provincial Park	Saskatchewan–Manitoba border
Calder No. 241		225.1	139.9	PTH 5 east – Roblin, Dauphin	Continuation into Manitoba
1.000 mi = 1.609 km; 1.000 km = 0.621 mi: Concurrency terminus; Incomplete access; Route transition

== Highway 10A ==
Highway 10A
- Location: Yorkton
- Length: 5.0 km (3.1 mi)

Highway 10A is a highway in Saskatchewan serving the city of Yorkton. It runs from Highway 10 at the city's southwestern limits to Highway 16 / Highway 9 / Highway 10. Like most alternate routes, it was the original configuration for Highway 10 through Yorkton.

The highway travels northeast for approximately 2 kilometres (1.2 mi) from Highway 10 (Queen Street) to Highway 52, where it travels east along Broadway Street. At Gladstone Avenue, Highway 16A joins Broadway Street, and the two highways run concurrently to its eastern terminus as Highway 16 / Highway 9 / Highway 10. Highway 10 continues east along Broadway Street.

Highway 10A is about 5 kilometres (3 mi) long.

=== Major intersections ===
From west to east: The entire route is in Yorkton.

km	mi	Destinations	Notes
0.0	0.0	Highway 10 (Queen Street) – Regina, Melville, Dauphin	Hwy 10A western terminus
1.9	1.2	Broadway Street (Highway 52 west) – Ituna	Hwy 10A follows Broadway Street
3.2	2.0	Gladstone Avenue (Highway 16A (TCH) west) – Saskatoon	West end of Hwy 16A concurrency
5.0	3.1	Highway 16 (TCH) / Highway 9 / Highway 10 west – Saskatoon, Canora, Whitewood, Winnipeg Broadway Street (Highway 10 east) – Dauphin Highway 16A (TCH) ends	Hwy 10A / Hwy 16A eastern terminus
1.000 mi = 1.609 km; 1.000 km = 0.621 mi: Concurrency terminus

== See also ==
- Transportation in Saskatchewan
- Roads in Saskatchewan
