= Saskatchewan Highway 381 =

Provincial highway in Saskatchewan, Canada

Highway 381

Route information
- Maintained by Ministry of Highways and Infrastructure
- Length: 24.5 km (15.2 mi)

Major junctions
- West end: Highway 80 north of Churchbridge
- Highway 8 at MacNutt
- East end: PR 547 at Manitoba border near MacNutt

Location
- Country: Canada
- Province: Saskatchewan
- Rural municipalities: Churchbridge

Highway system
- Provincial highways in Saskatchewan
← Highway 379	→ Highway 394

Highway 381 is a provincial highway in Saskatchewan, Canada. It runs from Highway 80 until the Manitoba border, where it transitions into Provincial Road 547. It is about 24.5 kilometres (15.2 mi) long.

Highway 381 passes through the village of MacNutt and intersects Highway 8.

== Route description ==
Hwy 381 begins at an intersection with Hwy 80, several kilometres north of the town of Churchbridge, with the road continuing west as Township Road 243. It heads east through rural farmland for several kilometres, crossing Range Road 1313, which provides access to the village of Calder just to the north, on its way to pass through the southern part of the village of MacNutt, where it has a junction with Hwy 8 and crosses a former railway line. The highway continues due eastward, leaving the village behind to come to an end at the Manitoba border, with the road continuing east as Manitoba Provincial Road 547 (PR 547). The entire length of Hwy 381 is an unpaved, two-lane gravel road, lying entirely within the Rural Municipality of Churchbridge No. 211.

== Major intersections ==
From west to east:

Rural municipality	Location	km	mi	Destinations	Notes
Churchbridge No. 211		0.0	0.0	Highway 80 – Churchbridge, Wroxton	Western terminus; road continues west as Township Road 243
Churchbridge No. 211		9.8	6.1	Range Road 1313 – Calder	
Churchbridge No. 211	MacNutt	19.7	12.2	Highway 8 to Highway 10 – Langenburg	
Churchbridge No. 211		24.5	15.2	PR 547 east to PR 482 – Roblin, Dropmore	Continuation into Manitoba; eastern terminus
1.000 mi = 1.609 km; 1.000 km = 0.621 mi

== See also ==
- Transportation in Saskatchewan
- Roads in Saskatchewan
