= Saskatchewan Highway 80 =

Provincial highway in Saskatchewan, Canada

Highway 80
- Highway 80 highlighted in red

Route information
- Maintained by Ministry of Highways and Infrastructure
- Length: 66.7 km (41.4 mi)

Major junctions
- South end: Highway 22 in Esterhazy
- Highway 16 (TCH/YH) in Churchbridge
- North end: Highway 8 / Highway 10 near Wroxton

Location
- Country: Canada
- Province: Saskatchewan
- Rural municipalities: Fertile Belt, Langenburg, Churchbridge, Calder

Highway system
- Provincial highways in Saskatchewan
← Highway 60	→ Highway 99

Highway 80 is a provincial highway in the Canadian province of Saskatchewan. The highway runs from Highway 22 near Esterhazy to Highway 8 / Highway 10 near Wroxton. It is about 67 kilometres (42 mi) long.

Highway 80 passes near the communities of Yarbo and Churchbridge and intersects Highways 16 (Yellowhead Highway), 723, 725, and 381.

== Route description ==
Hwy 80 begins in the Rural Municipality of Fertile Belt No. 183 at an intersection with Hwy 22, just across Kaposvar Creek from the town of Esterhazy. It heads northeast through rural areas to enter the Rural Municipality of Langenburg No. 181, traveling just to the west of Yarbo (accessed via Township Road 201) and just to the east of The Mosaic Company's K1, K2, and K3 Potash mines as it crosses over two railway lines. The highway now curves more northward to cross Cutarm Creek via a Causeway and travel through several kilometres of rural farmland, eventually entering the Rural Municipality of Churchbridge No. 211 and the town of Churchbridge itself, traveling through neighborhoods along Raikes Street before having an intersection with the Yellowhead Highway (Hwy 16) and making a sudden right onto Vincent Avenue W to travel through downtown after a railroad crossing. Hwy 80 now makes a left onto Rankin Road, passing through neighborhoods before leaving town and heading north through rural farmland for the next several kilometres, traveling to the east of Beresina as it has intersections with Hwy 723, Hwy 725, and Hwy 381. Now entering the Rural Municipality of Calder No. 241, after traveling through several kilometres of rural areas, Hwy 80 comes to an end on the south side of Wroxton at the junction between Hwy 8 and Hwy 10, with the road continuing on as northbound Hwy 8. The entire length of Hwy 80 is a paved, two-lane highway.

== Major intersections ==
From south to north:

Rural municipality	Location	km	mi	Destinations	Notes
Fertile Belt No. 183	Esterhazy	0.0	0.0	Highway 22 – Stockholm, Gerald, Binscarth	Southern terminus; continues as Highway 22 west
Langenburg No. 181		6.4	4.0	Township Road 201 – Yarbo	
Churchbridge No. 211	Churchbridge	31.4	19.5	Highway 16 (TCH/YH) – Yorkton, Langenburg, Winnipeg	
Churchbridge No. 211		37.2	23.1	Highway 723 – Bredenbury	
Churchbridge No. 211		48.6	30.2	Highway 725 west – Saltcoats	
Churchbridge No. 211		51.9	32.2	Highway 381 east – MacNutt	
Calder No. 241	Wroxton	66.7	41.4	Highway 8 / Highway 10 – Kamsack, Yorkton, Dauphin	Northern terminus; continues as Highway 8 north
1.000 mi = 1.609 km; 1.000 km = 0.621 mi

== See also ==
- Transportation in Saskatchewan
- Roads in Saskatchewan
