= Manitoba Provincial Road 482 =

Provincial road in Manitoba, Canada

Provincial Road 482

Route information
- Maintained by Department of Infrastructure
- Length: 46.5 km (28.9 mi)
- Existed: 1966–present

Major junctions
- North end: PTH 5 / Highway 10 near Saskatchewan border
- South end: PTH 83 near Inglis

Location
- Country: Canada
- Province: Manitoba
- Rural municipalities: Riding Mountain West, Roblin

Highway system
- Provincial highways in Manitoba; Winnipeg City Routes
← PR 481	→ PR 483

Provincial Road 482 (PR 482) is provincial road in the far western part of the Parkland Region of the Canadian province of Manitoba.

== Route description ==
Provincial Road 482 is a north–south route and runs from the PTH 83 near Inglis to its terminus with PTH 5 and Hwy 10 just east of the Saskatchewan border. The northern terminus also serves as the westbound/eastbound terminuses for both PTH 5 and Hwy 10. The route provides direct access to Lake of the Prairies and Asessippi Provincial Park.

From PTH 83, PR 482 travels in an east–west direction for approximately eight kilometres (5.0 mi) before meeting westbound PR 549. From PR 549, the road turns north and slightly east for five kilometres (3.1 mi) before descending into the Shell Valley and the entrance to Asessippi Provincial Park. PR 482 turns north along the Shellmouth Dam at this point.

After passing the Shellmouth Dam, PR 482 continues north and west, ascending out of the Shell Valley before passing the unincorporated community of Dropmore. The road continues west for a short distance before turning north. From this point, PR 482 travels very close to or along the Manitoba — Saskatchewan border for the rest of the route. Approximately 11 kilometres (6.8 mi) north of Dropmore, PR 482 intersects westbound PR 547, which along with Hwy 381 serves the village of MacNutt. The highway travels for another 15 kilometres (9.3 mi) from PR 547 before descending back into the Shell Valley near Lake of the Prairies to its northern terminus. PR 482 makes a very brief turn into Saskatchewan just south of its northern terminus.

PR 482 is a paved road for its entire length. The speed limit along this road is 90 km/h.

== Major intersections ==
Division	Location	km	mi	Destinations	Notes
Riding Mountain West		0.0	0.0	PTH 83 – Roblin, Russell	Southern terminus; road continues east as Road 131N
Riding Mountain West		2.4	1.5	Asessippi Ski Area	Access road into ski area
Riding Mountain West		8.2	5.1	PR 549 west – Shellmouth	Eastern terminus of PR 549
Riding Mountain West	Asessippi Provincial Park	11.1	6.9	Asessippi Provincial Park main entrance	Access road into park
Riding Mountain West	Asessippi Provincial Park	11.1– 12.5	6.9– 7.8	Shellmouth Dam across the Assiniboine River	
Riding Mountain West	Dropmore	18.7	11.6	Road 170W – Dropmore	
Riding Mountain West		28.5	17.7	PR 547 west to Highway 381 west – MacNutt	Eastern terminus of PR 547
Roblin	No major junctions				
Crossover into Saskatchewan		45.1– 46.0	28.0– 28.6	Crossover into Saskatchewan	
Roblin		46.5	28.9	PTH 5 east (Parks Route) – Roblin; Highway 10 west – Yorkton	Northern terminus
1.000 mi = 1.609 km; 1.000 km = 0.621 mi

== Related routes ==
=== Provincial Road 547 ===
Provincial Road 547
- Road 141N
- Location: Rural Municipality of Riding Mountain West
- Length: 3.2 km (2.0 mi)
- Existed: 1980–present

Provincial Road 547 (PR 547) is an extremely short east-west spur of PR 482 in the Rural Municipality of Riding Mountain West. Serving as an eastern continuation of Saskatchewan Highway 381 (Hwy 381), it provides access to the town of MacNutt, Saskatchewan and is entirely a paved, two-lane highway.

=== Provincial Road 549 ===
Provincial Road 549
- Road 131N
- Location: Shellmouth
- Length: 6.8 km (4.2 mi)
- Existed: 1992–present

Provincial Road 549 (PR 549) is a short 6.8-kilometre-long (4.2 mi) east–west spur of PR 482 in the Rural Municipality of Riding Mountain West, providing the primary road access to the town of Shellmouth. It is entirely gravel, two-lane highway for its entire length, with no other major intersections. It does include a bridge across the Assiniboine River in Shellmouth.

Division	Location	km	mi	Destinations	Notes
Riding Mountain West		0.0	0.0	Township Road 230 to Highway 8 – Langenburg, MacNutt	Continuation into Saskatchewan; western terminus
Riding Mountain West	Shellmouth	1.6	0.99	Bridge over the Assiniboine River	
Riding Mountain West		6.8	4.2	PR 482 – Asessippi Provincial Park, Inglis	Eastern terminus
1.000 mi = 1.609 km; 1.000 km = 0.621 mi
