= Manitoba Provincial Road 547 =

Provincial road in Manitoba, Canada

Provincial Road 547

Route information
- Maintained by Department of Infrastructure
- Length: 3.2 km (2.0 mi)
- Existed: 1980–present

Major junctions
- West end: Highway 381 at Saskatchewan border near MacNutt
- East end: PR 482

Location
- Country: Canada
- Province: Manitoba
- Rural municipalities: Riding Mountain West

Highway system
- Provincial highways in Manitoba; Winnipeg City Routes
← PR 545	→ PR 549

Provincial Road 547 (PR 547) is a short east–west provincial road in the Parkland Region of Manitoba, Canada. It starts at PR 482 16 kilometres (9.9 mi) northwest of Asessippi Provincial Park and terminates at the Saskatchewan border five kilometres (3.1 mi) east of MacNutt, where it continues as Saskatchewan's Highway 381. The main purpose of PR 547 is to serve as a connector spur between PR 482 and Highway 381, which, along with Saskatchewan's Highway 8, serves the border village of MacNutt.

The length of PR 547 is 3.20 kilometres (1.99 mi), and it is paved for its entire length. The speed limit along this road is 90 kilometres per hour (56 mph).

== Major intersections ==
Division	Location	km	mi	Destinations	Notes
Riding Mountain West		0.0	0.0	Highway 381 west – MacNutt	Continuation into Saskatchewan; western terminus
Riding Mountain West		3.2	2.0	PR 482 – Roblin, Dropmore	Eastern terminus; road continues east as Road 141N
1.000 mi = 1.609 km; 1.000 km = 0.621 mi
