= Jedburgh, Saskatchewan =

Hamlet in Saskatchewan, Canada

Jedburgh
- Hamlet
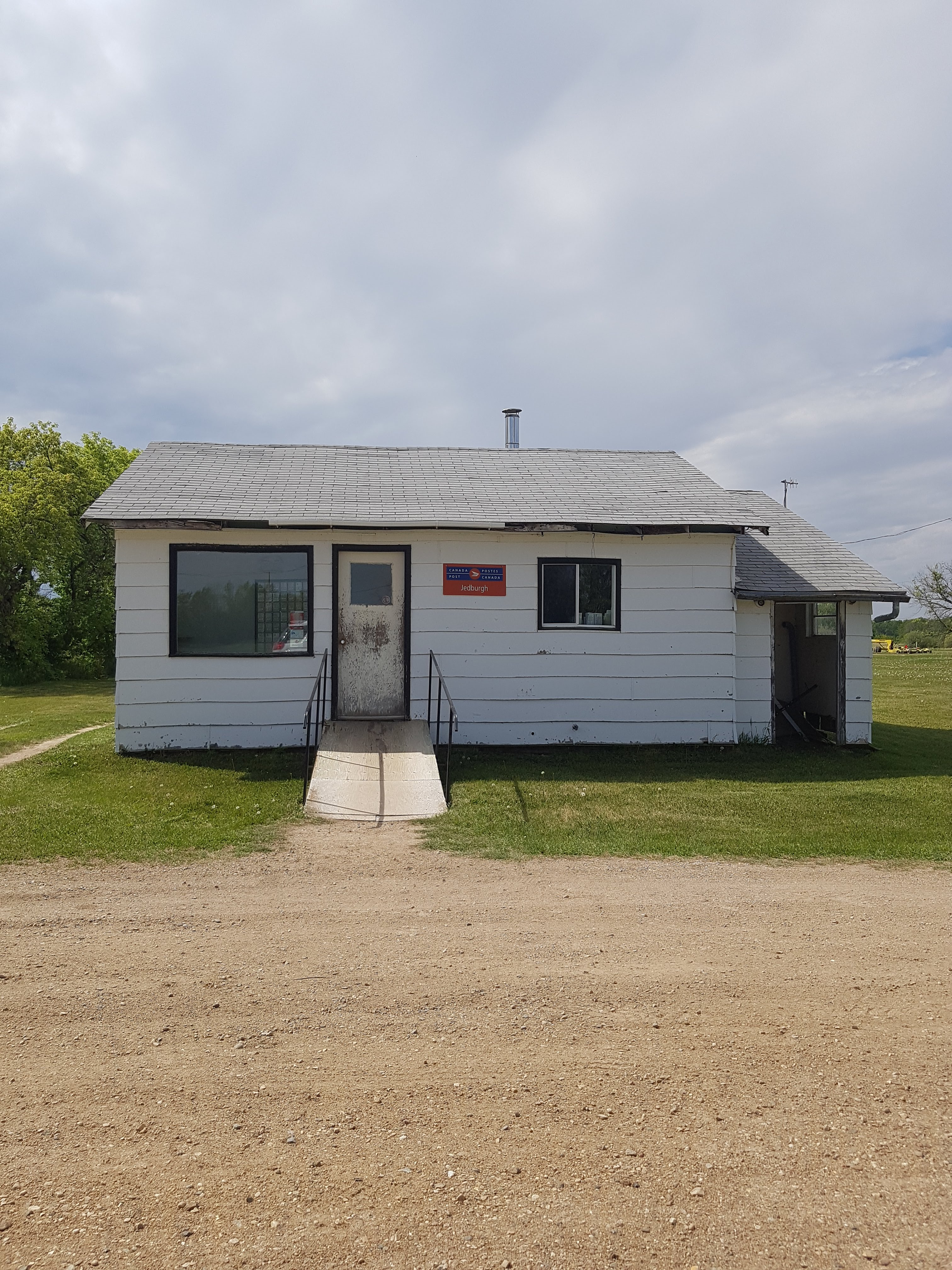

- Location within Saskatchewan Location within Canada
- Coordinates: 51.175511°N 102.594937°W
- Country: Canada
- Province: Saskatchewan
- Region: Southeast
- Census division: 9
- Rural municipality: Garry No. 245
- Established: 1900s

Government
  - Governing body: Garry No. 245
  - Reeve: Garry Dubiel
  - Administrator: Tanis Ferguson
- Time zone: CST
- Postal code: S0A 1R0
- Area code: 306
- Highways: Highway 52
- Railways: Canadian National Railway Defunct

Jedburgh is a hamlet in the Rural Municipality of Garry No. 245, Saskatchewan, Canada. The hamlet is located at the junction of Range Road 80 and Township Road 270 approximately 20 kilometres (12 mi) northwest of the city of Yorkton. The seat of the RM of Garry No. 245 is in Jedburgh.

== History ==
Jedburgh is located on a former branch line of the Canadian National Railway that used to run northwest of Yorkton and ended at Parkerview. With the rapid influx of settlers in the early 1900s and the building of a school, the demand for mail service grew. In 1910, Mr. Peter Hoy was hired to drive the mail in twice a week from Theodore about 15 kilometres (9.3 mi) north of Jedburgh. With a democrat (a light four-wheeled cart with several seats, one behind the other) and team of horses, Peter serviced Gladwin, Jedburgh, and Beaver Dale.

Faced with the necessity of finding a name for the new district, Mr. Joe Clark, the postmaster at Yorkton, and Mr. William Barber went into conference. From these two men came the suggestion that the district be named after the birthplace of the first mailman, Mr. Peter Hoy of Jedburgh, Scotland. Jedburgh was an important grain delivery point and in 1970 still supported four grain elevators, all of which have since been demolished with the loss of the railway.

== See also ==
- Scottish place names in Canada
- List of communities in Saskatchewan
- List of hamlets in Saskatchewan
