= Fitzmaurice, Saskatchewan =

Unincorporated community in Saskatchewan, Canada

Fitzmaurice is an unincorporated area in the Rural Municipality of Garry No. 245, in the Canadian province of Saskatchewan. Fitzmaurice is north of Highway 52 and west of Highway 617 in eastern Saskatchewan.

== See also ==
- List of communities in Saskatchewan
