= Rock Dell =

Rock Dell or Rockdell can refer to:

- Rock Dell, Saskatchewan, a community in Canada
- Rock Dell Township, Olmsted County, Minnesota, a township in the United States
- Rockdell Formation, a geologic formation in Tennessee, United States
