= Stornoway, Saskatchewan =

Special service area in Saskatchewan, Canada

Coordinates: 51.2948°N 102.0344°W

Stornoway is a special service area within the Rural Municipality of Wallace No. 243 in Saskatchewan, Canada. In 2006 the community had a population of 10 people. It previously held the status of village until December 31, 2006. The community is located east of the city of Yorkton 10 kilometres (6.2 mi) north of Highway 10. The community was founded in the late 1890s by Robert MacKay of Stornoway, Scotland.

== See also ==
- List of communities in Saskatchewan
- List of hamlets in Saskatchewan
