= Tonkin, Saskatchewan =

Community in Saskatchewan, Canada

Tonkin
- Hamlet
- Location within Saskatchewan Location within Canada
- Coordinates: 51°13′0″N 102°16′2″W
- Country: Canada
- Province: Saskatchewan
- Census division: 9
- Rural Municipality: Wallace No. 243
- Time zone: CST
- Area code: 306
- Highways: Hwy 10

Tonkin is a hamlet in Rural Municipality of Wallace No. 243, Saskatchewan, Canada. The hamlet is located on Highway 10 about 202 km (126 mi) northeast of Regina and 16 kilometres (10 mi) east of Yorkton.

== See also ==
- List of communities in Saskatchewan
