= CJEZ-FM =

Radio station in Esterhazy, Saskatchewan

- Esterhazy, Saskatchewan; Canada
- Frequency: 99.5 MHz (FM)

Programming
- Format: community radio

Ownership
- Owner: 5777152 Manitoba Ltd.

History
- First air date: To be announced

Technical information
- Class: LP
- ERP: 50 watts

Links
- Website: ezradio.ca

CJEZ-FM is a community radio station that will broadcast at 99.5 FM in Esterhazy, Saskatchewan, Canada.

On November 21, 2018, 5777152 Manitoba Ltd. which is wholly owned and controlled by William Gade, received an approval by the Canadian Radio-television and Telecommunications Commission (CRTC) to operate a new commercial FM radio station at Esterhazy, Saskatchewan, which would operate at 99.5 MHz with an effective radiated power of 50 watts (non-directional antenna with an effective height of antenna above average terrain of 30 metres). The station would offer a country, pop and rock music format intended to serve the widest possible demographic.

The CJEZ callsign was formerly used by a radio station in Toronto, Ontario, which is known today as CHBM-FM.
