= Darleen Bogart =

Canadian Braille literacy advocate

Darleen Bogart OC is a Canadian Braille literacy advocate. She is a founding member of Canadian Braille Authority and served as its president. She was appointed an Officer of the Order of Canada in 2017.

== Early life and education ==
Bogart was born in Churchbridge, Saskatchewan, the youngest of seven children.

== Career ==
Bogart's mother-in-law was involved with the Canadian National Institute for the Blind (CNIB) and encouraged her to volunteer. She became a volunteer at the Women’s College Hospital beginning in the 1960s. Bogart joined the Braille Authority of North America (BANA) Planning Committee board from 1982 and 1988. She eventually became chair of the BANA in 1991 and was a key figure in the adoption of Unified English Braille in 2004. As a result, she received the 1992 Arthur Napier Magill Distinguished Service Award from CNIB. From 1991 until 2012, she was a founding member and President of the Canadian Braille Authority (now known as Braille Literacy Canada).

In 2015, Bogart received the BANA Braille Excellence Award and was later awarded the Volunteer Recognition Award from CNIB. Two years later, she was appointed an Officer of the Order of Canada in 2017. Due to her advocacy work, Bogart is an honorary life member of the Hospital Auxiliaries Association of Ontario. As of 2017, Bogart sits on the Women's College Research Institute Research Ethics Board and the Advisory Council of the Foundation.
