= Winnipeg Free Press =

Canadian newspaper

- Front page – January 11, 2007
- Type: Daily newspaper
- Format: Broadsheet
- Owner: FP Canadian Newspapers Limited Partnership
- Founder: William Fisher Luxton
- President: Mike Power
- Editor: Paul Samyn
- Founded: November 30, 1872
- Headquarters: 1355 Mountain Avenue; Winnipeg, Manitoba, Canada
- Readership: 194,000 weekdays 270,000 Saturdays, print and digital (as of Vividata SCC | Spring 2025)
- Sister newspapers: Brandon Sun
- ISSN: 0828-1785
- OCLC number: 1607085
- Website: winnipegfreepress.com

Logo in 2012

The Winnipeg Free Press (founded as the Manitoba Free Press) is a daily (excluding Sunday) broadsheet newspaper in Winnipeg, Manitoba, Canada. It provides coverage of local, provincial, national, and international news, as well as current events in sports, business, and entertainment and various consumer-oriented features, such as homes and automobiles appear on a weekly basis.

The Free Press was founded in 1872, only two years after Manitoba became part of Canada, in 1870. The newspaper's founding predated Winnipeg's own incorporation, in 1873. The Winnipeg Free Press has since become the oldest newspaper in Western Canada that is still active.

== Timeline ==
On November 30, 1872, the Manitoba Free Press was launched by William Fisher Luxton and John A. Kenny. Luxton bought a press in New York City and, along with Kenny, rented a shack at 555 Main Street, near the present corner of Main Street and James Avenue.

In 1874, the paper moved to a new building on Main Street, across from St. Mary Avenue.

In 1882, control of the Free Press was passed on to Clifford Sifton. The organization subsequently moved to a building on McDermot Avenue, where it would remain until 1900.

In 1900, the paper moved to a new address on McDermot Avenue at Albert Street.

In 1901, John Wesley Dafoe served as president, editor-in-chief, and editorial writer for the WFP until 1944.

In 1905, the newspaper moved to a four-storey building at Portage and Garry.

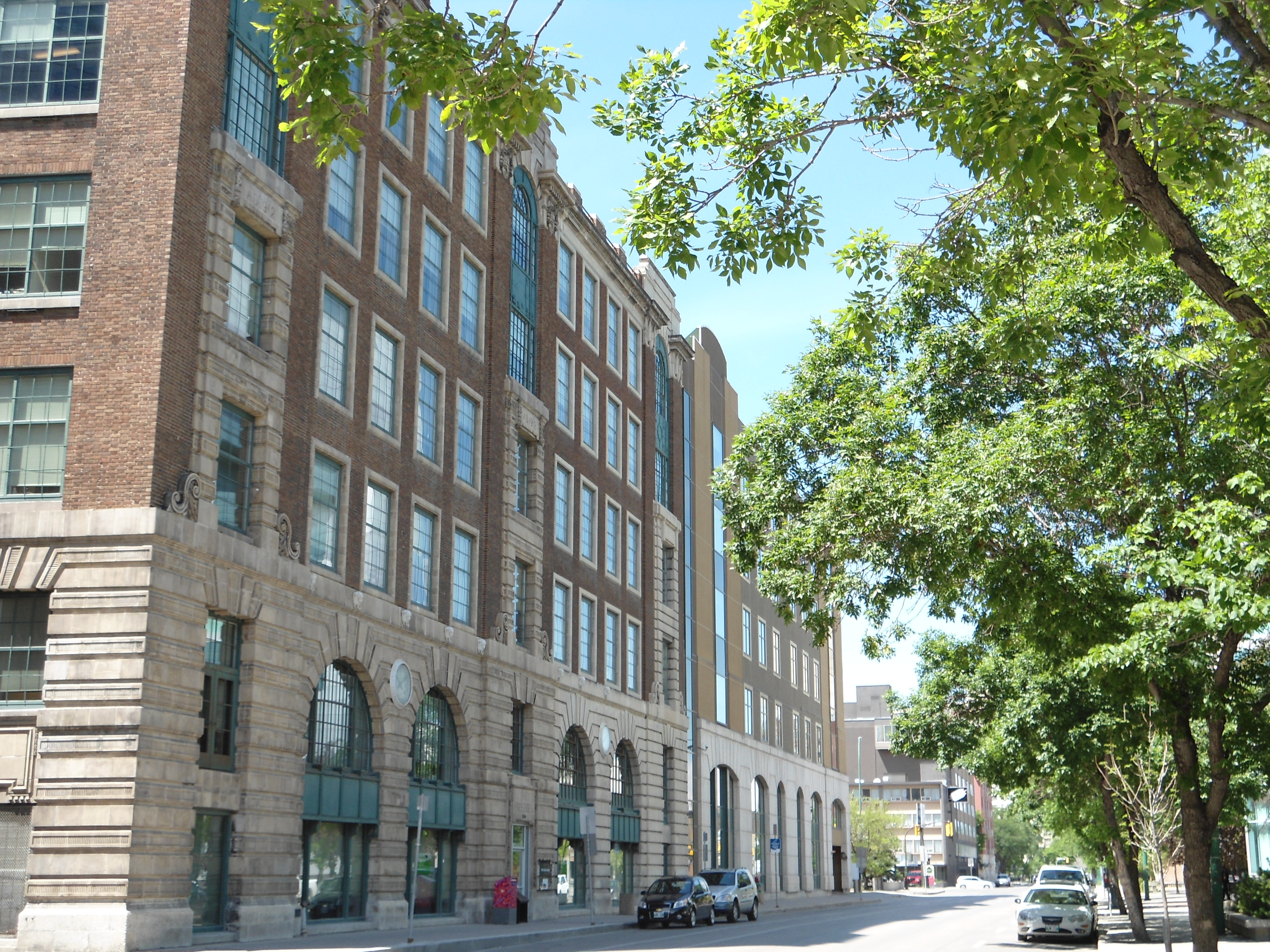
Historic Free Press building on Carlton

In 1913, the newspaper moved to 300 Carlton Street and would remain there for 78 years.

In 1920, the Free Press took its newsprint supplier before the Judicial Committee of the Privy Council for violating the War Measures Act during World War I. The newspaper won the case, known as Fort Frances Pulp and Paper v Manitoba Free Press, as the court determined that whether the state of national emergency continued after the war was a political matter for Parliament.

On February 21, 1923, Harry Houdini was placed in a straitjacket by two city police officers and then was hoisted by his feet and, attached to ropes and pulleys, was suspended 30 feet (10 metres) above the sidewalk off the side of the Winnipeg Free Press Building. Almost impossibly, he escaped. The newspaper ran an amateur photo contest with impressive cash prizes of $15, $10 and $5 for the three best images of the escape. The contest was won by L. B. Foote, who went on to chronicle events for the Free Press for two decades.

On December 2, 1931, the paper was renamed the Winnipeg Free Press.

In 1991, the Free Press moved to its current location in the Inkster Industrial Park, a CA$150 million plant at 1355 Mountain Avenue.

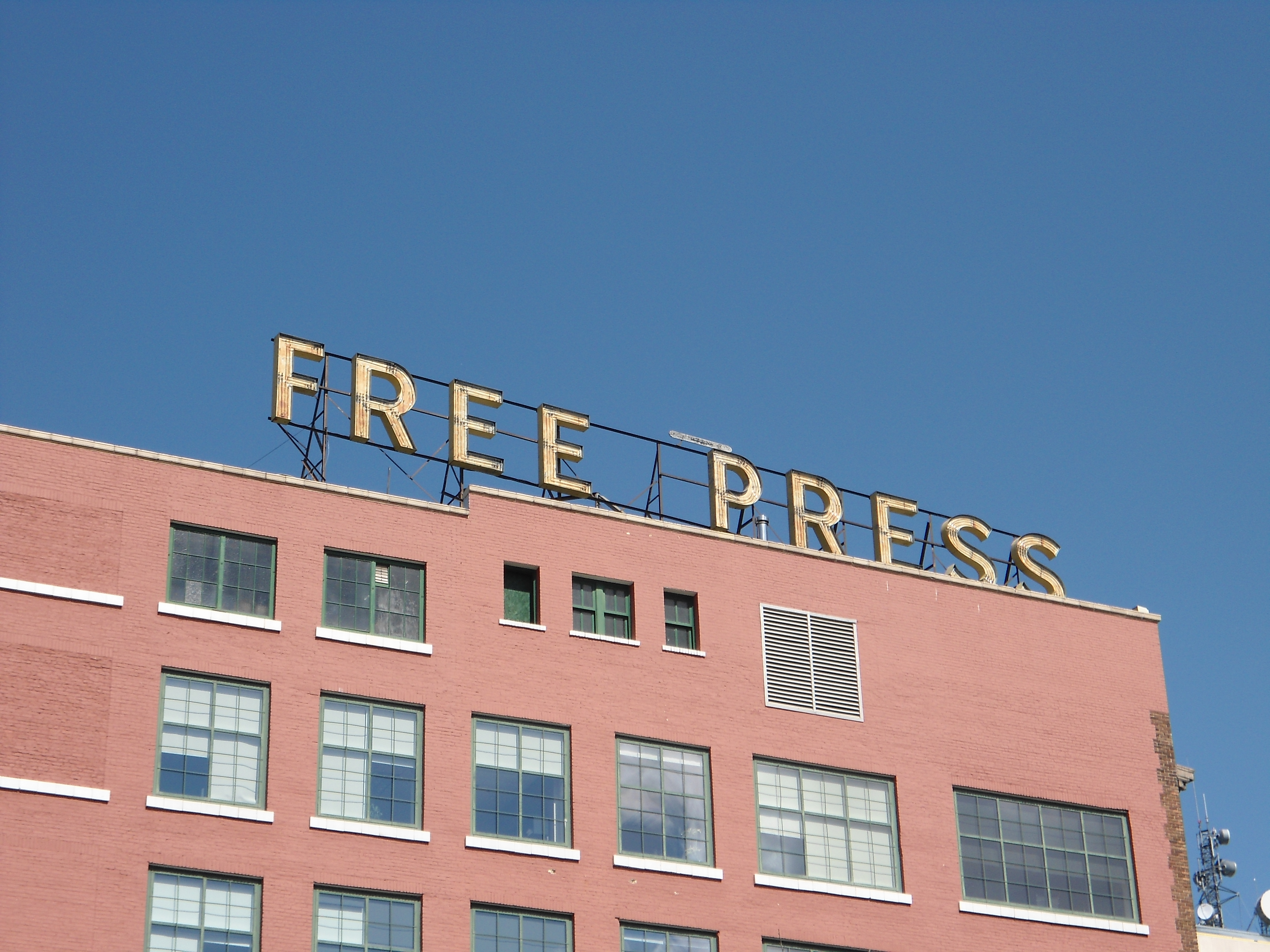
Former newspaper headquarters on Carlton Street

In December 2001, the Free Press and its sister paper, Brandon Sun, were bought from Thomson Newspapers by FP Canadian Newspapers Limited Partnership.

In July 2026, the paper announced it will shutter the Community Review, its free weekly community newspaper.

== Strike ==
In 2008, at noon on Thanksgiving Day (Monday, October 13), about 1,000 members of the Communications, Energy and Paperworkers Union, representing editorial, advertising, circulation, and press staff, as well as newspaper carriers, launched a strike action. The strike ended 16 days later, when the union ratified the final offer on Tuesday, October 28. The contract was ratified by 67% of newspaper carriers, 75% of the pressmen, and 91% of the inside workers, including journalists. The recent five-year contract was negotiated, ratified, and signed in 2013, with no threat of a strike. Workers and managers negotiated directly with great success, without the need of a lawyer that previous contracts had required.

== Circulation ==
As of November 1, 2009, the WFP ceased publishing a regular Sunday edition. In its place, a Sunday-only tabloid called On 7 was launched, but it has since been discontinued.

On March 27, 2011, the impending arrival of Metro in the Winnipeg market caused the Sunday newspaper to be retooled as a broadsheet format, Winnipeg Free Press SundayXtra. The Sunday edition is now available exclusively online.

According to figures via Canadian Newspaper Association, the Free Press' average weekday circulation for 2013 was 108,583, while on Saturdays it was 144,278. Because of the relatively small population of Manitoba, that meant that over 10% of the population could be receiving the paper and its advertisements. Like most Canadian daily newspapers, the Free Press has seen a decline in circulation, dropping its total by 17% to 106,473 copies daily from 2009 to 2015.

Daily average

As of 2023, the Winnipeg Free Press media kit claims that 1.15 million users visit the newspaper's network of sites each month, and that in Winnipeg, 439,000 adults read the publication in print or digital format each week.

== Notable staff ==
- John Wesley Dafoe 1901-1944, president, editor-in-chief, & wrote influential editorials
- Charles Edwards (1928 – early-1930s): journalist and news agency executive
- Bartley Kives (2000–2016): arts and news writer; left to join CBWT-DT as a television journalist.
- Vince Leah (1980–1993): journalist, writer, sports administrator and member of the Order of Canada
- Bob Moir (1948–1958): television producer, sports commentator, and journalist
- Hal Sigurdson (1951–1963; 1976–1996): columnist and sports editor from 1976 to 1989
- Maurice Smith (1927–1937; 1940–1976): columnist and sports editor from 1944 to 1976
- Scott Young (1936–1940): sports writer from 1936 to 1940

== See also ==
- List of newspapers in Canada
