= Maurice Smith (journalist) =

Canadian journalist (1909–1985)

- Born: November 30, 1909; London, England
- Died: February 21, 1985 (aged 75); Hawaii, US
- Occupation: Journalist
- Known for: Winnipeg Free Press
- Awards: Canadian Football Hall of Fame; Manitoba Hockey Hall of Fame

Maurice Douglas Burnet Smith (November 30, 1909 – February 21, 1985) was an England-born Canadian journalist. He began working for the Winnipeg Free Press in 1927, became a sports journalist in 1930, then served as the paper's sports editor from 1944 to 1976. He wrote a regular sports column titled "Time Out", and frequently reported on baseball, ice hockey, curling, and Canadian football. He helped establish the Canadian High School Curling Championships in 1951, and was the founding president of the Manitoba Sportswriters and Sportscasters Association in 1955. He covered 33 consecutive Grey Cup championships before retirement, then served on the selection committees of Canada's Sports Hall of Fame and the Manitoba Sports Hall of Fame and Museum. He was made a life member of the Manitoba Curling Association in 1970, inducted into the Football Reporters of Canada section of the Canadian Football Hall of Fame in 1982, and was posthumously inducted into the Manitoba Hockey Hall of Fame in 1987.

== Early life ==
Maurice Douglas Burnet Smith was born on November 30, 1909, in London, England. He was the youngest of two children to parents George and Mary Smith, had English heritage, and immigrated to Winnipeg in 1913. He worked as a paperboy in his youth and was rewarded for his service with a gold watch at age 10. He became a copy boy for the business department of the Winnipeg Free Press in 1927, then became a sports reporter in the early 1930s. He went to Scotland in 1937, where he wrote programs for the Scottish Ice Hockey Association, and met his wife Ann McKenzie in Perth. They married on October 13, 1939, moved to Winnipeg in 1940, then Smith resumed working for the Free Press.

== Sports editor ==
Smith became sports editor of the Free Press in 1944, succeeding Ed Armstrong who vacated the position to become city editor. Smith wrote the sports column "Time Out", and reported regularly on baseball, ice hockey, curling, and Canadian football. He followed the Winnipeg Blue Bombers and covered 33 consecutive Grey Cup championships.

In collaboration with Ken Watson and others, Smith helped establish the Canadian High School Curling Championships in 1951. Smith was the founding president of the Manitoba Sportswriters and Sportscasters Association (MSSA) in 1955, which established an annual awards banquet to honour Manitoba's athletes as of 1956. He established the "Spirit of Christmas Fund" within the Free Press sports department in 1971, as a means to help the less fortunate in Winnipeg.

Smith retired from the Free Press on March 27, 1976, and was given a testimonial dinner attended by 300 sportsmen at the Winnipeg Inn. He was succeeded as sports editor by Hal Sigurdson, who stated that Smith talked him into returning to Winnipeg from Vancouver to be his successor.

== Personal life ==
Smith had one son and one daughter, and was a resident of the St. James neighbourhood of Winnipeg. His hobbies included golf, fishing, collecting coins and stamps. He was a Freemason and a member of lodges in Perth and Winnipeg. In retirement, he served on the selection committees of Canada's Sports Hall of Fame and the Manitoba Sports Hall of Fame and Museum.

While on vacation in Hawaii, Smith died from heart failure on February 21, 1985. His remains were cremated and returned to Winnipeg.

== Honours and legacy ==
The Manitoba Curling Association made Smith a life member in 1970. He was inducted into the Football Reporters of Canada section of the Canadian Football Hall of Fame in 1982. The MSSA established the Maurice Smith Memorial Award in December 1985, to be given to the team of the year in Manitoba sports. He was posthumously named to the honour roll of the MSSA in 1986, and inducted into the Manitoba Hockey Hall of Fame in 1987.

Hal Sigurdson felt that Smith's writing style was fair, and that he kept personal feelings and news judgment separate. Sigurdson wrote that, Smith was a humble person who did not talk about his own exploits, and the Smith regularly said he was the "luckiest guy in the world" to make a living in journalism.
