= Yarbo, Saskatchewan =

Community in Saskatchewan, Canada

Coordinates: 50°41′41″N 101°56′02″W

Location of Yarbo in Saskatchewan

Yarbo (2021 population: 48) is a special service area in the Canadian province of Saskatchewan within the Rural Municipality of Langenburg No. 181 and Census Division No. 5. Previously incorporated as a village from 1964 to 2024, Yarbo is approximately 24 kilometres (15 mi) south of the town of Churchbridge on Highway 80.

== History ==
Yarbo incorporated as a village on July 1, 1964. It dissolved to become a special service area in the Rural Municipality of Langenburg No. 181 on January 1, 2025.

== Demographics ==
Population history (1966–2021)
Year	Pop.	±%
1966	208	—
1971	160	−23.1%
1976	139	−13.1%
1981	158	+13.7%
1986	120	−24.1%
1991	135	+12.5%
1996	127	−5.9%
2001	93	−26.8%
2006	72	−22.6%
2011	53	−26.4%
2016	57	+7.5%
2021	48	−15.8%
Source: Statistics Canada via Saskatchewan Bureau of Statistics

In the 2021 Census of Population conducted by Statistics Canada, Yarbo had a population of 48 living in 25 of its 36 total private dwellings, a change of −15.8% from its 2016 population of 57. With a land area of 0.76 km^{2} (0.29 sq mi), it had a population density of 63.2/km^{2} (163.6/sq mi) in 2021.

In the 2016 Census of Population, the Village of Yarbo recorded a population of 57 living in 28 of its 38 total private dwellings, a 7% change from its 2011 population of 53. With a land area of 0.83 km^{2} (0.32 sq mi), it had a population density of 68.7/km^{2} (177.9/sq mi) in 2016.

== See also ==
- List of communities in Saskatchewan
