= Rural Municipality of Stanley No. 215 =

Rural municipality in Saskatchewan, Canada

Stanley No. 215
- Rural municipality
- Rural Municipality of Stanley No. 215
- Location of the RM of Stanley No. 215 in Saskatchewan
- Coordinates: 50.943°N 103.164°W
- Country: Canada
- Province: Saskatchewan
- Census division: 5
- SARM division: 1
- Formed: January 1, 1913

Government
  - Reeve: Max Halyk
  - Governing body: RM of Stanley No. 215 Council
  - Administrator: Dawn Oehler
  - Office location: Melville

Area (2016)
  - Land: 855.4 km^{2} (330.3 sq mi)

Population (2016)
  - Total: 505
  - Density: 0.6/km^{2} (1.6/sq mi)
- Time zone: CST
  - Summer (DST): CST
- Area codes: 306 and 639

The Rural Municipality of Stanley No. 215 (2016 population: 505) is a rural municipality (RM) in the Canadian province of Saskatchewan within Census Division No. 5 and SARM Division No. 1. It is located in the southeast portion of the province.

== History ==
The RM of Stanley No. 215 incorporated as a rural municipality on January 1, 1913.

== Geography ==
=== Communities and localities ===
The following urban municipalities are surrounded by the RM.

Cities

- Melville

The following unincorporated communities are within the RM.

Organized hamlets

- Westview

Parks and recreation

- Duff Recreation Site

== Demographics ==
Population history (1981–2016)
Year	Pop.	±%
1981	966	—
1986	915	−5.3%
1991	782	−14.5%
1996	696	−11.0%
2001	579	−16.8%
2006	509	−12.1%
2011	516	+1.4%
2016	505	−2.1%
Source: Statistics Canada via Saskatchewan Bureau of Statistics

In the 2021 Census of Population conducted by Statistics Canada, the RM of Stanley No. 215 had a population of 508 living in 196 of its 225 total private dwellings, a change of 0.6% from its 2016 population of 505. With a land area of 824.95 km^{2} (318.51 sq mi), it had a population density of 0.6/km^{2} (1.6/sq mi) in 2021.

In the 2016 Census of Population, the RM of Stanley No. 215 recorded a population of 505 living in 210 of its 240 total private dwellings, a −2.1% change from its 2011 population of 516. With a land area of 855.4 km^{2} (330.3 sq mi), it had a population density of 0.6/km^{2} (1.5/sq mi) in 2016.

== Government ==
The RM of Stanley No. 215 is governed by an elected municipal council and an appointed administrator that meets on the second Tuesday of every month. The reeve of the RM is Max Halyk while its administrator is Dawn Oehler. The RM's office is located in Melville.

== See also ==
- List of rural municipalities in Saskatchewan
