= Homefield =

Unincorporated area in Saskatchewan, Canada

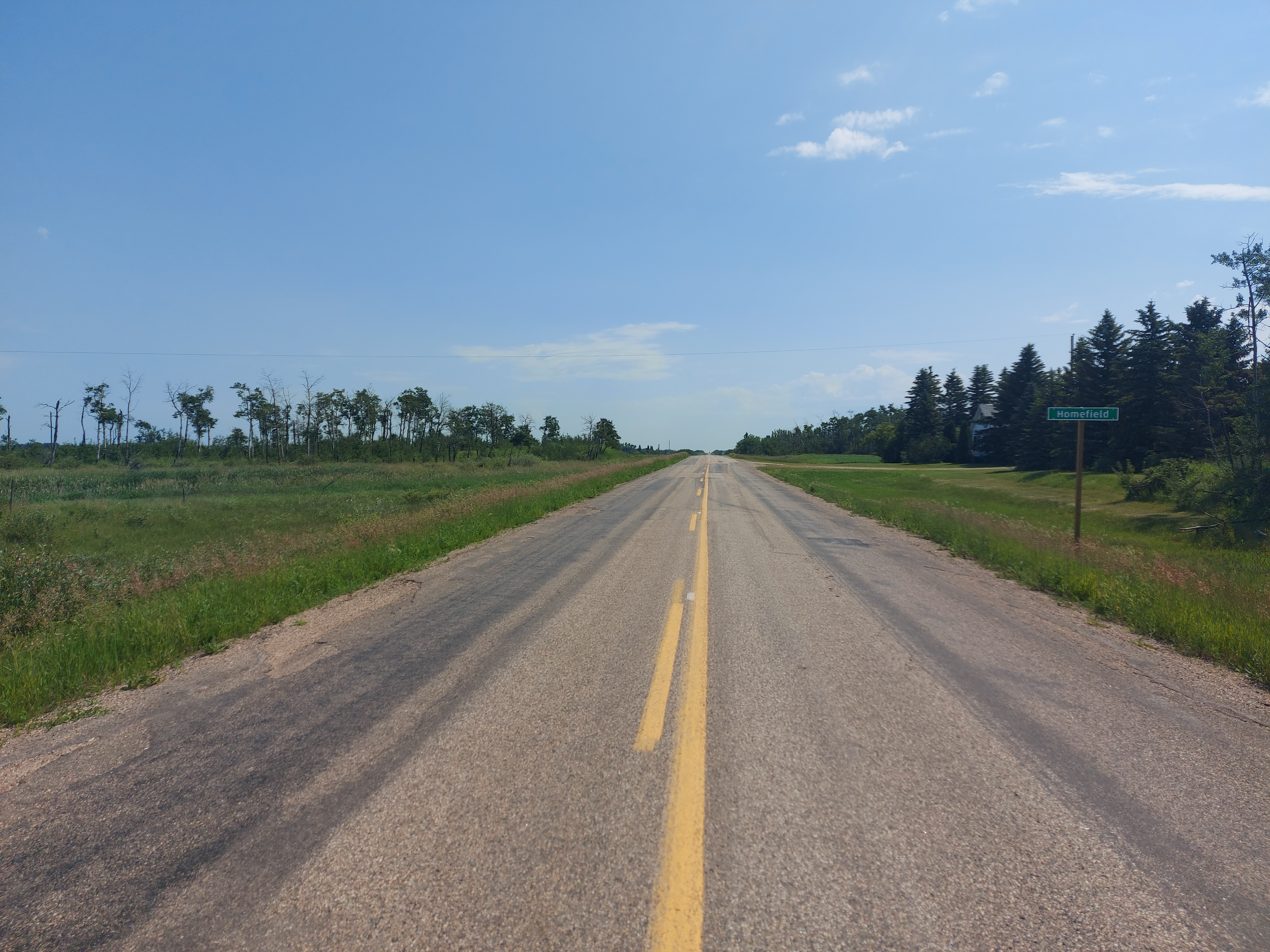
Highway 52 through Homefield

Homefield is an unincorporated area in the Rural Municipality of Garry No. 245, in the Canadian province of Saskatchewan. Homefield is located at the junction of Highway 52 and Highway 617 in eastern Saskatchewan.

== See also ==
- List of communities in Saskatchewan
- List of rural municipalities in Saskatchewan
