= Lorlie =

Community in Saskatchewan, Canada

Coordinates: 50.501°N 103.182°W

Location of Lorlie in Saskatchewan

Lorlie is a hamlet in Saskatchewan, Canada. It is situated along Highway 10.

== See also ==
- List of hamlets in Saskatchewan
