= Hal Sigurdson =

Canadian sports journalist (1932–2012)

- Born: July 1, 1932; Churchbridge, Saskatchewan, Canada
- Died: January 16, 2012 (aged 79); Winnipeg, Manitoba, Canada
- Occupation: Sports journalist
- Known for: Winnipeg Free Press; Vancouver Sun; The Albertan
- Awards: Manitoba Hockey Hall of Fame; Canadian Football Hall of Fame

Harold Bjorn Sigurdson (July 1, 1932 – January 16, 2012) was a Canadian sports journalist. He started writing for the Winnipeg Free Press in 1951, then covered the Canadian Football League as a writer, television commentator, and radio host. He became the sports editor of The Albertan in 1964, then served as the assistant sports editor of the Vancouver Sun from 1966 to 1976, where he covered the National Hockey League. He returned to Winnipeg as sports editor of the Free Press from 1976 to 1989, and reported on hockey in Manitoba and the World Hockey Association. He also wrote the "Down Memory Lane" series of sports histories, and retired in 1996. He was named to the roll of honour of the Manitoba Sportswriters and Sportscasters Association, and was inducted into the media sections of both the Manitoba Hockey Hall of Fame and the Canadian Football Hall of Fame.

== Early life ==
Harold Bjorn Sigurdson was born on July 1, 1932, in Churchbridge, Saskatchewan, and had Icelandic heritage. He grew up on the family's farm near Churchbridge, moved to Winnipeg in the 1940s, and attended Daniel McIntyre Collegiate Institute. As a youth, he played rugby football, and basketball.

== Journalism career ==
Sigurdson began working for the Winnipeg Free Press as a copy boy during the late-1940s, when the paper's sports editor, Maurice Smith, gave Sigurdson the opportunity to report on junior basketball. Sigurdson started his full-time sports writing career in 1951, and began covering Canadian football and the Winnipeg Blue Bombers in 1957. He was a frequent commentator on televised games for the Canadian Football League, and hosted radio shows on CFWM-FM and CJOB-AM in Winnipeg.

In January 1964, The Albertan named Sigurdson its sports editor, where he reported on football games for the Calgary Stampeders. He later served as the assistant sports editor of the Vancouver Sun from 1966 to 1976, and covered both the Vancouver Canucks and the National Hockey League.

Sigurdson returned to the Free Press in March 1976, to succeed Maurice Smith as the sports editor, who talked Sigurdson into returning to Winnipeg. He covered junior ice hockey and senior ice hockey in Manitoba, and the World Hockey Association. He also wrote the "Down Memory Lane" series of sports histories, and served on the Manitoba Sports Hall of Fame and Museum selection committee. He served as the sports editor until 1989, then as a sports columnist until he retired in 1996. He wrote his final sports column in the Free Press on June 28, 1996.

== Personal life ==
Sigurdson was married to Merelyn, and had two daughters and two sons. In his recreational time, he participated in curling, golf, and ten-pin bowling. He died from Alzheimer's disease on January 16, 2012, in Winnipeg, at the Saint Boniface Hospital.

== Honours and legacy ==
Sigurdson was known to his colleagues as "Siggy", and often joked that the hockey people he met over the years, spared him "the need of getting a real job". Jeff Blair described him as a good mentor, and that Sigurdson "had a real eye for detail", was "really fair" and was "a guy who stressed pride and craft". Bill Redekop described Sigurdson as "the thinking man's sportswriter, providing insight instead of outrage".

The Dow Breweries Canadian Football Reporting Awards twice gave Sigurdson an honourable mention for the best reporter in the country. He was named to the roll of honour of the Manitoba Sportswriters and Sportscasters Association in 1991. He was inducted into the media category of the Manitoba Hockey Hall of Fame in 1993, and was inducted into the Football Reporters of Canada section of the Canadian Football Hall of Fame in 1994.
