= Lionel Heinrich =

Canadian ice hockey player (1934–2014)

- Born: April 20, 1934 Churchbridge, Saskatchewan, Canada
- Died: April 21, 2014 (aged 80) Cranbrook, British Columbia, Canada
- Height: 5 ft 10 in (178 cm)
- Weight: 180 lb (82 kg; 12 st 12 lb)
- Position: Left wing
- Shot: Left
- Played for: Boston Bruins
- Playing career: 1954–1962

Lionel Grant Heinrich (April 20, 1934 – April 21, 2014) was a Canadian professional ice hockey player who played 35 games with the Boston Bruins of the National Hockey League during the 1955–56 NHL season. The rest of his career, which lasted from 1954 to 1962, was spent in various minor leagues.

== Career statistics ==
=== Regular season and playoffs ===
			Regular season					Playoffs
Season	Team	League	GP	G	A	Pts	PIM	GP	G	A	Pts	PIM
1951–52	Humboldt Indians	SJHL	45	3	3	6	65	10	1	1	2	12
1952–53	Humboldt Indians	SJHL	27	10	11	21	92	10	3	2	5	12
1953–54	Humboldt Indians	SJHL	42	19	21	40	96	5	2	1	3	4
1953–54	Melville Millionaires	SSHL	2	1	0	1	0	9	3	4	7	17
1954–55	Hershey Bears	AHL	54	8	15	23	45	—	—	—	—	—
1955–56	Boston Bruins	NHL	35	1	1	2	33	—	—	—	—	—
1955–56	Hershey Bears	AHL	15	0	1	1	22	—	—	—	—	—
1956–57	Vancouver Canucks	WHL	69	2	11	13	96	3	1	0	1	9
1957–58	Quebec Aces	QHL	4	0	1	1	10	—	—	—	—	—
1957–58	Windsor Bulldogs	OHA Sr	43	5	9	14	64	—	—	—	—	—
1958–59	Regina Capitals	SSHL	9	0	3	3	10	7	0	3	3	18
1959–60	Regina Capitals	SSHL	3	0	1	1	35	—	—	—	—	—
1961–62	Regina Capitals	SSHL	3	0	1	1	0	—	—	—	—	—
NHL totals			35	1	1	2	33	—	—	—	—	—
