= Rokeby, Saskatchewan =

Hamlet in Saskatchewan, Canada

Rokeby is a hamlet in Saskatchewan, Canada.

Rokeby is located 10 km southeast of Yorkton and 11.3 km northwest of Saltcoats.

Rokeby lies along the south side of the Yellowhead Highway and is easily recognized by its white Community Hall, where ski-goers often gather in the winter before heading on a day-long derby tour. It is part of the Rural Municipality of Wallace No. 243.

== See also ==
- List of communities in Saskatchewan
