= Rock Dell, Saskatchewan =

Rock Dell
- Unincorporated area
- Interactive map of Rock Dell
- Coordinates: 51°10′51″N 102°53′45″W
- Country: Canada
- Province: Saskatchewan
- Elevation: 565 m (1,854 ft)
- Time zone: UTC−6 (CST)

Rock Dell is an unincorporated area in the rural municipality of Garry No. 245, in the Canadian province of Saskatchewan. Rock Dell is located approximately 5 kilometres (3.1 mi) south of Highway 52 on Range road 74 in eastern Saskatchewan.

== See also ==
- List of communities in Saskatchewan
- List of rural municipalities in Saskatchewan
