= Rural Municipality of Garry No. 245 =

Rural municipality in Saskatchewan, Canada

Garry No. 245
- Rural municipality
- Rural Municipality of Garry No. 245
- Location of the RM of Garry No. 245 in Saskatchewan
- Coordinates: 51.254°N 103.063°W
- Country: Canada
- Province: Saskatchewan
- Census division: 9
- SARM division: 4
- Formed: January 1, 1913

Government
  - Reeve: Allan Polegi
  - Governing body: RM of Garry No. 245 Council
  - Administrator: Tanis Ferguson
  - Office location: Jedburgh

Area (2016)
  - Land: 853.59 km^{2} (329.57 sq mi)

Population (2016)
  - Total: 364
  - Density: 0.4/km^{2} (1.0/sq mi)
- Time zone: CST
  - Summer (DST): CST
- Area codes: 306 and 639

The Rural Municipality of Garry No. 245 (2016 population: 364) is a rural municipality (RM) in the Canadian province of Saskatchewan within Census Division No. 9 and SARM Division No. 4.

== History ==
The RM of Garry No. 245 incorporated as a rural municipality on January 1, 1913.

== Geography ==
=== Communities and localities ===
The following unincorporated communities are within the RM.

Localities

- Beaver Dale
- Fitzmaurice
- Homefield
- Jedburgh
- Parkerview
- Rock Dell

== Demographics ==
Population history (1981–2016)
Year	Pop.	±%
1981	818	—
1986	728	−11.0%
1991	682	−6.3%
1996	565	−17.2%
2001	514	−9.0%
2006	426	−17.1%
2011	412	−3.3%
2016	364	−11.7%
Source: Statistics Canada via Saskatchewan Bureau of Statistics

In the 2021 Census of Population conducted by Statistics Canada, the RM of Garry No. 245 had a population of 370 living in 152 of its 175 total private dwellings, a change of 1.6% from its 2016 population of 364. With a land area of 790.2 km^{2} (305.1 sq mi), it had a population density of 0.5/km^{2} (1.2/sq mi) in 2021.

In the 2016 Census of Population, the RM of Garry No. 245 recorded a population of 364 living in 141 of its 146 total private dwellings, a −11.7% change from its 2011 population of 412. With a land area of 853.59 km^{2} (329.57 sq mi), it had a population density of 0.4/km^{2} (1.1/sq mi) in 2016.

== Government ==
The RM of Garry No. 245 is governed by an elected municipal council and an appointed administrator that meets on the second Tuesday of every month. The reeve of the RM is Allan Polegi while its administrator is Tanis Ferguson. The RM's office is located in Jedburgh.

== Transportation ==
- Highway 52
- Highway 617

== See also ==
- List of rural municipalities in Saskatchewan
