= Duff, Saskatchewan =

Community in Saskatchewan, Canada

Duff
- Special service area
- Location of Duff in Saskatchewan Duff (Canada)
- Coordinates: 50.874°N 103.092°W
- Country: Canada
- Province: Saskatchewan
- Region: Southeast
- Census division: 5
- Rural municipality: Stanley No. 215
- Incorporated (village): May 28, 1920
- Dissolved (special service area): January 1, 2022

Area
  - Total: 0.22 km^{2} (0.085 sq mi)

Population (2016)
  - Total: 30
  - Density: 139.1/km^{2} (360/sq mi)
- Time zone: UTC-6 (CST)
- Postal code: S0A 0S0
- Area code: 306
- Highways: Highway 10

Duff (2016 population: 30) is a special service area in the Canadian province of Saskatchewan within the Rural Municipality of Stanley No. 215 and Census Division No. 5. It is approximately 122 kilometres (76 mi) north-east of the city of Regina, 66 kilometres (41 mi) south-west of Yorkton, and 20 kilometres (12 mi) west of Melville. The community is situated along Highway 10.

== History ==
Duff incorporated as a village on May 28, 1920. It dissolved its village status on January 1, 2022 in favour of becoming a special service area in the RM of Stanley No. 215.

== Demographics ==
Population history (1981–2016)
Year	Pop.	±%
1981	76	—
1986	74	−2.6%
1991	52	−29.7%
1996	43	−17.3%
2001	40	−7.0%
2006	30	−25.0%
2011	30	+0.0%
2016	30	+0.0%
Source: Statistics Canada via Saskatchewan Bureau of Statistics

In the 2021 Census of Population conducted by Statistics Canada, Duff had a population of 25 living in 9 of its 16 total private dwellings, a change of −16.7% from its 2016 population of 30. With a land area of 0.27 km^{2} (0.10 sq mi), it had a population density of 92.6/km^{2} (239.8/sq mi) in 2021.

In the 2016 Census of Population conducted by Statistics Canada, Duff recorded a population of 30 living in 16 of its 23 total private dwellings, a 0% change from its 2011 population of 30. With a land area of 0.22 km^{2} (0.085 sq mi), it had a population density of 136.4/km^{2} (353.2/sq mi) in 2016.

== Parks and recreation ==
About 3 kilometres (2 mi) east along the south side of Highway 10 is the Duff Provincial Recreation Site (50.8806°N 103.0463°W). It is a conservation area on Pearl Creek at an elevation of 580 metres (1,900 ft).

== See also ==
- List of communities in Saskatchewan
- List of special service areas in Saskatchewan
