= Willowbrook, Saskatchewan =

Special service area in Saskatchewan, Canada

Coordinates: 51°12′15″N 102°48′07″W

Location of Willowbrook in Saskatchewan

Willowbrook is a special service area in the Rural Municipality of Orkney No. 244, Saskatchewan, Canada, that was incorporated as a village prior to July 31, 2008. The community is located 30 km north of the city of Melville at the intersection of Highway 47 and Highway 52.

== Demographics ==
In the 2021 Census of Population conducted by Statistics Canada, Willowbrook had a population of 30 living in 15 of its 17 total private dwellings, a change of -18.9% from its 2016 population of 37. With a land area of 0.46 km^{2} (0.18 sq mi), it had a population density of 65.2/km^{2} (168.9/sq mi) in 2021.

== See also ==
- List of communities in Saskatchewan
