= Rural Municipality of Wallace No. 243 =

Rural municipality in Saskatchewan, Canada

Wallace No. 243
- Rural municipality
- Rural Municipality of Wallace No. 243
- Location of the RM of Wallace No. 243 in Saskatchewan
- Coordinates: 51.279°N 102.232°W
- Country: Canada
- Province: Saskatchewan
- Census division: 9
- SARM division: 4
- Formed: December 11, 1911

Government
  - Reeve: Garry Liebrecht
  - Governing body: RM of Wallace No. 243 Council
  - Administrator: Lynne Hewitt
  - Office location: Yorkton

Area (2016)
  - Land: 830.24 km^{2} (320.56 sq mi)

Population (2016)
  - Total: 852
  - Density: 1/km^{2} (2.6/sq mi)
- Time zone: CST
  - Summer (DST): CST
- Area codes: 306 and 639
- Website: Official website

The Rural Municipality of Wallace No. 243 (2016 population: 852) is a rural municipality (RM) in the Canadian province of Saskatchewan within Census Division No. 9 and SARM Division No. 4. It is located in the east-central portion of the province.

== History ==
The RM of Wallace No. 243 incorporated as a rural municipality on December 11, 1911.

== Geography ==
=== Communities and localities ===
The following urban municipalities are surrounded by the RM.

Villages

- Rhein

The following unincorporated communities are within the RM.

Special service areas

- Stornoway

Localities

- Barvas
- Calley
- Chrysler
- Dunleath
- Kessock
- Rokeby
- Tonkin

== Demographics ==
Population history (1981–2016)
Year	Pop.	±%
1981	1,158	—
1986	1,138	−1.7%
1991	1,051	−7.6%
1996	1,044	−0.7%
2001	955	−8.5%
2006	901	−5.7%
2011	879	−2.4%
2016	852	−3.1%
Source: Statistics Canada via Saskatchewan Bureau of Statistics

In the 2021 Census of Population conducted by Statistics Canada, the RM of Wallace No. 243 had a population of 881 living in 350 of its 387 total private dwellings, a change of 3.4% from its 2016 population of 852. With a land area of 814.69 km^{2} (314.55 sq mi), it had a population density of 1.1/km^{2} (2.8/sq mi) in 2021.

In the 2016 Census of Population, the RM of Wallace No. 243 recorded a population of 852 living in 347 of its 399 total private dwellings, a −3.1% change from its 2011 population of 879. With a land area of 830.24 km^{2} (320.56 sq mi), it had a population density of 1.0/km^{2} (2.7/sq mi) in 2016.

== Government ==
The RM of Wallace No. 243 is governed by an elected municipal council and an appointed administrator that meets on the second Friday of every month. The reeve of the RM is Garry Liebrecht while its administrator is Gerry Burym. The RM's office is located in Yorkton.

== See also ==
- List of rural municipalities in Saskatchewan
