= Churchbridge, Saskatchewan =

Town in Saskatchewan, Canada

Churchbridge
- Location within Saskatchewan
- Coordinates: 50°53′41″N 101°53′36″W
- Country: Canada
- Province: Saskatchewan
- Rural Municipality: Churchbridge No. 211
- Post office, NWT: 1 April 1889
- Village Incoporporated: 1903
- Town incorporated: 1964

Government
  - Mayor: Jared Melnyk
  - Federal Electoral District M.P.: Cathay Wagantall
  - provincial electoral districts M.L.A.: Warren Kaeding

Area (2021)
  - Land: 2.57 km^{2} (0.99 sq mi)

Population (2021)
  - Total: 866
  - Density: 336.9/km^{2} (873/sq mi)
- Time zone: UTC−06:00 (CST)
- Postal code: S0A 0M0
- Area code: 306
- Website: http://www.churchbridge.com/

Churchbridge is a town in the province of Saskatchewan, Canada, located at the junction of the Yellowhead Highway (Highway 16), and Highway 80. Churchbridge is a part of the Rural Municipality of Churchbridge No. 211, which is located within Saskatchewan Association of Rural Municipalities (SARM) Division No. 1 and census division Number 5.

== History ==
Churchbridge began with the arrival of settlers from the Anglican Colonization Society, with director and missionary Reverend Robert Bridger.

The village of Churchbridge was incorporated in 1903 with James Heasman as the overseer. He was solely responsible for the affairs of the village. There was no council, but M. Thorlakson and A.O. Berger, both hotel keepers, were trustees, which meant they made themselves responsible for the honesty and integrity of the overseer in his financial duties. In 1962, there were 260 people residing the village, and by 1964, the population had risen to 600. The village became a town in 1964.

== Geography ==
Churchbridge is north of Big Cut Arm Creek and Deer Creek which drain into the Assiniboine River.

== Demographics ==
In the 2021 Canadian census conducted by Statistics Canada, Churchbridge had a population of 866 living in 392 of its 427 total private dwellings, a change of −3.3% from its 2016 population of 896. With a land area of 2.57 km^{2} (0.99 sq mi), it had a population density of 337.0/km^{2} (872.7/sq mi) in 2021.

Canada census – Churchbridge community profile

	2021	2011
Population	866 (-3.3% from 2016)	743 (+5.5% from 2006)
Land area	2.57 km^{2} (0.99 sq mi)	2.76 km^{2} (1.07 sq mi)
Population density	336.9/km^{2} (873/sq mi)	269.2/km^{2} (697/sq mi)
Median age	38.0 (M: 36.4, F: 40.8)	45.8 (M: 43.7, F: 47.6)
Private dwellings	427 (total) 392 (occupied)	374 (total)
Median household income	$87,000

References: 2021 2011

== Economy ==
Churchbridge is a community with an excellent location along Highway 16 for business. The Mosaic Potash mines to the south of employ many residents of Churchbridge and surrounding area, including nearby towns Esterhazy, Langenburg, and Bredenbury.

== Amenities ==
Over the years Churchbridge has grown. The community has a kindergarten to grade 12 school, the Churchbridge Public School that is in the Good Spirit School Division No. 204, a library, a fire department, a daycare, and recreation facilities (including a new swimming pool).

== Sites of interest ==
Sites of interest in the town include the Coin Monument erected to celebrate the 125th anniversary of Canadian Confederation, Veteran's Memorial Wall, photo archives and the many heritage murals displayed throughout the community. These displays of art were created by local artists to help commemorate various events, as well as to honour former residents.

Duck Mountain Provincial Park is north on Highway 80; Asessippi Ski Area and Lake of the Prairies just east on Highway 16.

Churchbridge Campground is south of the junction of Highway 16 and 80. The campground offers 33 sites — 29 electrified, pull through sites, grass covered sites for tents, sewer dump, washroom and shower facility. Across the road is a picnic area, swimming pool, playground, and ball diamonds.

The Saltcoats Game Preserve is within 19 kilometres (12 mi).

== Transportation ==
Churchbridge Airport supplies limited air service to this Saskatchewan town. The main mode of transportation would be via Saskatchewan Highway 16, the Yellowhead Route, and to a lesser extent via the north/south secondary highway, Highway 80.

As of the early 1900s, Churchbridge was a part of the Minnedosa, Saskatoon, Edmonton section of the Canadian Pacific Railway.

== Publications ==
A local history and family biography book written for the province's 75th anniversary by Ruth Swanson and published by the Churchbridge History Committee and is entitled: The first hundred years: around Churchbridge, 1880-1980.

== Media ==
The Four-Town Journal newspaper covers Churchbridge and its surrounding area. The Company was established by Bill Johnston in 1980 and was purchased by Ryan Stanko in 2019.

== Notable people ==
- Darleen Bogart, Braille literacy advocate
- Lionel G. Heinrich, professional Canadian ice hockey player.
- Kevin S. Kaminski, professional Canadian ice hockey player.
- Hal Sigurdson, sports journalist

== See also ==
- List of communities in Saskatchewan
