= Parkerview =

Locality in Saskatchewan, Canada

Parkerview is an unincorporated locality in the Rural Municipality of Garry No. 245, in the Canadian province of Saskatchewan. Parkerview is located on Highway 617 at the junction of Township Road 275 in eastern Saskatchewan.

== See also ==
- List of communities in Saskatchewan
