= Esterhazy, Saskatchewan =

Town in Saskatchewan, Canada

Town of Esterhazy
- Town
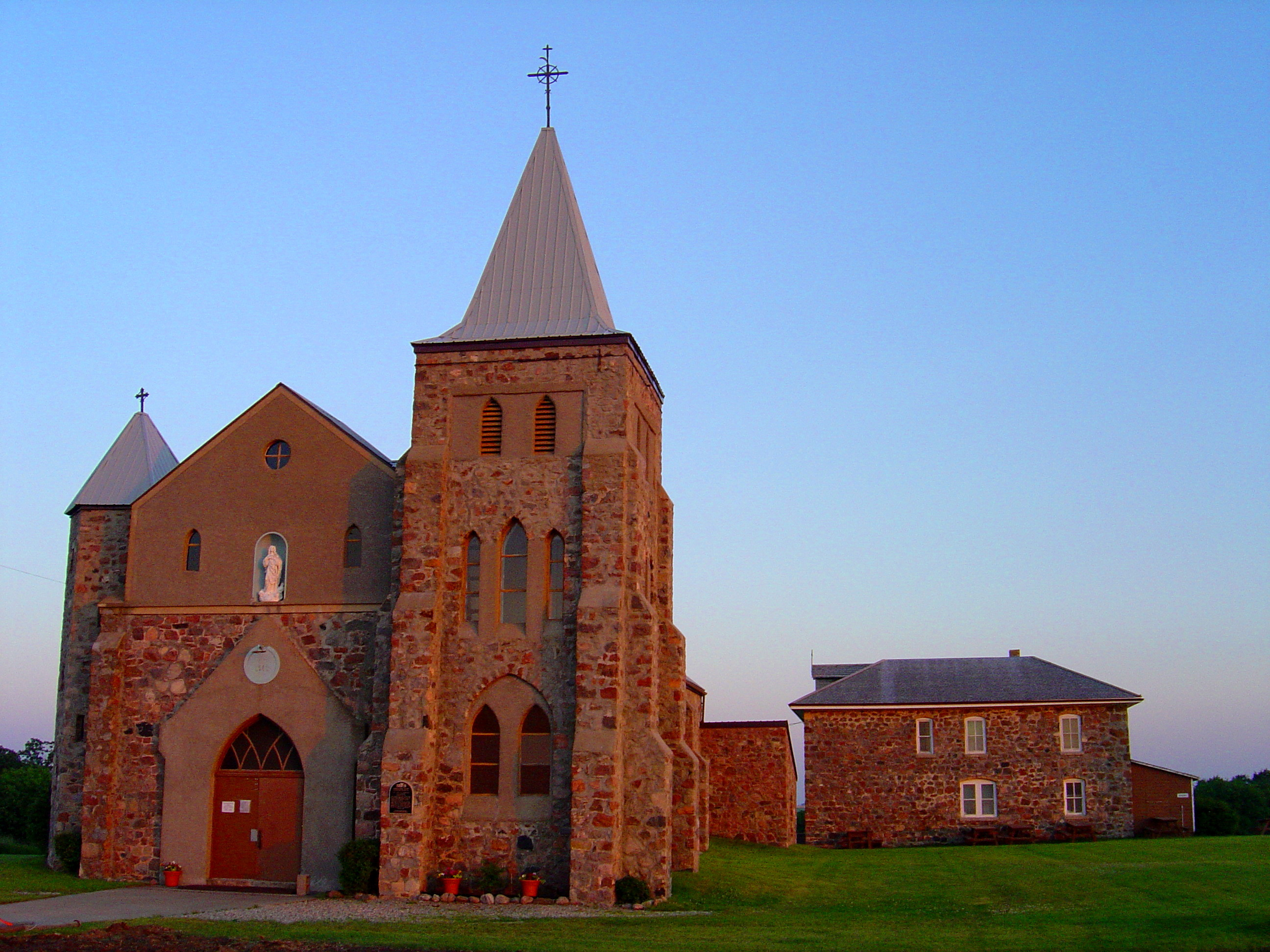
- Our Lady of Assumption Roman Catholic Church in Esterhazy

- Flag
- Nickname: Potash Capital of the World
- Location within Saskatchewan
- Coordinates: 50°39′N 102°4′W
- Country: Canada
- Province: Saskatchewan
- Post office opened: 1903

Government
  - Type: Town Council
  - Mayor: Randy Bot
  - Administrator: Mike Thorley

Area
  - Total: 4.75 km^{2} (1.83 sq mi)

Population
  - Total: 2,472
  - Density: 520.9/km^{2} (1,349/sq mi)
- Time zone: UTC-6 (Central Standard Time)
- Postal Code: S0A 0X0
- Area code: 306
- Highways: Highway 22 / Highway 80 / Highway 637
- Website: townofesterhazy.ca - Official Web Site

Esterhazy is a town in the south-eastern part of the Canadian province of Saskatchewan, 83 kilometres (52 mi) south-east of Yorkton along Highways 22 and 80. The town is in the Rural Municipality of Fertile Belt No. 183.

== History ==
Esterhazy is reputed to be named for Count Paul Otto d'Esterhazy, an immigrant agent who was christened Johannes Packh, but at age 35 claimed he had "incontrovertible proof" that he was a Hungarian aristocrat of the Esterházy family. This claim was never recognized by the Esterházy family, one of the wealthiest families in Hungary.

A year after making his claim, he immigrated to Saskatchewan, south of the current location of the town of Esterhazy, and in 1886 helped settle 35 Hungarian families, founding the colony of Kaposvar, named after the Hungarian city Kaposvár.

The colony flourished, and many more immigrants settled the area as the years went by. In 1905 the town of Esterhazy was officially founded.

The area that is now the township of Esterhazy was first settled by English settlers in 1882, who founded Sumner Parish in the north. Later colonies included the Swedes to the west, Czechs to the southwest, northeast a German colony, northwest a Welsh one, and a Jewish settlement in the southeast, near Wapella, Saskatchewan.

In 1962, IMC Global (now Mosaic), a mining company, completed the shaft for a potash mine, and today the two joint mines, K1 and K2, combined produce more potash than any other mine in the world, granting Esterhazy the title of "Potash capital of the world."

=== Historic sites ===
On July 8, 2009 the Esterhazy Flour Mill was designated as a national historic site of Canada, and is one of 45 Saskatchewan National Historic Sites. The plaque commemorating the national historic site designation was unveiled on September 3, 2011. Garry Breitkreuz, Member of Parliament for Yorkton—Melville unveiled the plaque on behalf of Peter Kent, Canada's Minister of the Environment and Minister responsible for Parks Canada.

Our Lady of Assumption Roman Catholic Church, also known as Kaposvar Church, was built in 1906-1907 by Brothers of Father Jules Pirot with Hungarian farmers hauling stones from the surrounding area. A large stone church, today it is the home of the Kaposvar Historic Site and Museum. This church is on a very well kept site, where tours of the church can be taken.

== Demographics ==
In the 2021 Canadian census conducted by Statistics Canada, Esterhazy had a population of 2,345 living in 1,068 of its 1,358 total private dwellings, a change of −6.3% from its 2016 population of 2,502. With a land area of 5.56 km^{2} (2.15 sq mi), it had a population density of 421.8/km^{2} (1,092.4/sq mi) in 2021.

== Esterhazy Regional Park ==
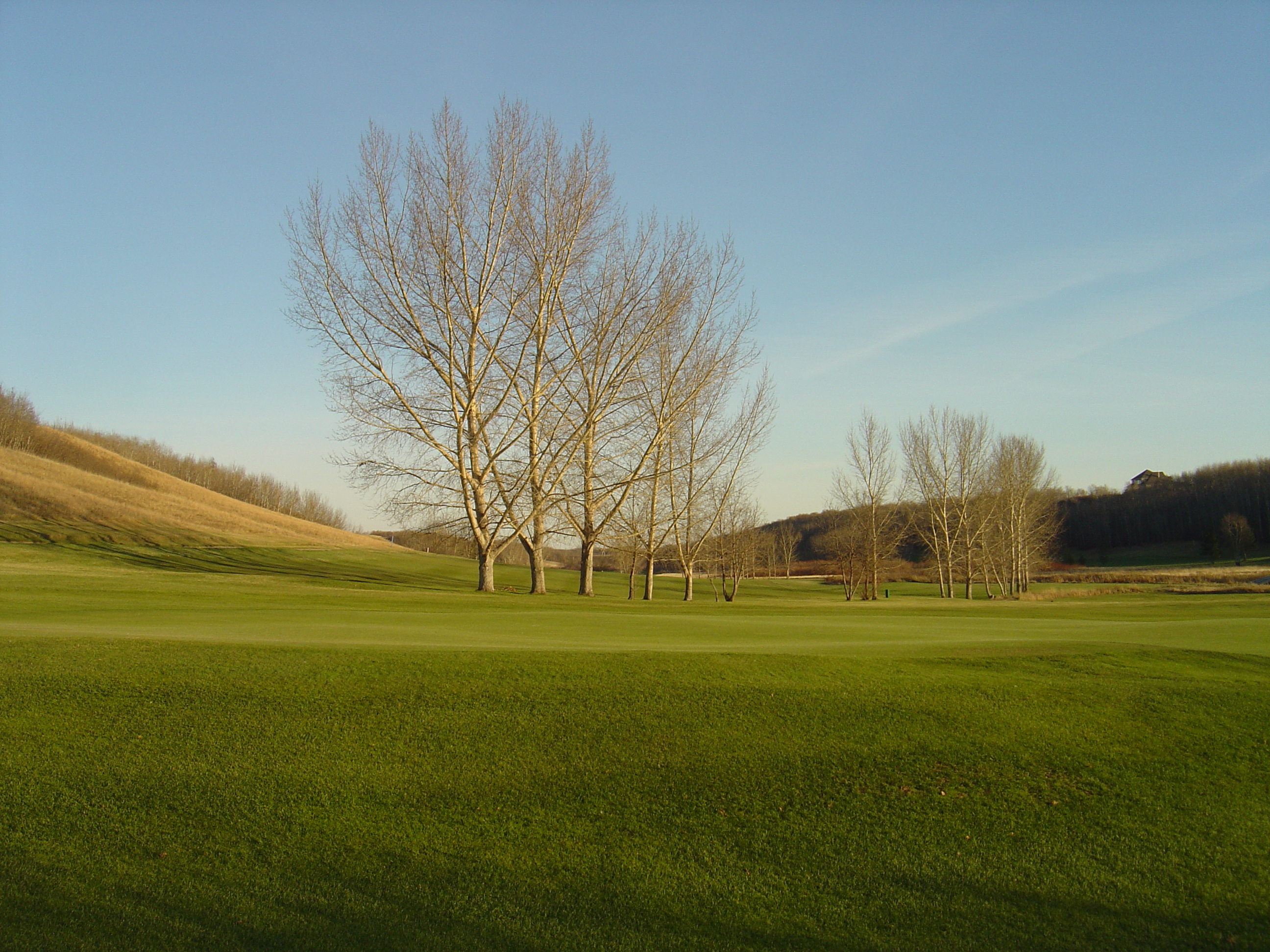
Esterhazy Golf and Country Club

Esterhazy Regional Park (50.6583°N 102.0588°W) is located on the eastern side of Esterhazy along the banks of the Kaposvar Creek. Founded in 1984, it was the 100th regional park established in Saskatchewan. The park has a campground, 9-hole golf course, ball diamonds, cross-country ski trails, and hiking trails.

The campground has 32 electric campsites, potable water, showers, and washrooms. The golf course has grass greens, is a par 34, and has a total of 2,834 yards.

== Education ==
Esterhazy High School and P. J. Gillen School are in the Good Spirit School Division.

Students from the nearby communities of Tantallon, Atwater, Yarbo, and Gerald also attend school in Esterhazy.

== Media ==
Newspaper

- The World-Spectator community newspaper www.world-spectator.com
- Plain and Valley regional newspaper www.plainandvalley.com
- The Four-Town Journal - print and digital newspaper
- EsterhazyOnline - online newspaper

Radio

- CJEZ-FM 99.5 - Esterhazy's first and newest local radio station. Launch date to be announced

== Notable people ==
- Rockford 2001, professional wrestler
- Dana Antal, Canadian National Women's Hockey Player, Olympic Gold Medal winner
- Chris Herperger, retired NHL hockey player
- Corey Tochor, current MP, Saskatoon University, former MLA Saskatoon Eastview, former Speaker of the House of the Saskatchewan Legislature
- Guy Vanderhaeghe, writer

== See also ==
- List of towns in Saskatchewan
- List of communities in Saskatchewan
- Esterhazy Airport
- Tabor Light
