= Rural Municipality of Churchbridge No. 211 =

Rural municipality in Saskatchewan, Canada

Churchbridge No. 211
- Rural municipality
- Rural Municipality of Churchbridge No. 211
- Location of the RM of Churchbridge No. 211 in Saskatchewan
- Coordinates: 50.999°N 101.751°W
- Country: Canada
- Province: Saskatchewan
- Census division: 5
- SARM division: 1
- Formed: January 1, 1913

Government
  - Reeve: Neil Mehrer
  - Governing body: RM of Churchbridge No. 211 Council
  - Administrator: Brenda Goulden
  - Office location: Churchbridge

Area (2016)
  - Land: 958.57 km^{2} (370.11 sq mi)

Population (2016)
  - Total: 619
  - Density: 0.6/km^{2} (1.6/sq mi)
- Time zone: CST
  - Summer (DST): CST
- Area codes: 306 and 639

The Rural Municipality of Churchbridge No. 211 (2016 population: 619) is a rural municipality (RM) in the Canadian province of Saskatchewan within Census Division No. 5 and SARM Division No. 1. It is located in the east-central portion of the province.

== History ==
The RM of Churchbridge No. 211 incorporated as a rural municipality on January 1, 1913.

== Geography ==
=== Communities and localities ===
The following urban municipalities are surrounded by the RM.

Towns

- Churchbridge

Villages

- MacNutt

The following unincorporated communities are within the RM.

Localities

- Beresina

== Demographics ==
Population history (1981–2016)
Year	Pop.	±%
1981	1,173	—
1986	1,100	−6.2%
1991	1,015	−7.7%
1996	876	−13.7%
2001	772	−11.9%
2006	679	−12.0%
2011	673	−0.9%
2016	619	−8.0%
Source: Statistics Canada via Saskatchewan Bureau of Statistics

In the 2021 Census of Population conducted by Statistics Canada, the RM of Churchbridge No. 211 had a population of 584 living in 235 of its 273 total private dwellings, a change of −5.7% from its 2016 population of 619. With a land area of 899.13 km^{2} (347.16 sq mi), it had a population density of 0.6/km^{2} (1.7/sq mi) in 2021.

In the 2016 Census of Population, the RM of Churchbridge No. 211 recorded a population of 619 living in 240 of its 268 total private dwellings, a −8% change from its 2011 population of 673. With a land area of 958.57 km^{2} (370.11 sq mi), it had a population density of 0.6/km^{2} (1.7/sq mi) in 2016.

== Government ==
The RM of Churchbridge No. 211 is governed by an elected municipal council and an appointed administrator that meets on the second Tuesday of every month. The reeve of the RM is Neil Mehrer while its administrator is Brenda Goulden. The RM's office is located in Churchbridge.
