= Saskatchewan Highway 52 =

Provincial highway in Saskatchewan, Canada

Highway 52
- Highway 52 highlighted in red and Highway 52A highlighted in blue
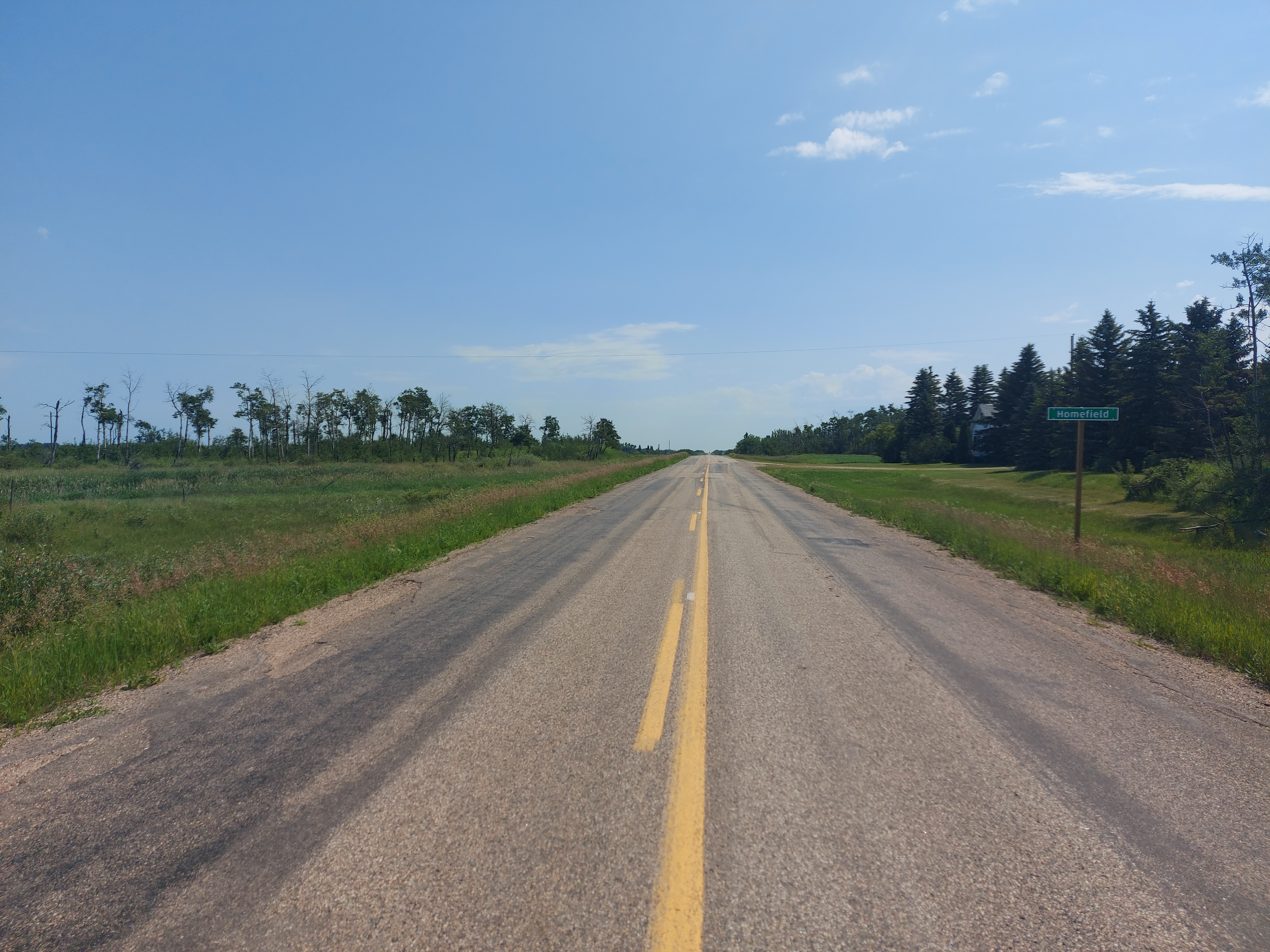
- Highway 52 at Homefield

Route information
- Maintained by Ministry of Highways and Infrastructure
- Length: 70.4 km (43.7 mi)

Major junctions
- West end: Highway 15 / Highway 310 near Ituna
- Highway 47 near Willowbrook
- East end: Highway 10A in Yorkton

Location
- Country: Canada
- Province: Saskatchewan
- Rural municipalities: Ituna Bon Accord No. 246, Garry No. 245, Orkney No. 244
- Major cities: Yorkton

Highway system
- Provincial highways in Saskatchewan
← Highway 51	→ Highway 54

Highway 52 is a provincial highway in the Canadian province of Saskatchewan. The highway runs from Highway 15 / Highway 310 near Ituna to Highway 10A in Yorkton near Pleasant Heights. It is about 70 kilometres (43 mi) long.

Highway 52 connects with Highways 617, 651, and 47. It also carries a short concurrency with Highway 310 for 1.6 km (1.0 mi) to its western terminus; Highway 310 continues its concurrency with Highway 15 south of the junction. The communities of Homefield, Willowbrook, Fonehill, Vanstone, and Collacott are near the highway between Highway 15 and Yorkton.

== History ==
The section of Highway 52 between Yorkton and Willowbrook was originally part of Highway 10, which then continued south to Melville along present-day Highway 47. The designation was changed when a more direct highway was constructed in the 1960s.

== Major intersections ==
From west to east:

Rural municipality	Location	km	mi	Destinations	Notes
Ituna Bon Accord No. 246		0.0	0.0	Highway 15 / Highway 310 south – Raymore, Ituna	West end of Highway 310 concurrency
Ituna Bon Accord No. 246		1.6	0.99	Highway 310 north – Foam Lake	East end of Highway 310 concurrency
Garry No. 245	Homefield	18.0	11.2	Highway 617 – Sheho, Goodeve	
Garry No. 245		34.2	21.3	Range Road 2081 – Jedburgh	Former Highway 651 north
Orkney No. 244	Willowbrook	48.9	30.4	Highway 47 – Springside, Melville	
Orkney No. 244		66.1	41.1	Highway 52A north (Yorkton West Truck Route)	
City of Yorkton		70.4	43.7	Highway 10A – City Centre, Melville, Regina	
1.000 mi = 1.609 km; 1.000 km = 0.621 mi: Concurrency terminus

== Highway 52A ==
Highway 52A
- Location: Orkney No. 244
- Length: 3.1 km (1.9 mi)
- Existed: 2012–present

Highway 52A runs from Highway 52 to Highway 16 along the western edge of Yorkton. It is about 3.1 kilometres (1.9 mi) long and was commissioned in 2012 as part of the Yorkton West Truck Route Project, which runs along the western edge of Yorkton.

Major Intersections

The entire route is in the Rural Municipality of Orkney No. 244.

Location	km	mi	Destinations	Notes
	0.0	0.0	Highway 52 – Yorkton, Ituna	Southern terminus
	3.1	1.9	Highway 16 (TCH/YH) – Saskatoon, Yorkton Grain Millers Drive to Highway 9 north – Canora	Northern terminus; road continues north as Grain Millers Drive
1.000 mi = 1.609 km; 1.000 km = 0.621 mi

== See also ==
- Transportation in Saskatchewan
- Roads in Saskatchewan
