= Wroxton, Saskatchewan =

Community in Saskatchewan, Canada

Coordinates: 51°13′24″N 101°53′04″W

Location of Wroxton in Saskatchewan

Wroxton is an unincorporated community in Saskatchewan, located 41 kilometres (25 mi) east of Yorkton, 40 kilometres (25 mi) west of Roblin, Manitoba, and 42 kilometres (26 mi) south of Kamsack at the intersection of Highway 8 and Highway 10.

It is the seat of the Rural Municipality of Calder No. 241 in the Census Division 9.

== History ==
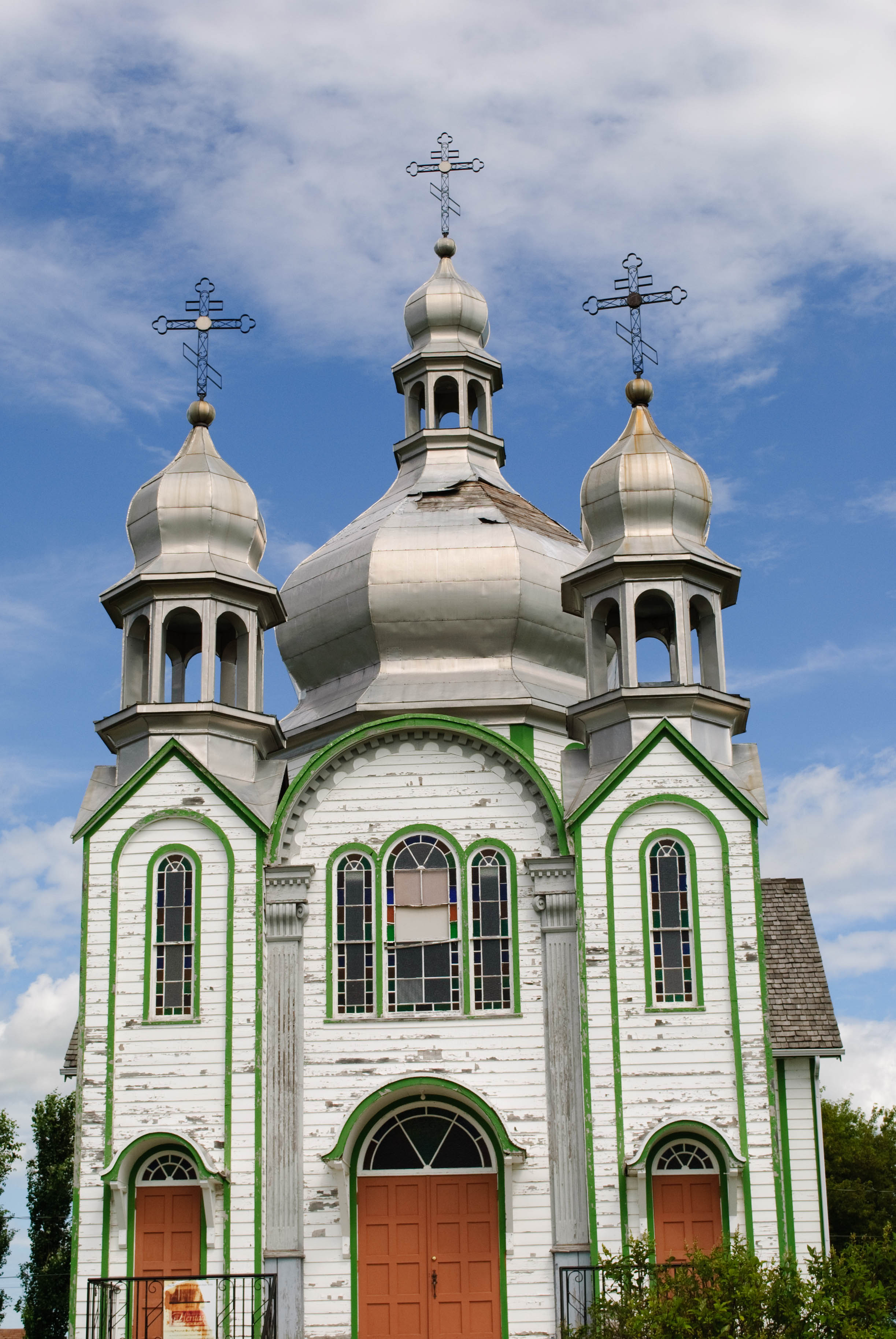
St. Elia Church

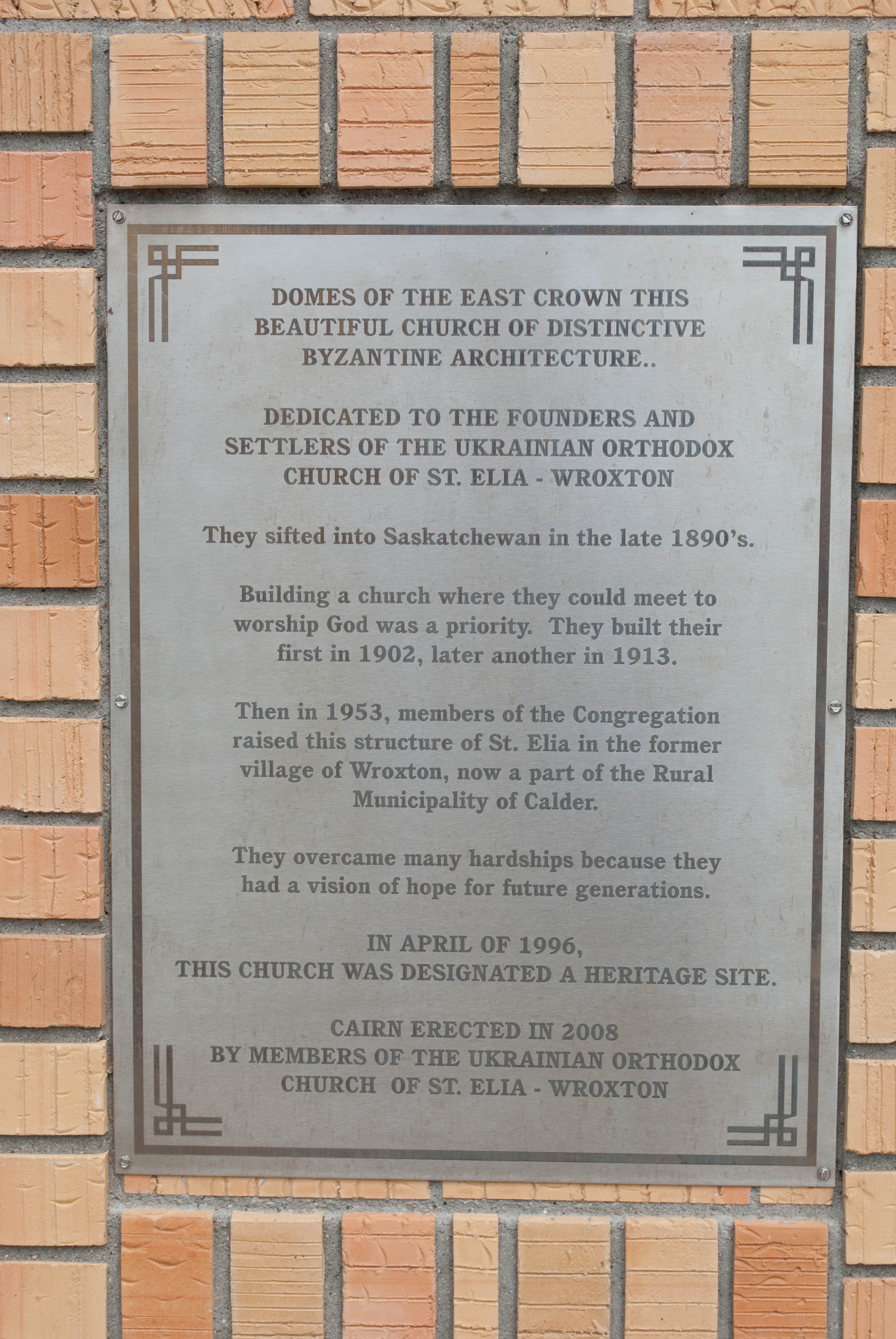
Church Plaque

Wroxton is home to the Ukrainian Orthodox Church of St. Elia, a cultural heritage site of Canada, number 3591 in the Canadian Register of Historic Places.

A post office was opened in Wroxton in 1911. It was named for Wroxton in Oxfordshire, England.

== See also ==
- List of communities in Saskatchewan
