= Westview, Saskatchewan =

Community in Saskatchewan, Canada

Coordinates: 50°55′54″N 102°51′36″W

Westview is a hamlet in the Canadian province of Saskatchewan. It lies adjacent to the west side of the city of Melville along Highway 740.

== Demographics ==
In the 2021 Census of Population conducted by Statistics Canada, Westview had a population of 53 living in 19 of its 21 total private dwellings, a change of 17.8% from its 2016 population of 45. With a land area of 0.39 km^{2} (0.15 sq mi), it had a population density of 135.9/km^{2} (352.0/sq mi) in 2021.

== See also ==
- List of communities in Saskatchewan
