= Asessippi Ski Area =

Ski resort in Manitoba, Canada

Coordinates: 50°57′04″N 101°20′21″W

Asessippi Ski Area & Resort

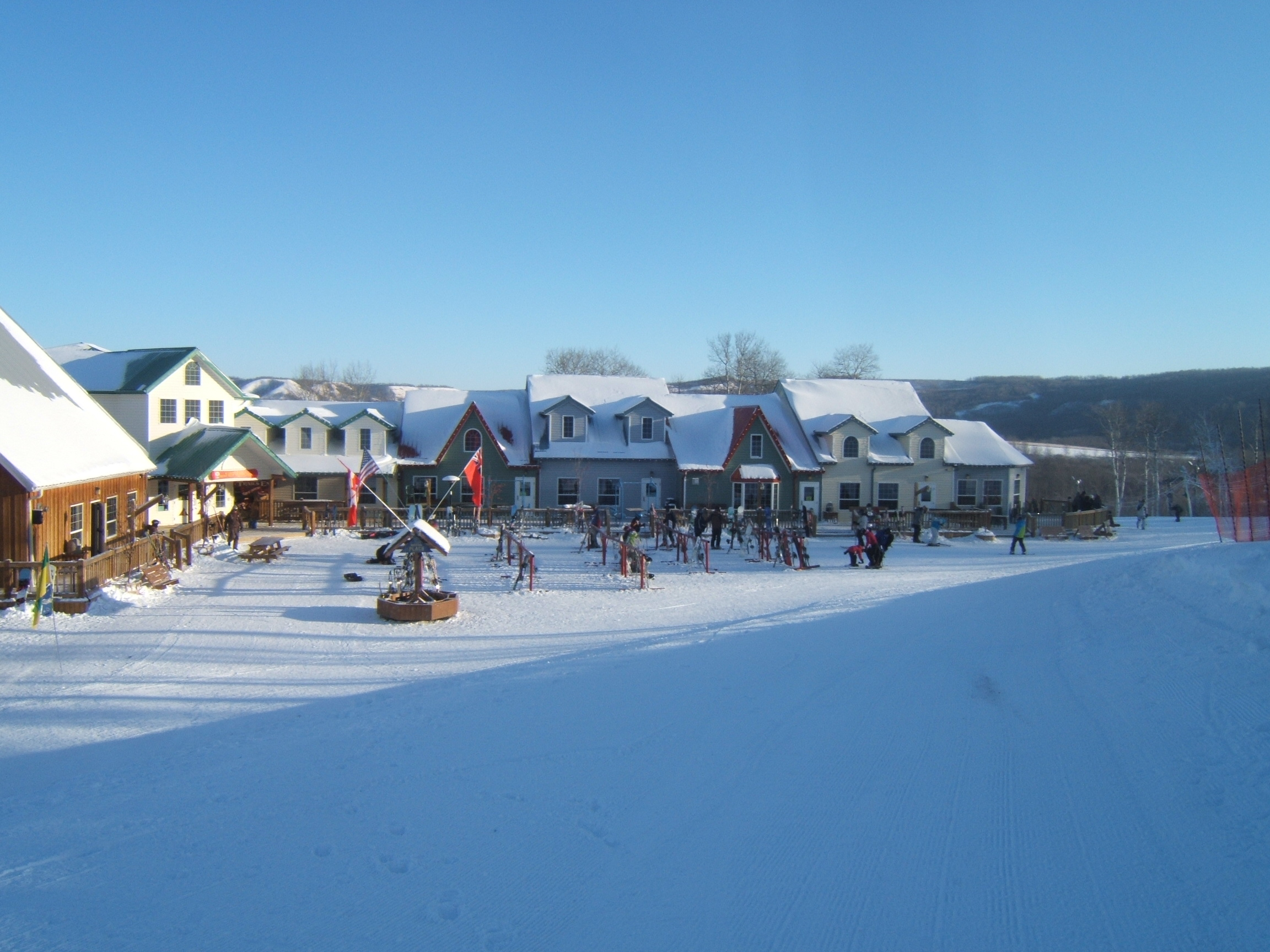
- Asessippi's Winter Village
- Interactive map of Asessippi Ski Area & Resort
- Location: Rural Municipality of Riding Mountain West, Manitoba; Canada
- Nearest major city: Inglis, Manitoba
- Vertical: 121 m (397 ft)
- Top elevation: 553 m (1,814 ft)
- Base elevation: 432 m (1,417 ft)
- Skiable area: 200 acres (0.8 km^{2})
- Trails: 25 34% - Easiest; 33% - More Difficult; 33% - Most Difficult
- Longest run: 0.7 km (0 mi)
- Lift system: 1 Quad Chairlift, 2 Triple Chairlifts, 1 Tow Rope, 1 Magic Carpet
- Terrain parks: 3 Terrain Parks
- Snowfall: 2.5 m (8 ft) annually
- Snowmaking: 100%
- Website: Asessippi Ski Area & Resort

The Asessippi Ski Area is the largest ski resort in Manitoba. It is located on the Manitoba Escarpment and has a vertical drop of 120 metres (400 ft), the second largest in the province. It is approximately 8 kilometres (5 mi) from Inglis, Manitoba, 30 kilometres (19 mi) south of the town of Roblin, and 20 kilometres (12 mi) north of the town of Russell. The resort is built into the side of the Shell River Valley, and is close to Asessippi Provincial Park.

The ski area was founded in 1998. The ski area remained open during the COVID-19 pandemic, except for two weeks when an employee tested positive.
