= MacNutt =

Village in Saskatchewan, Canada

MacNutt, Saskatchewan
- Village
- Location of MacNutt in Saskatchewan MacNutt, Saskatchewan (Canada)
- Coordinates: 51.099°N 101.607°W
- Country: Canada
- Province: Saskatchewan
- Region: Southeastern
- Census division: 5
- Rural Municipality: Churchbridge No. 211
- Established: 1880

Government
  - Governing body: MacNutt Village Council
  - Mayor: Shane Wagner
  - Administrator: Kendra Busch
  - MP: Cathay Wagantall
  - MLA: Warren Kaeding

Area
  - Total: 0.81 km^{2} (0.31 sq mi)

Population (2006)
  - Total: 80
  - Density: 98.5/km^{2} (255/sq mi)
  - Dwellings: 44
- Time zone: CST
- Postal code: S0A 2K0
- Area code: 306
- Highways: Highway 8 Highway 381
- Railways: Defunct

MacNutt (2016 population: 65) is a village in the Canadian province of Saskatchewan within the Rural Municipality of Churchbridge No. 211 and Census Division No. 5. The former District of Landestreu was renamed in 1909 to honour Thomas MacNutt, the area Member of the Legislative Assembly at the time. The village was settled between the late 1880s and the 1910s by immigrants of predominantly German origin.

== History ==
MacNutt incorporated as a village on February 22, 1913.

== Demographics ==
Population history (1981–2016)
Year	Pop.	±%
1981	127	—
1986	108	−15.0%
1991	103	−4.6%
1996	95	−7.8%
2001	85	−10.5%
2006	80	−5.9%
2011	65	−18.8%
2016	65	+0.0%
Source: Statistics Canada via Saskatchewan Bureau of Statistics

In the 2021 Census of Population conducted by Statistics Canada, MacNutt had a population of 50 living in 27 of its 44 total private dwellings, a change of −23.1% from its 2016 population of 65. With a land area of 0.92 km^{2} (0.36 sq mi), it had a population density of 54.3/km^{2} (140.8/sq mi) in 2021.

In the 2016 Census of Population, the Village of MacNutt recorded a population of 65 living in 31 of its 41 total private dwellings, a 0% change from its 2011 population of 65. With a land area of 0.81 km^{2} (0.31 sq mi), it had a population density of 80.2/km^{2} (207.8/sq mi) in 2016.

== Notable people ==
- Duane Rupp, hockey player with the Toronto Maple Leafs, Minnesota North Stars, and Pittsburgh Penguins from 1963 to 1973.

== See also ==
- List of communities in Saskatchewan
- List of villages in Saskatchewan
