= List of villages in Saskatchewan =

A village is a type of incorporated urban municipality in the Canadian province of Saskatchewan. A village is created from an organized hamlet by the Minister of Municipal Affairs by ministerial order via section 51 of The Municipalities Act if the community has:

- been an organized hamlet for three or more years;
- a population of 100 or more;
- 50 or more dwellings or businesses; and
- a taxable assessment base that meets a prescribed minimum.

Saskatchewan has 250 villages that had a cumulative population of 41,514 and an average population of 166 in the 2016 census. Saskatchewan's largest village is Caronport with a population of 994, while Ernfold, Keeler, Krydor, Valparaiso and Waldron are the province's smallest villages with populations of 15 each.

A village council may request the Minister of Municipal Affairs to change its status to a town if the village has a population of 500 or more.

== List ==
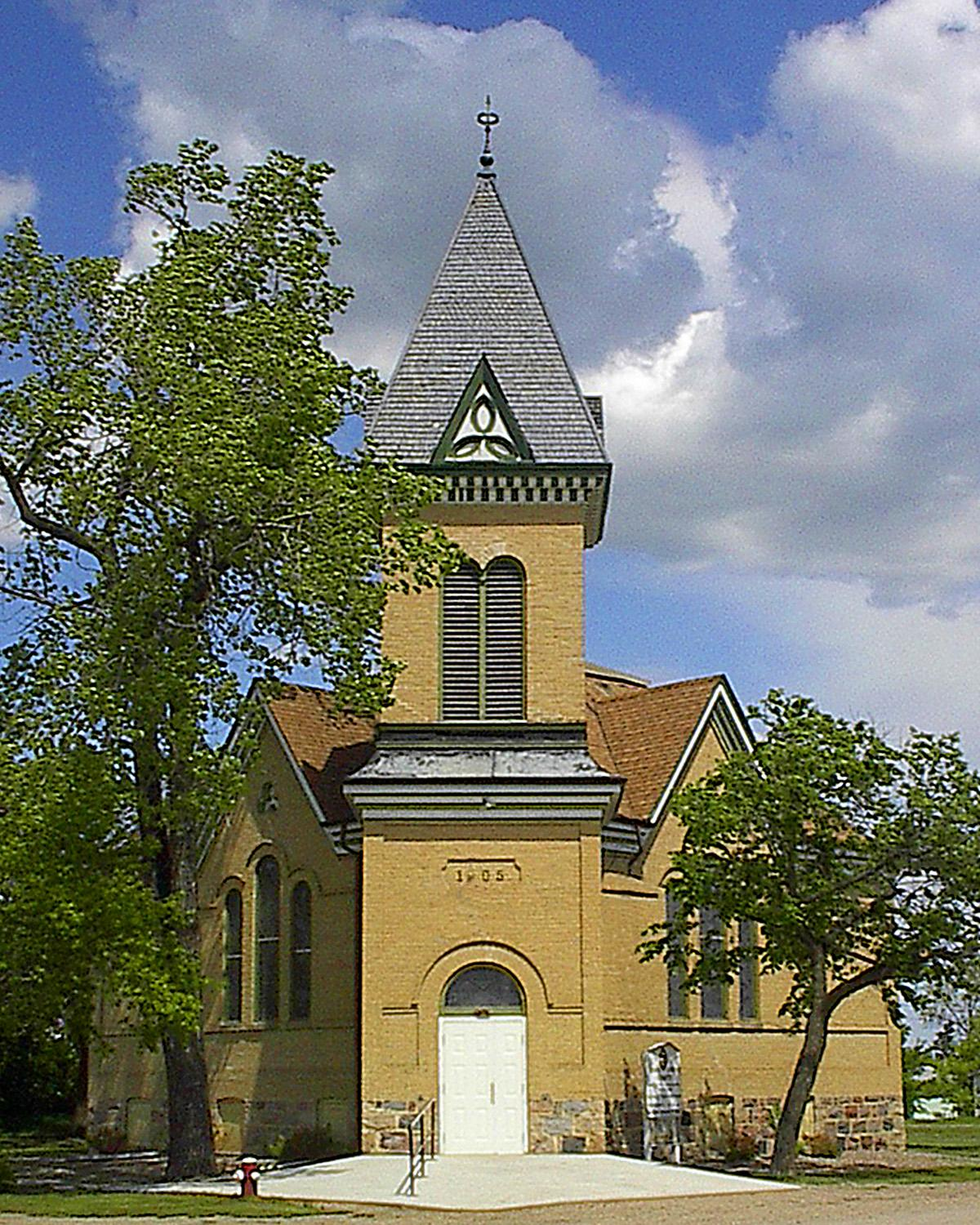
Abernethy

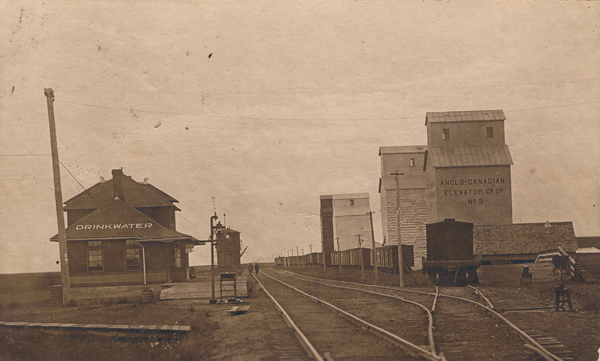
Drinkwater

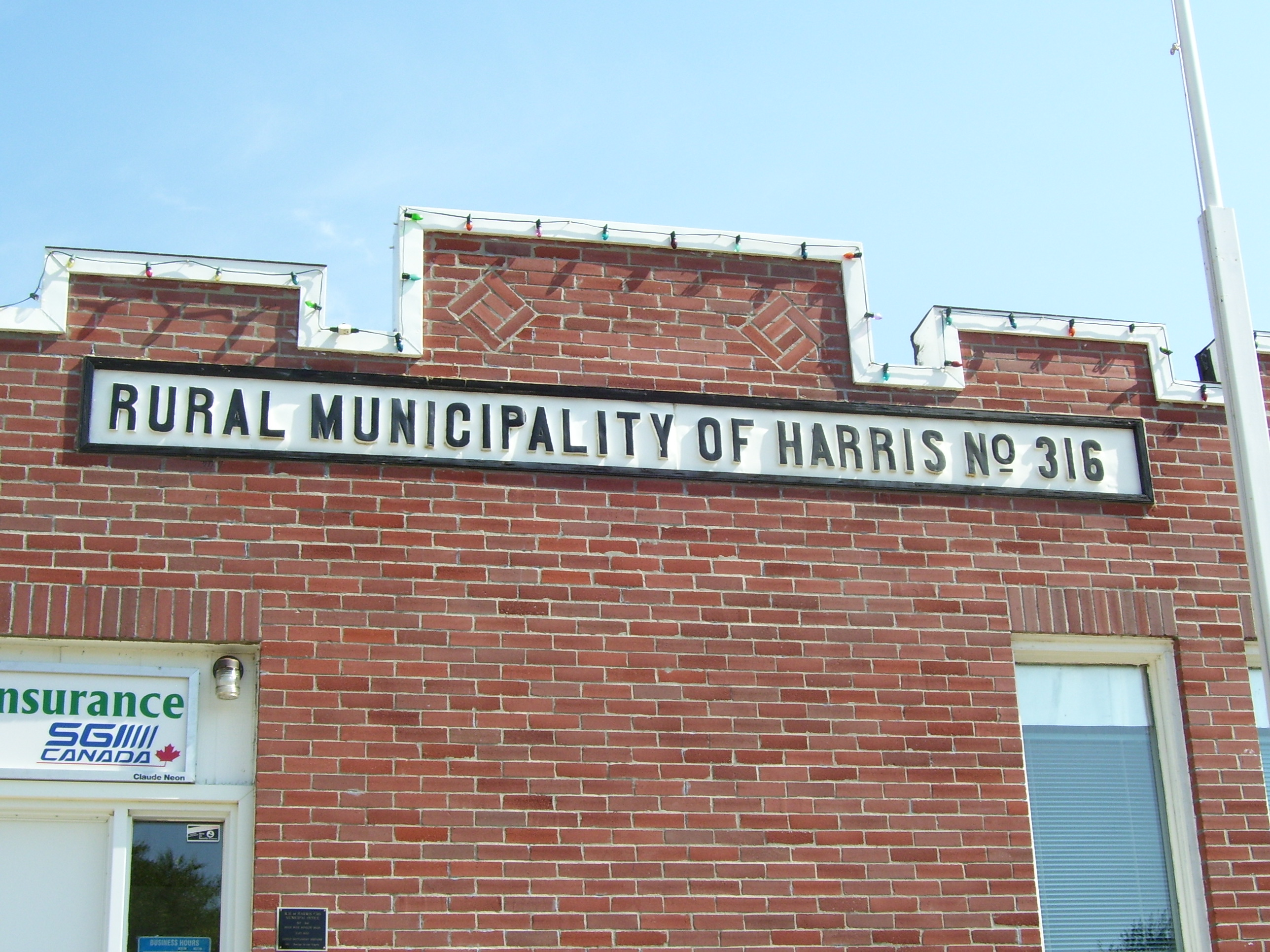
Harris

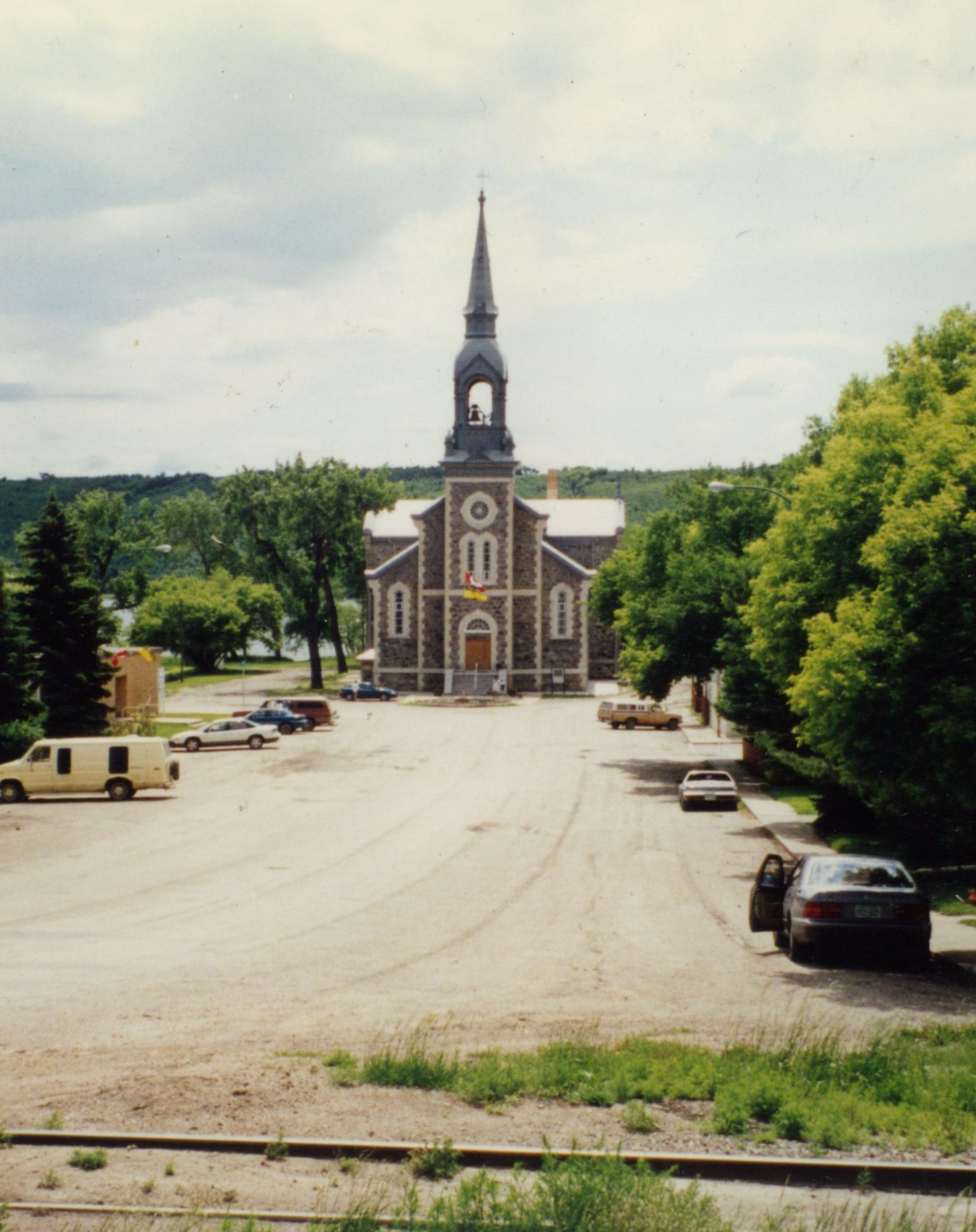
Lebret

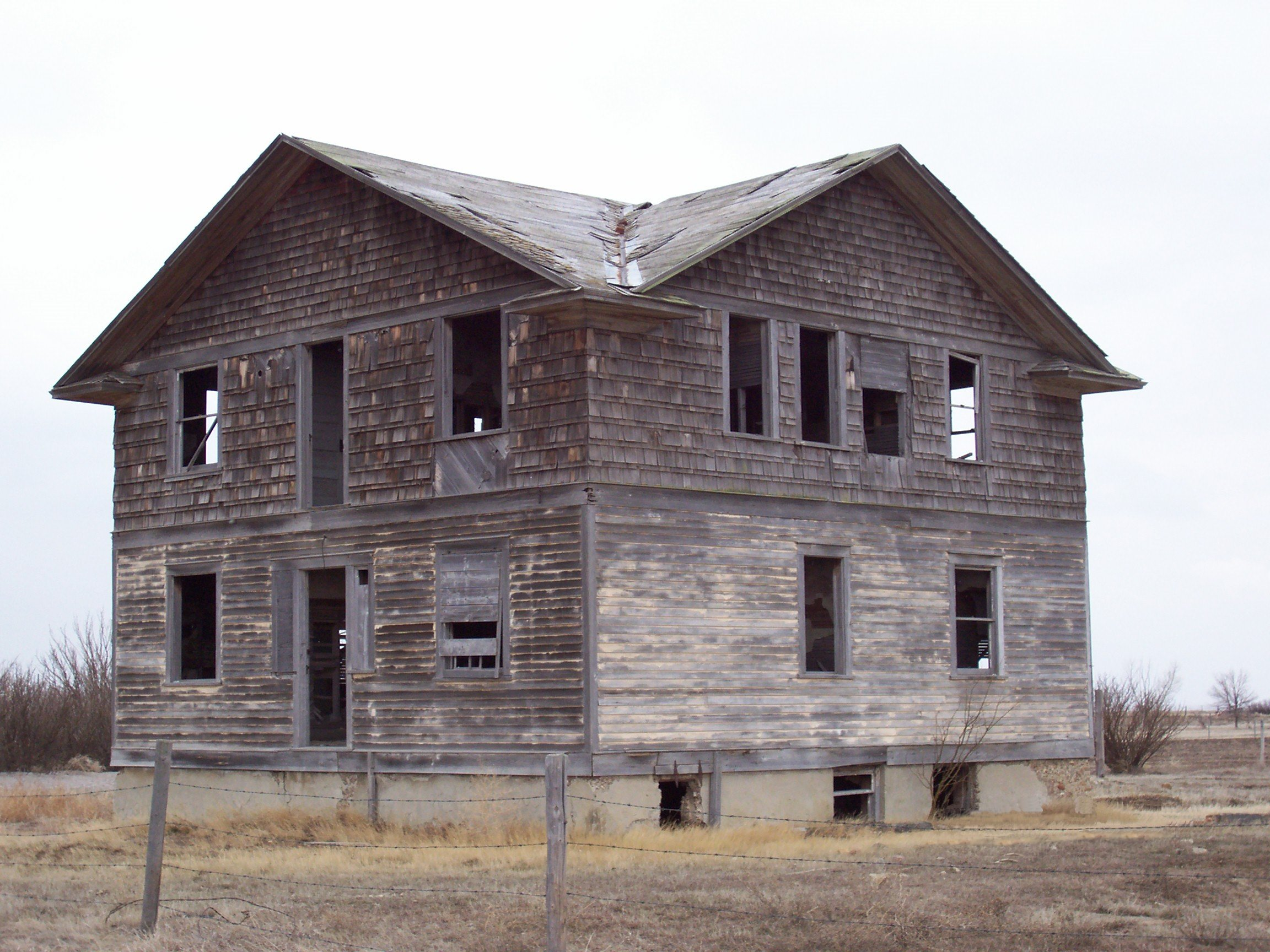
Robsart

Name	Incorporation date	Rural municipality	Population (2016)	Population (2011)	Change (%)	Land area (km^{2})	Population density (per km^{2})
Abbey	September 2, 1913	Miry Creek No. 229	142	115	+23.5%	0.77	184.4/km^{2}
Abernethy	July 26, 1904	Abernethy No. 186	204	196	+4.1%	1.03	198.1/km^{2}
Albertville	January 1, 1986	Wise Creek No. 77	86	140	−38.6%	1.12	76.8/km^{2}
Alida	February 19, 1926	Reciprocity No. 32	120	131	−8.4%	0.37	324.3/km^{2}
Alvena	July 1, 1936	Fish Creek No. 402	60	55	+9.1%	0.43	139.5/km^{2}
Annaheim	April 1, 1977	St. Peter No. 369	210	219	−4.1%	0.78	269.2/km^{2}
Archerwill	January 1, 1947	Barrier Valley No. 397	166	200	−17.0%	0.83	200.0/km^{2}
Arran	September 21, 1916	Livingston No. 331	25	40	−37.5%	0.69	36.2/km^{2}
Atwater	August 12, 1910	Fertile Belt No. 183	30	31	−3.2%	1.79	16.8/km^{2}
Avonlea	February 10, 1912	Elmsthorpe No. 100	393	398	−1.3%	0.96	409.4/km^{2}
Aylesbury	March 31, 1910	Craik No. 222	40	42	−4.8%	1.28	31.3/km^{2}
Aylsham	August 4, 1947	Nipawin No. 487	65	71	−8.5%	0.48	135.4/km^{2}
Bangor	June 8, 1911	Fertile Belt No. 183	38	46	−17.4%	1.65	23.0/km^{2}
Beatty	March 31, 1921	Flett's Springs No. 429	60	63	−4.8%	0.82	73.2/km^{2}
Beechy	May 11, 1925	Victory No. 226	228	239	−4.6%	1.06	215.1/km^{2}
Belle Plaine	August 12, 1910	Pense No. 160	85	66	+28.8%	1.34	63.4/km^{2}
Bethune	August 2, 1912	Dufferin No. 190	399	405	−1.5%	2.38	167.6/km^{2}
Bjorkdale	April 1, 1968	Bjorkdale No. 426	201	199	+1.0%	1.39	144.6/km^{2}
Bladworth	July 27, 1906	McCraney No. 282	65	60	+8.3%	0.84	77.4/km^{2}
Borden	July 19, 1907	Great Bend No. 405	287	245	+17.1%	0.76	377.6/km^{2}
Bracken	January 4, 1926	Lone Tree No. 18	20	30	−33.3%	0.6	33.3/km^{2}
Bradwell	December 26, 1912	Blucher No. 343	166	230	−27.8%	0.42	395.2/km^{2}
Briercrest	April 17, 1912	Redburn No. 130	159	111	+43.2%	0.62	256.5/km^{2}
Brock	July 7, 1910	Kindersley No. 290	142	127	+11.8%	0.74	191.9/km^{2}
Broderick	September 13, 1909	Rudy No. 284	85	71	+19.7%	0.91	93.4/km^{2}
Brownlee	December 29, 1908	Eyebrow No. 193	55	50	+10.0%	2.42	22.7/km^{2}
Buchanan	June 11, 1907	Buchanan No. 304	218	225	−3.1%	1.29	169.0/km^{2}
Buena Vista	November 18, 1983	Lumsden No. 189	612	524	+16.8%	3.61	169.5/km^{2}
Bulyea	March 9, 1909	McKillop No. 220	113	102	+10.8%	1.28	88.3/km^{2}
Cadillac	July 2, 1914	Wise Creek No. 77	92	78	+17.9%	1.05	87.6/km^{2}
Calder	January 18, 1911	Calder No. 241	90	97	−7.2%	0.75	120.0/km^{2}
Canwood	July 18, 1916	Canwood No. 494	332	348	−4.6%	2.56	129.7/km^{2}
Carievale	March 14, 1903	Argyle No. 1	240	236	+1.7%	0.88	272.7/km^{2}
Caronport	January 1, 1988	Caron No. 162	994	1,068	−6.9%	1.9	523.2/km^{2}
Ceylon	September 26, 1911	The Gap No. 39	111	99	+12.1%	0.75	148.0/km^{2}
Chamberlain	January 31, 1911	Sarnia No. 221	90	88	+2.3%	0.7	128.6/km^{2}
Chaplin	October 8, 1912	Chaplin No. 164	229	218	+5.0%	1.26	181.7/km^{2}
Christopher Lake	March 1, 1985	Lakeland No. 521	289	281	+2.8%	4.56	63.4/km^{2}
Clavet	July 1, 1978	Blucher No. 343	410	386	+6.2%	0.84	488.1/km^{2}
Climax	December 11, 1923	Lone Tree No. 18	195	182	+7.1%	1	195.0/km^{2}
Coderre	August 26, 1925	Rodgers No. 133	30	30	0.0%	0.85	35.3/km^{2}
Codette	March 9, 1929	Nipawin No. 487	198	205	−3.4%	0.37	535.1/km^{2}
Coleville	July 1, 1953	Oakdale No. 320	305	311	−1.9%	1.87	163.1/km^{2}
Conquest	October 24, 1911	Fertile Valley No. 285	160	176	−9.1%	1	160.0/km^{2}
Consul	June 12, 1917	Reno No. 51	73	84	−13.1%	0.65	112.3/km^{2}
Craven	April 11, 1905	Longlaketon No. 219	214	234	−8.5%	1.21	176.9/km^{2}
Creelman	April 6, 1906	Fillmore No. 96	113	115	−1.7%	1.14	99.1/km^{2}
Debden	June 7, 1922	Canwood No. 494	337	358	−5.9%	1.39	242.4/km^{2}
Denholm	June 25, 1912	Mayfield No. 406	88	76	+15.8%	0.33	266.7/km^{2}
Denzil	May 3, 1911	Eye Hill No. 382	143	135	+5.9%	0.55	260.0/km^{2}
Dilke	December 30, 1912	Sarnia No. 221	98	77	+27.3%	1.28	76.6/km^{2}
Dinsmore	November 3, 1913	Milden No. 286	289	318	−9.1%	2.59	111.6/km^{2}
Disley	June 24, 1907	Lumsden No. 189	67	75	−10.7%	0.65	103.1/km^{2}
Dodsland	August 23, 1913	Winslow No. 319	215	212	+1.4%	2.93	73.4/km^{2}
Dorintosh	January 1, 1989	Meadow Lake No. 588	134	147	−8.8%	0.88	152.3/km^{2}
Drake	September 19, 1910	Usborne No. 310	197	202	−2.5%	0.72	273.6/km^{2}
Drinkwater	June 7, 1904	Redburn No. 130	70	65	+7.7%	2.64	26.5/km^{2}
Dubuc	May 29, 1905	Grayson No. 184	61	70	−12.9%	0.63	96.8/km^{2}
Duff	May 28, 1920	Stanley No. 215	30	30	0.0%	0.22	136.4/km^{2}
Duval	December 21, 1910	Last Mountain Valley No. 250	83	97	−14.4%	0.75	110.7/km^{2}
Dysart	April 6, 1909	Lipton No. 217	200	218	−8.3%	1.19	168.1/km^{2}
Earl Grey	July 27, 1906	Longlaketon No. 219	246	239	+2.9%	1.31	187.8/km^{2}
Ebenezer	July 1, 1948	Orkney No. 244	185	175	+5.7%	0.62	298.4/km^{2}
Edam	October 12, 1911	Turtle River No. 469	480	444	+8.1%	1.19	403.4/km^{2}
Edenwold	October 3, 1912	Edenwold No. 158	233	238	−2.1%	0.68	342.6/km^{2}
Elbow	April 6, 1909	Loreburn No. 254	337	314	+7.3%	3.92	86.0/km^{2}
Elfros	December 1, 1909	Elfros No. 307	90	96	−6.2%	2.52	35.7/km^{2}
Endeavour	April 29, 1953	Preeceville No. 334	65	94	−30.9%	0.99	65.7/km^{2}
Englefeld	June 13, 1916	St. Peter No. 369	285	247	+15.4%	0.65	438.5/km^{2}
Ernfold	December 4, 1912	Morse No. 165	15	30	−50.0%	1.19	12.6/km^{2}
Eyebrow	January 8, 1909	Eyebrow No. 193	119	139	−14.4%	2.7	44.1/km^{2}
Fairlight	October 5, 1909	Maryfield No. 91	40	40	0.0%	2.71	14.8/km^{2}
Fenwood	June 30, 1909	Stanley No. 215	30	40	−25.0%	1.74	17.2/km^{2}
Fillmore	June 10, 1905	Fillmore No. 96	311	255	+22.0%	1.33	233.8/km^{2}
Findlater	September 27, 1911	Dufferin No. 190	45	50	−10.0%	1.2	37.5/km^{2}
Flaxcombe	June 4, 1913	Kindersley No. 290	124	117	+6.0%	1.49	83.2/km^{2}
Forget	November 21, 1904	Tecumseh No. 65	55	35	+57.1%	1.39	39.6/km^{2}
Fosston	January 1, 1965	Ponass Lake No. 367	45	55	−18.2%	0.59	76.3/km^{2}
Fox Valley	August 30, 1928	Fox Valley No. 171	249	260	−4.2%	0.6	415.0/km^{2}
Frobisher	July 4, 1904	Coalfields No. 4	160	166	−3.6%	1.35	118.5/km^{2}
Frontier	July 10, 1930	Frontier No. 19	372	351	+6.0%	0.93	400.0/km^{2}
Gainsborough	May 25, 1894	Argyle No. 1	254	291	−12.7%	0.87	292.0/km^{2}
Gerald	March 25, 1953	Spy Hill No. 152	136	114	+19.3%	0.8	170.0/km^{2}
Glaslyn	April 16, 1929	Parkdale No. 498	387	397	−2.5%	1.97	196.4/km^{2}
Glen Ewen	March 24, 1904	Enniskillen No. 3	154	144	+6.9%	2.77	55.6/km^{2}
Glenavon	April 13, 1910	Chester No. 125	182	176	+3.4%	1.32	137.9/km^{2}
Glenside	March 30, 1911	Rudy No. 284	76	84	−9.5%	0.77	98.7/km^{2}
Golden Prairie	April 15, 1942	Big Stick No. 141	30	35	−14.3%	0.41	73.2/km^{2}
Goodeve	August 18, 1910	Stanley No. 215	40	45	−11.1%	2.62	15.3/km^{2}
Goodsoil	January 1, 1960	Beaver River No. 622	282	281	+0.4%	1.98	142.4/km^{2}
Goodwater	May 8, 1911	Lomond No. 37	30	25	+20.0%	0.59	50.8/km^{2}
Grayson	April 19, 1906	Grayson No. 184	211	184	+14.7%	1.87	112.8/km^{2}
Halbrite	February 26, 1904	Cymri No. 36	119	108	+10.2%	1.2	99.2/km^{2}
Harris	August 10, 1909	Harris No. 316	193	213	−9.4%	0.72	268.1/km^{2}
Hawarden	July 16, 1909	Loreburn No. 254	52	50	+4.0%	1.24	41.9/km^{2}
Hazenmore	August 20, 1913	Pinto Creek No. 75	70	50	+40.0%	0.73	95.9/km^{2}
Hazlet	January 1, 1963	Pittville No. 169	106	95	+11.6%	0.55	192.7/km^{2}
Heward	November 21, 1904	Tecumseh No. 65	44	40	+10.0%	0.99	44.4/km^{2}
Hodgeville	June 22, 1921	Lawtonia No. 135	172	172	0.0%	1.35	127.4/km^{2}
Holdfast	October 5, 1911	Sarnia No. 221	247	169	+46.2%	1.29	191.5/km^{2}
Hubbard	June 11, 1910	Ituna Bon Accord No. 246	35	46	−23.9%	1.25	28.0/km^{2}
Hyas	May 23, 1919	Clayton No. 333	70	114	−38.6%	1.17	59.8/km^{2}
Invermay	September 1, 1908	Invermay No. 305	273	247	+10.5%	1.22	223.8/km^{2}
Jansen	October 19, 1908	Wolverine No. 340	96	126	−23.8%	0.85	112.9/km^{2}
Keeler	July 5, 1910	Marquis No. 191	15	15	0.0%	1.02	14.7/km^{2}
Kelliher	April 27, 1909	Kellross No. 247	217	216	+0.5%	2.81	77.2/km^{2}
Kenaston	July 18, 1910	McCraney No. 282	282	285	−1.1%	1.17	241.0/km^{2}
Kendal	February 17, 1919	Montmartre No. 126	83	77	+7.8%	0.65	127.7/km^{2}
Kennedy	November 5, 1907	Wawken No. 93	216	241	−10.4%	1.56	138.5/km^{2}
Kenosee Lake	October 1, 1987	Wawken No. 93	234	258	−9.3%	0.35	668.6/km^{2}
Killaly	April 28, 1909	McLeod No. 185	65	74	−12.2%	2.59	25.1/km^{2}
Kincaid	July 19, 1913	Pinto Creek No. 75	111	114	−2.6%	0.82	135.4/km^{2}
Kinley	January 7, 1909	Perdue No. 346	60	45	+33.3%	1.18	50.8/km^{2}
Kisbey	May 8, 1907	Brock No. 64	153	217	−29.5%	2.77	55.2/km^{2}
Krydor	August 25, 1914	Redberry No. 435	15	15	0.0%	0.82	18.3/km^{2}
Laird	May 4, 1911	Rosthern No. 403	267	287	−7.0%	1.29	207.0/km^{2}
Lake Lenore	April 28, 1921	Lake Lenore No. 399	284	297	−4.4%	0.97	292.8/km^{2}
Lancer	September 11, 1913	Miry Creek No. 229	69	61	+13.1%	1.33	51.9/km^{2}
Landis	May 17, 1909	Reford No. 379	152	139	+9.4%	0.8	190.0/km^{2}
Lang	July 27, 1906	Scott No. 98	189	200	−5.5%	0.64	295.3/km^{2}
Leask	September 3, 1912	Leask No. 464	399	413	−3.4%	0.75	532.0/km^{2}
Lebret	October 14, 1912	North Qu'Appelle No. 187	216	199	+8.5%	1.31	164.9/km^{2}
Leoville	June 26, 1944	Spiritwood No. 496	375	366	+2.5%	1.11	337.8/km^{2}
Leross	December 1, 1909	Kellross No. 247	46	37	+24.3%	1.21	38.0/km^{2}
Liberty	January 23, 1912	Big Arm No. 251	78	88	−11.4%	1.37	56.9/km^{2}
Limerick	July 10, 1913	Stonehenge No. 73	115	115	0.0%	0.79	145.6/km^{2}
Lintlaw	December 14, 1921	Hazel Dell No. 335	172	162	+6.2%	1.23	139.8/km^{2}
Lipton	May 15, 1905	Lipton No. 217	345	372	−7.3%	0.75	460.0/km^{2}
Loon Lake	January 1, 1950	Loon Lake No. 561	288	314	−8.3%	0.66	436.4/km^{2}
Loreburn	May 20, 1909	Loreburn No. 254	107	107	0.0%	0.62	172.6/km^{2}
Love	June 2, 1945	Torch River No. 488	50	65	−23.1%	0.46	108.7/km^{2}
Lucky Lake	November 23, 1920	Canaan No. 225	289	287	+0.7%	0.66	437.9/km^{2}
MacNutt	February 22, 1913	Churchbridge No. 211	65	65	0.0%	0.81	80.2/km^{2}
Macoun	October 16, 1903	Cymri No. 36	269	246	+9.3%	1.68	160.1/km^{2}
Macrorie	February 8, 1912	Fertile Valley No. 285	68	65	+4.6%	0.77	88.3/km^{2}
Major	September 29, 1914	Prairiedale No. 321	35	61	−42.6%	2.78	12.6/km^{2}
Makwa	June 1, 1965	Loon Lake No. 561	84	97	−13.4%	0.66	127.3/km^{2}
Mankota	February 3, 1941	Mankota No. 45	205	211	−2.8%	1.42	144.4/km^{2}
Manor	April 15, 1902	Moose Mountain No. 63	295	322	−8.4%	2.79	105.7/km^{2}
Marcelin	September 25, 1911	Blaine Lake No. 434	153	158	−3.2%	1.32	115.9/km^{2}
Marengo	November 5, 1910	Milton No. 292	67	47	+42.6%	0.87	77.0/km^{2}
Margo	April 24, 1911	Sasman No. 336	83	100	−17.0%	0.8	103.8/km^{2}
Markinch	February 16, 1911	Cupar No. 218	58	72	−19.4%	0.68	85.3/km^{2}
Marquis	March 21, 1910	Marquis No. 191	97	92	+5.4%	0.63	154.0/km^{2}
Marsden	April 24, 1931	Manitou Lake No. 442	297	284	+4.6%	0.94	316.0/km^{2}
Maryfield	August 21, 1907	Maryfield No. 91	348	365	−4.7%	2.69	129.4/km^{2}
Maymont	June 24, 1907	Mayfield No. 406	138	146	−5.5%	0.66	209.1/km^{2}
McLean	September 1, 1966	South Qu'Appelle No. 157	405	304	+33.2%	1.33	304.5/km^{2}
McTaggart	October 5, 1909	Weyburn No. 67	121	125	−3.2%	0.69	175.4/km^{2}
Meacham	June 19, 1912	Colonsay No. 342	99	84	+17.9%	1.27	78.0/km^{2}
Meath Park	May 23, 1938	Garden River No. 490	175	205	−14.6%	0.77	227.3/km^{2}
Medstead	April 23, 1931	Medstead No. 497	130	120	+8.3%	0.67	194.0/km^{2}
Mendham	April 1, 1930	Happyland No. 231	30	35	−14.3%	0.5	60.0/km^{2}
Meota	July 6, 1911	Meota No. 468	304	307	−1.0%	1.55	196.1/km^{2}
Mervin	March 17, 1920	Mervin No. 499	159	160	−0.6%	0.73	217.8/km^{2}
Middle Lake	January 1, 1963	Three Lakes No. 400	241	242	−0.4%	1.26	191.3/km^{2}
Milden	July 20, 1911	Milden No. 286	167	181	−7.7%	1.19	140.3/km^{2}
Minton	January 1, 1951	Surprise Valley No. 9	55	60	−8.3%	0.3	183.3/km^{2}
Mistatim	July 1, 1952	Bjorkdale No. 426	101	73	+38.4%	0.47	214.9/km^{2}
Montmartre	October 19, 1908	Montmartre No. 126	490	476	+2.9%	1.7	288.2/km^{2}
Mortlach	January 1, 1949	Wheatlands No. 163	261	289	−9.7%	2.76	94.6/km^{2}
Muenster	August 18, 1908	St. Peter No. 369	430	422	+1.9%	1.33	323.3/km^{2}
Neilburg	January 1, 1947	Hillsdale No. 440	379	448	−15.4%	1.22	310.7/km^{2}
Netherhill	April 28, 1910	Kindersley No. 290	25	25	0.0%	0.73	34.2/km^{2}
Neudorf	April 25, 1905	McLeod No. 185	263	272	−3.3%	2.05	128.3/km^{2}
Neville	July 5, 1912	Whiska Creek No. 106	87	83	+4.8%	1.1	79.1/km^{2}
North Portal	November 16, 1903	Coalfields No. 4	115	143	−19.6%	2.49	46.2/km^{2}
Odessa	March 14, 1911	Francis No. 127	205	239	−14.2%	1.18	173.7/km^{2}
Osage	May 8, 1906	Fillmore No. 96	20	20	0.0%	0.59	33.9/km^{2}
Paddockwood	January 1, 1949	Paddockwood No. 520	154	163	−5.5%	0.65	236.9/km^{2}
Pangman	May 17, 1911	Norton No. 69	232	214	+8.4%	0.73	317.8/km^{2}
Paradise Hill	January 1, 1947	Frenchman Butte No. 501	491	515	−4.7%	2.56	191.8/km^{2}
Parkside	February 21, 1913	Leask No. 464	121	125	−3.2%	0.92	131.5/km^{2}
Paynton	May 2, 1907	Paynton No. 470	148	151	−2.0%	0.85	174.1/km^{2}
Pelly	May 4, 1911	St. Philips No. 301	285	283	+0.7%	0.96	296.9/km^{2}
Pennant	July 29, 1912	Riverside No. 168	130	120	+8.3%	0.65	200.0/km^{2}
Perdue	July 15, 1909	Perdue No. 346	334	362	−7.7%	1.1	303.6/km^{2}
Pierceland	January 1, 1973	Beaver River No. 622	598	551	+8.5%	2.69	222.3/km^{2}
Pilger	January 1, 1969	Three Lakes No. 400	65	65	0.0%	0.52	125.0/km^{2}
Pleasantdale	January 1, 1987	Pleasantdale No. 398	76	76	0.0%	0.56	135.7/km^{2}
Plenty	March 25, 1911	Winslow No. 319	164	131	+25.2%	0.65	252.3/km^{2}
Plunkett	December 28, 1921	Viscount No. 341	60	75	−20.0%	0.64	93.8/km^{2}
Prud'homme	November 15, 1922	Bayne No. 371	167	172	−2.9%	0.84	198.8/km^{2}
Punnichy	October 22, 1909	Mount Hope No. 279	213	246	−13.4%	0.68	313.2/km^{2}
Quill Lake	December 8, 1906	Lakeside No. 338	387	409	−5.4%	1.3	297.7/km^{2}
Quinton	March 1, 1910	Mount Hope No. 279	101	111	−9.0%	0.96	105.2/km^{2}
Rama	December 18, 1919	Invermay No. 305	80	75	+6.7%	0.67	119.4/km^{2}
Rhein	March 10, 1913	Wallace No. 243	170	158	+7.6%	1.09	156.0/km^{2}
Richard	October 11, 1916	Douglas No. 436	20	30	−33.3%	0.73	27.4/km^{2}
Richmound	May 5, 1947	Enterprise No. 142	147	154	−4.5%	0.47	312.8/km^{2}
Ridgedale	December 15, 1921	Connaught No. 457	55	80	−31.2%	0.72	76.4/km^{2}
Riverhurst	June 22, 1916	Maple Bush No. 224	130	114	+14.0%	0.91	142.9/km^{2}
Roche Percee	January 12, 1909	Coalfields No. 4	110	153	−28.1%	2.83	38.9/km^{2}
Ruddell	March 18, 1914	Mayfield No. 406	20	20	0.0%	0.47	42.6/km^{2}
Rush Lake	October 16, 1911	Excelsior No. 166	53	65	−18.5%	0.74	71.6/km^{2}
Sceptre	April 30, 1913	Clinworth No. 230	94	97	−3.1%	1.23	76.4/km^{2}
Sedley	August 3, 1907	Francis No. 127	358	337	+6.2%	1.33	269.2/km^{2}
Semans	December 14, 1908	Mount Hope No. 279	196	204	−3.9%	1.14	171.9/km^{2}
Senlac	October 11, 1916	Senlac No. 411	41	46	−10.9%	0.6	68.3/km^{2}
Shamrock	January 1, 1960	Shamrock No. 134	20	20	0.0%	0.79	25.3/km^{2}
Sheho	June 30, 1905	Insinger No. 275	105	130	−19.2%	1.95	53.8/km^{2}
Shell Lake	October 18, 1940	Spiritwood No. 496	175	152	+15.1%	1.23	142.3/km^{2}
Silton	July 2, 1914	McKillop No. 220	71	95	−25.3%	1.07	66.4/km^{2}
Simpson	July 11, 1911	Wood Creek No. 281	127	131	−3.1%	1.41	90.1/km^{2}
Smeaton	March 7, 1944	Torch River No. 488	182	181	+0.6%	1.48	123.0/km^{2}
Smiley	November 26, 1913	Prairiedale No. 321	60	60	0.0%	0.64	93.8/km^{2}
Spalding	March 11, 1924	Spalding No. 368	244	242	+0.8%	1.18	206.8/km^{2}
Speers	December 24, 1915	Douglas No. 436	60	65	−7.7%	0.69	87.0/km^{2}
Spy Hill	April 22, 1910	Spy Hill No. 152	168	204	−17.6%	1.19	141.2/km^{2}
St. Benedict	January 1, 1964	Three Lakes No. 400	84	82	+2.4%	0.54	155.6/km^{2}
St. Gregor	March 26, 1920	St. Peter No. 369	97	98	−1.0%	0.91	106.6/km^{2}
St. Louis	May 19, 1959	St. Louis No. 431	415	449	−7.6%	1.08	384.3/km^{2}
Stenen	August 14, 1912	Clayton No. 333	90	79	+13.9%	0.7	128.6/km^{2}
Stewart Valley	January 1, 1958	Saskatchewan Landing No. 167	91	76	+19.7%	0.86	105.8/km^{2}
Stockholm	June 30, 1905	Fertile Belt No. 183	352	341	+3.2%	1.65	213.3/km^{2}
Storthoaks	June 5, 1940	Storthoaks No. 31	108	93	+16.1%	0.49	220.4/km^{2}
Strongfield	May 3, 1912	Loreburn No. 254	40	40	0.0%	0.8	50.0/km^{2}
Success	October 25, 1912	Riverside No. 168	45	40	+12.5%	1.38	32.6/km^{2}
Tantallon	June 17, 1904	Spy Hill No. 152	91	105	−13.3%	0.84	108.3/km^{2}
Tessier	August 24, 1909	Harris No. 316	25	25	0.0%	1	25.0/km^{2}
Theodore	July 5, 1907	Insinger No. 275	323	345	−6.4%	1.73	186.7/km^{2}
Togo	September 4, 1906	Cote No. 271	86	87	−1.1%	1.5	57.3/km^{2}
Tompkins	June 2, 1910	Gull Lake No. 139	152	170	−10.6%	2.65	57.4/km^{2}
Torquay	December 11, 1923	Cambria No. 6	255	236	+8.1%	1.35	188.9/km^{2}
Tramping Lake	April 10, 1917	Tramping Lake No. 380	60	55	+9.1%	1.39	43.2/km^{2}
Tugaske	May 7, 1909	Huron No. 223	75	92	−18.5%	0.76	98.7/km^{2}
Tuxford	July 19, 1907	Marquis No. 191	113	91	+24.2%	0.62	182.3/km^{2}
Val Marie	September 13, 1926	Val Marie No. 17	126	130	−3.1%	0.42	300.0/km^{2}
Valparaiso	July 18, 1924	Star City No. 428	15	15	0.0%	0.69	21.7/km^{2}
Vanguard	July 8, 1912	Whiska Creek No. 106	134	152	−11.8%	1.86	72.0/km^{2}
Vanscoy	June 17, 1919	Vanscoy No. 345	462	377	+22.5%	1.49	310.1/km^{2}
Vibank	June 23, 1911	Francis No. 127	385	374	+2.9%	0.73	527.4/km^{2}
Viscount	December 17, 1908	Viscount No. 341	232	252	−7.9%	1.18	196.6/km^{2}
Waldeck	December 23, 1913	Excelsior No. 166	277	297	−6.7%	2	138.5/km^{2}
Waldron	July 17, 1909	Grayson No. 184	15	20	−25.0%	1.45	10.3/km^{2}
Waseca	March 15, 1911	Eldon No. 471	149	154	−3.2%	0.68	219.1/km^{2}
Webb	June 18, 1910	Webb No. 138	50	58	−13.8%	1.41	35.5/km^{2}
Weekes	January 13, 1947	Porcupine No. 395	40	42	−4.8%	0.59	67.8/km^{2}
Weirdale	April 1, 1948	Garden River No. 490	50	75	−33.3%	1.36	36.8/km^{2}
Weldon	January 24, 1914	Kinistino No. 459	197	196	+0.5%	1.1	179.1/km^{2}
White Fox	July 21, 1941	Torch River No. 488	355	364	−2.5%	0.85	417.6/km^{2}
Wilcox	April 20, 1907	Bratt's Lake No. 129	264	339	−22.1%	1.48	178.4/km^{2}
Windthorst	August 21, 1907	Chester No. 125	211	215	−1.9%	1.43	147.6/km^{2}
Wiseton	September 23, 1913	Milden No. 286	79	88	−10.2%	0.77	102.6/km^{2}
Wood Mountain	March 4, 1930	Old Post No. 43	20	25	−20.0%	0.61	32.8/km^{2}
Yarbo	July 1, 1964	Langenburg No. 181	57	53	+7.5%	0.83	68.7/km^{2}
Young	June 7, 1910	Morris No. 312	244	239	+2.1%	2.51	97.2/km^{2}
Zelma	August 10, 1910	Morris No. 312	35	35	0.0%	0.72	48.6/km^{2}
Zenon Park	July 28, 1941	Arborfield No. 456	194	187	+3.7%	0.56	346.4/km^{2}
Total villages			41,514	41,945	−1.0%	295.11	140.67/km^{2}

== Restructured villages ==
The following is a list of former villages in Saskatchewan that have been restructured into another municipality, such as a rural municipality, resort village or city.

Year	Name	Dissolution date	Absorbing municipality	Restructure Type
2024	Prelate	July 1, 2024	RM of Happyland No. 231	Special service area
2020	Keeler	December 31, 2020	RM of Marquis No. 191	Special service area
2018	Carmichael	December 31, 2018	RM of Carmichael No. 109	Special service area
2018	Dafoe	July 31, 2018	RM of Big Quill No. 308	Special service area
2018	Lake Alma	July 31, 2018	RM of Lake Alma No. 8	Special service area
2018	Welwyn	May 1, 2018	RM of Moosomin No. 121	Special service area
2017	Lestock	September 1, 2017	RM of Kellross No. 247	Special service area
2015	Primate	December 31, 2015	RM of Eye Hill No. 382	Special service area
2015	Rabbit Lake	October 30, 2015	RM of Round Hill No. 467	Special service area
2014	Elstow	December 31, 2014	RM of Blucher No. 343	Special service area
2013	Antler	December 31, 2013	RM of Antler No. 61	Special service area
2013	Gladmar	December 31, 2013	RM of Surprise Valley No. 9	Special service area
2013	Ruthilda	December 31, 2013	RM of Grandview No. 349	Unincorporated community
2013	Shackleton	December 31, 2013	RM of Miry Creek No. 229	Special service area
2009	Yellow Creek	August 15, 2009	RM of Invergordon No. 430	Special service area
2009	Alsask	July 30, 2009	RM of Milton No. 292	Special service area
2008	Aneroid	December 31, 2008	RM of Auvergne No. 76	Special service area
2008	Willowbrook	July 31, 2008	RM of Orkney No. 244	Special service area
2008	Penzance	January 31, 2008	RM of Sarnia No. 221	Special service area
2007	Rockhaven	December 31, 2007	RM of Cut Knife No. 439	Special service area
2007	Mantario	June 30, 2007	RM of Chesterfield No. 261	Special service area
2007	Handel	January 31, 2007	RM of Grandview No. 349	Special service area
2006	Herschel	December 31, 2006	RM of Mountain View No. 318	Special service area
2006	Domremy	December 31, 2006	RM of St. Louis No. 431	Special service area
2006	Stornoway	December 31, 2006	RM of Wallace No. 243	Special service area
2006	Springwater	December 31, 2006	RM of Biggar No. 347	Special service area
2006	Veregin	December 31, 2006	RM of Sliding Hills No. 273	Special service area
2006	Meyronne	September 5, 2006	RM of Pinto Creek No. 75	Special service area
2006	Admiral	August 17, 2006	RM of Wise Creek No. 77	Special service area
2006	Leslie	July 17, 2006	RM of Elfros No. 307	Special service area
2005	Spruce Lake	December 31, 2005	RM of Mervin No. 499	Organized hamlet
2005	Cando	December 31, 2005	RM of Rosemount No. 378	Unincorporated community
2005	Guernsey	December 31, 2005	RM of Usborne No. 310	Organized hamlet
2005	Sovereign	December 31, 2005	RM of St. Andrews No. 287	Special service area
2005	Girvin	December 19, 2005	RM of Arm River No. 252	Unincorporated community
2005	Fife Lake	January 27, 2005	RM of Poplar Valley No. 12	Organized hamlet
2004	Vawn	February 16, 2004	RM of Turtle River No. 469	Unincorporated community
2004	Birsay	January 1, 2004	RM of Coteau No. 255	Unincorporated community
2003	Insinger	September 11, 2003	RM of Insinger No. 275	Unincorporated community
2003	Benson	August 12, 2003	RM of Benson No. 35	Unincorporated community
2003	Piapot	June 6, 2003	RM of Piapot No. 110	Unincorporated community
2003	Loverna	March 10, 2003	RM of Antelope Park No. 322	Unincorporated community
2003	Saint Victor	February 26, 2003	RM of Willow Bunch No. 42	Unincorporated community
2002	Viceroy	May 10, 2002	RM of Excel No. 71	Organized hamlet
2002	Arelee	March 21, 2002	RM of Eagle Creek No. 376	Unincorporated community
2002	Woodrow	March 21, 2002	RM of Wood River No. 74	Unincorporated community
2002	Dollard	January 1, 2002	RM of Arlington No. 79	Unincorporated community
2002	Khedive	January 1, 2002	RM of Norton No. 69	Unincorporated community
2002	Lockwood	January 1, 2002	RM of Usborne No. 310	Unincorporated community
2002	Mazenod	January 1, 2002	RM of Sutton No. 103	Unincorporated community
2002	Palmer	January 1, 2002	RM of Sutton No. 103	Unincorporated community
2002	Robsart	January 1, 2002	RM of Reno No. 51	Unincorporated community
2002	Wishart	January 1, 2002	RM of Emerald No. 277	Organized hamlet
2000	Kelfield	December 31, 2000	RM of Grandview No. 349	Unincorporated community
2000	Glidden	October 19, 2000	RM of Newcombe No. 260	Unincorporated community
2000	Glentworth	September 6, 2000	RM of Waverley No. 44	Unincorporated community
2000	Adanac	August 3, 2000	RM of Round Valley No. 410	Unincorporated community
2000	Evesham	August 3, 2000	RM of Eye Hill No. 382	Unincorporated community
2000	Jedburgh	August 3, 2000	RM of Garry No. 245	Unincorporated community
2000	Colgate	May 16, 2000	RM of Lomond No. 37	Unincorporated community
2000	Hardy	January 1, 2000	RM of The Gap No. 39	Unincorporated community
1998	Carragana	March 25, 1998	RM of Porcupine No. 395	Unincorporated community
1998	Madison	February 1, 1998	RM of Newcombe No. 260	Unincorporated community
1998	Salvador	February 1, 1998	RM of Grass Lake No. 381	Unincorporated community
1997	Bounty	November 25, 1997	RM of Fertile Valley No. 285	Unincorporated community
1997	West Bend	May 14, 1997	RM of Foam Lake No. 276	Unincorporated community
1997	Wroxton	January 17, 1997	RM of Calder No. 241	Unincorporated community
1995	Plato	March 28, 1995	RM of Snipe Lake No. 259	Unincorporated community
1991	Spring Valley	January 16, 1991	RM of Terrell No. 101	Unincorporated community
1988	Ferland	November 4, 1988	RM of Mankota No. 45	Unincorporated community
1985	Lawson	December 31, 1985	RM of Maple Bush No. 224	Unincorporated community
1984	Leipzig	February 1, 1984	RM of Reford No. 379	Unincorporated community
1978	Laura	December 28, 1978	RM of Montrose No. 315	Unincorporated community
1976	Govenlock	Date Unknown, 1976	RM of Reno No. 51	Unincorporated community
1975	Dunblane	May 1, 1975	RM of Coteau No. 255	Unincorporated community
1974	Fielding	December 31, 1974	RM of Mayfield No. 406	Unincorporated community
1973	Horizon	December 31, 1973	RM of Bengough No. 40	Unincorporated community
1973	Jasmin	July 1, 1973	RM of Ituna Bon Accord No. 246	Organized hamlet
1973	Kipabiskau	April 30, 1973	RM of Pleasantdale No. 398	Unincorporated community
1972	Ardath	December 31, 1972	RM of Fertile Valley No. 285	Unincorporated community
1972	Ardill	December 31, 1972	RM of Lake Johnston No. 102	Organized hamlet
1972	Carlyle Lake Resort	December 31, 1972	RM of Moose Mountain No. 63	Unincorporated community
1972	Portreeve	December 31, 1972	RM of Clinworth No. 230	Unincorporated community
1972	Summerberry	December 31, 1972	RM of Wolseley No. 155	Organized hamlet
1971	Leney	December 31, 1971	RM of Perdue No. 346	Unincorporated community
1971	Stranraer	December 31, 1971	RM of Mountain View No. 318	Unincorporated community
1970	Truax	December 31, 1970	RM of Elmsthorpe No. 100	Unincorporated community
1970	Wauchope	January 1, 1970	RM of Antler No. 61	Unincorporated community
1967	Darmody	December 31, 1967	RM of Eyebrow No. 193	Unincorporated community
1967	Mawer	December 31, 1967	RM of Eyebrow No. 193	Unincorporated community
1967	Revenue	November 1, 1967	RM of Tramping Lake No. 380	Unincorporated community
1965	Bromhead	December 31, 1965	RM of Souris Valley No. 7	Unincorporated community
1965	Hughton	May 1, 1965	RM of Monet No. 257	Unincorporated community
1965	Amulet	January 1, 1965	RM of Norton No. 69	Unincorporated community
1961	Tate	May 15, 1961	RM of Mount Hope No. 279	Unincorporated community
1960	Glenelm Park	December 1, 1960	City of Regina	Unincorporated community
1958	Richlea	December 31, 1958	RM of Snipe Lake No. 259	Unincorporated community
1957	Parkbeg	December 31, 1957	RM of Wheatlands No. 163	Unincorporated community
1955	McGee	December 31, 1955	RM of Pleasant Valley No. 288	Unincorporated community
1955	Readlyn	December 31, 1955	RM of Excel No. 71	Unincorporated community
1955	Sutherland	December 31, 1955	City of Saskatoon	
1954	Laura	December 31, 1954	RM of Montrose No. 315	Unincorporated community
1954	Verwood	December 31, 1954	RM of Excel No. 71	Unincorporated community
1953	Druid	December 31, 1953	RM of Winslow No. 319	Unincorporated community
1953	Scotsguard	December 31, 1953	RM of Bone Creek No. 108	Unincorporated community
1952	Vidora	January 1, 1952	RM of Reno No. 51	Unincorporated community
1951	Instow	December 31, 1951	RM of Bone Creek No. 108	Unincorporated community
1951	Swanson	August 1, 1951	RM of Montrose No. 315	Unincorporated community
1951	Bridgeford	May 1, 1951	RM of Huron No. 223	Unincorporated community
1951	Lemsford	January 1, 1951	RM of Clinworth No. 230	Unincorporated community
1951	North Regina	January 1, 1951	City of Regina	
1950	Goldfields	April 1, 1950	Northern SK Admin. District	Unincorporated community
1950	Willows	January 1, 1950	RM of Lake of the Rivers No. 72	Unincorporated community
1949	St. Boswells	November 7, 1949	RM of Glen Bain No. 105	Unincorporated community
1948	Ettington	December 31, 1948	RM of Sutton No. 103	Unincorporated community
1947	Forward	December 31, 1947	RM of Norton No. 69	Unincorporated community
1947	Humboldt Beach	February 1, 1947	RM of Humboldt No. 370	Unincorporated community
1945	Venn	December 31, 1945	RM of Wreford No. 280	Unincorporated community
1943	Cavell	January 1, 1943	RM of Reford No. 379	Unincorporated community
1939	Mitchellton	January 1, 1939	RM of Lake Johnston No. 102	Unincorporated community
1936	Tyvan	July 1, 1936	RM of Wellington No. 97	Unincorporated community
1936	McMahon	January 1, 1936	RM of Coulee No. 136	Unincorporated community
1935	Expanse	January 1, 1935	RM of Lake Johnston No. 102	Unincorporated community
1934	Hatton	March 15, 1934	RM of Maple Creek No. 111	Unincorporated community
1930	Estuary	March 15, 1930	RM of Deer Forks No. 232	Unincorporated community
1926	Dana	April 1, 1926	RM of Bayne No. 371	Unincorporated community
1926	South Fork	March 10, 1926	RM of Arlington No. 79	Unincorporated community
1923	North Annex	December 1, 1923	City of Regina	
1923	Pilot Butte	December 1, 1923	RM of Edenwold No. 158	
1918	Birmingham	April 1, 1918	RM of Stanley No. 215	Unincorporated community
1917	Brooking	April 15, 1917	RM of Laurier No. 38	Unincorporated community
1914	Cedoux	March 2, 1914	RM of Wellington No. 97	Unincorporated community
1906	Nutana	May 26, 1906	City of Saskatoon	
1906	Riversdale	May 26, 1906	City of Saskatoon	

== See also ==
- List of communities in Saskatchewan
- List of municipalities in Saskatchewan
