= Saskatchewan Highway 15 =

Provincial highway in Saskatchewan, Canada

Highway 15
- Highway 15 highlighted in red
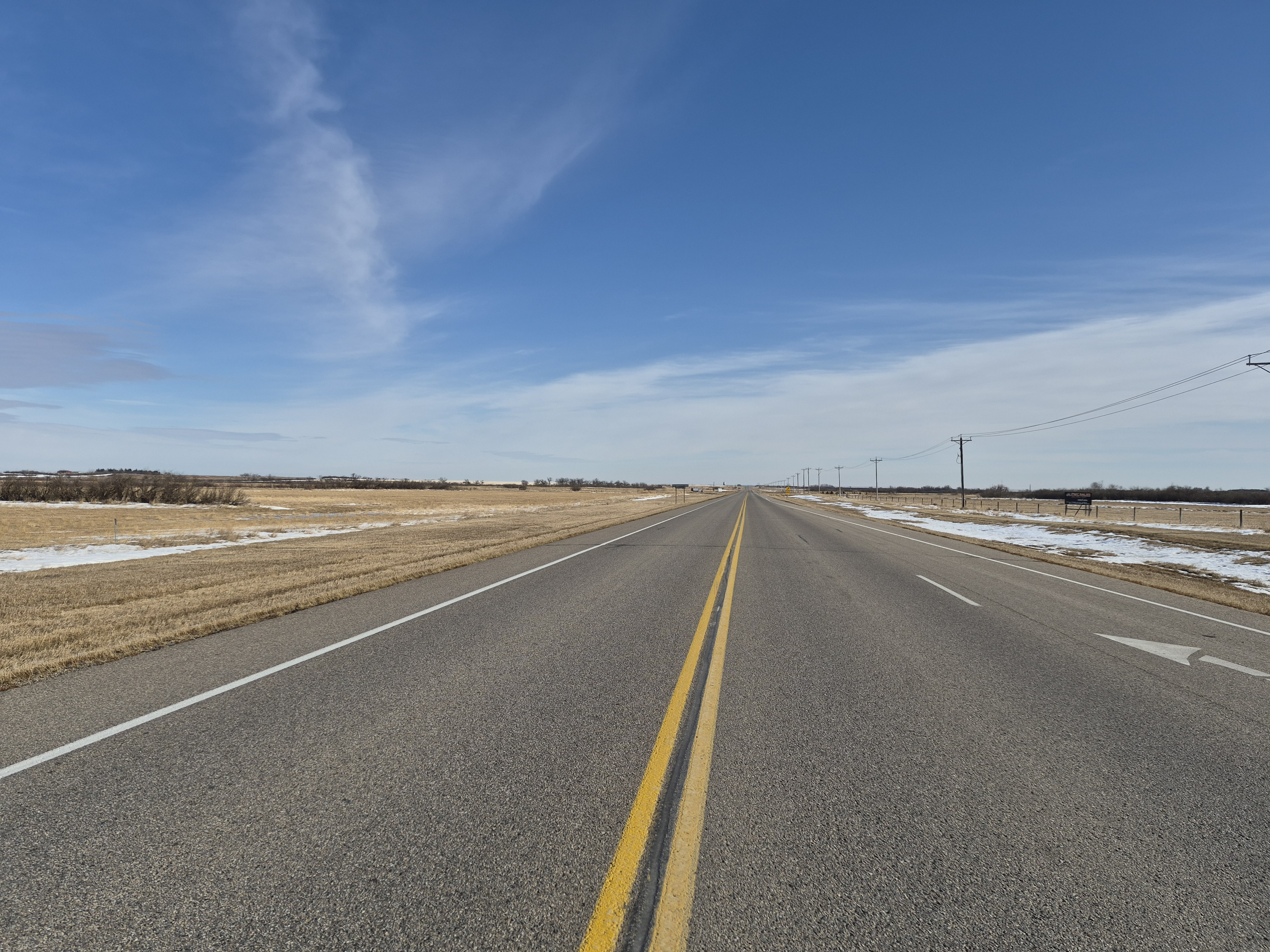
- Highway 15 west of the Outlook Bridge

Route information
- Maintained by Ministry of Highways and Infrastructure
- Length: 449.6 km (279.4 mi)

Major junctions
- West end: Highway 4 near Rosetown
- Highway 45 near Outlook; Highway 19 near Hawarden; Highway 11 at Kenaston; Highway 2 at Watrous; Highway 20 at Nokomis; CanAm Highway / Highway 6 at Raymore; Highway 35 near Leross; Highway 52 near Ituna; Highway 10 / Highway 47 in Melville; Highway 9 near Melville
- East end: Highway 16 (TCH/YH) near Bredenbury

Location
- Country: Canada
- Province: Saskatchewan
- Major cities: Melville
- Towns: Outlook, Nokomis, Raymore, Ituna

Highway system
- Provincial highways in Saskatchewan
← Highway 14	→ Highway 16

Highway 15 is an east–west provincial highway in the Canadian province of Saskatchewan. The highway runs from Highway 4, five kilometres (3 mi) south of Rosetown, east to Highway 16, four kilometres (2 mi) southeast of Bredenbury. It is an important truck route as it is a high clearance corridor that allows travel of over-dimension loads by shippers and commercial carriers. The highway is about 450 kilometres (280 mi) long.

Highway 15 crosses the South Saskatchewan River via the Outlook Bridge, traverses the Touchwood Hills, and parallels the main line of the Canadian National Railway (CNR) between Nokomis and Melville. Some of the larger communities serviced by the highway include Outlook, Kenaston, Raymore, Ituna, and Melville.

== Route description ==
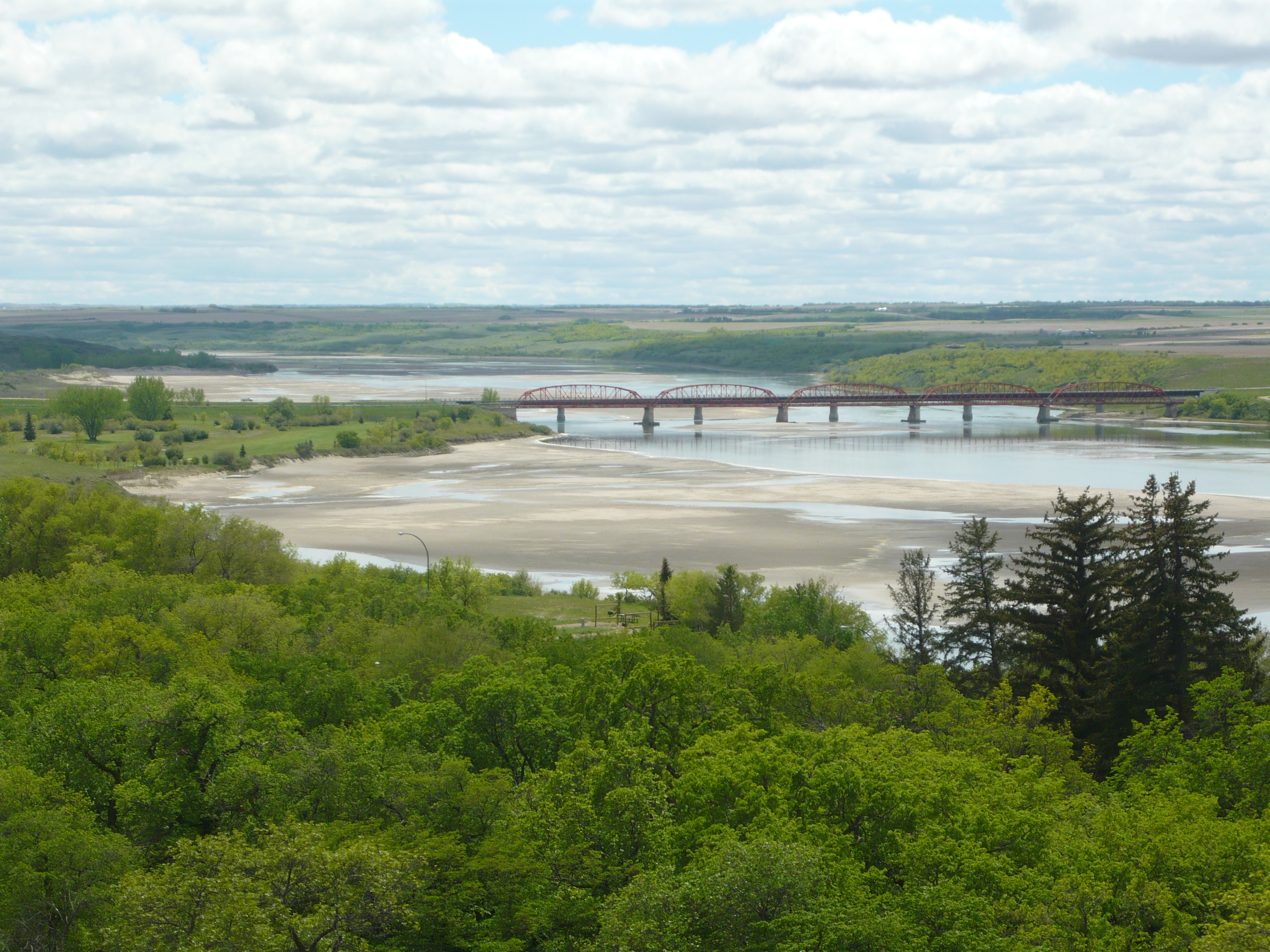
Outlook Bridge crossing the South Saskatchewan River near Outlook

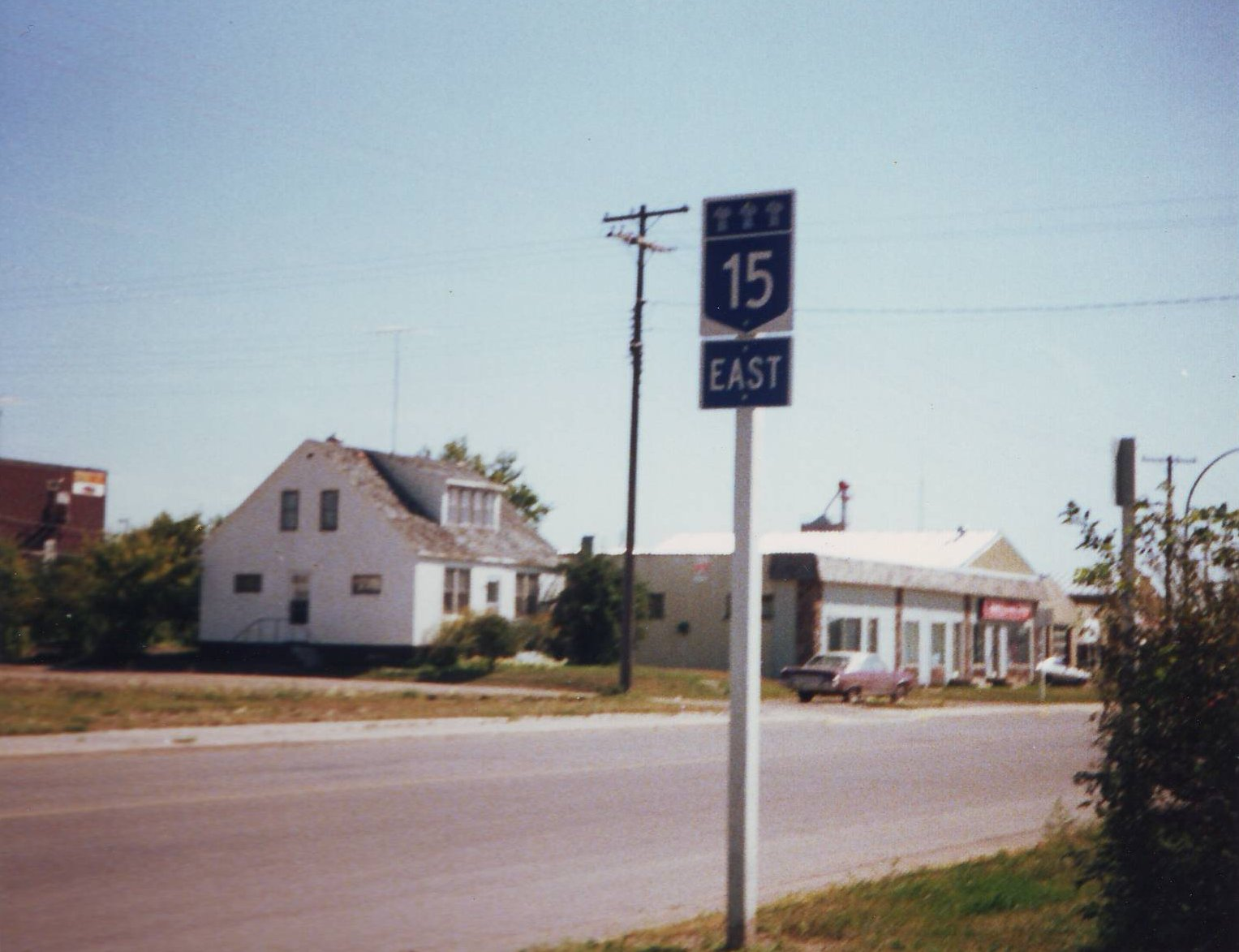
Highway 15 in Melville, c. 1991

The western terminus for Highway 15 begins at Highway 4, about 5 kilometres (3.1 mi) south of Rosetown. From there, it travels east towards the South Saskatchewan River providing access to Sovereign and Milden. The highway crosses the river via the Outlook Bridge. Once across the river, it turns north into the town of Outlook where it runs concurrently with the north bound McKenzie Street. At the intersection of McKenzie St and Saskatchewan Avenue, Highway 15 turns east and heads out of town. Continuing east, the highway comes to Broderick where it turns north-east for about 3 kilometres (1.9 mi) then resumes its easterly routing to Kenaston and Highway 11. Highway 11, also known as the Louis Riel Trail, is a north–south, four-lane divided highway that connects Saskatchewan's two largest cities — Regina and Saskatoon. Highway 15 crosses Highway 11 and travels east for about 87 kilometres (54 mi) to Nokomis and the north–south Highway 20. Along this stretch of 15, the highway provides access to Farrerdale, intersects with Highways 653 and 2 (the longest highway in Saskatchewan), and crosses three tributaries of Last Mountain Lake — Arm River, Lewis Creek, and Lanigan Creek.

The section of Highway 15 from Nokomos to Melville is paralleled by the main line of the Canadian National Railway and runs generally south-east. At Nokomis, Highways 15 and 20 head south running concurrently for 9.7 kilometres (6.0 mi) to Hatfield. Highway 20 continues south while 15 heads east for 33 kilometres (21 mi) en route to Raymore and Highway 6. Semans, at the intersection of Highway 641, is the only community on 15 between Highways 20 and 6. At Raymore, 15 and 6 share a short 2.6-kilometre (1.6 mi) long south bound concurrency. Highway 6 continues south while 15 branches off and heads south-east towards the town of Ituna. From the junction of 15 and 6 to Ituna, Highway 15 provides access to Quinton, Punnichy, Touchwood Hills Post Provincial Park, Muskowekwan First Nation, Lestock, Leross, Kelliher, and Jasmine. It intersects with Highways 640, 639, 35, 52, and 310. Heading into Ituna, 15 has a 4.6-kilometre (2.9 mi) long concurrency with 310. Through Ituna, 15 and 310 follow Main St to 1st Ave NE, at which point 15 splits off south-east following 1st Ave NE out of town. It continues its south-easterly routing towards Melville. The segment of Highway 15 from Ituna to Highway 47 on the western side of Melville is 54 kilometres (34 mi) long. Along this stretch, Highway 15 provides access to Ituna Airport, Hubbard, Goodeve, Fenwood, and Birmingham.

As Highway 15 leaves the intersection with Highway 47, it enters the city of Melville and runs concurrently with 3rd Ave W, Dielschneider Rd, 1st Ave W, and 1st Ave E. From the eastern side of Melville, Highway 15 exits the city and travels east to its eastern terminus at Highway 16 between Bredenbury and Churchbridge. Along the way, it intersects Highways 605, 9, and 637. From Highway 9 east to 16, Highway 15 is an 8-tonne road and banned for heavy trucks.

== Maintenance and upgrades ==
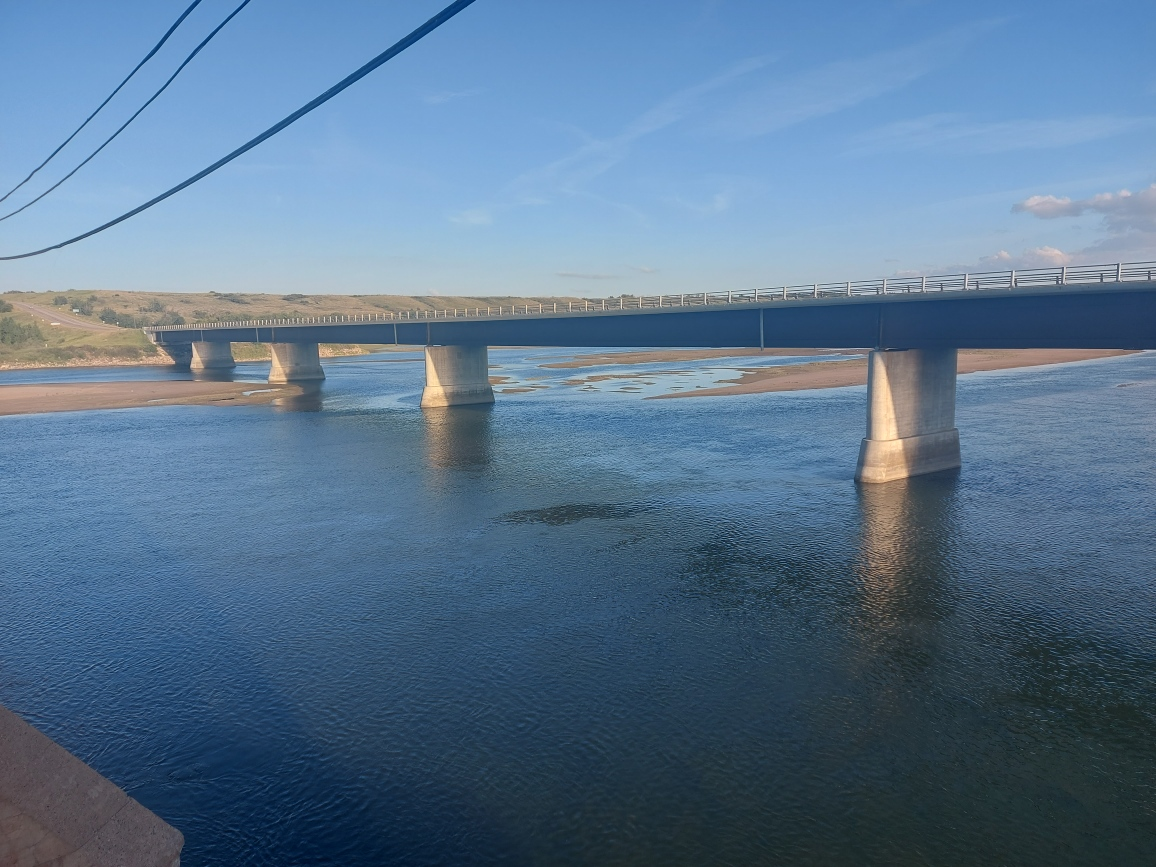
The new Outlook Bridge viewed from the old one

- Highway 15 originally crossed the South Saskatchewan River via the "old" Outlook Bridge that was built in 1936. In 1998 a "new" Outlook Bridge was constructed and the highway was rerouted to the south a short distance to cross the new bridge.
- In 2008, roughly 2 km (1.2 mi) of micro-surfacing was done to Highway 15 from about 4 km (2.5 mi) west of the Conquest Access Road westward.
- In 2023, a two-year highway improvement project was begun on Highway 15 east of Kenaston between Highways 11 and 2. The project, valued at $22.7 million, included the construction of a subgrade, widening and resurfacing of the highway, and culvert replacements. The work included "22 km of highway that started 15 km east of the junction with Highway 11 to about 20 km west of the junction with Highway 2".
- In 2024, culverts were replaced on Highway 15 near Broderick at a cost of more than $1.2 million.

== Major intersections ==
From west to east:

Rural municipality	Location	km	mi	Destinations	Notes
St. Andrews No. 287		0.0	0.0	Highway 4 – Rosetown, The Battlefords, Swift Current	Highway 15 western terminus
St. Andrews No. 287	Sovereign	17.8	11.1	Highway 664 – Zealandia, Forgan	
Milden No. 286	Milden	34.5	21.4	Highway 655 north	
Milden No. 286		36.1	22.4	Highway 42 east – Dinsmore	
Fertile Valley No. 285		44.3	27.5	Bounty access road	
Fertile Valley No. 285		47.5	29.5	Highway 654 south	
Fertile Valley No. 285		52.4	32.6	Conquest access road	
Fertile Valley No. 285		60.5	37.6	Highway 45 north – Delisle	West end of Highway 45 concurrency
Fertile Valley No. 285		62.1	38.6	Highway 45 south – Macrorie, Gardiner Dam, Lucky Lake	East end of Highway 45 concurrency
↑ / ↓		64.1	39.8	Outlook Bridge crosses the South Saskatchewan River	
Rudy No. 284	Outlook	66.8	41.5	Saskatchewan Avenue / McKenzie Street	Highway 15 branches east
Rudy No. 284	Broderick	76.9	47.8	Highway 764 north – Hanley	
Rudy No. 284		85.4	53.1	Highway 219 (Chief Whitecap Trail) – Saskatoon, Gardiner Dam	
Rosedale No. 283		100.0	62.1	Highway 19 south – Hawarden, Elbow	
McCraney No. 282	Kenaston	122.7	76.2	Highway 11 (Louis Riel Trail) – Saskatoon, Regina	
McCraney No. 282		144.8	90.0	Highway 653 south – Davidson	
Wood Creek No. 281		179.0	111.2	Highway 2 (Veterans Memorial Highway) – Prince Albert, Watrous, Moose Jaw	
Wreford No. 280	Nokomis	209.9	130.4	Highway 20 north to Highway 744 – Lanigan, Humboldt	West end of Highway 20 concurrency
Wreford No. 280		219.6	136.5	Highway 20 south – Lumsden	East end of Highway 20 concurrency
Mount Hope No. 279		239.1	148.6	Highway 641 south – Semans	
Mount Hope No. 279	Raymore	252.2	156.7	Highway 6 / CanAm Highway north – Melfort	West end of Highway 6 concurrency
Mount Hope No. 279		254.8	158.3	Highway 6 / CanAm Highway south – Regina	East end of Highway 6 concurrency
Mount Hope No. 279	Punnichy	271.9	169.0	Highway 640 south – Cupar	West end of Highway 640 concurrency
Mount Hope No. 279		273.8	170.1	Highway 640 north – Wynyard	East end of Highway 640 concurrency
Kellross No. 247	Lestock	296.0	183.9	Highway 639 – Wishart, Dysart	
Kellross No. 247		306.4	190.4	Highway 35 – Wadena, Fort Qu'Appelle	East of Leross; west of Kelliher
Ituna Bon Accord No. 246		332.9	206.9	Highway 52 east / Highway 310 north – Yorkton, Foam Lake	West end of Highway 310 concurrency; Highway 52 western terminus
Ituna Bon Accord No. 246	Ituna	337.4	209.7	Highway 310 south – Balcarres	East end of Highway 310 concurrency
Tullymet No. 216	No major junctions				
Stanley No. 215		357.4	222.1	Highway 617 north – Sheho	West end of Highway 617 concurrency
Stanley No. 215	Goodeve	363.1	225.6	Highway 617 south – Lemberg	East end of Highway 617 concurrency
City of Melville		391.4	243.2	Highway 10 / Highway 47 – Yorkton, Regina, Springside, Grenfell	
City of Melville		392.7	244.0	Queen Street	To Highway 47 north
Cana No. 214		405.4	251.9	Highway 605 north – Grayson	
Cana No. 214		416.8	259.0	Highway 9 – Yorkton, Whitewood	
Saltcoats No. 213		433.1	269.1	Highway 629 – Saltcoats, Atwater	
Saltcoats No. 213		446.1	277.2	Highway 637 – Bredenbury, Esterhazy	
Saltcoats No. 213 –Churchbridge No. 211 line		449.6	279.4	Highway 16 (TCH/YH) – Bredenbury, Yorkton, Churchbridge, Winnipeg	
1.000 mi = 1.609 km; 1.000 km = 0.621 mi: Concurrency terminus

== See also ==
- Transportation in Saskatchewan
- Roads in Saskatchewan
