= Surbiton (disambiguation) =

Surbiton is a suburban neighbourhood in South West London, England.

Surbiton may also refer to:

== Associated with the London suburb ==
- Surbiton (electoral division), a constituency of the Greater London Council
- Municipal Borough of Surbiton, a former local government district in Surrey, England
- Surbiton (UK Parliament constituency)
- Surbiton F.C. (1862–1863), an English association football club
- Surbiton Hockey Club, a field hockey club in Long Ditton, Surrey, England
- Surbiton railway station, a National Rail station in Surbiton

== Other uses ==
- Surbiton, Queensland, a rural locality in the Barcaldine Region, Australia
- Surbiton, Saskatchewan, an unincorporated hamlet in Canada
