= Surbiton, Saskatchewan =

Community in Saskatchewan, Canada

Location of Surbiton in Saskatchewan

Surbiton is an unincorporated hamlet in the Rural Municipality of Fertile Valley No. 285, Saskatchewan, Canada. The hamlet is located 15 kilometres (9.3 mi) south west of the town of Outlook west of Highway 45 and south of Highway 15 at the intersection of Range Road 94 and the Canadian Pacific Railway Tichfield Junction Sub.

The community was named for Surbiton, Surrey (now Greater London), England, at the suggestion of Mrs. William Hopkins.

== See also ==
- List of communities in Saskatchewan
- List of hamlets in Saskatchewan
