= Quinton, Saskatchewan =

Village in Saskatchewan, Canada

Quinton
- Village
- Location within Saskatchewan Location within Canada
- Coordinates: 51.231373°N 104.242738°W
- Country: Canada
- Province: Saskatchewan
- Region: Central
- Census division: 10
- Rural Municipality: Mount Hope No. 279
- Post office established: 1909-05-22

Government
  - Governing body: Quinton Village Council, Don Ireland
  - Mayor: Robbie Cox
  - Administrators: Dean Cox

Area
  - Total: 0.96 km^{2} (0.37 sq mi)

Population (2011)
  - Total: 111
  - Density: 115.1/km^{2} (298/sq mi)
  - Dwellings: 58
- Time zone: CST
- Postal code: S0A 3G0
- Area code: 306
- Highways: Highway 15
- Railways: Canadian National Railway

Quinton (2016 population: 101) is a village in the Canadian province of Saskatchewan within the Rural Municipality of Mount Hope No. 279 and Census Division No. 10. The village is on Highway 15 between the town of Raymore and the village of Punnichy. It is near the administrative office of the Kawacatoose First Nation.

== History ==
Quinton incorporated as a village on March 1, 1910.

== Climate ==
Climate data for Quinton, elevation: 630 m or 2,070 ft, 1981-2010 normals
Month	Jan	Feb	Mar	Apr	May	Jun	Jul	Aug	Sep	Oct	Nov	Dec	Year
Average precipitation mm (inches)	12.9 (0.51)	9.8 (0.39)	10.8 (0.43)	18.6 (0.73)	42.3 (1.67)	72.0 (2.83)	78.0 (3.07)	68.1 (2.68)	38.8 (1.53)	25.4 (1.00)	10.7 (0.42)	15.1 (0.59)	402.5 (15.85)
Average rainfall mm (inches)	0.0 (0.0)	0.0 (0.0)	1.9 (0.07)	13.7 (0.54)	40.1 (1.58)	72.0 (2.83)	78.0 (3.07)	68.1 (2.68)	37.3 (1.47)	19.1 (0.75)	1.4 (0.06)	0.0 (0.0)	331.6 (13.05)
Average snowfall cm (inches)	12.9 (5.1)	9.8 (3.9)	8.9 (3.5)	4.9 (1.9)	2.2 (0.9)	0.0 (0.0)	0.0 (0.0)	0.0 (0.0)	1.5 (0.6)	6.3 (2.5)	9.4 (3.7)	15.1 (5.9)	71 (28)
Average precipitation days (≥ 0.2 mm)	4.8	3.7	3.5	3.7	8.0	10.2	9.4	8.6	6.7	4.4	2.9	4.5	70.4
Average rainy days (≥ 0.2 mm)	0.04	0.08	0.58	2.7	7.8	10.2	9.4	8.6	6.5	3.2	0.26	0.0	49.36
Average snowy days (≥ 0.2 cm)	4.7	3.6	3.0	1.3	0.56	0.0	0.0	0.0	0.37	1.2	2.6	4.4	21.73
Source: Environment Canada

== Demographics ==
Population history (1981–2016)
Year	Pop.	±%
1981	169	—
1986	168	−0.6%
1991	168	+0.0%
1996	138	−17.9%
2001	107	−22.5%
2006	108	+0.9%
2011	111	+2.8%
2016	101	−9.0%
Source: Statistics Canada via Saskatchewan Bureau of Statistics

In the 2021 Census of Population conducted by Statistics Canada, Quinton had a population of 89 living in 40 of its 46 total private dwellings, a change of −11.9% from its 2016 population of 101. With a land area of 0.97 km^{2} (0.37 sq mi), it had a population density of 91.8/km^{2} (237.6/sq mi) in 2021.

In the 2016 Census of Population, the village of Quinton recorded a population of 101 living in 43 of its 57 total private dwellings, a −9.9% change from its 2011 population of 111. With a land area of 0.96 km^{2} (0.37 sq mi), it had a population density of 105.2/km^{2} (272.5/sq mi) in 2016.

== See also ==
- List of communities in Saskatchewan
- List of villages in Saskatchewan
- List of francophone communities in Saskatchewan
