= Goodeve, Saskatchewan =

Village in Saskatchewan, Canada

Goodeve
- Village
- Village of Goodeve
- Location of Goodeve in Saskatchewan Goodeve (Canada)
- Coordinates: 51.115°N 103.045°W
- Country: Canada
- Province: Saskatchewan
- Region: East-central
- Census division: 6
- Rural Municipality: Stanley No. 215
- Post office Founded: 1909

Government
  - Type: Municipal
  - Governing body: Goodeve Village Council
  - Mayor: Craig Sawchuk
  - Administrator: Angela Romanson

Area
  - Total: 2.62 km^{2} (1.01 sq mi)

Population (2016)
  - Total: 40
  - Density: 15.3/km^{2} (40/sq mi)
- Time zone: UTC-6 (CST)
- Postal code: S0A 1C0
- Area code: 306
- Highways: Highway 15 Highway 617
- Railways: Canadian National Railway

Goodeve (2016 population: 40) is a village in the Canadian province of Saskatchewan within the Rural Municipality of Stanley No. 215 and Census Division No. 5. The village is the administrative centre of the Little Black Bear First Nation band government.

== History ==
Goodeve incorporated as a village on August 18, 1910.

== Demographics ==
Population history (1981–2016)
Year	Pop.	±%
1981	116	—
1986	100	−13.8%
1991	77	−23.0%
1996	71	−7.8%
2001	70	−1.4%
2006	50	−28.6%
2011	45	−10.0%
2016	40	−11.1%
Source: Statistics Canada via Saskatchewan Bureau of Statistics

In the 2021 Census of Population conducted by Statistics Canada, Goodeve had a population of 40 living in 20 of its 25 total private dwellings, a change of 0% from its 2016 population of 40. With a land area of 2.38 km^{2} (0.92 sq mi), it had a population density of 16.8/km^{2} (43.5/sq mi) in 2021.

In the 2016 Census of Population, the Village of Goodeve recorded a population of 40 living in 26 of its 34 total private dwellings, a −12.5% change from its 2011 population of 45. With a land area of 2.62 km^{2} (1.01 sq mi), it had a population density of 15.3/km^{2} (39.5/sq mi) in 2016.

== Notable residents ==
- John Russell Kowalchuk — MLA for Melville and Minister of Natural Resources

== See also ==
- List of communities in Saskatchewan
- List of villages in Saskatchewan
