= Lefty Wilkie =

Canadian baseball player (1914–1992)

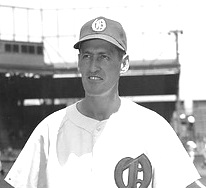
- Wilkie, circa 1947
- Pitcher
- Born: October 30, 1914; Zealandia, Saskatchewan, Canada
- Died: August 5, 1992 (aged 77); Tualatin, Oregon, U.S.
- Batted: Left Threw: Left

MLB debut
- April 22, 1941, for the Pittsburgh Pirates

Last MLB appearance
- June 5, 1946, for the Pittsburgh Pirates

MLB statistics
- Win–loss record: 8–11
- Earned run average: 4.59
- Strikeouts: 37
- Stats at Baseball Reference

Teams
- Pittsburgh Pirates (1941–1942, 1946)

Aldon Jay "Lefty" Wilkie (October 30, 1914 – August 5, 1992) was a Canadian-born professional baseball player. The native of Zealandia, Saskatchewan, was a left-handed pitcher who worked in 68 games pitched, 12 as a starter, in the Major Leagues over three seasons for the Pittsburgh Pirates (1941–42; 1946). He stood 5 feet 11 inches (1.80 m) tall and weighed 175 pounds (79 kg).

Wilkie's professional career began in 1937. After winning 13 games for the 1940 Seattle Rainiers of the Pacific Coast League, Wilkie was acquired by the Pirates that August. He appeared in 26 games during the 1941 season, and another 35 games in 1942. During his rookie campaign, he pitched the only shutout of his MLB career, blanking the Philadelphia Phillies 5–0 on six hits on June 9, 1941.

Wilkie served in the 36th Infantry Division of the United States Army in the European Theater of Operations during World War II, and was out of professional baseball from 1943 to 1945. When he returned to the Pirates in 1946, he appeared in seven games but was ineffective, compiling an earned run average of 10.57 in 7 2/3 innings pitched.

During his time in the Major Leagues, Wilkie allowed 215 hits and 80 bases on balls in 194 innings pitched, with 37 strikeouts, three complete games and three saves. He then returned to minor league baseball, playing through 1951.
