= Conquest, Saskatchewan =

Village in Saskatchewan, Canada

Conquest
- Village
- Village of Conquest
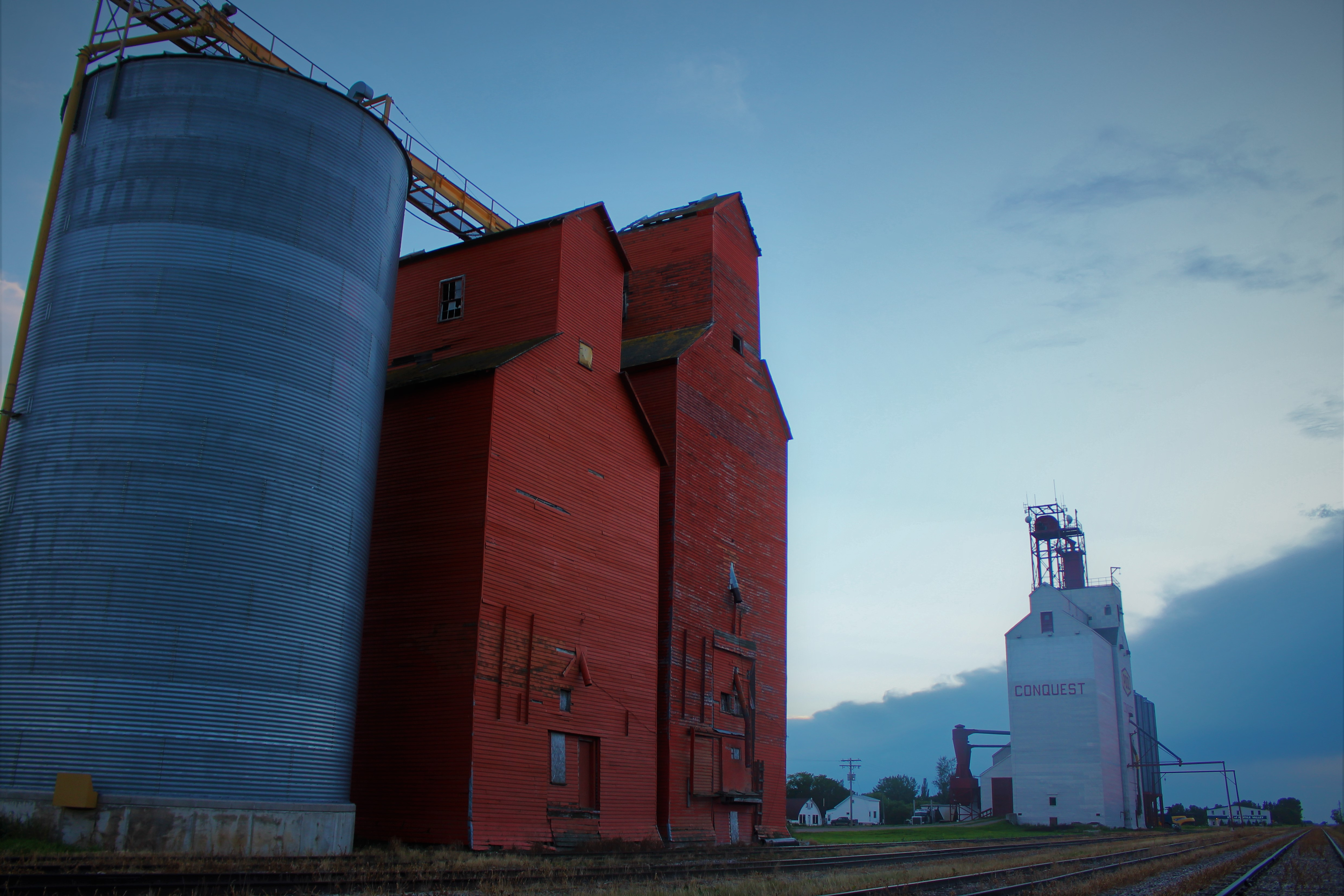
- Grain elevators in Conquest

- Location within Saskatchewan Location within Canada
- Coordinates: 51.310°N 107.220°W
- Country: Canada
- Province: Saskatchewan
- Region: Central
- Census division: 12
- Rural municipality: Fertile Valley No. 285
- Incorporated (Village): 2011

Government
  - Type: Municipal
  - Governing body: Conquest Village Council
  - Mayor: Douglas Lemons
  - Administrator: Bobbi Jones

Area
  - Land: 1.00 km^{2} (0.39 sq mi)

Population (2016)
  - Total: 160
  - Density: 160.5/km^{2} (416/sq mi)
- Time zone: UTC-6 (CST)
- Postal code: S0L 0L0
- Area code: 306
- Highways: Highway 15
- Railways: Canadian Pacific Railway

Conquest (2016 population: 160) is a village in the Canadian province of Saskatchewan within the Rural Municipality of Fertile Valley No. 285 and Census Division No. 12.

== History ==
Conquest incorporated as a village on October 24, 1911.

== Demographics ==
Population history (1981–2016)
Year	Pop.	±%
1981	256	—
1986	221	−13.7%
1991	224	+1.4%
1996	195	−12.9%
2001	163	−16.4%
2006	167	+2.5%
2011	176	+5.4%
2016	160	−9.1%
Source: Statistics Canada via Saskatchewan Bureau of Statistics

In the 2021 Census of Population conducted by Statistics Canada, Conquest had a population of 167 living in 75 of its 76 total private dwellings, a change of 4.4% from its 2016 population of 160. With a land area of 1 km^{2} (0.39 sq mi), it had a population density of 167.0/km^{2} (432.5/sq mi) in 2021.

In the 2016 Census of Population, the Village of Conquest recorded a population of 160 living in 70 of its 78 total private dwellings, a −10% change from its 2011 population of 176. With a land area of 1 km^{2} (0.39 sq mi), it had a population density of 160.0/km^{2} (414.4/sq mi) in 2016.

== Arts and culture ==
Conquest was the setting for the 1998 film Conquest.

== See also ==
- List of communities in Saskatchewan
- List of villages in Saskatchewan
