= Fenwood, Saskatchewan =

Village in Saskatchewan, Canada

Fenwood
- Village
- Village of Fenwood
- Location of Fenwood in Saskatchewan Fenwood (Canada)
- Coordinates: 50.995°N 103.159°W
- Country: Canada
- Province: Saskatchewan
- Region: Southeast
- Census division: 5
- Rural Municipality: Stanley No. 215
- Incorporated (Village): June 30, 1909

Government
  - Type: Municipal
  - Governing body: Fenwood Village Council
  - Mayor: Bryon Dohms
  - Administrator: Angela Dobson

Area
  - Total: 1.74 km^{2} (0.67 sq mi)

Population (2016)
  - Total: 30
  - Density: 17.3/km^{2} (45/sq mi)
- Time zone: UTC-6 (CST)
- Postal code: S0A 0Y0
- Area code: 306
- Highways: Highway 15

Fenwood (2016 population: 30) is a village in the Canadian province of Saskatchewan within the Rural Municipality of Stanley No. 215 and Census Division No. 5.

== History ==
Fenwood incorporated as a village on June 30, 1909.

== Demographics ==
Population history (1981–2016)
Year	Pop.	±%
1981	99	—
1986	73	−26.3%
1991	65	−11.0%
1996	58	−10.8%
2001	48	−17.2%
2006	35	−27.1%
2011	40	+14.3%
2016	30	−25.0%
Source: Statistics Canada via Saskatchewan Bureau of Statistics

In the 2021 Census of Population conducted by Statistics Canada, Fenwood had a population of 42 living in 19 of its 21 total private dwellings, a change of 40% from its 2016 population of 30. With a land area of 1.74 km^{2} (0.67 sq mi), it had a population density of 24.1/km^{2} (62.5/sq mi) in 2021.

In the 2016 Census of Population, the Village of Fenwood recorded a population of 30 living in 14 of its 22 total private dwellings, a −33.3% change from its 2011 population of 40. With a land area of 1.74 km^{2} (0.67 sq mi), it had a population density of 17.2/km^{2} (44.7/sq mi) in 2016.

== Climate ==
Climate data for Fenwood
Month	Jan	Feb	Mar	Apr	May	Jun	Jul	Aug	Sep	Oct	Nov	Dec	Year
Record high °C (°F)	7.5 (45.5)	9 (48)	19 (66)	30 (86)	37.2 (99.0)	36 (97)	36.1 (97.0)	35 (95)	35 (95)	29 (84)	21.1 (70.0)	11 (52)	36.1 (97.0)
Mean daily maximum °C (°F)	−12.1 (10.2)	−8.3 (17.1)	−2.2 (28.0)	8.7 (47.7)	16.9 (62.4)	21.2 (70.2)	23.6 (74.5)	22.7 (72.9)	16.6 (61.9)	9.5 (49.1)	−2.2 (28.0)	−9.7 (14.5)	7.1 (44.8)
Daily mean °C (°F)	−16.8 (1.8)	−12.8 (9.0)	−6.8 (19.8)	3.2 (37.8)	10.8 (51.4)	15.4 (59.7)	17.8 (64.0)	16.6 (61.9)	10.9 (51.6)	4.3 (39.7)	−6.2 (20.8)	−14 (7)	1.9 (35.4)
Mean daily minimum °C (°F)	−21.4 (−6.5)	−17.2 (1.0)	−11.3 (11.7)	−2.3 (27.9)	4.5 (40.1)	9.6 (49.3)	11.8 (53.2)	10.4 (50.7)	5.2 (41.4)	−1 (30)	−10.1 (13.8)	−18.2 (−0.8)	−3.3 (26.1)
Record low °C (°F)	−40 (−40)	−41.5 (−42.7)	−33.9 (−29.0)	−26.7 (−16.1)	−15 (5)	−2.2 (28.0)	1 (34)	−1.5 (29.3)	−6.5 (20.3)	−20 (−4)	−32.5 (−26.5)	−40.5 (−40.9)	−41.5 (−42.7)
Average precipitation mm (inches)	21.2 (0.83)	15 (0.6)	25.4 (1.00)	24.4 (0.96)	53.7 (2.11)	87.7 (3.45)	70.9 (2.79)	70.6 (2.78)	48.5 (1.91)	23.5 (0.93)	15.8 (0.62)	24 (0.9)	480.8 (18.93)
Source: Environment Canada

== See also ==
- List of communities in Saskatchewan
- List of francophone communities in Saskatchewan
- List of villages in Saskatchewan
