= Rural Municipality of Mount Hope No. 279 =

Rural municipality in Saskatchewan, Canada

Mount Hope No. 279
- Rural municipality
- Rural Municipality of Mount Hope No. 279
- Location of the RM of Mount Hope No. 279 in Saskatchewan
- Coordinates: 51.451°N 104.303°W
- Country: Canada
- Province: Saskatchewan
- Census division: 10
- SARM division: 5
- Formed: December 11, 1911

Government
  - Reeve: Brian Jordan
  - Governing body: RM of Mount Hope No. 279 Council
  - Administrator: Jamie Schachtel
  - Office location: Semans

Area (2016)
  - Land: 1,669.17 km^{2} (644.47 sq mi)

Population (2016)
  - Total: 531
  - Density: 0.3/km^{2} (0.78/sq mi)
- Time zone: CST
  - Summer (DST): CST
- Area codes: 306 and 639

The Rural Municipality of Mount Hope No. 279 (2016 population: 531) is a rural municipality (RM) in the Canadian province of Saskatchewan within Census Division No. 10 and SARM Division No. 5.

== History ==
The RM of Mount Hope No. 279 incorporated as a rural municipality on December 11, 1911.

== Demographics ==
Population history (1981–2016)
Year	Pop.	±%
1981	859	—
1986	806	−6.2%
1991	700	−13.2%
1996	644	−8.0%
2001	507	−21.3%
2006	633	+24.9%
2011	567	−10.4%
2016	531	−6.3%
Source: Statistics Canada via Saskatchewan Bureau of Statistics

In the 2021 Census of Population conducted by Statistics Canada, the RM of Mount Hope No. 279 had a population of 531 living in 209 of its 242 total private dwellings, a change of 0% from its 2016 population of 531. With a land area of 1,624.57 km^{2} (627.25 sq mi), it had a population density of 0.3/km^{2} (0.8/sq mi) in 2021.

In the 2016 Census of Population, the RM of Mount Hope No. 279 recorded a population of 531 living in 212 of its 243 total private dwellings, a −6.3% change from its 2011 population of 567. With a land area of 1,669.17 km^{2} (644.47 sq mi), it had a population density of 0.3/km^{2} (0.8/sq mi) in 2016.

== Geography ==
=== Communities and localities ===
The following urban municipalities are surrounded by the RM.

Towns

- Raymore

Villages

- Punnichy
- Quinton
- Semans

The following unincorporated communities are within the RM.

Localities

- Booth
- Last Mountain
- Tate (dissolved as a village, May 15, 1961)

== Mount Hope Wildlife Management Unit ==
Mount Hope Wildlife Management Unit is a conservation area that totals 14,475 ha (35,770 acres) of habitat that is provincially protected under the Wildlife Habitat Protection Act. The lake at the heart of the conservation area – Kurawagan Lake – is a saline lake split into three basins and regulated by dykes. It is the centre of the Kutawagan (SK 064) Important Bird Area of Canada and an important habitat for birds such as various ducks and geese. Specific birds include the northern pintail, tundra swan, greater white-fronted goose, sandhill crane, least sandpiper, piping plover, and the eared Grebe.

== Attractions ==
- Raymore Pioneer Museum
- Semans & District Museum
- Raymore Recreation Site – a rustic campground about 5 km (3.1 mi) north of Raymore along Highway 6
- Semans Recreation Centre (originally Madison Recreation Academy)

== Government ==
The RM of Mount Hope No. 279 is governed by an elected municipal council and an appointed administrator that meets on the second Tuesday of every month. The reeve of the RM is Brian Jordan and its administrator is Jamie Schachtel. The RM's office is located in Semans.

== Transportation ==
- Saskatchewan Highway 6
- Saskatchewan Highway 15
- Saskatchewan Highway 640
- Saskatchewan Highway 641
- Saskatchewan Highway 744
- Canadian National Railway

== See also ==
- List of rural municipalities in Saskatchewan
