= Rural Municipality of Fertile Valley No. 285 =

Rural municipality in Saskatchewan, Canada

Fertile Valley No. 285
- Rural municipality
- Rural Municipality of Fertile Valley No. 285

- Location of the RM of Fertile Valley No. 285 in Saskatchewan
- Coordinates: 51.401°N 107.080°W
- Country: Canada
- Province: Saskatchewan
- Census division: 12
- SARM division: 5
- Formed: December 13, 1909

Government
  - Reeve: Barry Friesen
  - Governing body: RM of Fertile Valley No. 285 Council
  - Administrator: L Jean Jones
  - Office location: Conquest

Area (2016)
  - Land: 1,016.37 km^{2} (392.42 sq mi)

Population (2016)
  - Total: 539
  - Density: 0.5/km^{2} (1.3/sq mi)
- Time zone: CST
  - Summer (DST): CST
- Postal code: S0L 0L0
- Area codes: 306 and 639
- Highway(s): Highway 15; Highway 44; Highway 45
- Waterway(s): Anerley Lakes; Coteau Lake; Macdonald Creek; Milden Lake; South Saskatchewan River; Stockwell Lake

The Rural Municipality of Fertile Valley No. 285 (2016 population: 539) is a rural municipality (RM) in the Canadian province of Saskatchewan within Census Division No. 12 and SARM Division No. 5. It is located in the southwest portion of the province.

== History ==
The RM of Fertile Valley No. 285 incorporated as a rural municipality on December 13, 1909.

== Geography ==
=== Communities and localities ===
The following urban municipalities are surrounded by the RM.

Villages

- Conquest
- Macrorie

The following unincorporated communities are within the RM.

Localities

- Anerley
- Ardath (dissolved as a village December 31, 1972)
- Betalock
- Bounty (dissolved as a village November 25, 1997)
- Bratton
- Surbiton

== Attractions ==
The eastern boundary of the RM runs along the South Saskatchewan River with the south-east corner at Gardiner Dam on Lake Diefenbaker. A portion of Danielson Provincial Park is within the RM near the dam.

On the RM's eastern boundary, and the western bank of the South Saskatchewan River, is Coldwell Park Recreation Site (51.3098°N 106.9353°W). It is a provincial recreation site that has a day-use area, access to the river, a picnic site, and 19 rustic campsites. Access is off Highway 44.

== Demographics ==
Population history (1981–2016)
Year	Pop.	±%
1981	834	—
1986	770	−7.7%
1991	657	−14.7%
1996	610	−7.2%
2001	602	−1.3%
2006	609	+1.2%
2011	511	−16.1%
2016	539	+5.5%
Source: Statistics Canada via Saskatchewan Bureau of Statistics

In the 2021 Census of Population conducted by Statistics Canada, the RM of Fertile Valley No. 285 had a population of 604 living in 169 of its 181 total private dwellings, a change of 12.1% from its 2016 population of 539. With a land area of 1,010.19 km^{2} (390.04 sq mi), it had a population density of 0.6/km^{2} (1.5/sq mi) in 2021.

In the 2016 Census of Population, the RM of Fertile Valley No. 285 recorded a population of 539 living in 170 of its 182 total private dwellings, a 5.5% change from its 2011 population of 511. With a land area of 1,016.37 km^{2} (392.42 sq mi), it had a population density of 0.5/km^{2} (1.4/sq mi) in 2016.

== Government ==
The RM of Fertile Valley No. 285 is governed by an elected municipal council and an appointed administrator that meets on the second Wednesday of every month. The reeve of the RM is Barry Friesen while its administrator is L Jean Jones. The RM's office is located in Conquest.

== Transportation ==
Highway	Starting point	Community	Ending point
Highway 15	Highway 4	None	Highway 20
Highway 44	Highway 9	Macrorie	Highway 11
Highway 45	Highway 7	Macrorie	Highway 42

== See also ==
- List of rural municipalities in Saskatchewan
