= Leross =

Village in Saskatchewan, Canada

- Village
- Village of Leross
- Location of Leross in Saskatchewan Leross (Canada)
- Coordinates: 51.288°N 103.868°W
- Country: Canada
- Province: Saskatchewan
- Region: Central
- Census division: 10
- Rural Municipality: Kellross

Government
  - Type: Municipal
  - Governing body: Leross Village Council
  - Mayor: Francis Klyne
  - Administrator: Elaine Klyne

Area
  - Total: 1.21 km^{2} (0.47 sq mi)

Population (2016)
  - Total: 46
  - Density: 38/km^{2} (98/sq mi)
- Time zone: UTC-6 (CST)
- Postal code: S0A 2C0
- Area code: 306
- Highways: Highway 15; Highway 35

Leross /ˈliːrɒs/ or /ləˈrɒs/ (2016 population: 46) is a village in the Canadian province of Saskatchewan within the Rural Municipality of Kellross No. 247 and Census Division No. 10.

== History ==
Leross incorporated as a village on December 1, 1909.

== Demographics ==
Population history (1981–2016)
Year	Pop.	±%
1981	94	—
1986	103	+9.6%
1991	91	−11.7%
1996	82	−9.9%
2001	59	−28.0%
2006	42	−28.8%
2011	37	−11.9%
2016	46	+24.3%
Source: Statistics Canada via Saskatchewan Bureau of Statistics

In the 2021 Census of Population conducted by Statistics Canada, Leross had a population of 40 living in 14 of its 16 total private dwellings, a change of −13% from its 2016 population of 46. With a land area of 1.28 km^{2} (0.49 sq mi), it had a population density of 31.3/km^{2} (80.9/sq mi) in 2021.

In the 2016 Census of Population, the Village of Leross recorded a population of 46 living in 22 of its 26 total private dwellings, a 19.6% change from its 2011 population of 37. With a land area of 1.21 km^{2} (0.47 sq mi), it had a population density of 38.0/km^{2} (98.5/sq mi) in 2016.

== Attractions ==
The Kellross Heritage Museum (1962–3) is a municipal heritage property on the Canadian Register of Historic Places, located within the village of Leross.

== See also ==
- List of communities in Saskatchewan
- List of villages in Saskatchewan
