= Rural Municipality of Kellross No. 247 =

Rural municipality in Saskatchewan, Canada

Kellross No. 247
- Rural municipality
- Rural Municipality of Kellross No. 247
- Location of the RM of Kellross No. 247 in Saskatchewan
- Coordinates: 51.292°N 103.972°W
- Country: Canada
- Province: Saskatchewan
- Census division: 10
- SARM division: 4
- Formed: December 13, 1909

Government
  - Reeve: Thad Trefiak
  - Governing body: RM of Kellross No. 247 Council
  - Administrator: Edith Goddard
  - Office location: Leross

Area (2016)
  - Land: 834.09 km^{2} (322.04 sq mi)

Population (2016)
  - Total: 305
  - Density: 0.4/km^{2} (1.0/sq mi)
- Time zone: UTC−06:00 (CST)
- Area codes: 306 and 639

The Rural Municipality of Kellross No. 247 (2016 population: 305) is a rural municipality (RM) in the Canadian province of Saskatchewan within Census Division No. 10 and SARM Division No. 4.

== History ==
The RM of Kellross No. 247 incorporated as a rural municipality on December 13, 1909. Its name is a portmanteau of Kelliher and Leross.

== Geography ==
=== Communities and localities ===
The following urban municipalities are surrounded by the RM.

Villages

- Kelliher
- Leross
- Lestock

The following unincorporated communities are within the RM.

Localities

- Enid
- McDonald Hills

== Demographics ==
Population history (1981–2016)
Year	Pop.	±%
1981	922	—
1986	848	−8.0%
1991	734	−13.4%
1996	541	−26.3%
2001	471	−12.9%
2006	390	−17.2%
2011	362	−7.2%
2016	305	−15.7%
Source: Statistics Canada via Saskatchewan Bureau of Statistics

In the 2021 Census of Population conducted by Statistics Canada, the RM of Kellross No. 247 had a population of 396 living in 181 of its 217 total private dwellings, a change of 0.3% from its 2016 population of 395. With a land area of 809.22 km^{2} (312.44 sq mi), it had a population density of 0.5/km^{2} (1.3/sq mi) in 2021.

In the 2016 Census of Population, the RM of Kellross No. 247 recorded a population of 305 living in 138 of its 160 total private dwellings, a −15.7% change from its 2011 population of 362. With a land area of 834.09 km^{2} (322.04 sq mi), it had a population density of 0.4/km^{2} (0.9/sq mi) in 2016.

== Attractions ==
- Kelliher & District Museum
- Kellross Heritage Museum
- Touchwood Hills Post Provincial Historic Park

== Government ==
The RM of Kellross No. 247 is governed by an elected municipal council and an appointed administrator that meets on the seventh day of the month of every month. The reeve of the RM is Thad Trefiak while its administrator is Edith Goddard. The RM's office is located in Leross.

== Transportation ==
- Saskatchewan Highway 15
- Saskatchewan Highway 35
- Saskatchewan Highway 639
- Saskatchewan Highway 731
- Canadian National Railway

== See also ==
- List of rural municipalities in Saskatchewan
- List of geographic names derived from portmanteaus
