= Outlook Bridge =

Highway bridge over the South Saskatchewan River, Saskatchewan, Canada

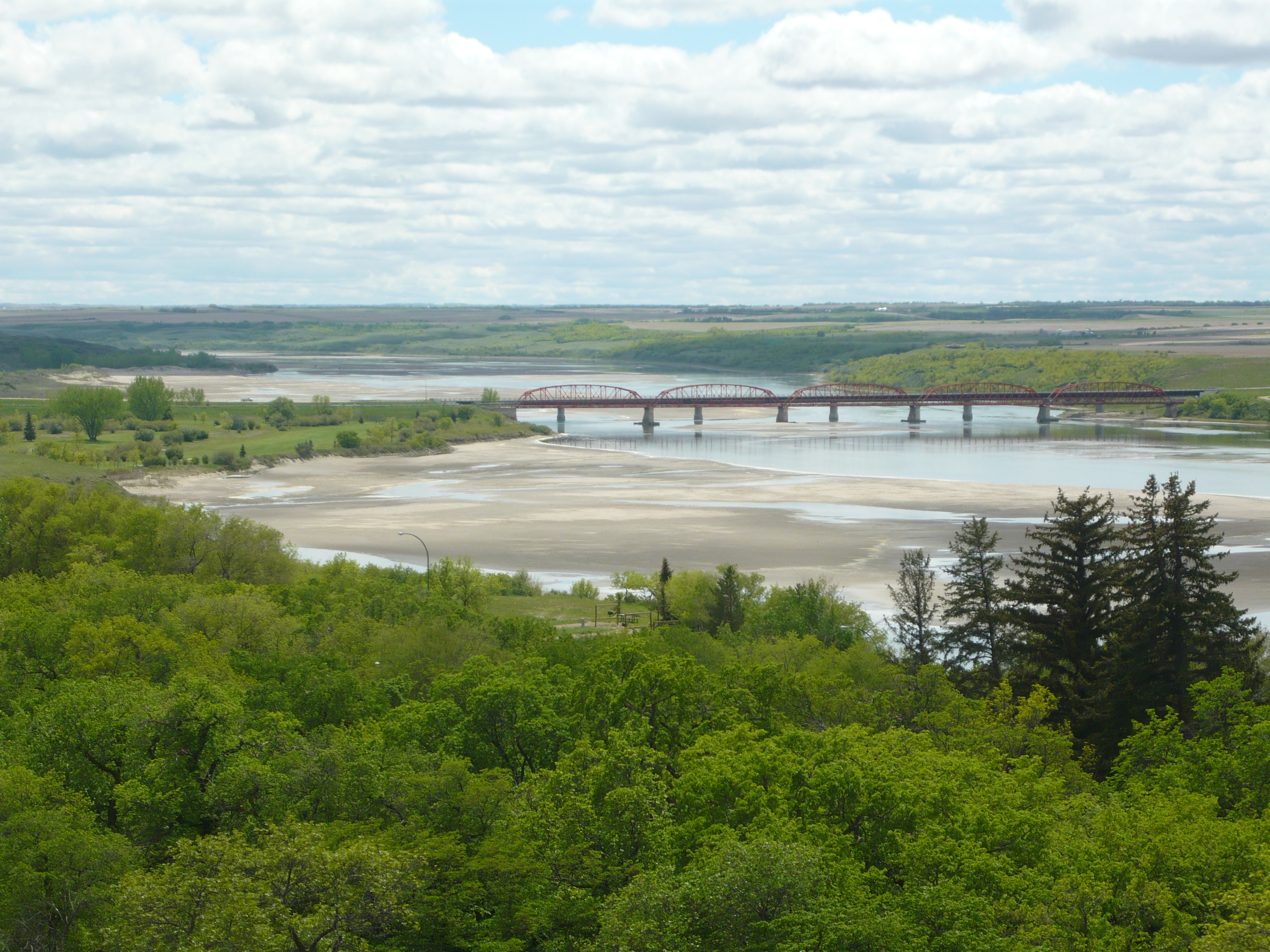
- Outlook Bridges (old and new)
- Coordinates: 51.473996°N 107.077051°W
- Carries: 2 lanes of Highway 15
- Crosses: South Saskatchewan River
- Locale: Outlook, Saskatchewan, Canada
- Official name: Outlook Bridge

Characteristics
- Material: Steel

History
- Construction end: 1998
- Opened: October 8, 1998

Location
- Interactive map of Outlook Bridge

The Outlook Bridge is a Canadian traffic bridge that spans the South Saskatchewan River near Outlook, Saskatchewan and carries Highway 15. There are two bridges at the crossing - the original one, which was built in 1936, and the new one, built in 1998.

The new bridge was built by the Saskatchewan Ministry of Transport at a cost of $11M, officially opened on October 8, 1998 by Judy Bradley.

The old bridge, nicknamed the "Big Orange Bridge" (BOB), was built in 1936. It was closed in 1998 with the opening of the new bridge. In 2012 it was converted into a pedestrian bridge.

== Gallery ==
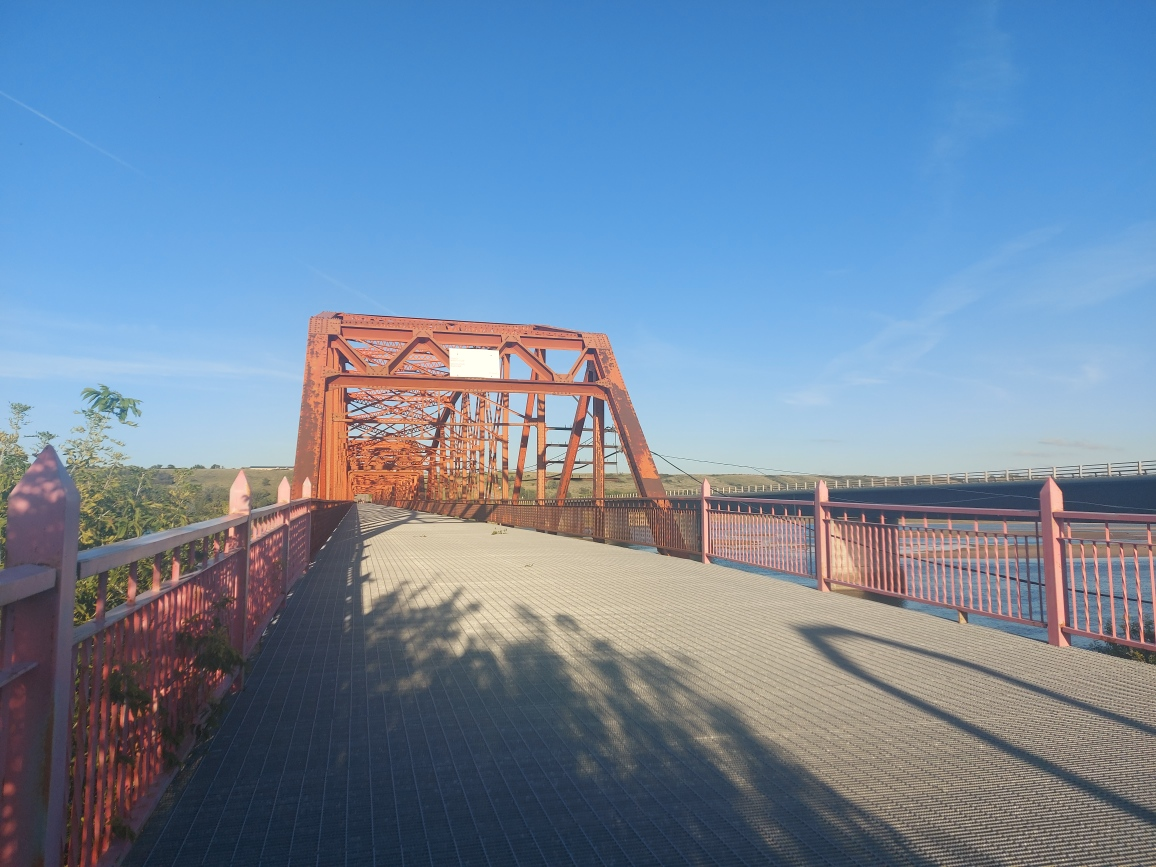
The Old Outlook Bridge crossing the South Saskatchewan River

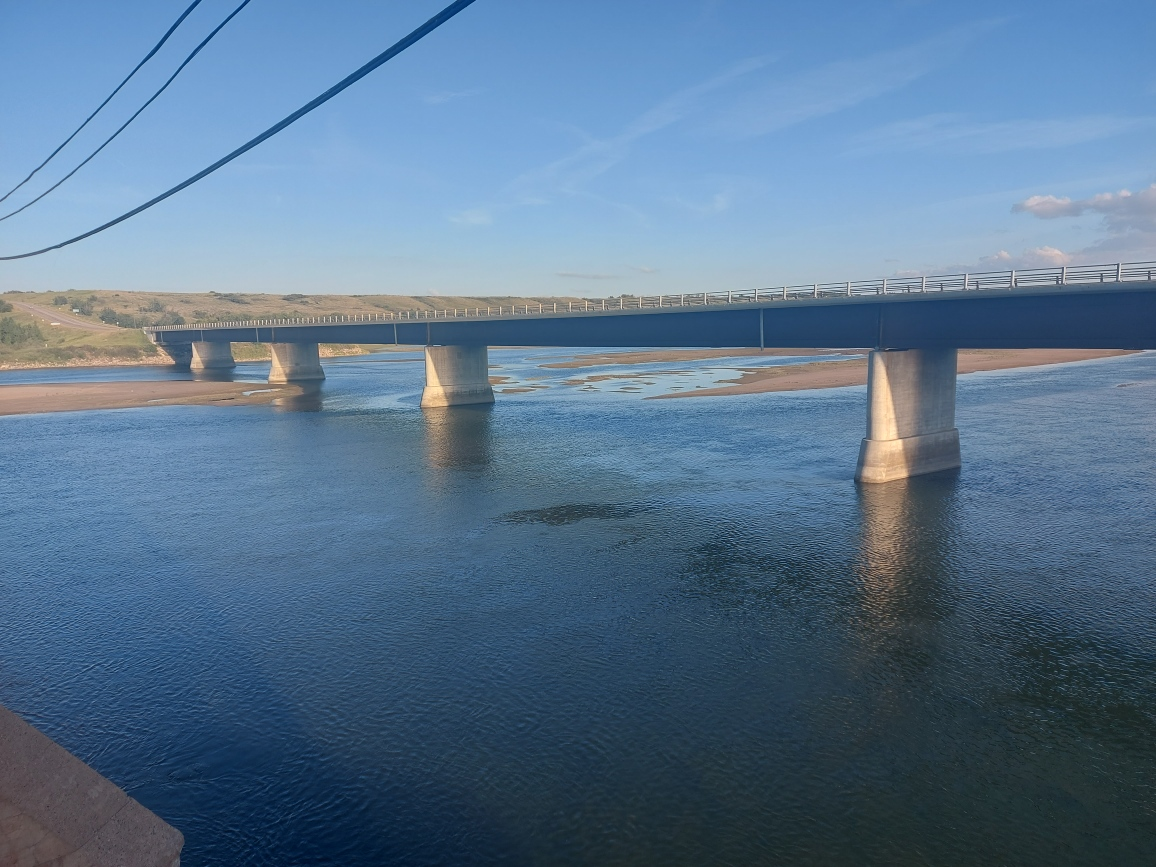
The New Outlook Bridge viewed from the old bridge

== See also ==
- List of crossings of the South Saskatchewan River
- List of bridges in Canada
