= Kelliher, Saskatchewan =

Village in Saskatchewan, Canada

Kelliher
- Village
- Village of Kelliher
- Location of Kelliher in Saskatchewan Kelliher (Canada)
- Coordinates: 51.261°N 103.740°W
- Country: Canada
- Province: Saskatchewan
- Region: Central
- Census division: 10

Government
  - Type: Municipal
  - Governing body: Kelliher Village Council
  - Mayor: Darcy King
  - Administrator: Angela Romanson

Area
  - Total: 2.81 km^{2} (1.08 sq mi)

Population (2016)
  - Total: 217
  - Density: 77.3/km^{2} (200/sq mi)
- Time zone: UTC−6 (CST)
- Postal code: S0A 1V0
- Area code: 306 639
- Highways: Highway 15
- Railways: Canadian National Railway
- Website: villageofkelliher.com

Kelliher (2016 population: 217) is a village in the Canadian province of Saskatchewan within the Rural Municipality of Kellross No. 247 and Census Division No. 10. The village is located about 140 kilometres (87 mi) north of the city of Regina.

== History ==
Kelliher incorporated as a village on 27 April 1909.

== Geography ==
=== Climate ===
Climate data for Kelliher
Month	Jan	Feb	Mar	Apr	May	Jun	Jul	Aug	Sep	Oct	Nov	Dec	Year
Record high °C (°F)	9 (48)	8 (46)	19 (66)	30.6 (87.1)	37.8 (100.0)	38 (100)	37.2 (99.0)	38.3 (100.9)	34.4 (93.9)	29.5 (85.1)	20 (68)	9.5 (49.1)	38.3 (100.9)
Mean daily maximum °C (°F)	−12 (10)	−8.2 (17.2)	−1.4 (29.5)	9.1 (48.4)	17.2 (63.0)	21.5 (70.7)	23.9 (75.0)	23.5 (74.3)	16.7 (62.1)	9.5 (49.1)	−2.2 (28.0)	−9.6 (14.7)	7.3 (45.1)
Daily mean °C (°F)	−17.2 (1.0)	−13.2 (8.2)	−6.4 (20.5)	3.2 (37.8)	10.7 (51.3)	15.3 (59.5)	17.5 (63.5)	16.6 (61.9)	10.5 (50.9)	3.9 (39.0)	−6.4 (20.5)	−14.4 (6.1)	1.7 (35.1)
Mean daily minimum °C (°F)	−22.3 (−8.1)	−18.1 (−0.6)	−11.3 (11.7)	−2.6 (27.3)	4.1 (39.4)	8.9 (48.0)	11 (52)	9.8 (49.6)	4.2 (39.6)	−1.8 (28.8)	−10.6 (12.9)	−19.1 (−2.4)	−4 (25)
Record low °C (°F)	−46.7 (−52.1)	−42.2 (−44.0)	−42.2 (−44.0)	−25.6 (−14.1)	−13 (9)	−3.3 (26.1)	0 (32)	−3.5 (25.7)	−11.1 (12.0)	−25 (−13)	−35 (−31)	−43 (−45)	−46.7 (−52.1)
Average precipitation mm (inches)	22.3 (0.88)	15.4 (0.61)	24.7 (0.97)	30.4 (1.20)	50.1 (1.97)	79.5 (3.13)	71.5 (2.81)	58.2 (2.29)	42.1 (1.66)	26.7 (1.05)	19.1 (0.75)	25.2 (0.99)	465.1 (18.31)
Source: Environment Canada

== Demographics ==
Population history (1981–2016)
Year	Pop.	±%
1981	397	—
1986	402	+1.3%
1991	368	−8.5%
1996	338	−8.2%
2001	317	−6.2%
2006	257	−18.9%
2011	216	−16.0%
2016	217	+0.5%
Source: Statistics Canada via Saskatchewan Bureau of Statistics

In the 2021 Census of Population conducted by Statistics Canada, Kelliher had a population of 244 living in 129 of its 162 total private dwellings, a change of 12.4% from its 2016 population of 217. With a land area of 2.57 km^{2} (0.99 sq mi), it had a population density of 94.9/km^{2} (245.9/sq mi) in 2021.

In the 2016 Census of Population, the Village of Kelliher recorded a population of 217 living in 123 of its 151 total private dwellings, a 0.5% change from its 2011 population of 216. With a land area of 2.81 km^{2} (1.08 sq mi), it had a population density of 77.2/km^{2} (200.0/sq mi) in 2016.

== See also ==
- List of communities in Saskatchewan
- List of francophone communities in Saskatchewan
- List of villages in Saskatchewan
