= Hubbard, Saskatchewan =

Village in Saskatchewan, Canada

Hubbard
- Village
- Village of Hubbard
- Location of Hubbard in Saskatchewan Hubbard (Canada)
- Coordinates: 51.048°N 103.463°W
- Country: Canada
- Province: Saskatchewan
- Region: Southeast
- Census division: 6
- Rural Municipality: Ituna Bon Accord No. 246

Government
  - Type: Municipal
  - Governing body: Hubbard Village Council
  - Mayor: Ron Rokosh
  - Administrator: Diane M. Olech

Area
  - Total: 1.25 km^{2} (0.48 sq mi)

Population (2016)
  - Total: 35
  - Density: 28/km^{2} (73/sq mi)
- Time zone: UTC-6 (CST)
- Postal code: S0A 1J0
- Area code: 306
- Highways: Highway 15
- Railways: Canadian National Railway

Hubbard (2016 population: 35) is a village in the Canadian province of Saskatchewan within the Rural Municipality of Ituna Bon Accord No. 246 and Census Division No. 10.

== History ==
Hubbard incorporated as a village on June 11, 1910.

== Demographics ==
Population history (1981–2016)
Year	Pop.	±%
1981	73	—
1986	79	+8.2%
1991	56	−29.1%
1996	53	−5.4%
2001	38	−28.3%
2006	43	+13.2%
2011	46	+7.0%
2016	35	−23.9%
Source: Statistics Canada via Saskatchewan Bureau of Statistics

In the 2021 Census of Population conducted by Statistics Canada, Hubbard had a population of 45 living in 20 of its 23 total private dwellings, a change of 28.6% from its 2016 population of 35. With a land area of 1.07 km^{2} (0.41 sq mi), it had a population density of 42.1/km^{2} (108.9/sq mi) in 2021.

In the 2016 Census of Population, the Village of Hubbard recorded a population of 35 living in 16 of its 16 total private dwellings, a −31.4% change from its 2011 population of 46. With a land area of 1.25 km^{2} (0.48 sq mi), it had a population density of 28.0/km^{2} (72.5/sq mi) in 2016.

== See also ==
- List of communities in Saskatchewan
- List of villages in Saskatchewan
