= Sovereign, Saskatchewan =

Community in Saskatchewan, Canada

Sovereign
- Special Service Area
- Location of Sovereign in Saskatchewan Sovereign (Canada)
- Coordinates: 51°31′00″N 107°43′02″W
- Country: Canada
- Province: Saskatchewan

Area
  - Total: 1.14 km^{2} (0.44 sq mi)

Population (2016)
  - Total: 25
  - Density: 22/km^{2} (57/sq mi)

Sovereign is a special service area within the Rural Municipality of St. Andrews No. 287, Saskatchewan, Canada. In 2016, Sovereign had a population of 25 people. It had village status prior to December 31, 2005. The community is about 26 kilometres (16 mi) south-east of the town of Rosetown on Highway 15.

== Demographics ==
In the 2021 Census of Population conducted by Statistics Canada, Sovereign had a population of 40 living in 14 of its 19 total private dwellings, a change of 60% from its 2016 population of 25. With a land area of 1.12 km^{2} (0.43 sq mi), it had a population density of 35.7/km^{2} (92.5/sq mi) in 2021.

Canada census – Sovereign, Saskatchewan community profile

	2016
Population	25 (-3.8% from 2011)
Land area	1.14 km^{2} (0.44 sq mi)
Population density	21.9/km^{2} (57/sq mi)
Median age	X (M: X, F: X)
Private dwellings	17 (total)
Median household income	$X

References: 2016

== See also ==
- List of communities in Saskatchewan
