= Rural Municipality of Wreford No. 280 =

Rural municipality in Saskatchewan, Canada

Wreford No. 280
- Rural municipality
- Rural Municipality of Wreford No. 280
- Location of the RM of Wreford No. 280 in Saskatchewan
- Coordinates: 51.499°N 105.139°W
- Country: Canada
- Province: Saskatchewan
- Census division: 11
- SARM division: 5
- Formed: December 12, 1910

Government
  - Reeve: Dean Hobman
  - Governing body: RM of Wreford No. 280 Council
  - Administrator: Melanie Rich
  - Office location: Nokomis

Area (2016)
  - Land: 798.55 km^{2} (308.32 sq mi)

Population (2016)
  - Total: 135
  - Density: 0.2/km^{2} (0.52/sq mi)
- Time zone: CST
  - Summer (DST): CST
- Postal code: S0G 3R0
- Area codes: 306 and 639
- Highway(s): Highway 15; Highway 20

The Rural Municipality of Wreford No. 280 (2016 population: 135) is a rural municipality (RM) in the Canadian province of Saskatchewan within Census Division No. 11 and SARM Division No. 5. Located in the south-central portion of the province, it is north of the city of Regina.

== History ==
The RM of Wreford No. 280 incorporated as a rural municipality on December 12, 1910.

== Geography ==
=== Communities and localities ===
The following urban municipalities are surrounded by the RM.

Towns

- Nokomis

The following unincorporated communities are within the RM.

Localities

- Ambassador
- Hatfield
- Undora
- Venn

== Demographics ==
Population history (1981–2016)
Year	Pop.	±%
1981	333	—
1986	281	−15.6%
1991	269	−4.3%
1996	232	−13.8%
2001	210	−9.5%
2006	175	−16.7%
2011	150	−14.3%
2016	135	−10.0%
Source: Statistics Canada via Saskatchewan Bureau of Statistics

In the 2021 Census of Population conducted by Statistics Canada, the RM of Wreford No. 280 had a population of 140 living in 54 of its 76 total private dwellings, a change of 3.7% from its 2016 population of 135. With a land area of 793.3 km^{2} (306.3 sq mi), it had a population density of 0.2/km^{2} (0.5/sq mi) in 2021.

In the 2016 Census of Population, the RM of Wreford No. 280 recorded a population of 135 living in 59 of its 72 total private dwellings, a −10% change from its 2011 population of 150. With a land area of 798.55 km^{2} (308.32 sq mi), it had a population density of 0.2/km^{2} (0.4/sq mi) in 2016.

== Government ==
The RM of Wreford No. 280 is governed by an elected municipal council and an appointed administrator that meets on the second Tuesday of every month. The reeve of the RM is Dean Hobman while its administrator is Melanie Rich. The RM's office is located in Nokomis.

== Transportation ==
Highway	Starting point	Communities	Ending point
Highway 15	Highway 4	Nokomis, Hatfield	Highway 16
Highway 20	Highway 3	Ambassador, Nokomis	Highway 99

== See also ==
- List of rural municipalities in Saskatchewan
