= Zealandia, Saskatchewan =

Town in Saskatchewan, Canada

Zealandia
- Town
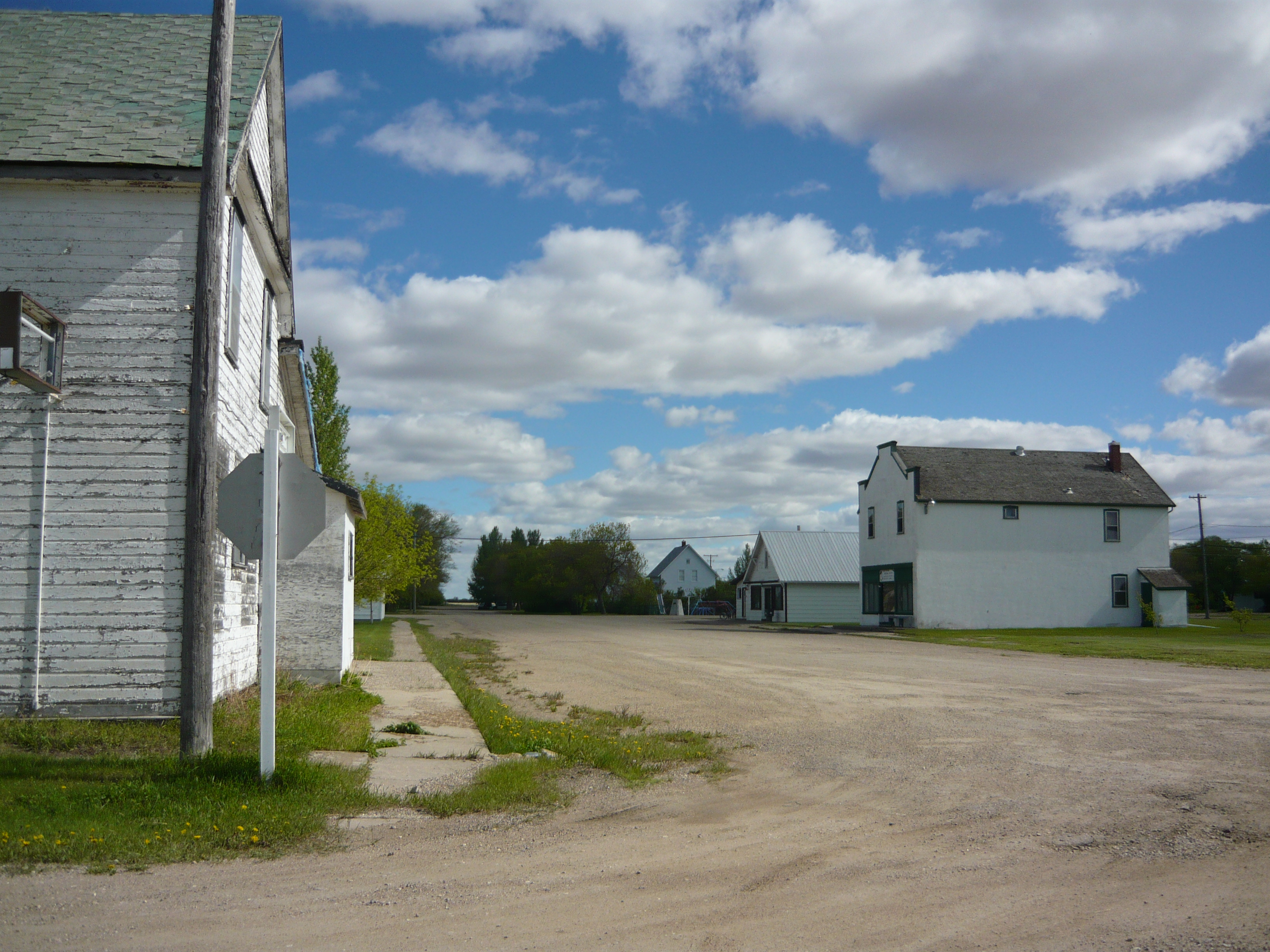
- Main Street

- Location of Zealandia in Saskatchewan Zealandia (Canada)
- Coordinates: 51.589°N 107.752°W
- Country: Canada
- Province: Saskatchewan
- Census division: 12
- Rural municipality: St. Andrews No. 287
- Post office Founded: 1906-04-01
- Incorporated (Town): 1911

Government
  - Mayor: Darren Haugen
  - Administrator: Jill Palichuk
  - Governing body: Town Council

Area
  - Total: 1.38 km^{2} (0.53 sq mi)

Population (2016)
  - Total: 80
  - Density: 57.9/km^{2} (150/sq mi)
- Time zone: CST
- Postal code: S0L 3N0
- Area code: 306
- Highways: Highway 7

Zealandia is a town in the Canadian province of Saskatchewan. It is one of the smallest communities in the province to be designated as a town.

== Demographics ==
In the 2021 Census of Population conducted by Statistics Canada, Zealandia had a population of 75 living in 38 of its 49 total private dwellings, a change of −6.3% from its 2016 population of 80. With a land area of 1.29 km^{2} (0.50 sq mi), it had a population density of 58.1/km^{2} (150.6/sq mi) in 2021.

== Notable people ==
- Aldon Wilkie (1914 – 1992), Major League Pitcher for the Pittsburgh Pirates

== See also ==
- List of communities in Saskatchewan
- List of towns in Saskatchewan
