= Birmingham, Saskatchewan =

Unincorporated community in Saskatchewan, Canada

Coordinates: 50°58′14″N 102°56′13″W

Location of Birmingham in Saskatchewan

Birmingham is an unincorporated community in the Canadian province of Saskatchewan. It is located along Highway 15 about 10 kilometres (6.2 mi) northwest of Melville, in the Rural Municipality of Stanley No. 215.

== History ==
The community was an incorporated village from 1908 to 1918 and had a post office from 1908 to 1970. It was originally settled by people from England, but they either moved on or returned to England to fight the Great War. They were replaced largely by Ukrainians.

J. D. Strumbert suggested it be named after his home town, Birmingham, England.

== See also ==
- List of communities in Saskatchewan
