= Bounty, Saskatchewan =

Community in Saskatchewan, Canada

Bounty
- Unincorporated community
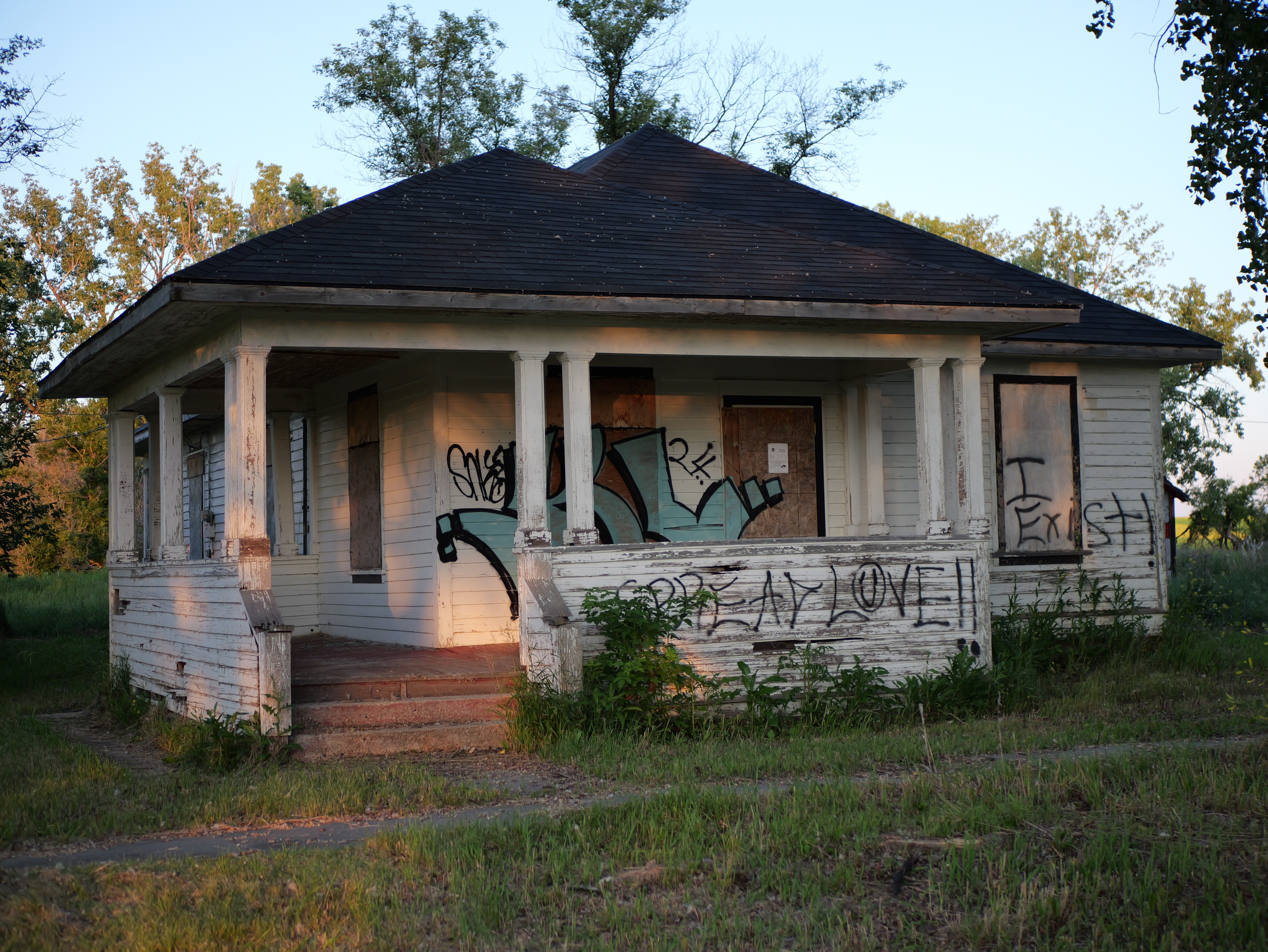

- Location within Saskatchewan Location within Canada
- Coordinates: 51°31′23″N 107°21′45″W
- Country: Canada
- Province: Saskatchewan
- Region: Southwest Saskatchewan
- Census division: 12
- Rural Municipality: Fertile Valley
- Established: 1900
- Incorporated (Village): 1904
- Restructured (Hamlet): November 25, 1997

Government
  - Type: Mayor: Spencer Meisner
  - Governing body: Fertile Valley No. 285

Area
  - Land: 1.68 km^{2} (0.65 sq mi)

Population (2001)
  - Total: 5
  - Density: 3/km^{2} (7.8/sq mi)
- Time zone: CST
- Area code: 306
- Highways: Highway 15
- Waterways: Macdonald Creek

Bounty (formerly known as Botany) is an unincorporated community in Fertile Valley No. 285 Saskatchewan, Canada. The population was 5 at the 2001 Census. It previously held the status of village until November 25, 1997. The community is located on Range Road 104 and Township Road 300, about 21 kilometres (13 mi) west of Outlook. At one time Bounty was said to have nobody living in the community.

== History ==
Prior to November 25, 1997, Bounty was incorporated as a village, and was restructured as an unincorporated community under the jurisdiction of the Rural municipality of Fertile Valley on that date.

== Demographics ==
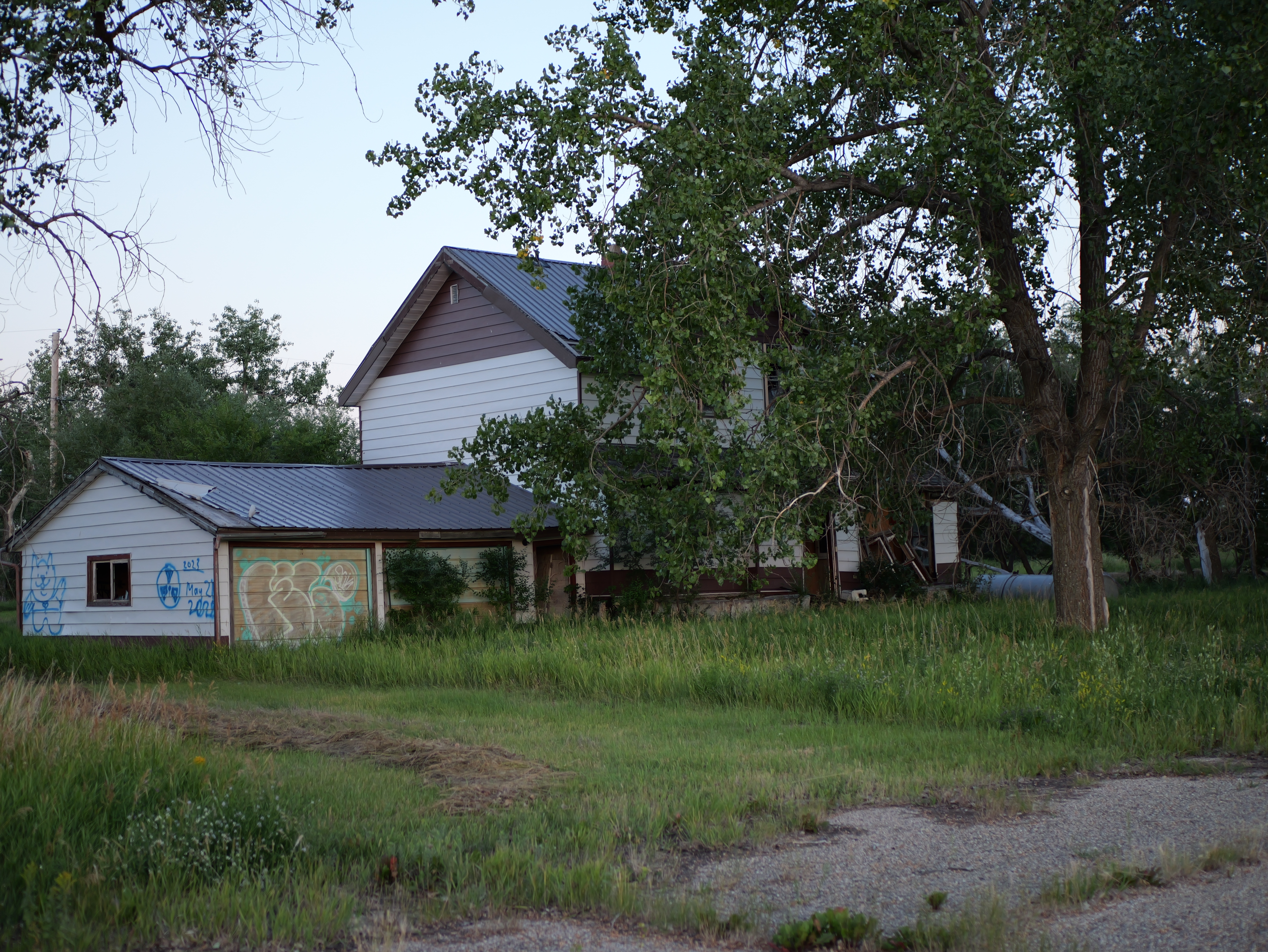
An abandoned and vandalized house on Main Street, north of the intersection with Saskatchewan Avenue

In 1996, the former Village of Bounty had a population of 18 living in six dwellings, a -35.7% decrease from 1991. The former village had a land area of 1.68 km^{2} (0.65 sq mi).

== See also ==
- List of ghost towns in Saskatchewan
- List of communities in Saskatchewan
