= Rural Municipality of St. Andrews No. 287 =

Rural municipality in Saskatchewan, Canada

St. Andrews No. 287
- Rural municipality
- Rural Municipality of St. Andrews No. 287

- Location of the RM of St. Andrews No. 287 in Saskatchewan
- Coordinates: 51.528°N 107.922°W
- Country: Canada
- Province: Saskatchewan
- Census division: 12
- SARM division: 6
- Formed: December 12, 1910

Government
  - Reeve: Geoff Legge
  - Governing body: RM of St. Andrews No. 287 Council
  - Administrator: Joan Babecy
  - Office location: Rosetown

Area (2016)
  - Land: 803.75 km^{2} (310.33 sq mi)

Population (2016)
  - Total: 522
  - Density: 0.6/km^{2} (1.6/sq mi)
- Time zone: CST
  - Summer (DST): CST
- Area codes: 306 and 639

The Rural Municipality of St. Andrews No. 287 (2016 population: 522) is a rural municipality (RM) in the Canadian province of Saskatchewan within Census Division No. 12 and SARM Division No. 6.

== History ==
The RM of St. Andrews No. 287 incorporated as a rural municipality on December 12, 1910.

== Geography ==
=== Communities and localities ===
The following urban municipalities are surrounded by the RM.

Towns

- Rosetown
- Zealandia

The following unincorporated communities are within the RM.

Special service areas

- Sovereign (dissolved as a village, December 31, 2005)

Localities

- Fortune
- Glamis
- Thrasher

== Demographics ==
Population history (1981–2016)
Year	Pop.	±%
1981	632	—
1986	654	+3.5%
1991	585	−10.6%
1996	620	+6.0%
2001	574	−7.4%
2006	582	+1.4%
2011	532	−8.6%
2016	522	−1.9%
Source: Statistics Canada via Saskatchewan Bureau of Statistics

In the 2021 Census of Population conducted by Statistics Canada, the RM of St. Andrews No. 287 had a population of 461 living in 148 of its 181 total private dwellings, a change of −11.7% from its 2016 population of 522. With a land area of 807.82 km^{2} (311.90 sq mi), it had a population density of 0.6/km^{2} (1.5/sq mi) in 2021.

In the 2016 Census of Population, the RM of St. Andrews No. 287 recorded a population of 522 living in 160 of its 179 total private dwellings, a −1.9% change from its 2011 population of 532. With a land area of 803.75 km^{2} (310.33 sq mi), it had a population density of 0.6/km^{2} (1.7/sq mi) in 2016.

== Government ==
The RM of St. Andrews No. 287 is governed by an elected municipal council and an appointed administrator that meets on the second Tuesday of every month. The reeve of the RM is Geoff Legge while its administrator is Joan Babecy. The RM's office is located in Rosetown.

== Transportation ==
- Saskatchewan Highway 7
- Rosetown Airport

== See also ==
- List of rural municipalities in Saskatchewan
