= Block settlement =

Type of land distribution to settlers with the same ethnicity

CPR land sales advertisement

A block settlement (or bloc settlement) is a particular type of land distribution which allows settlers with the same ethnicity to form small colonies. This settlement type was used throughout western Canada between the late 19th and early 20th centuries. Some were planned and others were spontaneously created by the settlers themselves. As a legacy of the block settlements, the three Prairie Provinces have several regions where ancestries other than British are the largest, unlike the norm in surrounding regions.

The policy of planned blocks was pursued primarily by Clifford Sifton during his time as Interior Minister of Canada. It was essentially a compromise position. Some politicians wanted all ethnic groups to be scattered evenly though the new lands to ensure they would quickly assimilate to Anglo-Canadian culture, while others did not want to live near "foreign" immigrants (as opposed to British immigrants who were not considered foreign) and demanded that they be segregated. At the time, Canada was receiving large numbers of non-British, non-French, immigrants for the first time, especially Italians, Germans, Scandinavians, and Ukrainians. The newcomers themselves wanted to settle as close as possible to people with a familiar language and similar customs. The government did not want the West to be fragmented into a few large homogeneous ethnic blocks, however, so several smaller colonies were set up where particular ethnic groups could settle, but these were spaced across the country.

Similar to block settlements in Canada, the United States had several Ethnic Group Settlements across the Great Plains, which were founded by European settlers across the 1880s. These were towns of Czechs, Norwegians, Germans, Russians, and religious groups that were allotted land to create homesteads and farms.

== American ==
=== Black people ===
- Amber Valley, Alberta
- Breton, Alberta
- Maidstone, Saskatchewan
- Happy Valley, British Columbia
- Saltspring Island, British Columbia
- Wildwood, Alberta

=== Mormon ===
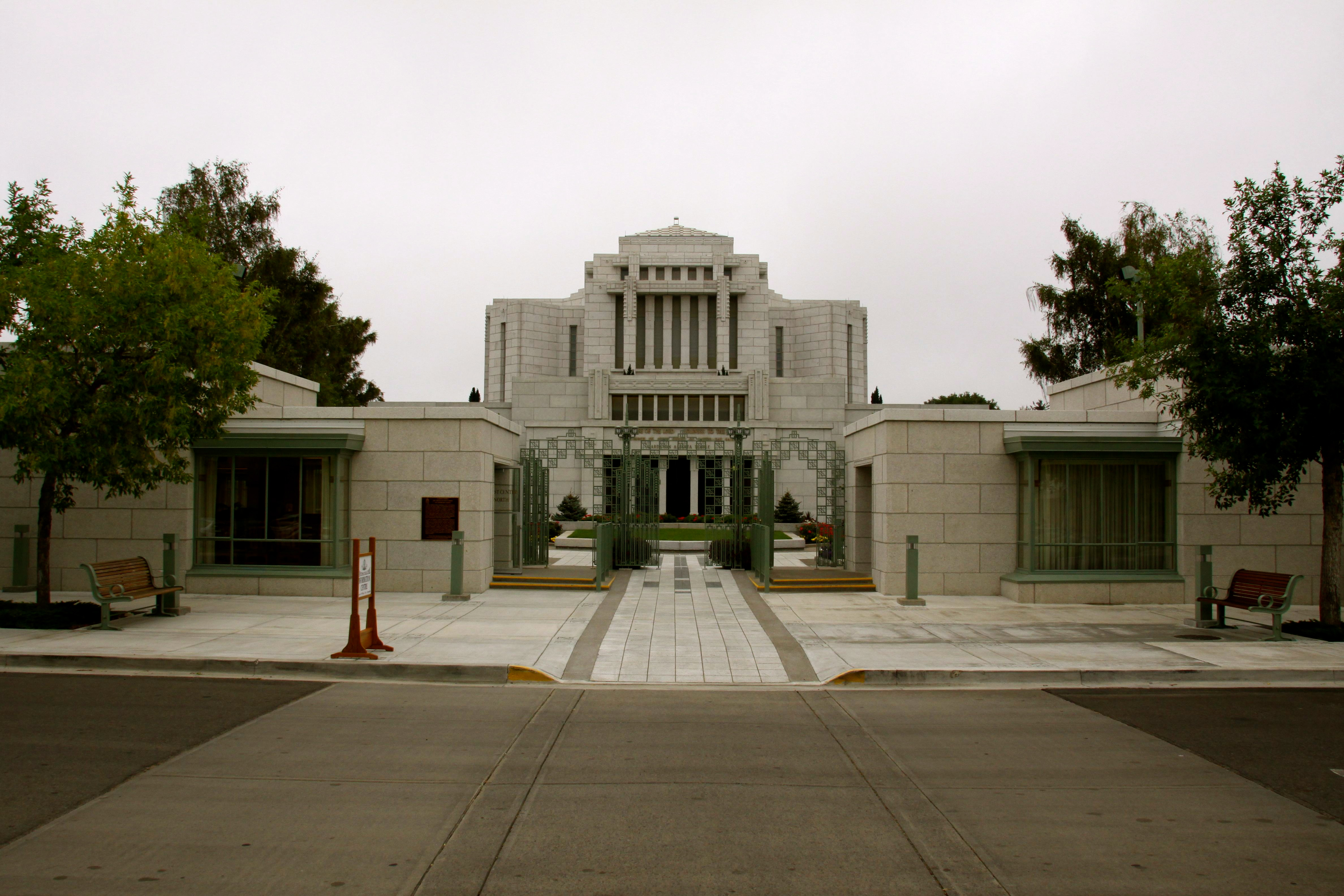
Mormon temple in Cardston, Alberta.

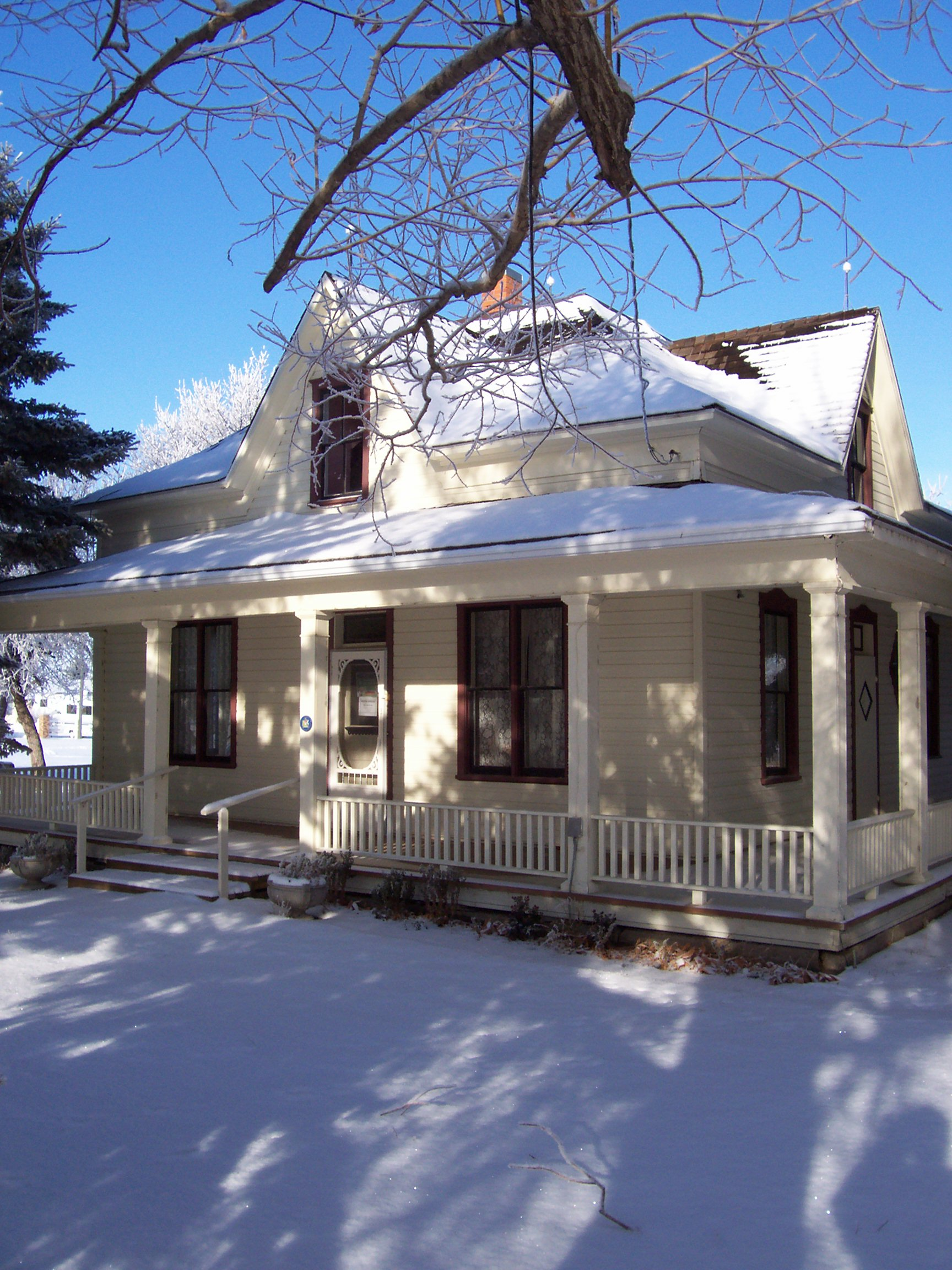
Michelsen Farmstead, museum in Stirling, Alberta

Cardston founded in 1887 was the first Latter-day Saint settlement in Alberta.

- Altorado
- Barnwell
- Bow Island
- Del Bonita
- Ensign
- Glenwood
- Hill Spring
- Jefferson
- Kimball
- Lundbreck
- Magrath
- Orton
- Pincher Creek
- Raley
- Raymond
- Seven Persons
- Stirling
- Taber
- Welling
- Woolford

== Anabaptist ==
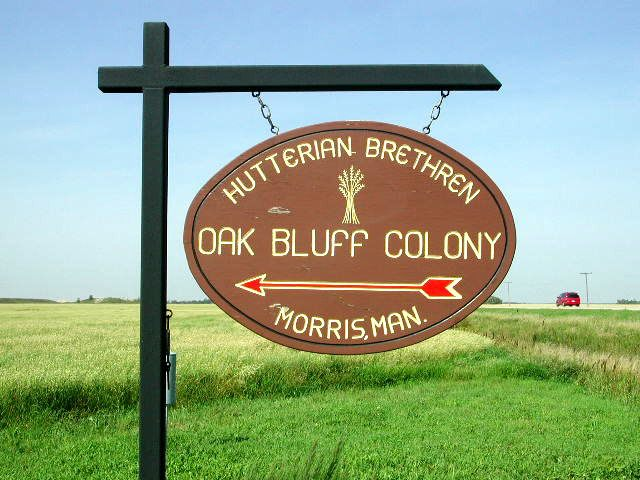
Oak Bluff Colony sign (Hutterian Brethren)

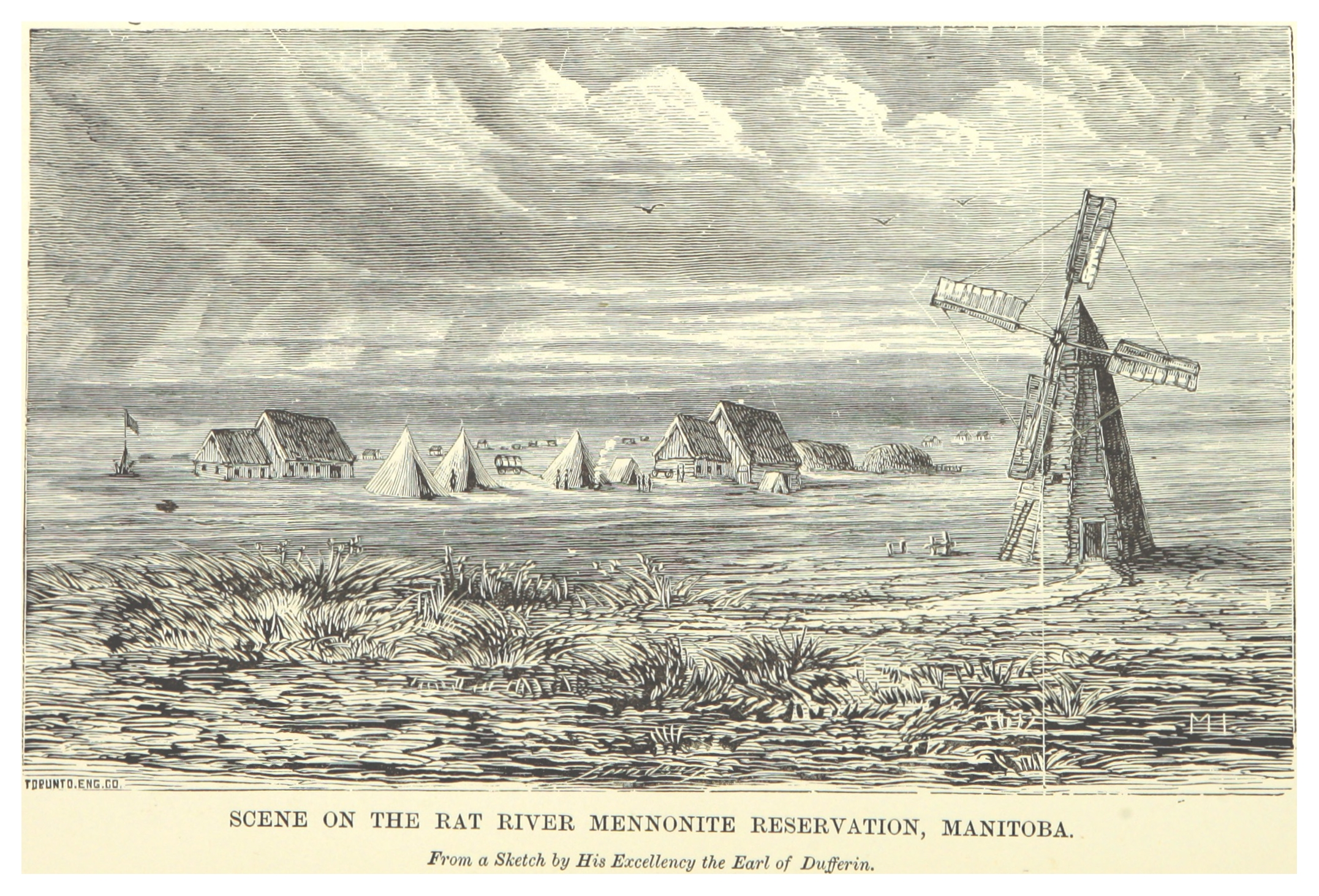
Mennonite Reserve settlement on the Rat River in Manitoba (1881)

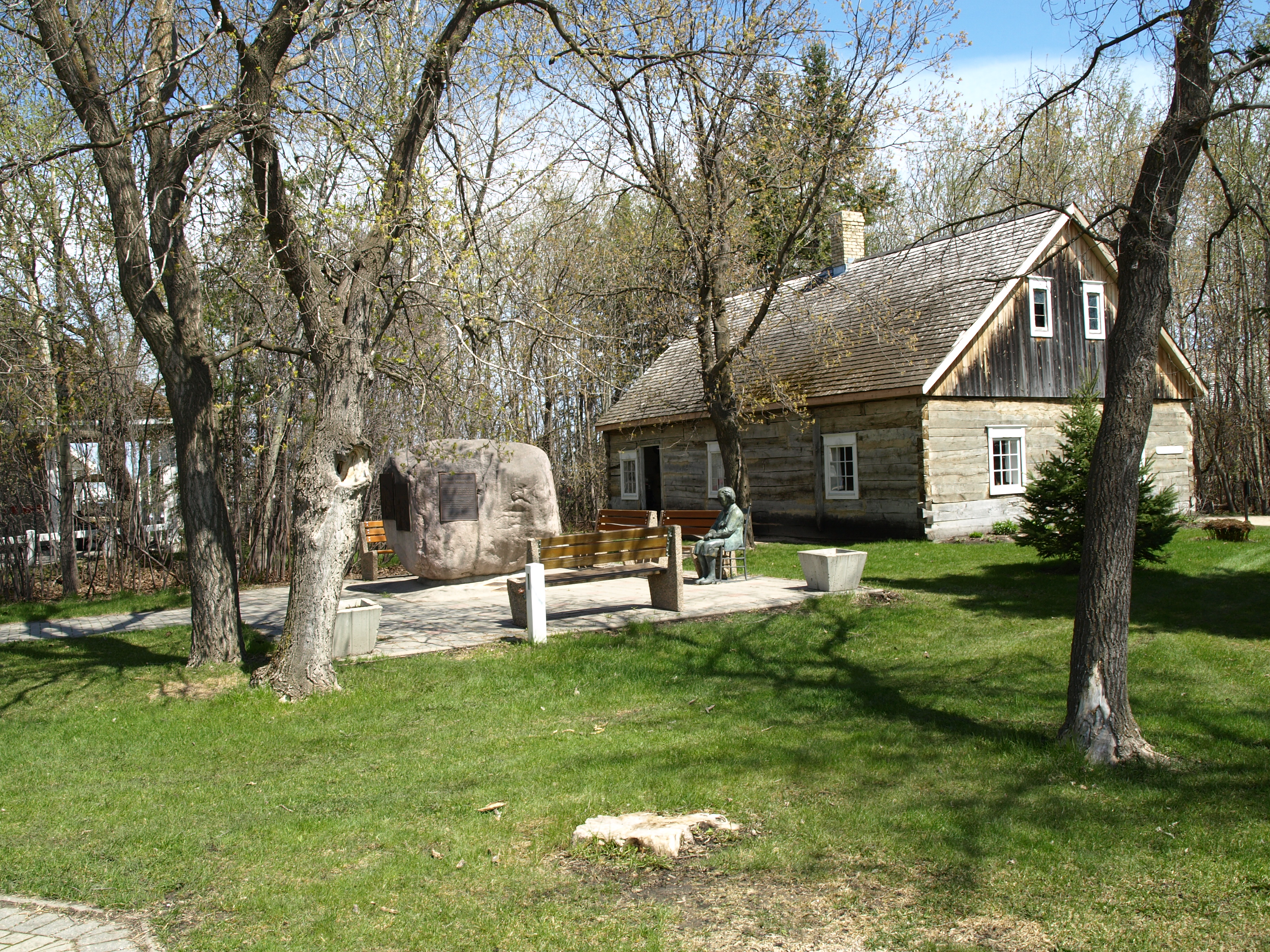
Mennonite Heritage Village in Steinbach, Manitoba

=== Hutterite ===
Hutterites are German-speaking Anabaptists who live in communal agricultural colonies. They have 188 colonies in Alberta, 117 in Manitoba, 72 in Saskatchewan and 3 in British Columbia. These Canadian colonies began with 18 colonies founded in 1919. Map

=== Mennonite ===
The Manitoba government set aside the Mennonite East Reserve now in the Rural Municipality of Hanover and the Mennonite West Reserve now in the Rural Municipality of Rhineland and the Rural Municipality of Stanley for the new Russian Mennonite immigrants coming to the province beginning in 1874. Most spoke Mennonite Low German. (Map)

Mennonite communities originally part of the East Reserve, Manitoba include:

- Steinbach, Manitoba
- Kleefeld, Manitoba
- Grunthal, Manitoba
- Blumenort, Manitoba
- Blumenhof, Manitoba
- Friedensfeld, Manitoba
- New Bothwell, Manitoba, then called Kronsthal
- Mitchell, Manitoba, then called Vollwerk
- Randolph, Manitoba, then called Chortitz

Mennonite communities originally part of the West Reserve, Manitoba include:

- Schanzenfeld, Manitoba
- Reinland, Manitoba
- Hochfeld, Manitoba
- Blumenfeld, Manitoba
- Neubergthal, Manitoba
- Altona, Manitoba
- Gretna, Manitoba
- Sommerfeld, Manitoba
- South Blumenort, Manitoba
- Reinfeld, Manitoba
- Blumengart, Manitoba
- Friedensruh, Manitoba
- Chortitz, Manitoba, not to be confused with Chortitz/Randolph, East Reserve
- Osterwick, Manitoba

Mennonite communities originally part of the Scratching River Settlement, Manitoba include:

- Rosenort, Manitoba
- Riverside, Manitoba, then called Rosenhof

Saskatchewan settlements (Map)

- Rosthern, Saskatchewan 1891–1892, Eigenheim, Laird, Waldheim, Tiefengrund.
- Osler, Saskatchewan/Hague, Saskatchewan 1895
- Langham, Dalmeny, Borden, Mennon, Hepburn
- Herbert and Swift Current, Saskatchewan 1904
- Herschel, Fiske, Kindersley and Superb 1920s
- Hanley and Dundurn districts

Early Alberta settlements began in La Crete, Alberta and Didsbury, Alberta 1901

Early British Columbia settlements began in Yarrow, British Columbia and Abbotsford, British Columbia 1911

== British ==
Meaning: people coming directly from the United Kingdom, not English-speaking people from Ontario, Atlantic Canada, or the United States.

- Lloydminster, Saskatchewan/Alberta (temperance colony)
- Walhachin, British Columbia
- Kelowna, British Columbia

=== British Canadian ===
Meaning: settlers from Eastern Canada, primarily Ontario, and mostly of British and Irish origins.

- Saskatoon (temperance colony)

== Dutch ==
- Neerlandia, Alberta

== Eastern European ==
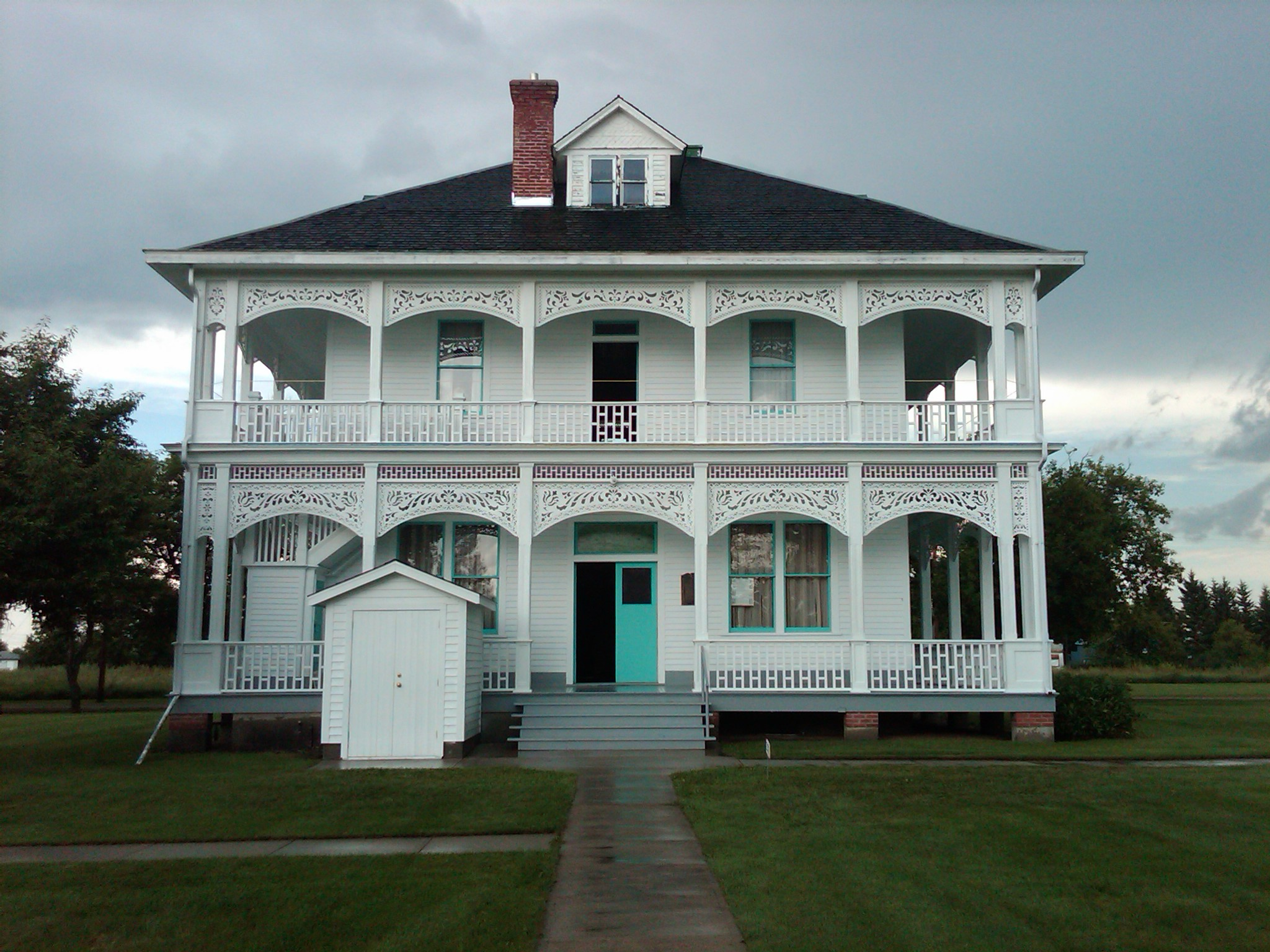
The community Doukhobor meeting house (Rusisan: dom) in Veregin is a National Historic Site.

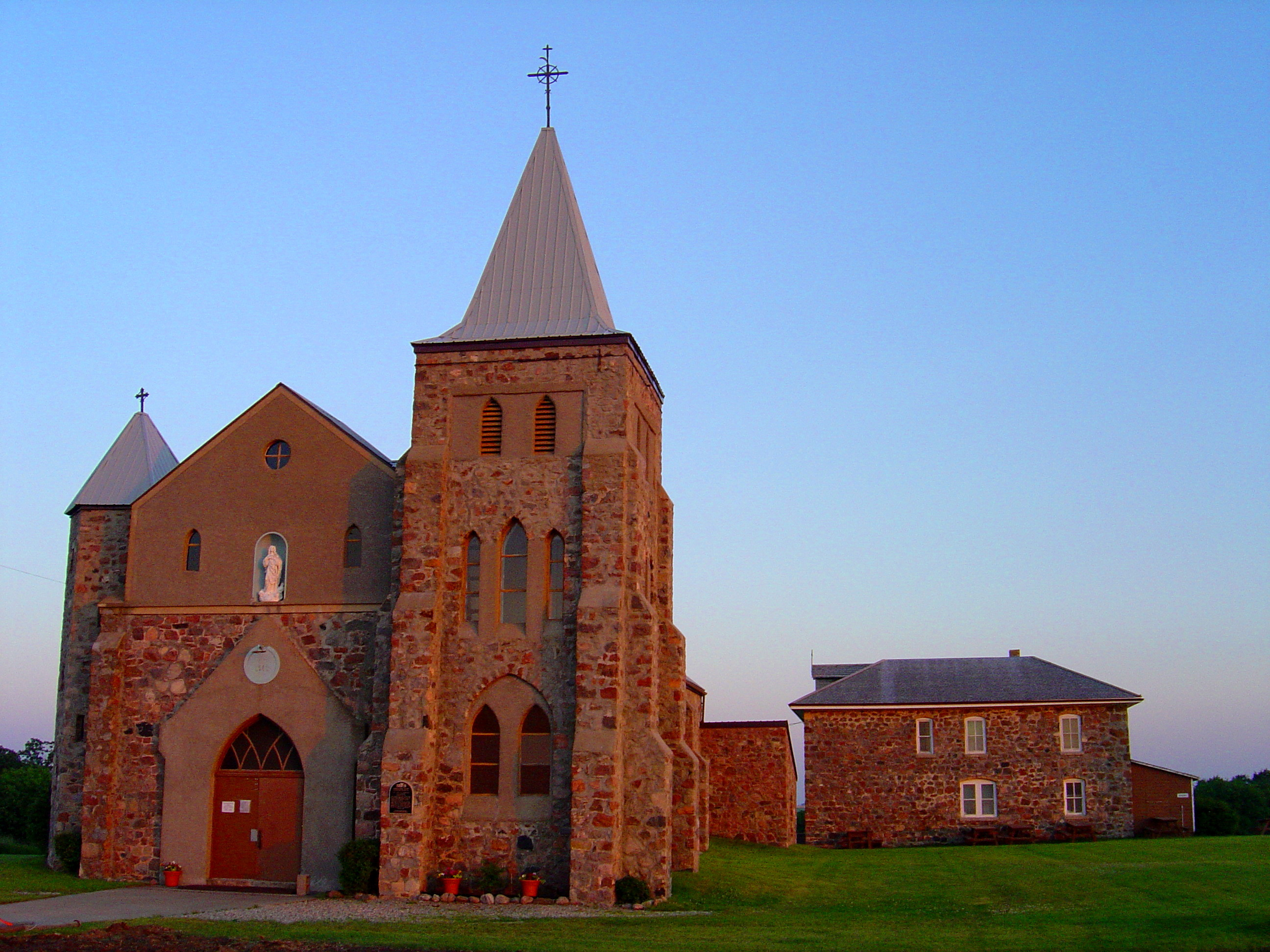
Kaposvar Church (Hungarian)

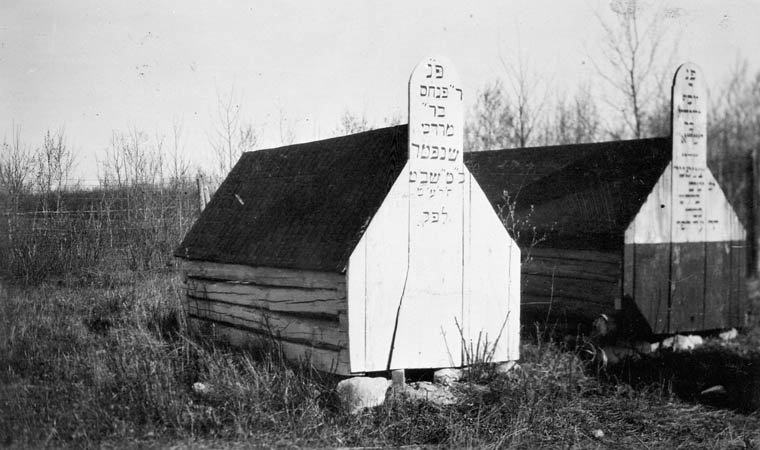
Graves in Jewish cemetery at Lipton Colony, Saskatchewan, 1916

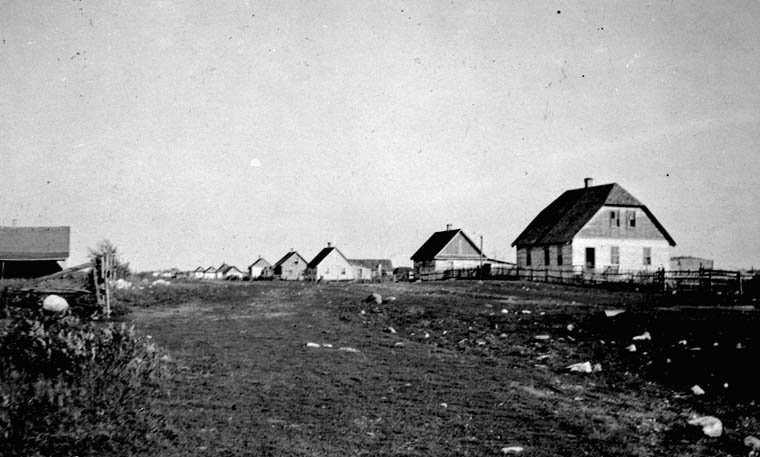
Jewish farmhouses in Bender Hamlet, Manitoba, 1921.

=== Ashkenazi Jewish ===
Many of the Jewish immigrants to Canada came from settlements in Eastern Europe, including Austria-Hungary and the Russian Empire (later the Soviet Union).

- Hirsch, Saskatchewan
- Qu'Appelle or Lipton, Saskatchewan (1901)
- Cupar, Saskatchewan (1901)
- Bender Hamlet or Narcisse, Manitoba (1903)
- La Macaza, Quebec (1904)
- Ste-Sophie, Quebec (1904)
- Sonnenfeld colony, near the hamlet of Oungre, Saskatchewan (1905)
- Edenbridge, Saskatchewan (1906), also known as Yid'n Bridge (Jews' Bridge)
- Trochu, Alberta (1906)
- Rumsey, Alberta (1906)
- Pine Ridge, Manitoba (1907)
- Birds Hill, Manitoba (1911)
- Camper, Manitoba or New Hirsch, Manitoba (1911)
- Eyre, Saskatchewan (1910)
- Montefiore, Saskatchewan (1911)
- Rosetown, Saskatchewan (1911), near the town of the same name

=== Doukhobor ===
In Saskatchewan by 1900, about 7,411 Doukhobors immigrated and settled in four blocks in the North-West Territories (now in Saskatchewan) from 1899 to 1930. They initially established 61 communal villages on 773,400 acres (3,130 km^{2}; 1,208.4 sq mi). (Map)

- North Colony (1899-1918) contained 69,000 acres (280 km^{2}; 108 sq mi) in the Pelly-Arran area settled by 2,400 settlers in 20 communal villages.(Map)
- South Colony (1899-1918) contained 215,010 acres (870.1 km^{2}; 335.95 sq mi) in the Canora, Veregin and Kamsack area settled by 3,500 settlers in 30 communal villages. (Map)
- Good Spirit Lake Annex (1899-1918) contained 168,930 acres (683.6 km^{2}; 263.95 sq mi) in the Good Spirit Lake and Buchanan area settled by 1,000 settlers in 8 communal villages. (Map)
- Saskatchewan Colony (1899-1918) contained 324,800 acres (1,314 km^{2}; 507.5 sq mi) in the Langham, Blaine Lake area settled by 1,500 settlers in 15 communal villages. (Map)
- Sheho and Insinger (1909-1926) contained 1,280 acres (5.2 km^{2}; 2.00 sq mi). (Map)
- Kylemore, Saskatchewan (1918-1938) north of Fishing Lake. (Map)
- Kelvington, Saskatchewan (1921-1938) was west of Kelvington. (Map)

British Columbia (1908-1938) (Map)

- Grand Forks-Castlegar-Slocan Valley (1909-1938) was an area of 19,000 acres (77 km^{2}; 30 sq mi) settled by 8,000 Doukhobors from Saskatchewan in 74 communal villages. (Map)
- Brilliant, British Columbia (1908-1938) on 2,700 acres (11 km^{2}; 4.2 sq mi)} included 6 communal villages. (Map)
- Ootischenia, British Columbia (1908-1938) on 2,700 acres (11 km^{2}; 4.2 sq mi) included 22 communal villages. (Map)
- Champion Creek, British Columbia (1912-1938) on 920 acres (3.7 km^{2}; 1.44 sq mi) included 5 communal villages. (Map)
- Glade, British Columbia (1911-1938) on 1,092 acres (4.42 km^{2}) included 11 communal villages. (Map)
- Shoreacres, British Columbia (1912-1938) on 500 acres (2.0 km^{2}; 0.78 sq mi) included 3 communal villages. (Map)
- Pass Creek, British Columbia (1909-1938) on 1,760 acres (7.1 km^{2}) included 6 communal villages. (Map)
- Winlaw, British Columbia (1912-1938) on 837 acres (3.39 km^{2}; 1.308 sq mi) included 4 communal villages. (Map)

Alberta

- Cowley-Lundbreck, Alberta (1915-1938) on 13,500 acres (55 km^{2}; 21.1 sq mi) included 13 communal villages.(Map)
- Arrowwood-Shouldice-Anastasia, Alberta (1926-1945) (Map)

=== Finnish ===
- Thunder Bay, Ontario
- New Finland, Saskatchewan
- Turtle Lake, Saskatchewan
- Sointula, British Columbia
- Webster's Corners, British Columbia

=== Hungarian ===
- Esterhazy, Saskatchewan (Kaposvar Colony 1886)
- Kipling, Saskatchewan

=== Old Believers ===
- Plamondon, Alberta

=== Romanian ===
- Boian, Alberta
- Assiniboia, Saskatchewan

=== Ukrainian ===
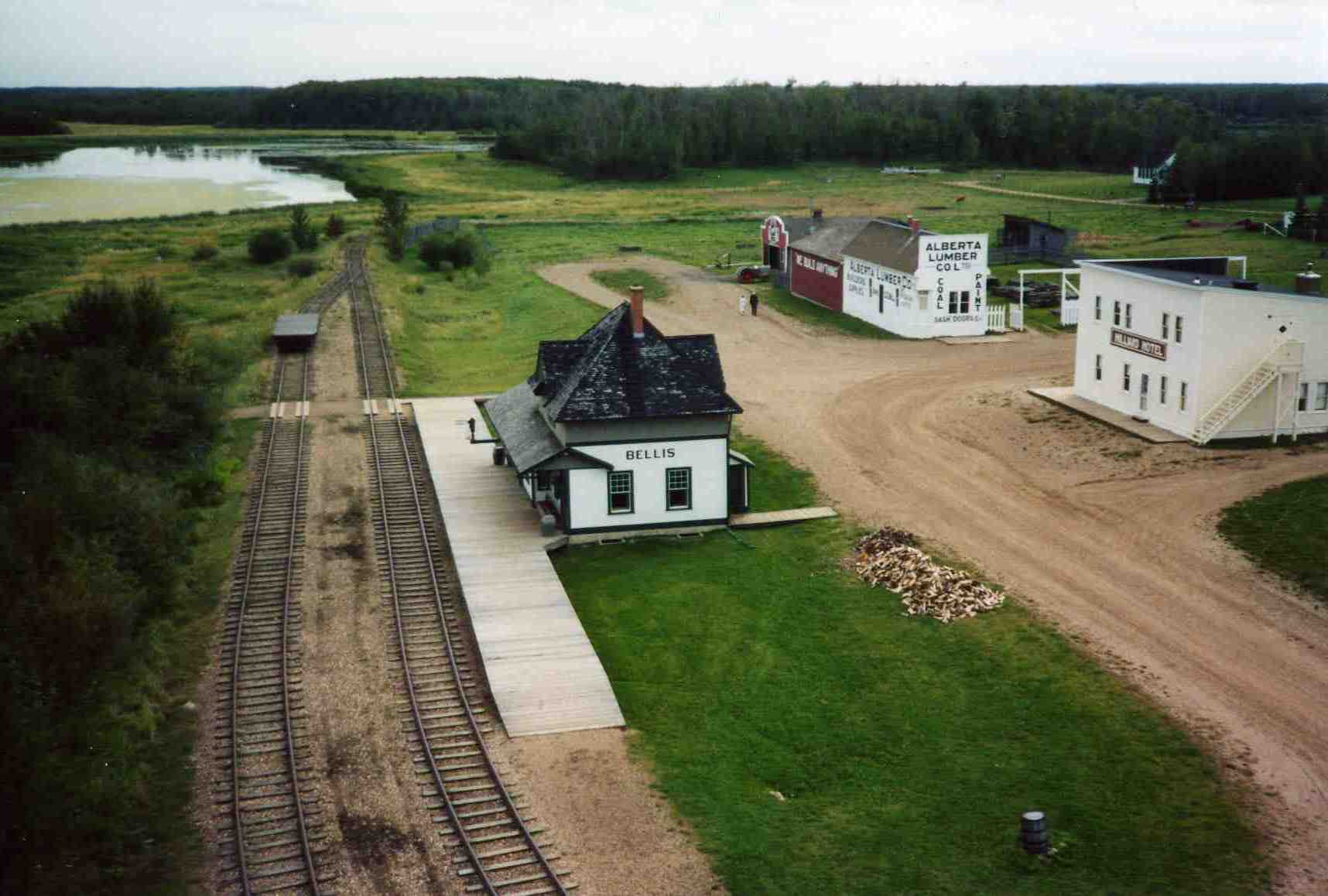
Ukrainian Cultural Heritage Village in Lamont County, Alberta

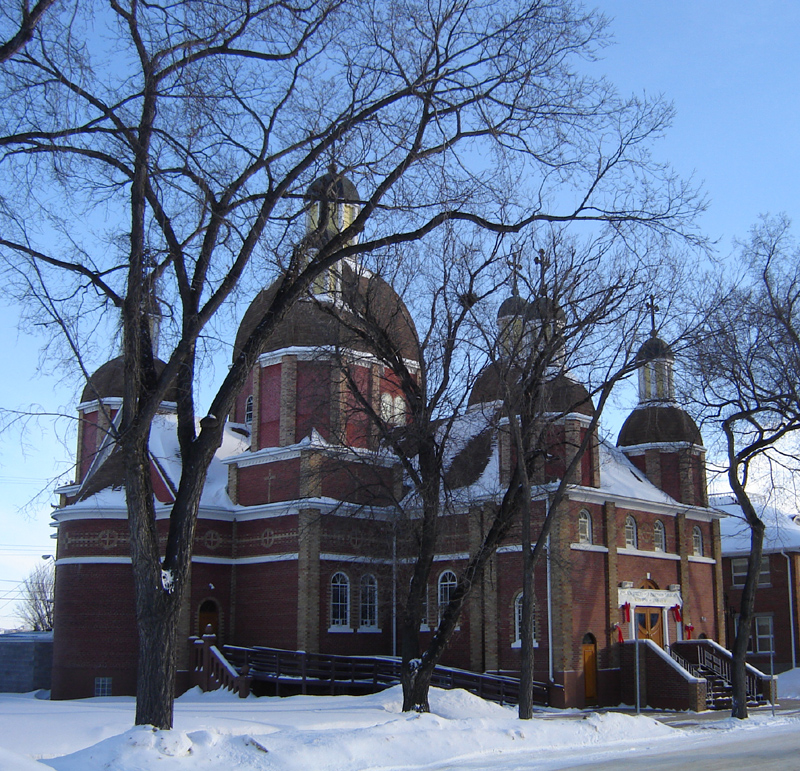
St. George's Ukrainian Catholic Cathedral, Saskatoon

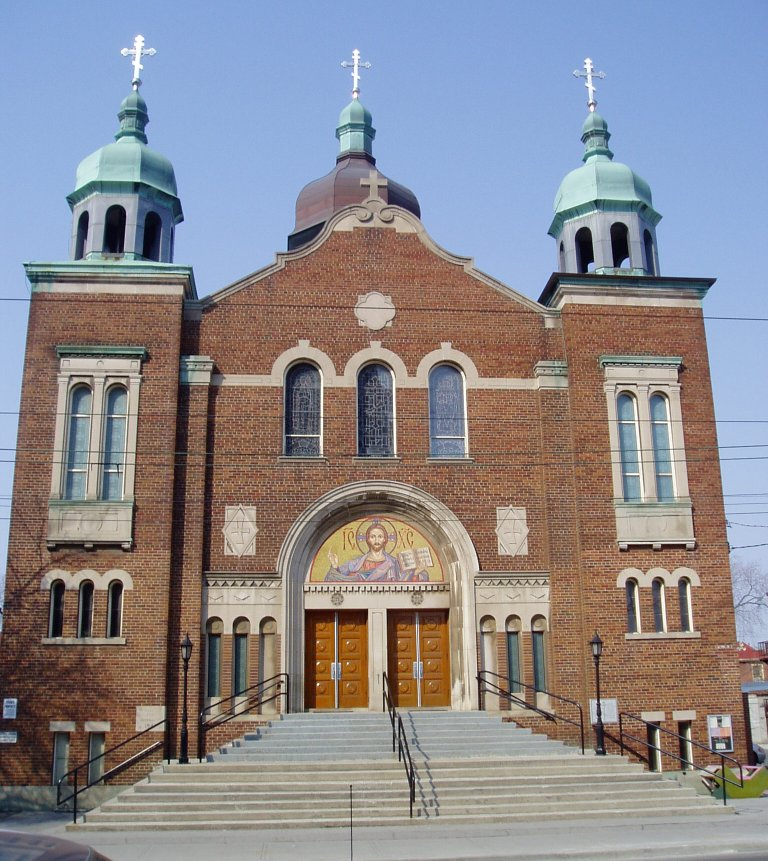
St. Volodymyr's Ukrainian Orthodox Cathedral, Old Toronto

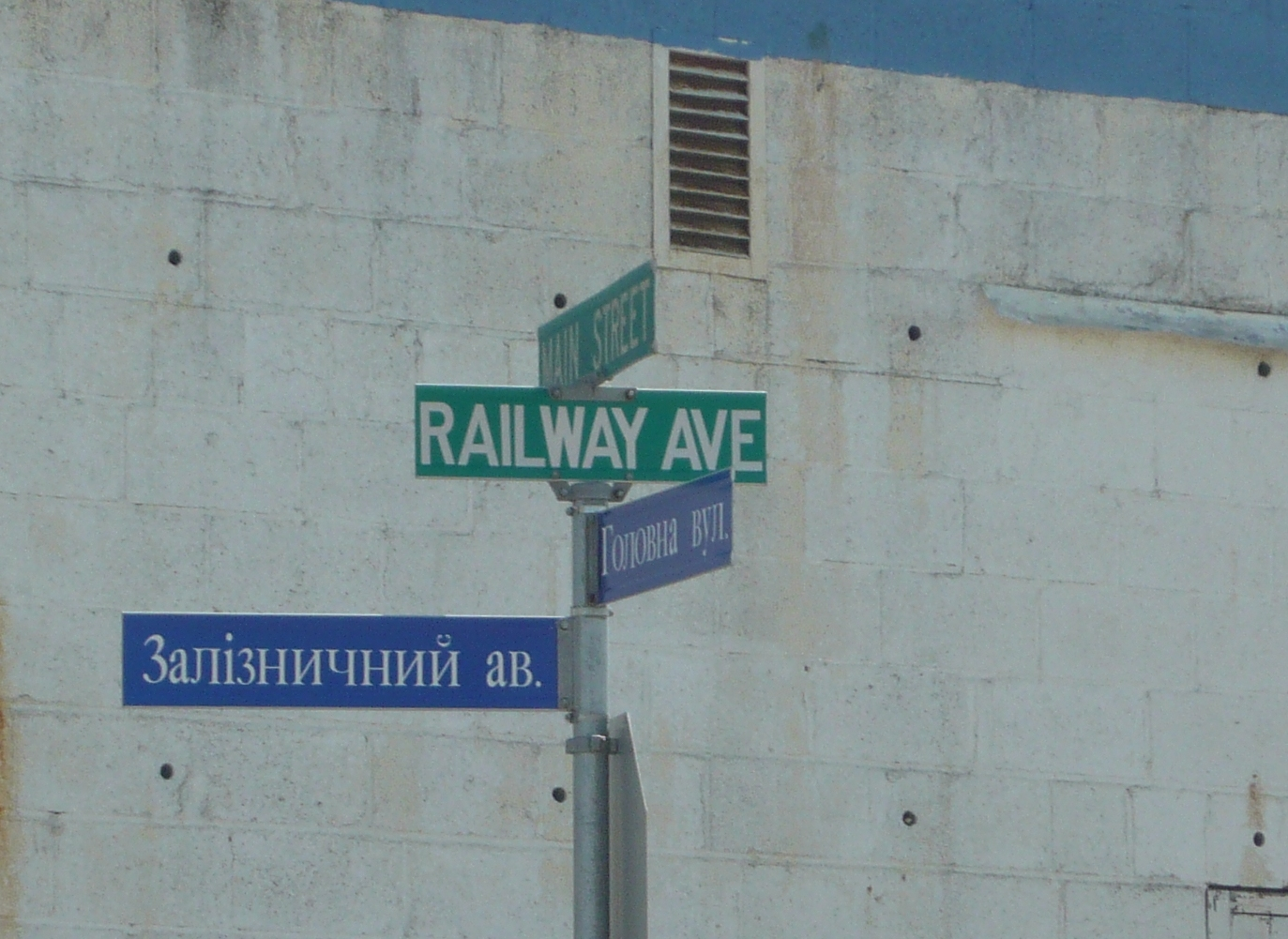
Ukrainian language street signs alongside English ones in Hafford, Saskatchewan

Ukrainian settlements with approximate date of founding (Map):

- Edna-Star, Alberta (1892). Founded by the original Ukrainian Canadian pioneers Iwan Pylypow and Wasyl Eleniak, this is the oldest and largest of the Ukrainian block settlements and was once considered the largest Ukrainian community in the world outside Eastern Europe. It is now the world's largest eco-museum, called Kalyna Country, which includes Sturgeon County, Thorhild County, the County of St. Paul No. 19, the County of Vermilion River, the County of Two Hills No. 21, the County of Minburn No. 27, Beaver County, Lamont County, and Strathcona County, and many of the neighbouring towns and cities. (Map)
- Manitoba settlements included Stuartburn, Manitoba (August 1896), Dauphin, Manitoba (September 1896). Interlake, Manitoba (June 1897), Shoal Lake, Manitoba (April 1899) and Whitemouth, Manitoba.
- Saskatchewan settlements were in the Montmartre-Candiac area (1895–96), the Yorkton–Canora–Preeceville area in eastern Saskatchewan, the Rosthern–Yellow Creek–Cudworth area north of Saskatoon and the Radisson–Hafford–Whitkow area east of North Battleford.

== French ==
These include French Canadians from Quebec, French Americans, and Francophones from France, Belgium, and Switzerland.

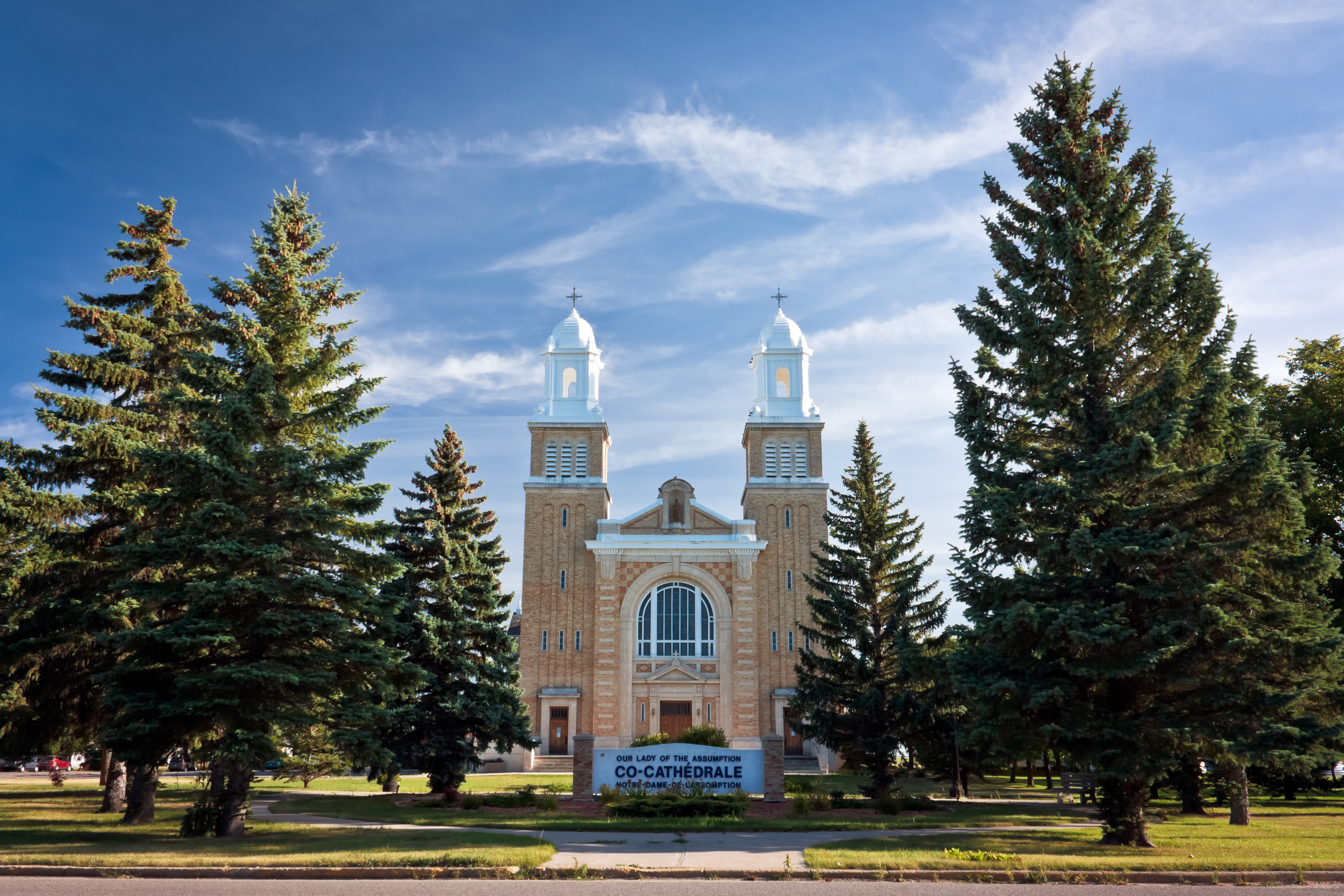
Cathedral in Gravelbourg

Alberta

- The Bonnyville and St. Paul area (Bonnyville, Cold Lake, Fort Kent, La Corey, Lafond, Mallaig, Saint Lina, Saint Vincent, Therien)
- Lac La Biche and Plamondon, Alberta
- Sturgeon County and Lac Ste. Anne County, Alberta. Specifically the communities of St. Albert, Morinville, Legal, Rivière Qui Barre, Villeneuve, Pickardville, and around the shores of Lac Ste. Anne and Lac La Nonne.
- Smokey River bloc settlement (Donnelly, Falher, Alberta, Girouxville, Guy, Jean Côté, Mac Lennan, Marie-Reine, Saint Isidore, Tangent).

British Columbia

- Maillardville, British Columbia
- Terrace, British Columbia

Manitoba

- Rat River settlement (Saint Labre, Saint Pierre Jolys, Saint-Malo)
- Red River settlement (Saint Boniface, Saint Vital, Saint Norbert, Saint Germain, Cartier, La Salle, Saint Adolphe, Glenlea, Sainte Agathe, Tourond, Aubigny, Dufrost, Saint Jean Baptiste, Sainte Elizabeth, Saint Joseph, Letellier)
- Seine River settlement (Dufresne, Giroux, Ile des Chênes, La Broquerie, Lorette, Marchand, Richer, Saint Raymond, Sainte Anne des Chênes, Sainte Genevieve)
- Whitehorse plain settlement (Elie, Fannystelle, Saint Eustache, Saint François Xavier, Saint Laurent, Saint Ambroise)

Saskatchewan

- Cantal-Bellegarde settlement (Alida, Antler, Bellegarde, Cantal, Redvers, Storthoaks, Wauchope)
- Delmas bloc settlement (Cochin, Delmas, Edam, Jackfish Lake, Vawn)
- Duck Lake settlement (Domremy, Duck Lake, Saint Isidore de Bellevue, Saint Louis)
- Gravelbourg bloc settlement (Gravelbourg, Lafleche, Mazenod, Meyronne).
- Leoville-Debden bloc (Bapaume, Big River, Debden, Laventure, Leoville, Spiritwood, Victoire)
- Ponteix settlement (Cadillac, Lac Pelletier, Pambrun, Ponteix, Vanguard)
- Prud'homme Vonda settlement (Prud'homme, Saint Denis, Vonda)
- Willow Bunch bloc settlement (Assiniboia, Fife Lake, Lisieux, Little Woody, Maxstone, Rockglen, Saint Victor, Verwood, Willow Bunch)
- Wood mountain bloc (Ferland, Glentworth, Fir mountain, Wood mountain)
- St. Hubert Mission

== German ==
German settlement began in the prairie provinces in the 1890s and continued until the 1920s during the homesteading period. Some also came to the region after the end of World War II. Canadians of German ethnicity remain numerous in the prairie provinces. Most of these settlers were Catholics and Lutherans, with minorities of Mennonites and Baptists.

- Regina, Saskatchewan and area
- Medicine Hat, Alberta - Dunmore, Alberta
- Bruderheim, Alberta - Josephburg, Alberta
- Hilda, Alberta - Schuler, Alberta
- Hussar, Alberta
- New Sarepta, Alberta
- Rolly View, Alberta
- Langenburg, Saskatchewan and Hohenlohe
- Pierceland, Saskatchewan
- Paradise Hill, Saskatchewan
- Leader, Saskatchewan
- Burstall, Saskatchewan - Richmound, Saskatchewan
- Eatonia, Saskatchewan
- Strasbourg, Saskatchewan (New Elsass German Colony)
- Macklin, Saskatchewan
- Lemberg, Saskatchewan
- Neudorf, Saskatchewan
- Heinsburg, Alberta - Lindbergh, Alberta
- St. Walburg, Saskatchewan
- Goodsoil, Saskatchewan
- Loon Lake, Saskatchewan

=== German colonies ===
St. Joseph's Colony (Katharinental) was established from 1886 to 1904 in southern Saskatchewan.

- Davin
- Rastadt
- Kronau
- Vibank
- Odessa
- Kendall

St. Joseph's Colony (Josephstal) was established in 1905 in west-central Saskatchewan. Villages in this Saskatchewan colony included

- Adanac
- Biggar
- Broadacres
- Cactus Lake
- Carmelheim
- Cavell
- Cosine
- Denzil
- Donegal
- Evesham
- Grosswerder
- Handel
- Kelfield
- Kerrobert
- Landis
- Leipzig
- Luseland
- Macklin
- Major
- Onward
- Pascal
- Phippen
- Primate
- Revenue
- Reward
- Salvador
- Scott
- Tramping Lake
- Unity
- Wilkie
- Wolfe

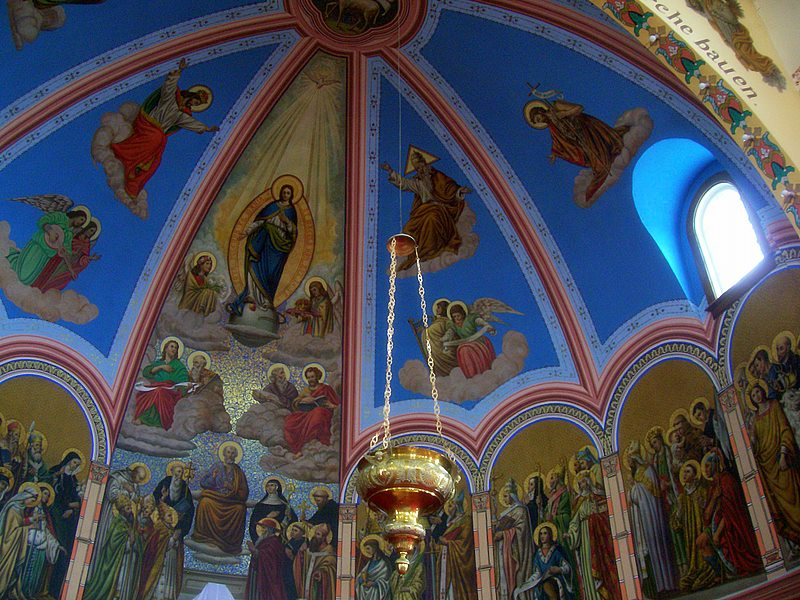
The interior of St. Peter's Cathedral in Muenster, Saskatchewan was decorated by Berthold Imhoff

St. Peter's Colony in Saskatchewan. founded in 1903 in Saskatchewan was 4,662 square kilometres (1,800 square miles) in size. It included 50 townships; townships 35 to 40, ranges 18 to 22, and townships 37 to 41, ranges 23 to 26 of the Dominion Land Survey west of the 2nd Meridian. 8,000 settlers had arrived in the colony by 1910 and by 1930 it was home to 18,000 Roman Catholics. Most were German Catholics. Between 1903 and 1925 parishes were established at

- Leofeld
- Muenster
- Fulda
- Marysburg
- Annaheim
- Englefeld
- Watson
- Lake Lenore
- Bruno
- Humboldt
- Burr
- St. Gregor
- Pilger
- St. Benedict
- Dana
- Carmel
- Cudworth
- Middle Lake
- Peterson
- Naicam

== Indigenous ==
=== Métis ===
Some French settlements were founded by Francophone Métis from the Red River settlement in Manitoba. Many began as Métis hivernants buffalo hunting camps from the 1840s to the 1870s.

- Lebret, Saskatchewan (St-Florent mission) 1866 and Val Qu'Appelle 1860s
- Touchwood Hills 1860s
- St-Laurent-Grandin Métis settlements 1868-1876
- Wood Mountain, Saskatchewan 1870s and Willow Bunch, Saskatchewan
- Lac Pelletier, Saskatchewan/ Vallée Ste-Claire 1870s
- Cypress Hills, Saskatchewan 1870s
- la-Prairie-Ronde near Dundurn, Saskatchewan 1850s
- Frenchman Butte, Saskatchewan 1880s
- Cochin, Saskatchewan 1880s
- Delmas, Saskatchewan 1880s
- St-Lazare 1880s
- Val Marie, Saskatchewan

== Scandinavian ==
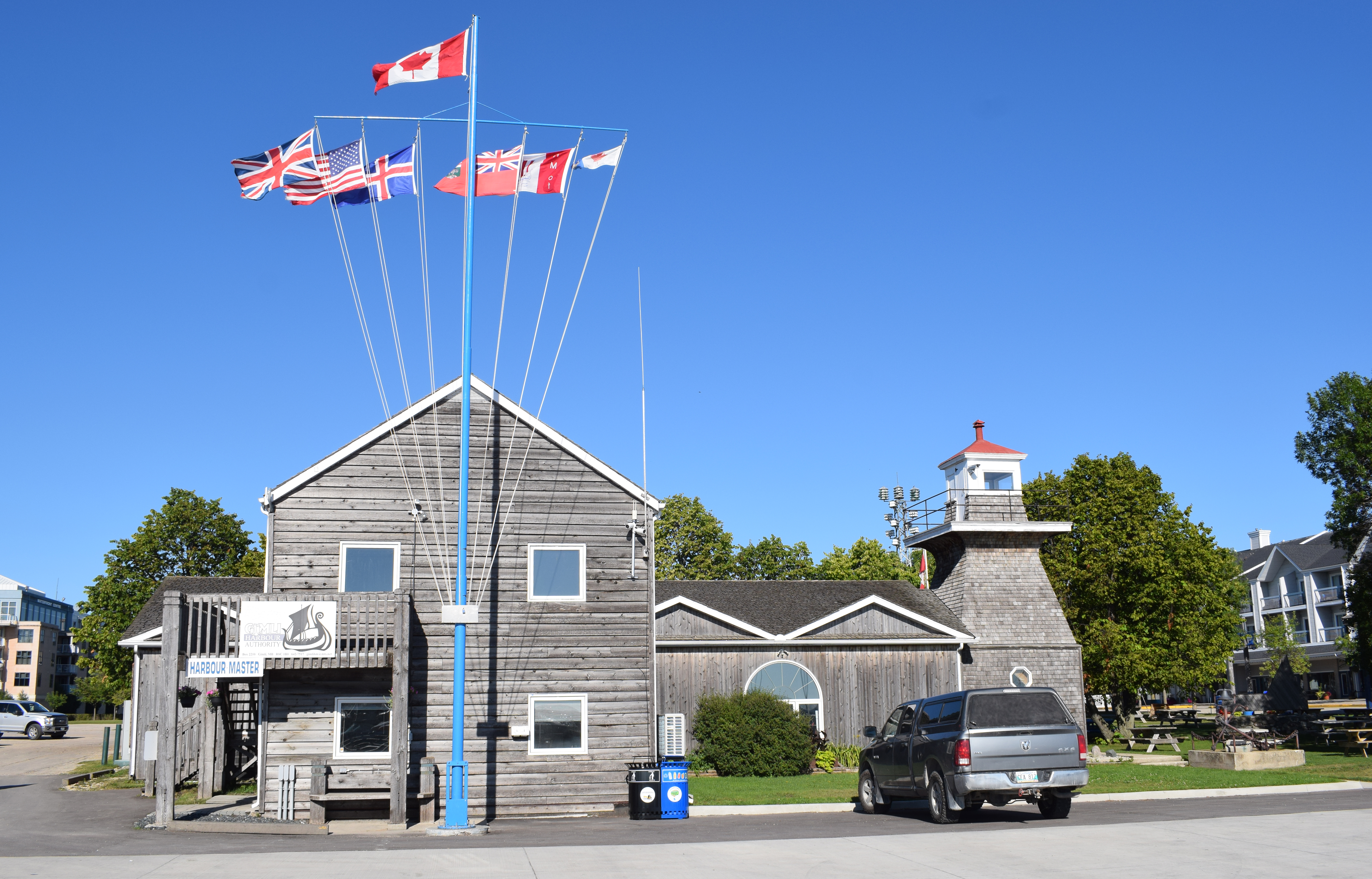
Gimli, Manitoba, pop. 5,797 is home to the largest concentration of Icelanders outside of Iceland.

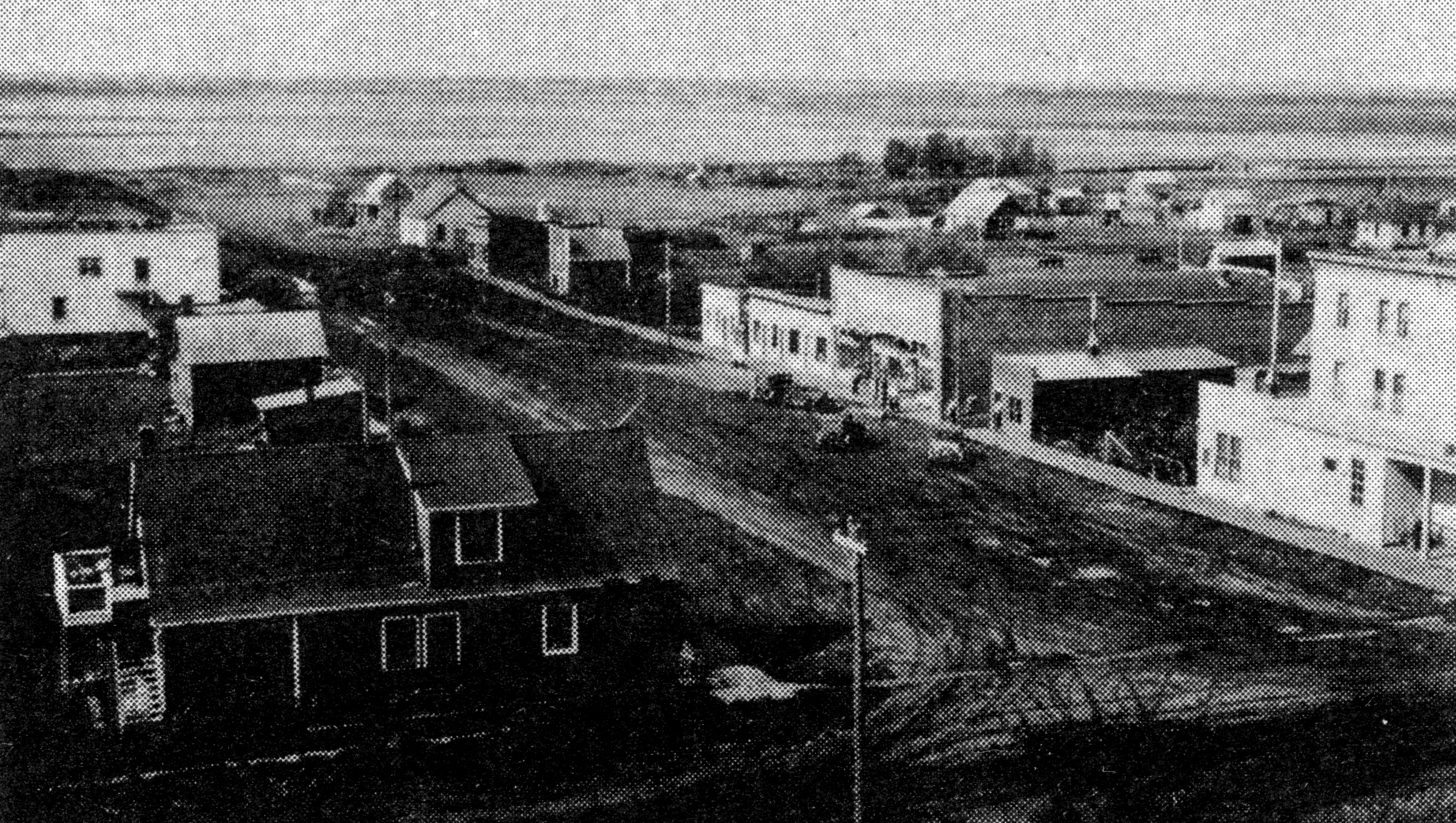
New Norway, Alberta circa 1915

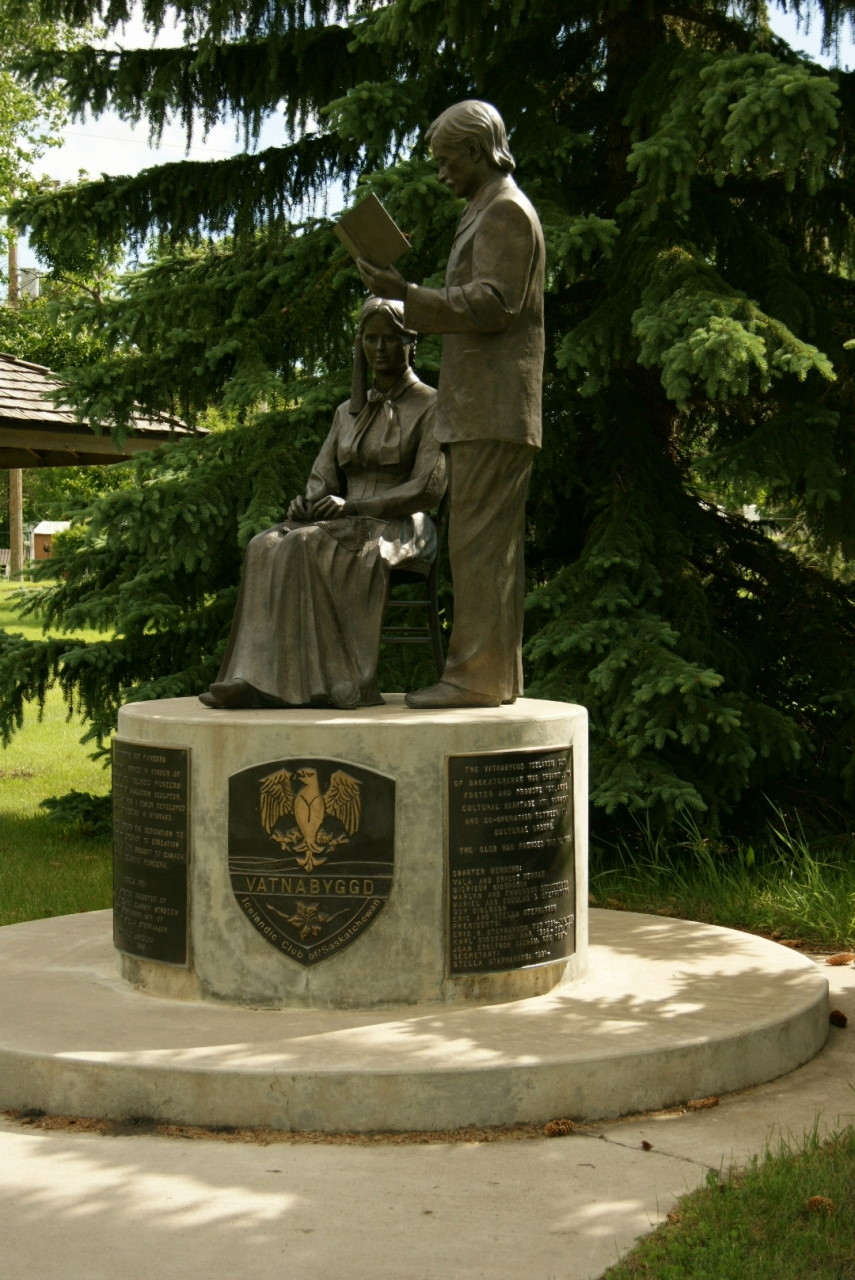
Icelandic settler statue in Elfros, Saskatchewan

=== Danish ===
- New Denmark, New Brunswick
- Danevirke Redvers, Saskatchewan
- Cape Scott, British Columbia

=== Icelandic ===
- Vatnabyggd was an Icelandic settlement of about 2,000 square kilometres in Saskatchewan south of Fishing Lake and the Quill Lakes. By 1911 it had attracted over 1,600 Icelanders. Vatnabyggd included the settlements of Kristnes, Saskatchewan (1903), Dafoe (1905), Kandahar (1905), Wynyard (1904), Mozart (1903), Elfros (1903), Leslie (1907), Holar, Saskatchewan (1905), Mount Hecla, Saskatchewan (1904) and Foam Lake (1892). (Map)
- Near Churchbridge, Saskatchewan were the settlements of Thingvalla-Logberg and Vallar
- New Iceland (Nýja Ísland) (1875-1897) was located on the southwest shore of Lake Winnipeg in Manitoba. The Rural Municipality of Gimli and the Rural Municipality of Bifrost are within the old settlement area. New Iceland contained the settlements of Gimli, Riverton, Hnausa and Arborg. (Map)
- Other Icelandic settlements in Manitoba included Baldur, Erickson, Geysir, Manitoba, Glenboro, Lakeview, Manitoba, Lundar, Morden and Reykjavik
- Markerville, Alberta

=== Norwegian ===
- Skaro, Alberta
- Birch Hills, Saskatchewan
- Torquay, Saskatchewan
- Ibsen, Saskatchewan
- Lake Alma, Saskatchewan
- Norge, Saskatchewan
- Lillestrom, Saskatchewan
- Rose Valley, Saskatchewan
- Simmie, Saskatchewan
- Leroy, Saskatchewan
- Norwegian Cove, Saskatchewan
- New Norway, Alberta
- Forestburg, Alberta
- Camrose, Alberta
- Oyen, Alberta
- Viking, Alberta
- Hagensborg, British Columbia
- Pemberton, British Columbia (originally Agerton)

=== Swedish ===
- Hilltop, Manitoba and Scandinavia, Manitoba in the Rural Municipality of Clanwilliam 1885
- New Stockholm, Saskatchewan 1886
- Percival, Saskatchewan
- Wadena, Saskatchewan
- Camrose, Alberta
- Waterville, Quebec

== See also ==
- List of named ethnic enclaves in North American cities
- Colonia (United States)
- Indian reserve
