= St. Joseph's Colony =

Former colony in Saskatchewan, Canada

- Location within Saskatchewan Location within Canada
- Coordinates: 52°3′N 108°59′W
- Country: Canada
- Province: Saskatchewan
- Time zone: UTC-6 (UTC)

St. Joseph's (Josephstal) was a colony in Saskatchewan, Canada, which comprised the towns of Adanac, Biggar, Broadacres, Cactus Lake, Carmelheim, Cavell, Cosine, Denzil, Donegal, Evesham, Grosswerder, Handel, Kelfield, Kerrobert, Landis, Leipzig, Luseland, Macklin, Major, Onward, Pascal, Phippen, Primate, Revenue, Reward, Salvador, Scott, Tramping Lake, Unity, Wilkie, and Wolfe.

== See also ==
- List of communities in Saskatchewan
