= Saskatchewan Highway 51 =

Provincial highway in Saskatchewan, Canada

Highway 51
- Highway 51 highlighted in red

Route information
- Maintained by Ministry of Highways and Infrastructure
- Length: 154.7 km (96.1 mi)

Major junctions
- West end: Highway 12 at Alberta border west of Fusilier
- Highway 21 / Highway 31 in Kerrobert
- East end: Highway 4 in Biggar

Location
- Country: Canada
- Province: Saskatchewan
- Rural municipalities: Antelope Park, Heart's Hill, Prairiedale, Progress, Grandview, Biggar
- Towns: Kerrobert, Biggar

Highway system
- Provincial highways in Saskatchewan
← Highway 49	→ Highway 52

Highway 51 is a provincial highway in the Canadian province of Saskatchewan. It runs from the Alberta border near Compeer, Alberta, where it is preceded by Highway 12, to Highway 4 in Biggar, 1.1 kilometres (0.7 mi) south of Highway 14. Highway 51 is approximately 155 kilometres (96 mi) long. It passes through the town of Kerrobert, where it shares a 2.4 km (1.5 mi) concurrency with Highway 21 and Highway 31.

== History ==
The former western terminus of Highway 51 is at Highway 656, 10.5 kilometres (6.5 mi) north of Springwater, where it met the former alignment of Highway 14. When Highway 14 was realigned between Biggar and Landis, a portion of the bypassed section was renumbered and became part of Highway 51.

In 1999, the thin membrane surface section of Highway 51 east of Kerrobert was tested with a Cold in-place recycling or "CIR" method to rehabilitate highways. This CIR process is a cost-effective method which recycles the top surface of a road. This pulverized material is mixed with asphalt emulsion and spread and compacted back onto the highway surface. This surface is then recovered with a new seal dependent on traffic volume.

== Major intersections ==
From west to east:

Rural municipality	Location	km	mi	Destinations	Notes
Antelope Park No. 322		0.0	0.0	Highway 12 west – Consort, Stettler	Continuation into Alberta
Antelope Park No. 322	Fusilier	16.7	10.4	Highway 317 south – Marengo	West end of Highway 317 concurrency
Heart's Hill No. 352 (Note: North of Highway 51); Antelope Park No. 322 (Note: South of Highway 51)		20.0	12.4	Highway 317 north – Primate	East end of Highway 317 concurrency
Heart's Hill No. 352; Prairiedale No. 321	Major	29.8	18.5	Highway 676 north – Denzil	
Heart's Hill No. 352; Prairiedale No. 321		39.5	24.5	Highway 675 south – Smiley	West end of Highway 675 concurrency
Progress No. 351		46.0	28.6	Highway 675 north – Luseland	East end of Highway 675 concurrency
Progress No. 351	Kerrobert	64.0	39.8	Highway 21 north / Highway 31 west – Unity, Macklin	West end of Highway 21 / Highway 31 concurrency
Progress No. 351	Kerrobert	66.4	41.3	Highway 21 south / Highway 31 east – Kindersley, Rosetown	East end of Highway 21 / Highway 31 concurrency
Mariposa No. 350		77.7	48.3	Highway 659 north – Broadacres, Tramping Lake	
Mariposa No. 350		87.4	54.3	Highway 658 south – Dodsland	
Grandview No. 349		100.4	62.4	Highway 657 – Handel, Plenty	West of Kelfield
Grandview No. 349		113.4	70.5	Ruthilda Access Road	
Biggar No. 347	Springwater	119.8	74.4	Highway 656 south – Herschel	West end of Highway 656 concurrency
Biggar No. 347		130.3	81.0	Highway 656 north – Handel, Landis	East end of Highway 656 concurrency
Biggar No. 347	Biggar	154.7	96.1	Highway 4 – The Battlefords, Saskatoon, Rosetown	To Highway 14
1.000 mi = 1.609 km; 1.000 km = 0.621 mi: Concurrency terminus

== See also ==
- Transportation in Saskatchewan
- Roads in Saskatchewan
