= Saskatchewan Highway 31 =

Provincial highway in Saskatchewan, Canada

Highway 31
- Highway 31 highlighted in red

Route information
- Maintained by Ministry of Highways and Infrastructure
- Length: 185.3 km (115.1 mi)

Major junctions
- West end: Highway 14 at Macklin
- Highway 21 / Highway 51 at Kerrobert
- East end: Highway 4 near Rosetown

Location
- Country: Canada
- Province: Saskatchewan
- Rural municipalities: Eye Hill, Grass Lake, Progress, Oakdale, Winslow, Mountain View, Marriott
- Towns: Macklin, Luseland, Kerrobert

Highway system
- Provincial highways in Saskatchewan
← Highway 30	→ Highway 32

Highway 31 is a provincial highway in the Canadian province of Saskatchewan. It runs from Highway 14 in Macklin to Highway 4 about 12 kilometres (7.5 mi) north of Rosetown. Highway 31 is about 185 kilometres (115 mi) long.

The portion of Highway 31 for the 23 kilometres (14 mi) between Highway 656 and Highway 4 is called Pasture Road.

== Route description ==
Highway 31 begins at Highway 14 and drops south into Macklin. From Macklin, it provides access to Macklin Lake Regional Park, crosses Eyehill Creek, and then heads south-east towards the communities of Primate, Denzil, and Salvador. This section of highway follows the Sheppard Sloughs. Continuing south-east from the sloughs, Highway 31 provides access to Luseland and then heads to the junction with Highways 21 and 51 north of Kerrobert. All three highways carry on concurrently for 2.4 kilometres (1.5 mi) into Kerrobert. Highway 51 splits off east while Highways 21 and 31 drop south for 14 kilometres (8.7 mi), at which point Highway 31 turns east.

Highway 31 travels east from 21 passing through Millerdale, Dodsland, and Druid en route to the village of Plenty, at which point it turns south for about 9.7 kilometres (6 mi) before resuming its eastward travel. The highway stays on its eastwardly course until it meets, and begins a 6.4-kilometre (4 mi) southbound concurrency with Highway 656. Near Herschel, the two highways split with 656 crossing Eagle Creek and going into Herschel while 31 turns due east until it meets Highway 4 north of Rosetown.

== Major intersections ==
From west to east:

Rural municipality	Location	km	mi	Destinations	Notes
Eye Hill No. 382	Macklin	0.0	0.0	Highway 14 to Highway 17 – Unity, Lloydminster, Camrose	Western terminus
Eye Hill No. 382	Macklin	3.5	2.2	Highway 680 south (Cosine Road)	
Eye Hill No. 382	Primate	14.5	9.0	Highway 317 south – Marengo	
Eye Hill No. 382	Denzil	26.8	16.7	Highway 676 – Major	
Grass Lake No. 381	Salvador	38.8	24.1		
Progress No. 351	Luseland	51.0	31.7	Highway 675 / Highway 771	
Progress No. 351	Kerrobert	75.4	46.9	Highway 21 north / Highway 51 west – Unity, Major	West end of Highway 21 / Highway 51 concurrency
Progress No. 351	Kerrobert	77.9	48.4	Highway 51 east – Biggar	East end of Highway 51 concurrency
Oakdale No. 320		91.5	56.9	Highway 21 south – Kindersley	East end of Highway 21 concurrency
Winslow No. 319	Dodsland	112.7	70.0	Highway 658 – Broadacres, Beadle	
Winslow No. 319		120.8	75.1	Highway 657 south – Brock	West end of Highway 657 concurrency
Winslow No. 319	Plenty	125.5	78.0	Highway 657 north – Handel	East end of Highway 657 concurrency
Mountain View No. 318	Stranraer	146.5	91.0		
Mountain View No. 318		156.5	97.2	Highway 656 north – Springwater	West end of Highway 656 concurrency
Mountain View No. 318		162.3	100.8	Highway 656 south – Herschel, Fiske	East end of Highway 656 concurrency
Marriott No. 317		185.3	115.1	Highway 4 – Biggar, Rosetown	Eastern terminus
1.000 mi = 1.609 km; 1.000 km = 0.621 mi: Concurrency terminus

== See also ==
- Transportation in Saskatchewan
- Roads in Saskatchewan
