= Saskatchewan Highway 317 =

Provincial highway in Saskatchewan, Canada

Highway 317

Route information
- Maintained by Ministry of Highways and Infrastructure
- Length: 94.0 km (58.4 mi)

Major junctions
- South end: Highway 7 near Marengo
- Highway 51 near Fusilier
- North end: Highway 31 near Primate

Location
- Country: Canada
- Province: Saskatchewan
- Rural municipalities: Milton, Antelope Park, Heart's Hill, Eye Hill

Highway system
- Provincial highways in Saskatchewan
← Highway 316	→ Highway 318

Highway 317 is a provincial highway in the Canadian province of Saskatchewan. It runs from Highway 7 near Marengo to Highway 31 near Primate. It is about 94 kilometres (58 mi).

== Route description ==
Hwy 317 begins in the Rural Municipality of Milton No. 292 at a junction with Hwy 7 just to the south of the village of Marengo, heading north along Range Road 3275 to cross a railway and travel through the eastern side of town. Leaving Marengo on gravel, it traverses a series of switchbacks to enter the Rural Municipality of Antelope Park No. 322 and immediately travels along the eastern side of Hoosier to have a junction with Hwy 772. Heading northwest, the highway regains pavement for a short distance as it travels through Fusilier, where it shares a short concurrency (overlap) with Hwy 51 and crosses a former railway line. Turning back to gravel, Hwy 317 enters the Rural Municipality of Heart's Hill No. 352 and winds its way northwest past several small lakes, including Plover Lake (where it regains pavement again), to have intersections with Hwy 680, Hwy 771, and pass through the hamlet of Cactus Lake, where it crosses a former railway line and travels just to the east of the lake of the same name. Entering the Rural Municipality of Eye Hill No. 382, the highway travels through rural farmland, passing just to the west of Grosswerder before coming to an end at an intersection with Hwy 31 just east of Primate.

== Major intersections ==
From south to north:

Rural municipality	Location	km	mi	Destinations	Notes
Milton No. 292		0.0	0.0	Highway 7 – Calgary, Alsask, Kindersley, Saskatoon	Southern terminus
Milton No. 292	Marengo	1.3	0.81	Railway Avenue	
Milton No. 292	Marengo	1.7	1.1	Southern end of unpaved section	
Antelope Park No. 322	Hoosier	18.8	11.7	Township Road 310	
Antelope Park No. 322		22.1	13.7	Highway 772 east – Smiley	
Antelope Park No. 322		23.5– 23.9	14.6– 14.9	Township Road 312 – Loverna	Former Hwy 772 west
Antelope Park No. 322	Fusilier	46.3	28.8	Highway 51 west – Consort	South end of Hwy 51 concurrency; northern end of unpaved section
↑ / ↓		49.5	30.8	Highway 51 east – Kerrobert	North end of Hwy 51 concurrency; southern end of unpaved section
Heart's Hill No. 352		60.9	37.8	Northern end of unpaved section	
Heart's Hill No. 352		71.6	44.5	Highway 680 north (Township Road 360) – Cosine	Southern terminus of Hwy 680
Heart's Hill No. 352		74.9	46.5	Highway 771 (Township Road 362) – Luseland	
Heart's Hill No. 352	Cactus Lake	78.2	48.6	Railway Avenue (Township Road 364) – Cosine	
Eye Hill No. 382	Primate	94.0	58.4	Highway 31 – Macklin, Kerrobert	Northern terminus
1.000 mi = 1.609 km; 1.000 km = 0.621 mi: Concurrency terminus

== See also ==
- Transportation in Saskatchewan
- Roads in Saskatchewan
