= Pass Creek =

Pass Creek may refer to:

== Canada ==
- Pass Creek, British Columbia, a settlement
- Pass Creek (British Columbia), a stream
- Pass Creek, a settlement in Municipal District of Greenview No. 16, Alberta

== United States ==
- Pass Creek (Elk Creek tributary), in Oregon
- Pass Creek, a tributary of the Little Bighorn River in Montana
- Pass Creek Stage Station in Wyoming
