= Fusilier, Saskatchewan =

Hamlet in Saskatchewan, Canada

Coordinates: 51°50′50″N 109°46′3″W

Fusilier is an unincorporated hamlet in the Rural Municipality of Antelope Park No. 322, Saskatchewan, Canada. The hamlet is approximately 30 kilometres (19 mi) west of the town of Kerrobert at the intersection of Highway 51 and Highway 317. The Canadian Pacific Railway played a big role in the town's economy in its early years but due to the closure of smaller branch lines in the 1980s, the tracks from Kerrobert to Fusilier were pulled and Fusilier's population began to decline.

== See also ==
- List of communities in Saskatchewan
- List of hamlets in Saskatchewan
