= Evesham (disambiguation) =

Evesham is a town in Worcestershire, England.

Evesham may also refer to:

- Evesham, the former name (e.g. in the Domesday Book) of Epsom
- Evesham (UK Parliament constituency)
- Evesham, Saint Vincent and the Grenadines, a village in Saint Vincent and the Grenadines
- Evesham, Saskatchewan, a hamlet in Saskatchewan, Canada
- Evesham Technology, a computer company based in Evesham, England
- Evesham Township, New Jersey, a township in New Jersey, United States
- Evesham United F.C., a football club based in the Worcestershire town
- Vale of Evesham, an area of southern Worcestershire
