= Salvador, Saskatchewan =

Hamlet in Saskatchewan, Canada

Salvador is a hamlet in the Rural Municipality of Grass Lake No. 381, Saskatchewan, Canada. The community had a population of 35 at the 2001 Census. It previously held the status of village until February 1, 1998. The hamlet is located 38 kilometres (24 mi) north-west of the towns of Luseland and Kerrobert on Highway 31 along the Canadian Pacific Railway subdivision.

== History ==
Prior to February 1, 1998, Salvador was incorporated as a village, and was restructured as a hamlet under the jurisdiction of the RM of Grass Lake on that date.

== See also ==
- St. Joseph's Colony, Saskatchewan
- List of communities in Saskatchewan
- List of hamlets in Saskatchewan
