= Rural Municipality of Eye Hill No. 382 =

Rural municipality in Saskatchewan, Canada

Eye Hill No. 382
- Rural municipality
- Rural Municipality of Eye Hill No. 382
- Location of the RM of Eye Hill No. 382 in Saskatchewan
- Coordinates: 52.281°N 109.776°W
- Country: Canada
- Province: Saskatchewan
- Census division: 13
- SARM division: 6
- Formed: December 12, 1910

Government
  - Reeve: Robert Brost
  - Governing body: RM of Eye Hill No. 382 Council
  - Administrator: Jason Pilat
  - Office location: Macklin

Area (2016)
  - Land: 798.3 km^{2} (308.2 sq mi)

Population (2016)
  - Total: 590
  - Density: 0.7/km^{2} (1.8/sq mi)
- Time zone: CST
  - Summer (DST): CST
- Area codes: 306 and 639

The Rural Municipality of Eye Hill No. 382 (2016 population: 590) is a rural municipality (RM) in the Canadian province of Saskatchewan within Census Division No. 13 and SARM Division No. 6. It is located in the west-central portion of the province adjacent to the Alberta boundary.

== History ==
The RM of Eye Hill No. 382 incorporated as a rural municipality on December 12, 1910.

== Geography ==
=== Communities and localities ===
The following urban municipalities are surrounded by the RM.

Towns

- Macklin

Villages

- Denzil

The following unincorporated communities are within the RM.

Special service areas

- Primate

Localities

- Evesham (dissolved as a village, August 3, 2000)
- Grosswerder
- Hillam

== Demographics ==
Population history (1981–2016)
Year	Pop.	±%
1981	801	—
1986	784	−2.1%
1991	713	−9.1%
1996	691	−3.1%
2001	700	+1.3%
2006	650	−7.1%
2011	614	−5.5%
2016	590	−3.9%
Source: Statistics Canada via Saskatchewan Bureau of Statistics

In the 2021 Census of Population conducted by Statistics Canada, the RM of Eye Hill No. 382 had a population of 552 living in 211 of its 261 total private dwellings, a change of −6.4% from its 2016 population of 590. With a land area of 775.85 km^{2} (299.56 sq mi), it had a population density of 0.7/km^{2} (1.8/sq mi) in 2021.

In the 2016 Census of Population, the RM of Eye Hill No. 382 recorded a population of 590 living in 210 of its 266 total private dwellings, a −3.9% change from its 2011 population of 614. With a land area of 798.3 km^{2} (308.2 sq mi), it had a population density of 0.7/km^{2} (1.9/sq mi) in 2016.

== Government ==
The RM of Eye Hill No. 382 is governed by an elected municipal council and an appointed administrator that meets on the first Wednesday after the first Monday of every month. The reeve of the RM is Robert Brost while its administrator is Jason Pilat. The RM's office is located in Macklin.

== Transportation ==
Rail

- CPR. Outlook Kerrobert Branch—serves Macklin, Primate, Denzil, Salvador, Luseland.
- CPR Minnedosa, Saskatoon Edmonton Section—serves Rutland, Senlac, Evesham, Macklin, Hayter, Provost

Roads

- Highway 14—serves Evesham, and Macklin.
- Highway 17—serves Macklin to Onion Lake
- Highway 317—serves Cactus Lake to Primate
- Highway 31—serves Macklin, Primate, Denzil
- Highway 676—serves Denzil to the north
