= Rural Municipality of Milton No. 292 =

Rural municipality in Saskatchewan, Canada

Milton No. 292
- Rural municipality
- Rural Municipality of Milton No. 292

- Location of the RM of Milton No. 292 in Saskatchewan
- Coordinates: 51.493°N 109.824°W
- Country: Canada
- Province: Saskatchewan
- Census division: 13
- SARM division: 6
- Formed: December 11, 1911

Government
  - Reeve: David Bond
  - Governing body: RM of Milton No. 292 Council
  - Administrator: Robin Busby
  - Office location: Marengo

Area (2016)
  - Land: 658.64 km^{2} (254.30 sq mi)

Population (2016)
  - Total: 241
  - Density: 0.4/km^{2} (1.0/sq mi)
- Time zone: CST
  - Summer (DST): CST
- Area codes: 306 and 639

The Rural Municipality of Milton No. 292 (2016 population: 241) is a rural municipality (RM) in the Canadian province of Saskatchewan within Census Division No. 13 and SARM Division No. 6. Located in the west-central portion of the province, it is adjacent to the Alberta boundary.

The name probably came from Milton, Ontario which in turn was named after the English Poet, John Milton, where the surname Milton means "mill town".

== History ==
The RM of Milton No. 292 incorporated as a rural municipality on December 11, 1911. It was previously established as the Wirral Improvement District in 1905.

== Geography ==
=== Communities and localities ===
The following urban municipalities are surrounded by the RM.

Villages

- Marengo

The following unincorporated communities are within the RM.

Special service areas

- Alsask

Localities

- Merid

== Demographics ==
Population history (1981–2016)
Year	Pop.	±%
1981	299	—
1986	289	−3.3%
1991	247	−14.5%
1996	227	−8.1%
2001	199	−12.3%
2006	181	−9.0%
2011	312	+72.4%
2016	241	−22.8%
Source: Statistics Canada via Saskatchewan Bureau of Statistics

In the 2021 Census of Population conducted by Statistics Canada, the RM of Milton No. 292 had a population of 249 living in 103 of its 135 total private dwellings, a change of −6.4% from its 2016 population of 266. With a land area of 672.17 km^{2} (259.53 sq mi), it had a population density of 0.4/km^{2} (1.0/sq mi) in 2021.

In the 2016 Census of Population, the RM of Milton No. 292 recorded a population of 241 living in 109 of its 162 total private dwellings, a −22.8% change from its 2011 population of 312. With a land area of 658.64 km^{2} (254.30 sq mi), it had a population density of 0.4/km^{2} (0.9/sq mi) in 2016.

== Government ==
The RM of Milton No. 292 is governed by an elected municipal council and an appointed administrator that meets on the second Wednesday of every month. The reeve of the RM is David Bond while its administrator is Robin Busby. The RM's office is located in Marengo.

== Transportation ==
Rail

- C.N.R. Saskatoon Calgary Branch—serves Flaxcombe, Marengo, Merid, Alsask, Sibbald
- Mantario Subdivision C.N.R—serves Kindersley, Alsask, Ardene

Roads

- Highway 7—serves Alsask
- Highway 44—serves Alsask
- Highway 317
- Francena Minerals Road, Saskatchewan
- Merid Road, Saskatchewan—comes close to Merid
