= Rural Municipality of Grandview No. 349 =

Rural municipality in Saskatchewan, Canada

Grandview No. 349
- Rural municipality
- Rural Municipality of Grandview No. 349
- Location of the RM of Grandview No. 349 in Saskatchewan
- Coordinates: 52.021°N 108.715°W
- Country: Canada
- Province: Saskatchewan
- Census division: 13
- SARM division: 6
- Formed: December 11, 1911

Government
  - Reeve: Steven Suter
  - Governing body: RM of Grandview No. 349 Council
  - Administrator: Shonda Toner
  - Office location: Kelfield

Area (2016)
  - Land: 715.38 km^{2} (276.21 sq mi)

Population (2016)
  - Total: 348
  - Density: 0.5/km^{2} (1.3/sq mi)
- Time zone: CST
  - Summer (DST): CST
- Area codes: 306 and 639

The Rural Municipality of Grandview No. 349 (2016 population: 348) is a rural municipality (RM) in the Canadian province of Saskatchewan within Census Division No. 13 and SARM Division No. 6.

== History ==
The RM of Grandview No. 349 incorporated as a rural municipality on December 11, 1911.

== Geography ==
=== Communities and localities ===
The following urban municipalities are surrounded by the RM.

Villages

- Ruthilda

The following unincorporated communities are within the RM.

Localities

- Handel (dissolved as a village, January 1, 2007)
- Kelfield (dissolved as a village)

== Demographics ==
Population history (1981–2016)
Year	Pop.	±%
1981	478	—
1986	532	+11.3%
1991	503	−5.5%
1996	480	−4.6%
2001	422	−12.1%
2006	355	−15.9%
2011	340	−4.2%
2016	348	+2.4%
Source: Statistics Canada via Saskatchewan Bureau of Statistics

In the 2021 Census of Population conducted by Statistics Canada, the RM of Grandview No. 349 had a population of 230 living in 98 of its 120 total private dwellings, a change of −33.9% from its 2016 population of 348. With a land area of 709.49 km^{2} (273.94 sq mi), it had a population density of 0.3/km^{2} (0.8/sq mi) in 2021.

In the 2016 Census of Population, the RM of Grandview No. 349 recorded a population of 348 living in 104 of its 116 total private dwellings, a −0.6% change from its 2011 population of 350. With a land area of 715.38 km^{2} (276.21 sq mi), it had a population density of 0.5/km^{2} (1.3/sq mi) in 2016.

== Attractions ==
- Biggar Museum
- Dodsland & District Museum
- Plenty & District Museum
- Opuntia Lake National Migratory Bird Sanctuary

== Government ==
The RM of Grandview No. 349 is governed by an elected municipal council and an appointed administrator that meets on the first Wednesday after the third day of every month. The reeve of the RM is Steven Suter while its administrator is Shonda Toner. The RM's office is located in Kelfield.

== Transportation ==
- Saskatchewan Highway 51
- Saskatchewan Highway 657
- Saskatchewan Highway 659
- Biggar Airport

== See also ==
- List of rural municipalities in Saskatchewan
