= Donald Oborowsky =

Canadian businessman and philanthropist

- Born: February 14, 1949 (age 77); Cactus Lake, Saskatchewan
- Occupation: Businessman
- Years active: 1971-present
- Known for: CEO of Waiward Steel Fabricators
- Spouse: Judy Oborowsky (m. 1970; died 2025)
- Children: 2

Donald Oborowsky (born February 14, 1949) is a Canadian businessman and philanthropist, based in Edmonton, Alberta.

== History ==
Oborowsky was raised in Cactus Lake, Saskatchewan. Choosing not to complete high school, he left home at the age of seventeen and relocated to Edmonton, Alberta in 1966. That same year, he commenced his apprenticeship as a carpenter at the Northern Alberta Institute of Technology, at the initiative of his employer, a small, residential building contractor. Following work as a carpenter, he obtained employment as a steel fitter, leaving his carpentry apprenticeship program after three and a half years. In 1971, at the age of twenty-two, he co-founded, with Theodore Degner, Waiward Steel Fabricators Ltd. and became the company's Chief Executive Officer. The company, owned as of 2015 by the Hillcore Group, a Canadian investment firm, grew to include approximately 800 employees and is regarded as one of the largest privately owned automated industrial steel fabrication facilities in Canada. The company is also recognized as a Platinum Member of Canada's Best Managed Companies, a recognition program sponsored by Deloitte, where the company has qualified by being so honoured for at least seven consecutive years.

Oborowsky has had a long history of governance and leadership roles with post-secondary educational institutions. He was named as a member of the Business Advisory Council of the Alberta School of Business, located within the University of Alberta. He was also a member of the Board of Governors of the Northern Alberta Institute of Technology from 2002 to 2008, and is identified as one of the institution's "Top 50 Alumni".

In 2007, at the age of fifty-eight, Oborowsky wrote the examinations to complete his long interrupted carpentry apprenticeship and obtained his Red Seal certificate.

Oborowsky's philanthropic activities include initial and ongoing support of the Alberta Diabetes Foundation. He, with others, also contributed $1 million to establish the Waiward Centre for Steel Technologies at the Northern Alberta Institute of Technology.
