= Rural Municipality of Grass Lake No. 381 =

Rural municipality in Saskatchewan, Canada

Grass Lake No. 381
- Rural municipality
- Rural Municipality of Grass Lake No. 381
- Location of the RM of Grass Lake No. 381 in Saskatchewan
- Coordinates: 52.275°N 109.368°W
- Country: Canada
- Province: Saskatchewan
- Census division: 13
- SARM division: 6
- Formed: December 13, 1909

Government
  - Reeve: Scott Vetter
  - Governing body: RM of Grass Lake No. 381 Council
  - Administrator: Theresa Poschenrieder
  - Office location: Luseland

Area (2016)
  - Land: 801.29 km^{2} (309.38 sq mi)

Population (2016)
  - Total: 399
  - Density: 0.5/km^{2} (1.3/sq mi)
- Time zone: CST
  - Summer (DST): CST
- Area codes: 306 and 639

The Rural Municipality of Grass Lake No. 381 (2016 population: 399) is a rural municipality (RM) in the Canadian province of Saskatchewan within Census Division No. 13 and SARM Division No. 6.

== History ==
The RM of Grass Lake No. 381 incorporated as a rural municipality on December 13, 1909.

== Geography ==
=== Communities and localities ===
The following unincorporated communities are within the RM.

Localities

- Baljennie
- Donegal
- Reward
- Salvador
- Sunnyglen

== Demographics ==
Population history (1981–2016)
Year	Pop.	±%
1981	665	—
1986	652	−2.0%
1991	560	−14.1%
1996	553	−1.2%
2001	525	−5.1%
2006	433	−17.5%
2011	369	−14.8%
2016	399	+8.1%
Source: Statistics Canada via Saskatchewan Bureau of Statistics

In the 2021 Census of Population conducted by Statistics Canada, the RM of Grass Lake No. 381 had a population of 389 living in 160 of its 183 total private dwellings, a change of −2.5% from its 2016 population of 399. With a land area of 772.9 km^{2} (298.4 sq mi), it had a population density of 0.5/km^{2} (1.3/sq mi) in 2021.

In the 2016 Census of Population, the RM of Grass Lake No. 381 recorded a population of 399 living in 159 of its 207 total private dwellings, a 8.1% change from its 2011 population of 369. With a land area of 801.29 km^{2} (309.38 sq mi), it had a population density of 0.5/km^{2} (1.3/sq mi) in 2016.

== Government ==
The RM of Grass Lake No. 381 is governed by an elected municipal council and an appointed administrator that meets on the first Tuesday of every month. The reeve of the RM is Scott Vetter while its administrator is Theresa Poschenrieder. The RM's office is located in Luseland.

== Transportation ==
- Saskatchewan Highway 14
- Saskatchewan Highway 21
- Saskatchewan Highway 31
- Saskatchewan Highway 675

== See also ==
- List of rural municipalities in Saskatchewan
