= Cactus Lake, Saskatchewan =

Hamlet in Saskatchewan, Canada

Coordinates: 52°06′51″N 109°48′54″W

Cactus Lake was a small Saskatchewan hamlet located about 8 kilometres (5.0 mi) from the Alberta–Saskatchewan border in the Rural Municipality of Heart's Hill No. 352. Nearby communities include Macklin, Luseland, and Major. Access is from Highway 317.

The histories of the families of Cactus Lake and surrounding communities are detailed in Prairie Legacy: Grosswerder and Surrounding Districts, by the Grosswerder and Districts New Horizons Heritage Group, published in 1980.

== Notable people ==
Notable people from Cactus Lake include:

- Donald Oborowsky, president and chief executive officer of Edmonton-based Waiward Steel Fabricators, Ltd.
- Fr. Ronald Rolheiser, president of the Oblate School of Theology in San Antonio, Texas and author of numerous books including The Holy Longing which was a best seller.

== See also ==
- List of communities in Saskatchewan
