= Adanac, Saskatchewan =

Community in Saskatchewan, Canada

Adanac
- Hamlet
- Location of Adanac Adanac (Canada)
- Coordinates: 52°27′10″N 109°03′23″W
- Country: Canada
- Province: Saskatchewan
- Region: East-central
- Rural municipality: Round Valley No. 410
- Post Office Established: 1908-02-01 (Closed 1985-08-16)

Population (2009)Reported By SaskHealth
  - Total: 2
- Time zone: CST
- Area code: 306

Adanac (Canada spelled in reverse) is a small farming hamlet in the Rural Municipality of Round Valley No. 410, Saskatchewan, Canada. The hamlet is located at the intersection of Highway 14 and Range Road 221, approximately 5 kilometres (3.1 mi) east of the town of Unity.

== See also ==
- St. Joseph's Colony, Saskatchewan
- List of communities in Saskatchewan
- List of hamlets in Saskatchewan
- List of geographic names derived from anagrams and ananyms
