= Champion Creek, British Columbia =

Coordinates: 49°13′N 117°40′W

Champion Creek is a ghost town located in the West Kootenay region of British Columbia. It is a former Doukhobor settlement. The town is near Champion Creek on the east side of Columbia River, between Trail and Castlegar.

== History ==
A 920-acre area at the confluence of Champion Creek and the Columbia River was purchased in 1912 by Doukhobors from Saskatchewan. They named the area Blagondatnoe and established five unnamed communal villages, which included barns, a blacksmith shop, granaries, a planer mill, and a saw mill. They cleared forests and planted gardens and orchards. The community went into decline in 1937 following the demise of the Christian Community of Universal Brotherhood. By 1963, the villages had been abandoned and the land sold.

== See also ==
- List of ghost towns in British Columbia
