= Pass Creek (British Columbia) =

River in British Columbia, Canada

Coordinates: 49°11′01″N 118°26′32″W

Pass Creek is a creek located in the Boundary Country region of British Columbia. It flows into the Granby River 11 miles north of Grand Forks, British Columbia. Pass Creek has been mined for gold.
