= Rural Municipality of Heart's Hill No. 352 =

Rural municipality in Saskatchewan, Canada

Heart's Hill No. 352
- Rural municipality
- Rural Municipality of Heart's Hill No. 352
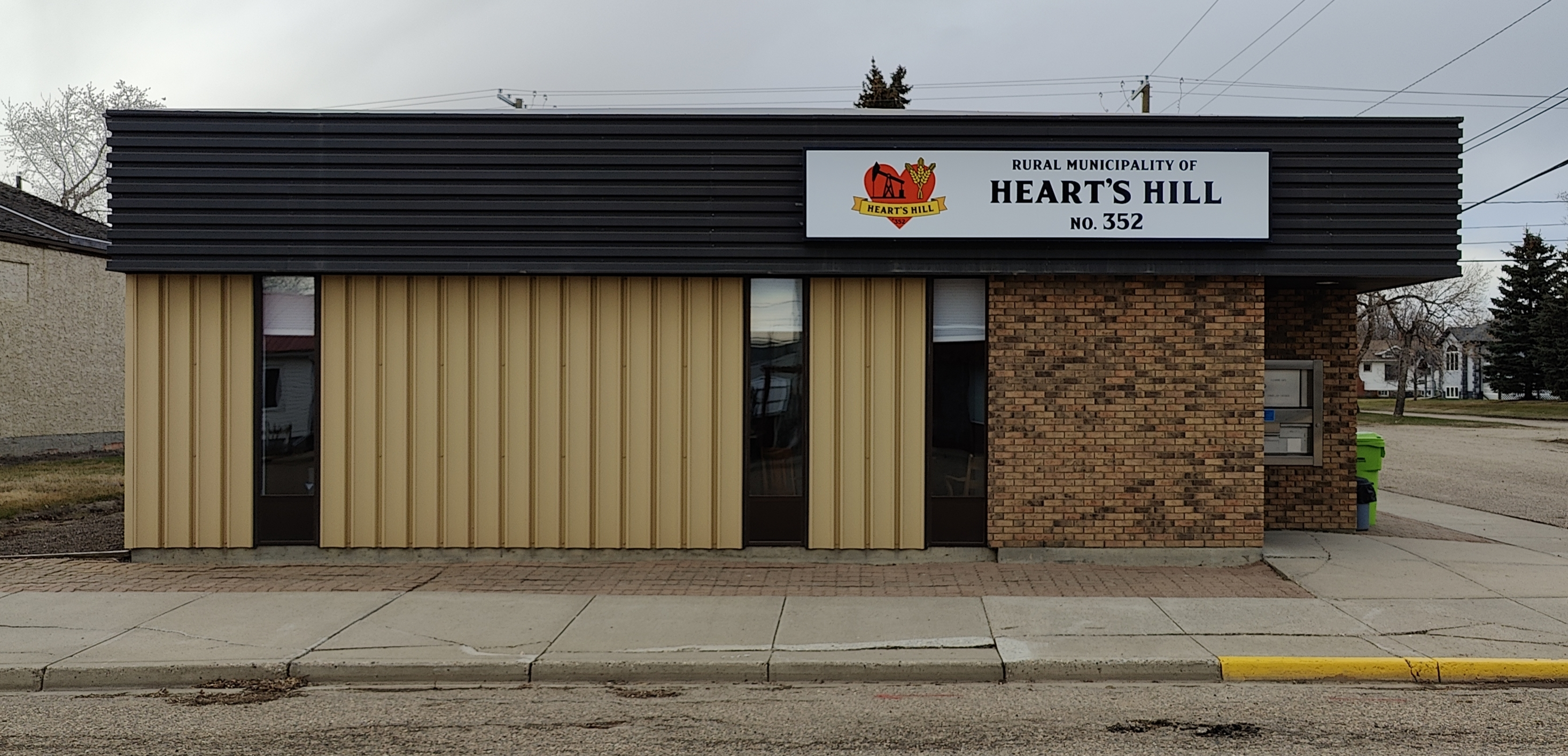
- Municipal office in Luseland

- Location of the RM of Heart's Hill No. 352 in Saskatchewan
- Coordinates: 52.011°N 109.785°W
- Country: Canada
- Province: Saskatchewan
- Census division: 13
- SARM division: 6
- Formed: November 15, 1910

Government
  - Reeve: Gordon Stang
  - Governing body: RM of Heart's Hill No. 352 Council
  - Administrator: Calvin Giggs
  - Office location: Luseland

Area (2016)
  - Land: 838.37 km^{2} (323.70 sq mi)

Population (2016)
  - Total: 244
  - Density: 0.3/km^{2} (0.78/sq mi)
- Time zone: CST
  - Summer (DST): CST
- Area codes: 306 and 639

The Rural Municipality of Heart's Hill No. 352 (2016 population: 244) is a rural municipality (RM) in the Canadian province of Saskatchewan within Census Division No. 13 and SARM Division No. 6. Located in the west-central portion of the province, it is adjacent to the Alberta boundary.

== History ==
The RM of Heart's Hill No. 352 incorporated as a rural municipality on November 15, 1910.

== Geography ==
=== Communities and localities ===
The following unincorporated communities are within the RM.

Localities

- Cactus Lake
- Cosine
- Hearts Hill

== Demographics ==
Population history (1981–2016)
Year	Pop.	±%
1981	552	—
1986	507	−8.2%
1991	410	−19.1%
1996	359	−12.4%
2001	307	−14.5%
2006	285	−7.2%
2011	260	−8.8%
2016	244	−6.2%
Source: Statistics Canada via Saskatchewan Bureau of Statistics

In the 2021 Census of Population conducted by Statistics Canada, the RM of Heart's Hill No. 352 had a population of 234 living in 92 of its 116 total private dwellings, a change of −4.1% from its 2016 population of 244. With a land area of 826.01 km^{2} (318.92 sq mi), it had a population density of 0.3/km^{2} (0.7/sq mi) in 2021.

In the 2016 Census of Population, the RM of Heart's Hill No. 352 recorded a population of 244 living in 91 of its 112 total private dwellings, a −6.2% change from its 2011 population of 260. With a land area of 838.37 km^{2} (323.70 sq mi), it had a population density of 0.3/km^{2} (0.8/sq mi) in 2016.

== Government ==
The RM of Heart's Hill No. 352 is governed by an elected municipal council and an appointed administrator that meets on the first Thursday after the first Monday of every month. The reeve of the RM is Gordon Stang while its administrator is Calvin Giggs. The RM's office is located in Luseland.

== Transportation ==
- Highway 771
- Highway 317
