= Cavell, Saskatchewan =

Community in Saskatchewan, Canada

Cavell
- Hamlet
- Location of Cavell in Saskatchewan
- Coordinates: 52.258°N 108.588°W
- Country: Canada
- Province: Saskatchewan
- Rural Municipality: Rural Municipality of Reford No. 379
- Village status: Prior to January 1, 1943
- Time zone: UTC-6 (CST)

Cavell is a hamlet in the Rural Municipality of Reford No. 379, Saskatchewan, Canada. It previously held the status of a village until January 1, 1943.

== History ==
Prior to January 1, 1943, Cavell was incorporated as a village, and was restructured as a hamlet under the jurisdiction of the Rural Municipality of Reford No. 379 on that date.

== See also ==
- St. Joseph's Colony, Saskatchewan
- List of communities in Saskatchewan
- List of hamlets in Saskatchewan
