= Pass Creek, British Columbia =

Coordinates: 49.3889°N 117.6793°W

Pass Creek is an unincorporated community on the east side of Norns (formerly Pass) Creek in the West Kootenay region of southeastern British Columbia. The rural neighbourhood on Pass Creek Rd is about 11 kilometres (7 mi) north of Castlegar.

== Creek ==
The settlement name derives from the original name of the creek. A low pass northeast of the creek leads to Goose Creek and access to the Slocan and Kootenay rivers. First Nations used this route for thousands of years. In 1997, residents and regional district representatives overwhelmingly rejected the suggestion to reinstate the historic name of the creek.

== Doukhobors ==
During 1909–1910 the Doukhobors bought 1,322 acres. Named Dolina Lugovaya (meadow valley in Russian), this later shortened to Lugovoye (meadow). During 1912–1913 they bought 440 acres, which was named Kartoshnoye (from potato). The colony established three communal villages. Established in 1909, the cemetery is mostly Doukhobor interments, but is now available to the general public. In 1922, the Pass Creek school was built. Following a declining population from 1938 onward, the land was sold and the villages disbanded in the early 1960s.

== Present community ==
Pass Creek has a fire department, cemetery, community hall, neighbourhood association, bed and breakfast, driftwood workshop, bakery, and convenience store with storage facilities and U-Haul services. The latter occupies the site of the former elementary school, which closed around 1986.
