= Reward, Saskatchewan =

Community in Saskatchewan, Canada

Coordinates: 52°17′00″N 109°22′03″W

Location of Reward in Saskatchewan

Reward is a hamlet in the Canadian province of Saskatchewan within the Rural Municipality of Grass Lake No. 381. It is located 26 kilometres (16 mi) north of Luseland on Grid Road 675.

About 3 kilometres (1.9 mi) south of Reward on Grid 675 is the site of the Shrine of the Holy Rosary. The site has been the location of an annual pilgrimage since 1932. About 3,000 people participated in the first pilgrimage. Holy Rosary Church built from 1918 to 1920 features works by the artist Count Berthold von Imhoff.

The Roman Catholic church, shrine and cemetery of the Holy Rosary is a Municipal Heritage Property and was listed on the Canadian Register in 2006.

== See also ==
- List of communities in Saskatchewan
