= Springwater, Saskatchewan =

Community in Saskatchewan, Canada

Springwater is a special service area in the Rural Municipality of Biggar No. 347, Saskatchewan, Canada. It held village status prior to December 31, 2006. Springwater is located south of Lydden Lake, west of Springwater Lake and southeast of Sunny Lake. It is also the location of the Springwater Meteorite found in 1931 near Springwater.

== Demographics ==
In the 2021 Census of Population conducted by Statistics Canada, Springwater had a population of 10 living in 7 of its 8 total private dwellings, a change of 0% from its 2016 population of 10. With a land area of 0.67 km^{2} (0.26 sq mi), it had a population density of 14.9/km^{2} (38.7/sq mi) in 2021.

== See also ==
- List of communities in Saskatchewan
- List of hamlets in Saskatchewan
