= Kelfield, Saskatchewan =

Hamlet in Saskatchewan, Canada

Kelfield
- Hamlets
- Location within Saskatchewan Location within Canada
- Coordinates: 51°57′00″N 108°37′00″W
- Country: Canada
- Province: Saskatchewan
- Region: Saskatchewan
- Census division: 13
- Rural Municipality: Grandview
- Post office Founded: 1909-09-01
- Incorporated (Village): 1913
- Incorporated (Town): N/A
- Time zone: CST
- Area code: 306
- Highways: 51

Kelfield is a hamlet in central Saskatchewan, Canada. The hamlet is also the home of the municipal offices for the Rural Municipality of Grandview No. 349.

With the arrival of the Canadian Pacific Railway in 1912, this caused some movement of settlement in the area as local settler moved from the old settlement into the new town site, this also saw the establishment of the Kelfield Lumber Company in the town. Between 1915 and 1916 a second sawmill, the Western Canada Sawmill, opened, as well as a hotel, butcher shop and other business establishments. These early years corresponded to the boom period for the hamlet.

== See also ==
- List of communities in Saskatchewan
- List of hamlets in Saskatchewan
