= Cosine, Saskatchewan =

Coordinates: 52°08′25″N 109°55′55″W

Cosine is an unincorporated community in the Rural Municipality of Heart's Hill No. 352, Saskatchewan, Canada. It is located about 5 kilometres from the Alberta-Saskatchewan border on Saskatchewan Highway 680.

== History ==
Named after Cosine Lake, which is about 3 kilometres north. The name comes from when one of the surveyors in the area made an error in calculation during his work.

== See also ==
- St. Joseph's Colony
- List of communities in Saskatchewan
