= Denzil, Saskatchewan =

Village in Saskatchewan, Canada

Denzil
- Village
- Village of Denzil
- Location of Denzil in Saskatchewan Denzil (Canada)
- Coordinates: 52°13′43.5″N 109°39′0″W
- Country: Canada
- Province: Saskatchewan
- Region: West-Central
- Census division: 13
- Rural Municipality: Eye Hill No. 382
- Post office Founded: 1972

Government
  - Type: Municipal
  - Governing body: Denzil Village Council
  - Mayor: Larry Reiniger
  - Administrator: Kathy Reschny

Area
  - Total: 0.55 km^{2} (0.21 sq mi)

Population (2016)
  - Total: 143
  - Density: 261.7/km^{2} (678/sq mi)
- Time zone: UTC-6 (CST)
- Postal code: S0L 0S0
- Area code: 306
- Highways: Highway 31
- Railways: Canadian Pacific Railway

Denzil (2016 population: 143) is a village in the Canadian province of Saskatchewan within the Rural Municipality of Eye Hill No. 382 and Census Division No. 13.

== History ==
Denzil incorporated as a village on May 3, 1911.

== Demographics ==
Population history (1981–2016)
Year	Pop.	±%
1981	199	—
1986	247	+24.1%
1991	207	−16.2%
1996	194	−6.3%
2001	161	−17.0%
2006	142	−11.8%
2011	135	−4.9%
2016	143	+5.9%
Source: Statistics Canada via Saskatchewan Bureau of Statistics

In the 2021 Census of Population conducted by Statistics Canada, Denzil had a population of 140 living in 64 of its 71 total private dwellings, a change of −2.1% from its 2016 population of 143. With a land area of 0.61 km^{2} (0.24 sq mi), it had a population density of 229.5/km^{2} (594.4/sq mi) in 2021.

In the 2016 Census of Population, the Village of Denzil recorded a population of 143 living in 61 of its 73 total private dwellings, a 5.6% change from its 2011 population of 135. With a land area of 0.55 km^{2} (0.21 sq mi), it had a population density of 260.0/km^{2} (673.4/sq mi) in 2016.

== See also ==
- List of communities in Saskatchewan
- List of villages in Saskatchewan
