= Marengo, Saskatchewan =

Village in Saskatchewan, Canada

Coordinates: 51°28′47″N 109°47′01″W

Location of Marengo in Saskatchewan

Marengo (2016 population: 67) is a village in the Canadian province of Saskatchewan within the Rural Municipality of Milton No. 292 and Census Division No. 13. It is about 45 kilometres (28 mi) west of Kindersley along Highway 7. It is located within the Sun West School Division.

== History ==
Marengo incorporated as a village on November 5, 1910. The village originally incorporated under the name of Melbourne, which was probably a preliminary name given by the Canadian Northern Railway. However, the post office was given the name Marengo in 1911, named after Marengo, Illinois, the hometown of pioneer J. Ray Goodrich. Later in 1911, its name was changed to Fuller after a manager of a ranch, because the post office would not allow "Melbourne". After three years, it changed back to Marengo.

On October 8, 2020, a grain elevator caught on fire in Marengo; the village was temporarily evacuated and no one was injured.

== Demographics ==
Population history (1981–2016)
Year	Pop.	±%
1981	79	—
1986	97	+22.8%
1991	69	−28.9%
1996	61	−11.6%
2001	47	−23.0%
2006	51	+8.5%
2011	47	−7.8%
2016	67	+42.6%
Source: Statistics Canada via Saskatchewan Bureau of Statistics

In the 2021 Census of Population conducted by Statistics Canada, Marengo had a population of 75 living in 30 of its 39 total private dwellings, a change of 11.9% from its 2016 population of 67. With a land area of 0.89 km^{2} (0.34 sq mi), it had a population density of 84.3/km^{2} (218.3/sq mi) in 2021.

In the 2016 Census of Population, the Village of Marengo recorded a population of 67 living in 29 of its 36 total private dwellings, a 29.9% change from its 2011 population of 47. With a land area of 0.87 km^{2} (0.34 sq mi), it had a population density of 77.0/km^{2} (199.5/sq mi) in 2016.

== See also ==
- List of villages in Saskatchewan
