= Evesham, Saskatchewan =

Community in Saskatchewan, Canada

Coordinates: 52°23′28″N 109°50′43″W

Evesham is a hamlet in the Rural Municipality of Eye Hill No. 382, Saskatchewan, Canada. In 2001, the community had a population of 40 people and today fosters 35 citizens. It previously held the status of village until August 3, 2000. The hamlet is located 31 kilometres (19 mi) east of the town of Provost, Alberta, on Highway 14.

== History ==
Prior to August 3, 2000, Evesham was incorporated as a village; it was restructured as a hamlet under the jurisdiction of the Rural Municipality of Eye Hill on that date.

== See also ==
- List of communities in Saskatchewan
- List of hamlets in Saskatchewan
