= Handel, Saskatchewan =

Handel
- special service area
- Location of Handel in Saskatchewan Handel (Canada)
- Coordinates: 52.062°N 108.693°W
- Country: Canada
- Province: Saskatchewan
- Region: Saskatchewan
- Census division: 13
- Rural Municipality: Grandview
- Restructured (Hamlet): January 31, 2007

Government
  - Governing body: Grandview No. 349
  - Reeve: Sally Germsheid
  - Administrator: Patti J. Turk

Area
  - Total: 2.66 km^{2} (1.03 sq mi)

Population (2006)
  - Total: 25
  - Density: 9.4/km^{2} (24/sq mi)
  - Dwellings: 7
- Time zone: CST
- Postal code: S0G 0L0
- Area code: 306
- Highways: Highway 657
- Waterways: Tramping Lake

Handel is a special service area in Grandview No. 349, Saskatchewan, Canada. The population was 25 at the time of the 2006 Census. The community is located approximately 45 km directly west of the town of Biggar on Highway 51.

== History ==
Prior to January 31, 2007, Handel was a village, but it was restructured as a hamlet on that date.

== Demographics ==
In the 2021 Canadian census, Handel had a population of 20 living in 9 of its 11 total private dwellings, a change of 0% from its 2016 population of 20. With a land area of 2.73 km^{2} (1.05 sq mi), it had a population density of 7.3/km^{2} (19.0/sq mi) in 2021.

== See also ==
- List of communities in Saskatchewan
- List of villages in Saskatchewan
