= Major, Saskatchewan =

Village in Saskatchewan, Canada

Village of Major
- Village
- Location of Major in Saskatchewan Village of Major (Canada)
- Coordinates: 51.873°N 109.613°W
- Country: Canada
- Province: Saskatchewan
- Region: Saskatchewan
- Census division: 13
- Rural Municipality: Prairiedale Website - www.major.ca
- Post office Founded: N/A
- Incorporated (Village): N/A
- Incorporated (Town): N/A

Government
  - Mayor: Veryl Richelhoff
  - Administrator: Kelly Cooper
  - Governing body: Major Village Council

Area
  - Total: 2.68 km^{2} (1.03 sq mi)

Population (2006)
  - Total: 67
  - Density: 30.2/km^{2} (78/sq mi)
- Time zone: CST
- Postal code: S0L 2H0
- Area code: 306
- Highways: Highway 51

Major (2016 population: 35) is a village in the Canadian province of Saskatchewan within the Rural Municipality of Prairiedale No. 321 and Census Division No. 13.

== History ==
Major incorporated as a village on September 29, 1914.

== Demographics ==
Population history (1981–2016)
| Year | Pop. | ±% |
|---|---|---|
| 1981 | 119 | — |
| 1986 | 120 | +0.8% |
| 1991 | 64 | −46.7% |
| 1996 | 72 | +12.5% |
| 2001 | 81 | +12.5% |
| 2006 | 67 | −17.3% |
| 2011 | 61 | −9.0% |
| 2016 | 35 | −42.6% |
Source: Statistics Canada via Saskatchewan Bureau of Statistics

In the 2021 Census of Population conducted by Statistics Canada, Major had a population of 35 living in 21 of its 24 total private dwellings, a change of 0% from its 2016 population of 35. With a land area of 2.6 square kilometres (1.0 sq mi), it had a population density of 13.5/km^{2} (34.9/sq mi) in 2021.

In the 2016 Census of Population, the Village of Major recorded a population of 35 living in 17 of its 26 total private dwellings, a −74.3% change from its 2011 population of 61. With a land area of 2.78 km^{2} (1.07 sq mi), it had a population density of 12.6/km^{2} (32.6/sq mi) in 2016.

== Notable people ==
- Laurie Boschman, former NHL forward

== See also ==
- List of communities in Saskatchewan
- List of villages in Saskatchewan
