= Broadacres, Saskatchewan =

Community in Saskatchewan, Canada

Coordinates: 52°02′39″N 108°58′43″W

Location of Broadacres in Saskatchewan

Broadacres is an unincorporated community in the Rural Municipality of Mariposa No. 350, Saskatchewan, Canada.

== See also ==
- List of communities in Saskatchewan
- List of hamlets in Saskatchewan
