= Kerrobert =

Town in Saskatchewan, Canada

- Town
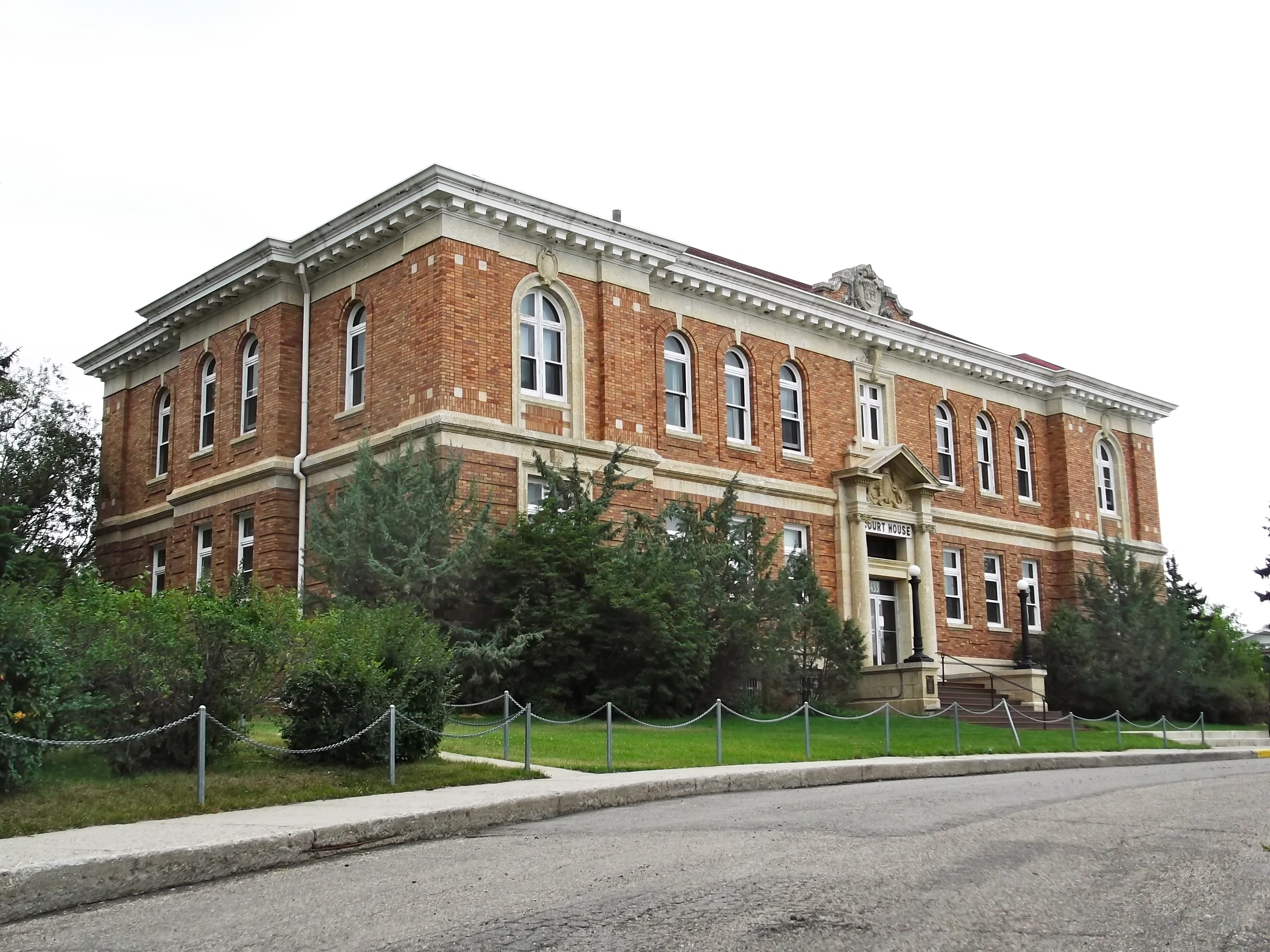
- Kerrobert Court House

- Location of Kerrobert in Canada
- Coordinates: 51°55′12″N 109°07′38″W
- Country: Canada
- Province: Saskatchewan
- Post Office established: 1910
- Town: 1911

Government
  - Mayor: Michael Mitchell
  - MLA Kindersley: Kim Gartner (Canadian politician)
  - MP Battlefords—Lloydminster: Rosemarie Falk

Area
  - Total: 7.49 km^{2} (2.89 sq mi)

Population (2021)
  - Total: 970
  - Density: 114.5/km^{2} (297/sq mi)
- Time zone: UTC−6 (Central Standard Time)
  - Summer (DST): UTC−5
- Postal code: S0L 1R0
- Highways: Highway 21 / Highway 31 / Highway 51
- Website: Town of Kerrobert website

Kerrobert is a town in west central Saskatchewan. It has a population of 970 (2021).

Kerrobert is served by Highway 21, Highway 31, and Highway 51 as well as the Canadian Pacific Railway. It is approximately 65 kilometres (40 mi) east of the Saskatchewan/Alberta border and 180 kilometres (110 mi) west of Saskatoon.

The town is known for its large water tower, clearly visible from 15 kilometres (10 mi) away.

== History ==
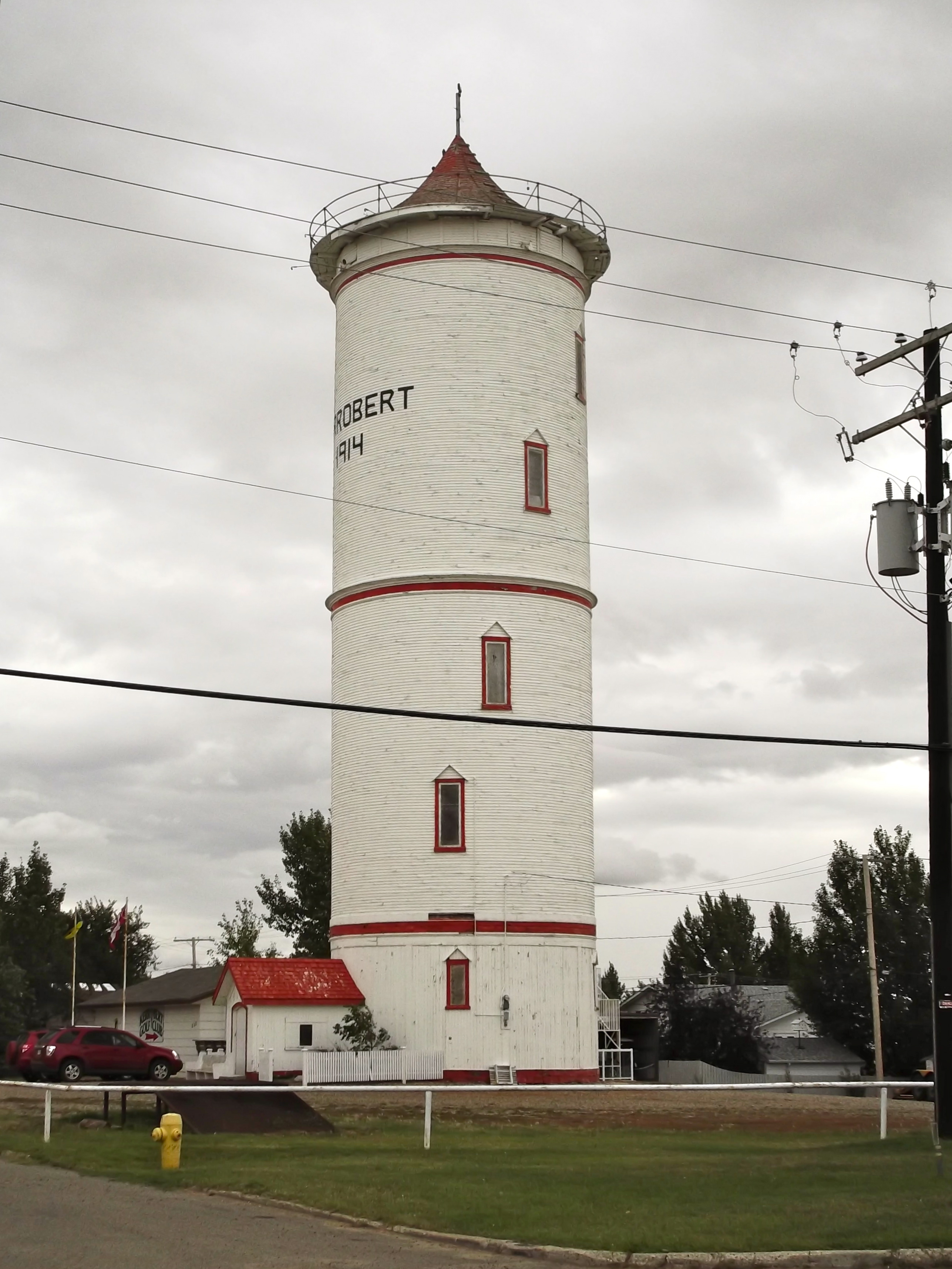
Kerrobert Water Tower

The village began with the name of Hartsberg in 1906, which became Kerr-Robert in 1910, with a final name change in 1924 to Kerrobert.

Historic sites

Kerrobert is home to several historic buildings including the Kerrobert Water Tower (1914), the Kerrobert Library (1910) and the Kerrobert Court House

Kerrobert Court House, located in the centre of the town, was built in 1920. It was designed by the Provincial Architect Maurice W. Sharon and built by Wilson and Wilson of Regina for $145,750. The brick and stone structure was the seat of the Kerrobert Judicial District. The former courthouse is currently used as the Town of Kerrobert Municipal office.

Kerrobert Rink

Kerrobert's first rink was built in 1910. A tin covered structure was built in 1911 on the 400 block of Manitoba Ave. The arena was used by citizens of the Kerrobert area until it was destroyed in a tornado in 1919. Metal was sent flying for miles and one man was killed by the flying tin. The insurance of the rink had expired a few days before. Residents went back to skating on the slaughterhouse slough. In 1927 there was a shell built to enclose the rink. On the morning of Nov. 25, 1946 the "old blue rink" was found to be burning. Subsequently, the provincial cabinet decided that Kerrobert would purchase and relocate one of the RCAF hangars located in North Battleford. Construction began on the new rink in August 1947 and was finished November 11. The rink was opened Christmas Day for the first time for public skating and curling.

== Demographics ==
In the 2021 Census of Population conducted by Statistics Canada, Kerrobert had a population of 970 living in 410 of its 494 total private dwellings, a change of −5.5% from its 2016 population of 1,026. With a land area of 8.47 km^{2} (3.27 sq mi), it had a population density of 114.5/km^{2} (296.6/sq mi) in 2021.

Canada census – Kerrobert community profile

	2021	2016	2011
Population	970 (-5.5% from 2016)	1,026 (-3.3% from 2011)	1,061 (+6.0% from 2006)
Land area	8.47 km^{2} (3.27 sq mi)	8.52 km^{2} (3.29 sq mi)	7.49 km^{2} (2.89 sq mi)
Population density	114.5/km^{2} (297/sq mi)	120.4/km^{2} (312/sq mi)	141.7/km^{2} (367/sq mi)
Median age	42.8 (M: 40.4, F: 45.2)	41.8 (M: 40.0, F: 43.8)	42.2 (M: 39.5, F: 45.2)
Private dwellings	494 (total) 410 (occupied)	497 (total)	480 (total)
Median household income	$82,000

References: 2021 2016 2011

== Climate ==
Kerrobert experiences a dry semi-arid climate. Winters are long, dry and very cold, while summers are short and warm. Precipitation is low, with an annual average of 342mm (13.5 in), and is heavily concentrated in the warmer months.

Climate data for Kerrobert
Month	Jan	Feb	Mar	Apr	May	Jun	Jul	Aug	Sep	Oct	Nov	Dec	Year
Record high °C (°F)	8 (46)	8 (46)	18.5 (65.3)	31 (88)	36 (97)	40.5 (104.9)	40.5 (104.9)	38 (100)	36.7 (98.1)	29.5 (85.1)	21.1 (70.0)	11 (52)	40.5 (104.9)
Mean daily maximum °C (°F)	−10.3 (13.5)	−7 (19)	0.6 (33.1)	11.4 (52.5)	18.8 (65.8)	22.9 (73.2)	25.5 (77.9)	24.7 (76.5)	18.9 (66.0)	11.4 (52.5)	−0.8 (30.6)	−8.5 (16.7)	9 (48)
Daily mean °C (°F)	−15.7 (3.7)	−12.6 (9.3)	−5 (23)	4.2 (39.6)	11 (52)	15.4 (59.7)	17.8 (64.0)	16.7 (62.1)	11.1 (52.0)	4.3 (39.7)	−6.2 (20.8)	−13.7 (7.3)	2.3 (36.1)
Mean daily minimum °C (°F)	−20.6 (−5.1)	−17.8 (0.0)	−10.5 (13.1)	−2.9 (26.8)	3.2 (37.8)	7.8 (46.0)	10 (50)	8.6 (47.5)	3.3 (37.9)	−2.8 (27.0)	−11.5 (11.3)	−18.8 (−1.8)	−4.4 (24.1)
Record low °C (°F)	−43.5 (−46.3)	−45 (−49)	−37 (−35)	−24 (−11)	−9 (16)	−4.5 (23.9)	1.5 (34.7)	−2.5 (27.5)	−11.5 (11.3)	−27 (−17)	−35.5 (−31.9)	−44.5 (−48.1)	−45 (−49)
Average precipitation mm (inches)	12 (0.5)	8.9 (0.35)	13.4 (0.53)	24.1 (0.95)	35.8 (1.41)	65.5 (2.58)	66.9 (2.63)	47.5 (1.87)	26.5 (1.04)	13.8 (0.54)	12.8 (0.50)	14.4 (0.57)	341.7 (13.45)
Source: Environment Canada

== Economy ==
The SaskPower Ermine Power Station is located in Kerrobert, with construction planned to be completed in 2010.

== Sports ==
Every year in March the town of Kerrobert plays host to the Kerrobert Ice Dog Rec Tournament, an ice hockey tournament.

Kerrobert is home to the Kerrobert Tigers of the Sask West Hockey League (SWHL).

== Education ==
The Kerrobert High School was built in 1959. It had a gymnasium, a library, science lab, and a home economics room. The school was known around the area for its football field and the track around it.

In 1968 the Kerrobert High School was renamed the James Charteris Composite High School. James Charteris had worked at the Kerrobert School Unit Board for 22 years. The JCCS (James Charteris Composite School) schooled grade 7-12 until 1989, when Mary Rodney School closed down and grades K-6 were incorporated into JCCS. At this time, the school was again renamed, becoming Kerrobert Composite School or KCS.

At one time, the school's Curling Club included 20 students. In 2003, the team won both the provincial title and the gold medal in the Canada Winter Games. In 2005, the team won the Provincial Senior Boys Curling Championship as well.

== See also ==
- List of towns in Saskatchewan
