= Primate, Saskatchewan =

Community in Saskatchewan, Canada

Primate
- Special service area
- Location within Saskatchewan Location within Canada
- Coordinates: 52.153509°N 109.485055°W
- Country: Canada
- Province: Saskatchewan
- Census division: 13
- Rural municipality: Eye Hill No. 382
- Incorporated (village): April 5, 1922
- Dissolved (special service area): December 31, 2015

Area (2016)
  - Land: 0.94 km^{2} (0.36 sq mi)

Population (2016)
  - Total: 52
  - Density: 55.2/km^{2} (143/sq mi)
- Time zone: UTC-6 (CST)
- Area code: 306

Primate is a special service area within the Rural Municipality of Eye Hill No. 382, Saskatchewan, Canada that held village status prior to 2016.

== History ==
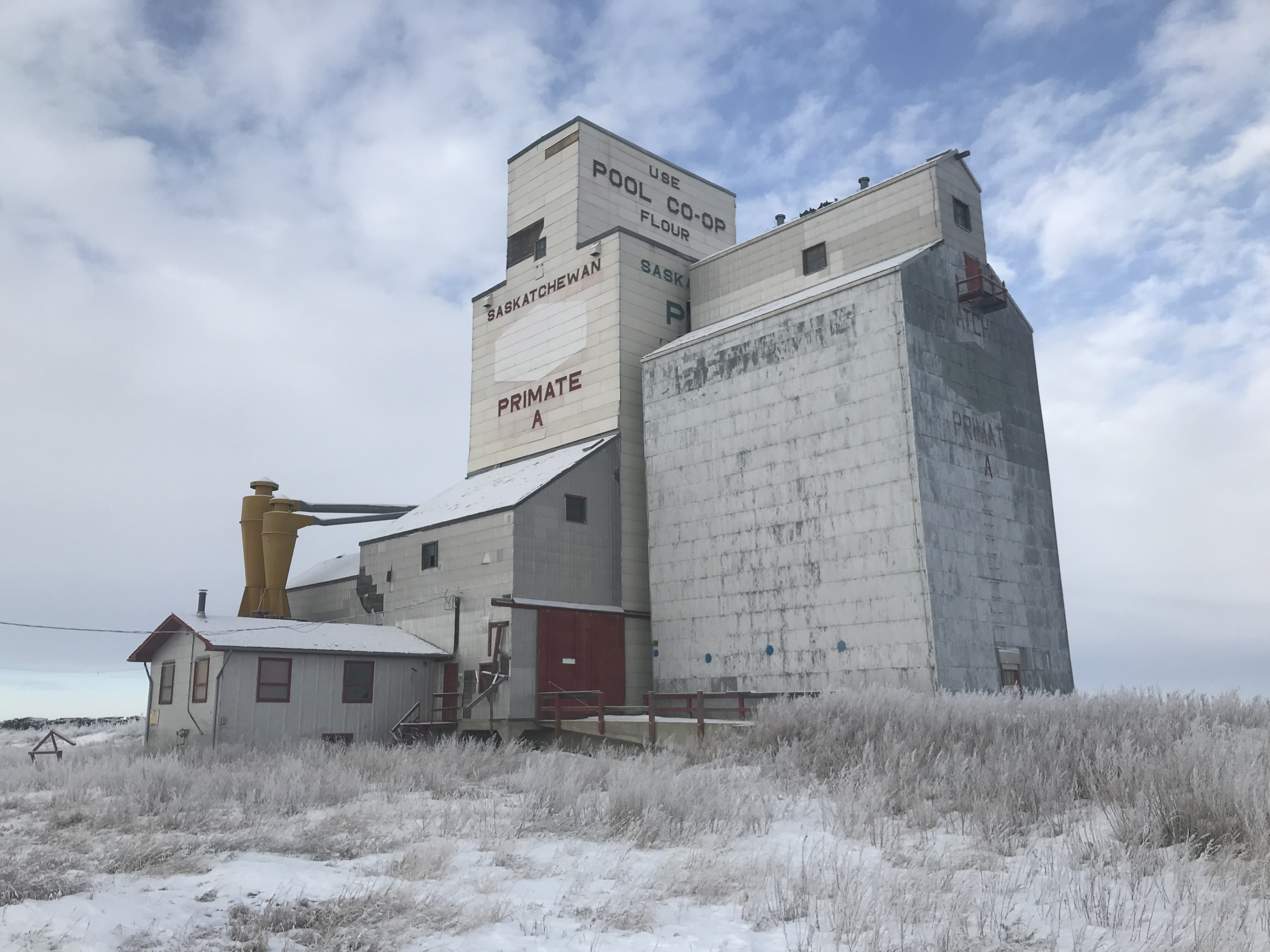
Abandoned elevator at Primate

Primate incorporated as a village on April 5, 1922. It restructured on December 31, 2015, relinquishing its village status in favour of becoming a special service area under the jurisdiction of the Rural Municipality of Eye Hill No. 382.

== Demographics ==
In the 2021 Census of Population conducted by Statistics Canada, Primate had a population of 35 living in 17 of its 19 total private dwellings, a change of −32.7% from its 2016 population of 52. With a land area of 0.86 km^{2} (0.33 sq mi), it had a population density of 40.7/km^{2} (105.4/sq mi) in 2021.

In the 2016 Census of Population conducted by Statistics Canada, Primate recorded a population of 52 living in 21 of its 24 total private dwellings, a 15.6% change from its 2011 population of 45. With a land area of 0.94 km^{2} (0.36 sq mi), it had a population density of 55.3/km^{2} (143.3/sq mi) in 2016.

== See also ==
- List of communities in Saskatchewan
- List of special service areas in Saskatchewan
