= Macklin, Saskatchewan =

Town in Saskatchewan, Canada

Macklin
- Town
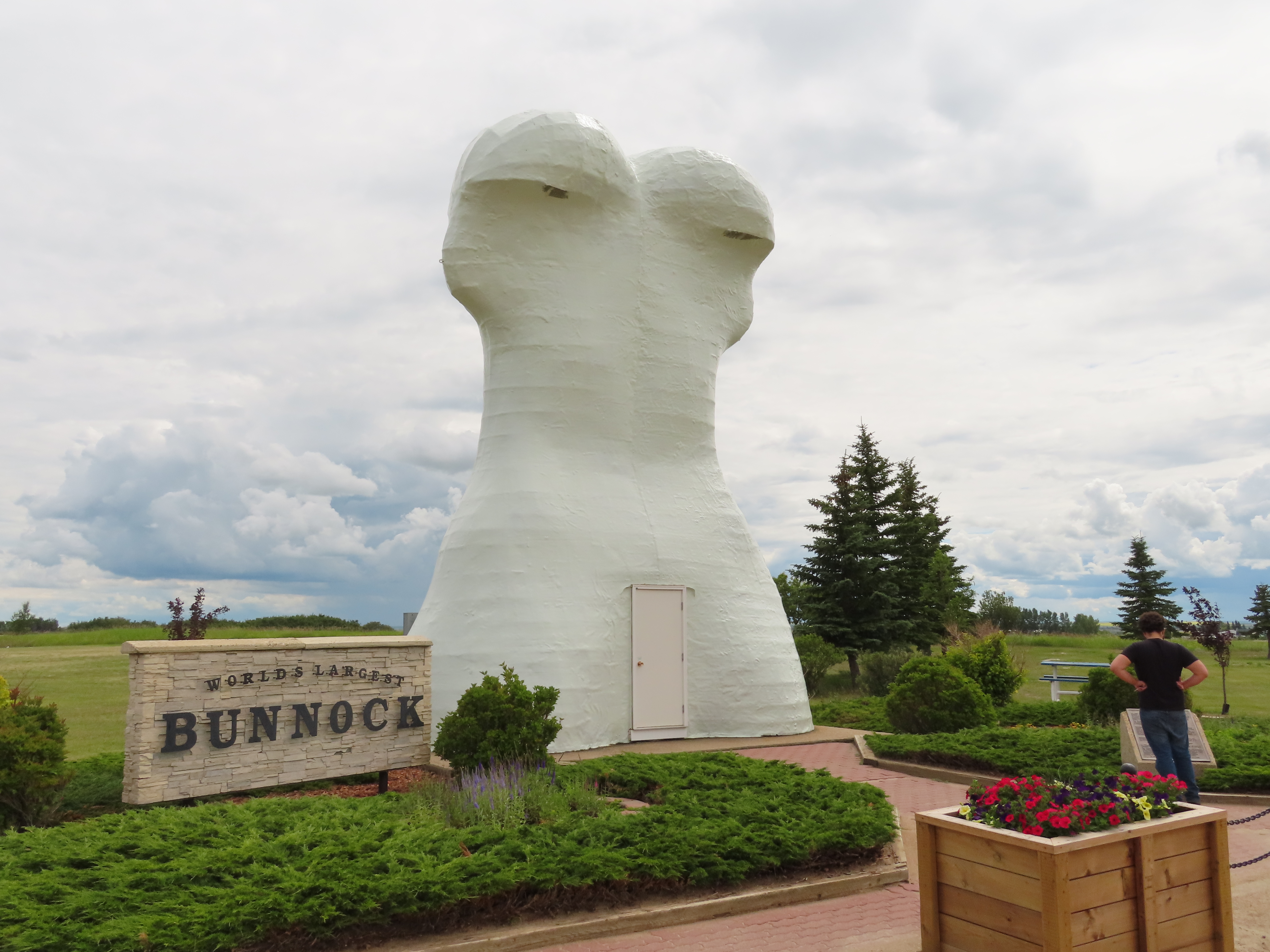
- World's Largest Bunnock statue

- Location within Saskatchewan
- Coordinates: 52.33°N 109.94°W
- Country: Canada
- Province: Saskatchewan
- Census division: 13
- Rural Municipality: Eye Hill
- Post office established: 1908

Government
  - Mayor: Brad Bogen
  - Administrator: Kim G. Gartner
  - Governing body: Macklin Town Council

Area
  - Total: 3.05 km^{2} (1.18 sq mi)

Population (2021)
  - Total: 1,247
  - Density: 498/km^{2} (1,290/sq mi)
- Time zone: CST
- Postal code: S0L 2C0
- Area code: 306
- Highways: Highway 14; Highway 17; Highway 31
- Waterways: Eyehill Creek; St. Lawrence Lake; Macklin Lake; Hallam Lake
- Website: Town of Macklin

Macklin is a town in the Rural Municipality of Eye Hill No. 382, Saskatchewan, Canada. The population was 1,247 at the 2021 Canadian census. The town is located on Highway 14 and Highway 31 about 5 kilometres (3.1 mi) east of the provincial border with Alberta, and is situated near one of the most productive oil and natural gas producing fields in the province.

Among its many attractions, it is the host of the annual Bunnock World Championship, during which the town population doubles in size.

== Demographics ==
In the 2021 Census of Population conducted by Statistics Canada, Macklin had a population of 1,247 living in 498 of its 551 total private dwellings, a change of −9.2% from its 2016 population of 1,374. With a land area of 3.05 km^{2} (1.18 sq mi), it had a population density of 408.9/km^{2} (1,058.9/sq mi) in 2021.

Canada census – Macklin community profile

	2021	2016	2011
Population	1,247 (-9.2% from 2016)	1,374 (-2.9% from 2011)	1,415 (+9.7% from 2006)
Land area	3.05 km^{2} (1.18 sq mi)	3.14 km^{2} (1.21 sq mi)	3.14 km^{2} (1.21 sq mi)
Population density	409.2/km^{2} (1,060/sq mi)	437.6/km^{2} (1,133/sq mi)	450.7/km^{2} (1,167/sq mi)
Median age	38.0 (M: 34.8, F: 40.0)	35.4 (M: 34.1, F: 36.9)	31.9 (M: 31.3, F: 33.1)
Private dwellings	551 (total) 498 (occupied)	563 (total)	559 (total)
Median household income	$88,000

References: 2021 2016 2011

== Macklin Lake Regional Park ==
Macklin Lake Regional Park (52.3253°N 109.9362°W) is located 1 kilometre (0.62 mi) south of town along the shore of Macklin Lake with access from Highway 31. It was founded in 1962 on land that was donated by the RM of Eye Hill. The regional park has a campground with 164 campsites, a beach, golf course, ball diamonds, trout pond stocked with rainbow trout, hiking trails, and a playground.

Macklin Lakeview Golf Club is a grass greens, 9-hole course that opened in 1990. It is a par 36 with 3,067 total yards. The clubhouse has a licensed lounge and rentals are available.

== Notable people ==
- Jeremy Hunt, cyclist
- Agnes Martin, painter
- Cole Reschny, hockey player

== See also ==
- List of communities in Saskatchewan
- List of towns in Saskatchewan
