= Saskatchewan Highway 7 =

Provincial highway in Saskatchewan, Canada

Highway 7
- Highway 7 highlighted in red
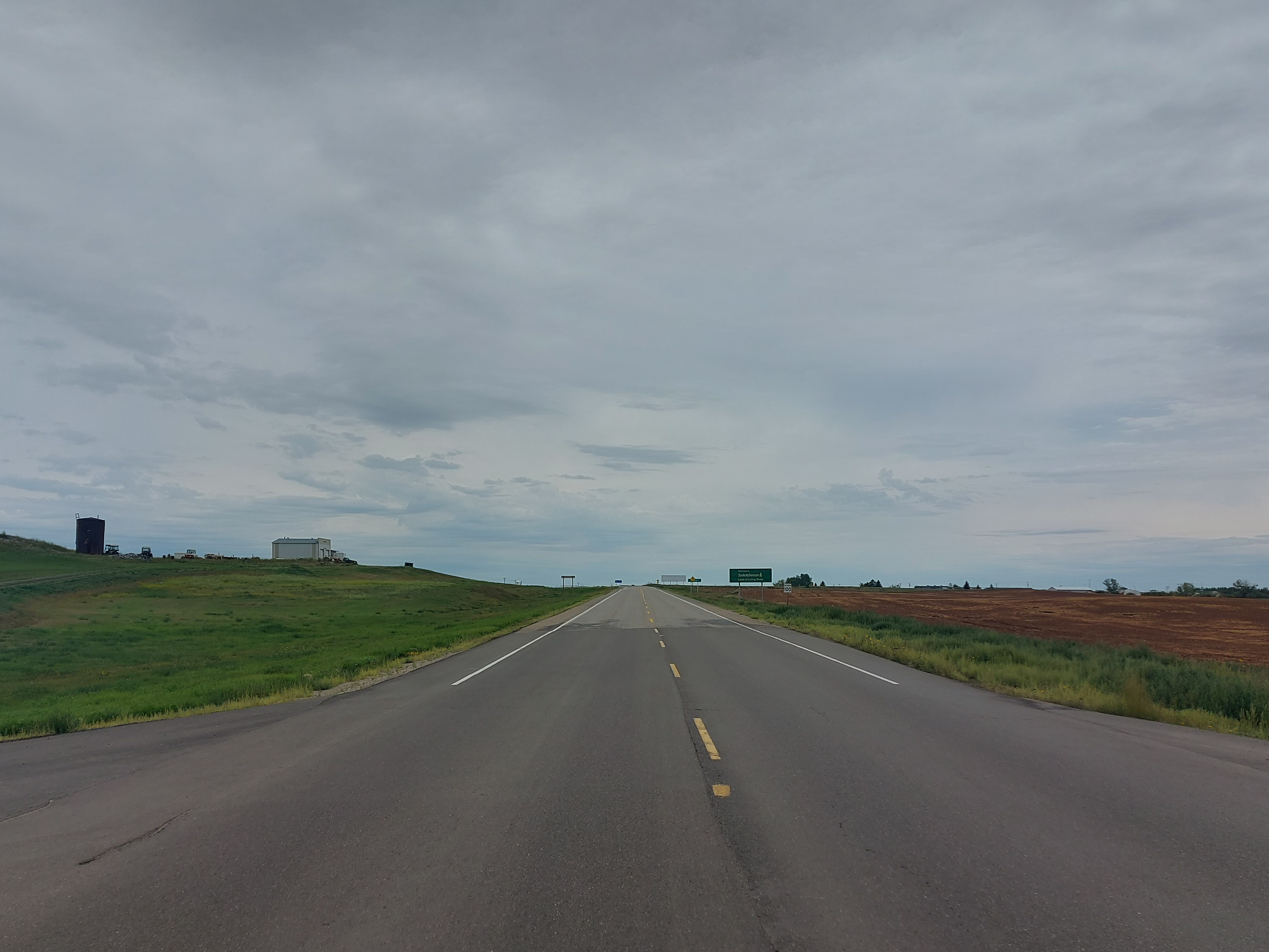
- The western terminus of Highway 7, facing east

Route information
- Maintained by Ministry of Highways and Infrastructure & Transport Canada
- Length: 260.7 km (162.0 mi)

Major junctions
- West end: Highway 9 at the Alberta border near Alsask
- Highway 44 at Alsask; Highway 21 at Kindersley; Highway 30 near Brock; Highway 4 at Rosetown; Highway 45 at Delisle; Highway 60 near Saskatoon; Highway 14 in Saskatoon
- East end: Highway 11 in Saskatoon

Location
- Country: Canada
- Province: Saskatchewan
- Rural municipalities: Milton No. 292, Kindersley No. 290, Pleasant Valley No. 288, St. Andrews No. 287, Marriott No. 317, Harris No. 316, Vanscoy No. 345, Corman Park No. 344
- Major cities: Saskatoon
- Towns: Kindersley, Rosetown

Highway system
- Provincial highways in Saskatchewan
← Highway 6	→ Highway 8

Saskatchewan Highway 7 is a major paved provincial highway in Saskatchewan, Canada, running from the border with Alberta east to the city of Saskatoon. It continues west into Alberta as Alberta Highway 9. Highway 7 is an important trade and travel route linking Saskatoon with several of its bedroom communities, such as Delisle and Vanscoy, as well as larger centres farther west, such as Rosetown and Kindersley. Its primary use, however, is by travellers heading for Calgary, Alberta, and the Canadian West Coast. Extensive oil exploration and development has been occurring in the region since 2010, primarily around Kindersley, from Brock to the Alberta border. Heavy traffic, agriculture, grain transport, and oilfield service, as well as oil and fuel transports, are common on this highway.

The highway is about 254 kilometres (158 mi) long. Most of it is two-lanes with less than 40 kilometres (25 mi) being four-laned. In addition to the twinned sections, there are over 25 passing lanes along the highway to ease the flow of traffic. Many of those passing lanes were constructed post-2014 to improve highway safety and flow as traffic during the 2010s had increased by 20 per cent.

== History ==
The current routing of Highway 7 between Saskatoon and Rosetown was originally part of the Red River Trails and was named the "Old Bone Trail". It was named as such because of the "buffalo bones found near the trail".

In the 1930s early homesteaders would maintain Provincial Highway 7 as a means to supplement their income. Provincial Highway 7 followed the Canadian Northern Railway grade for direction of travel with the actual road way being on the square on the Dominion survey township lines. Highway 7 was widened in 1944 and rebuilt between 1960 and 1961.

In 2005, work began on re-aligning Highway 7 in order to make way for the Blairmore Suburban Centre development including the Bethlehem High School, Tommy Douglas Collegiate, and the Shaw Centre located where Highway 7 linked with 22nd Street prior to 2006.

In the fall of 2019, 31 kilometres (19 mi) of twinning was completed between Delisle and Saskatoon. This included a 12-kilometre (7.5 mi) long bypass of Vanscoy.

== Route description ==
Highway 7 is a major east–west highway in central Saskatchewan that runs from Saskatchewan's border with Alberta at Alsask east to the city of Saskatoon. The entirety of the highway is a primary weight asphalt concrete (AS) national highway within the Ministry of Highways and Infrastructure (SHS) West Central Municipal Government Committee planning jurisdiction. Travelling west into Alberta, it continues as Alberta's Highway 9. Its eastern terminus is at Highway 14 on the west side of Saskatoon in the Blairmore Sector. About 36.5 kilometres (22.7 mi) of the highway's 254 kilometres (158 mi) is four-laned. Outside of the four-laned sections, there are 26 passing lanes that were constructed to help improve traffic flow and safety. "Passing lanes can reduce collisions by 25 per cent at 80 per cent less cost than that of twinning."

At Highway 7's western terminus, the community of Alsask is on the south side of the highway and Alsask Radar Dome is on the northside. About 1.6 kilometres (1 mi) east of the Alberta border, Highway 44's northern terminus meets Highway 7. Highway 44 heads south and provides access to Alsask. From the intersection with 44, Highway 7 travels north-east past Merid en route to Highway 317 and Marengo. It then follows a more easterly direction towards the intersection with Highway 21 and the town of Kindersley. Between Marengo and Kindersley, the highway provides access to a pull-out for a buffalo rubbing stone, passes through Flaxcombe, intersects Highway 307, and crosses Teo Lakes. Kindersley Regional Park is within the town's city limits about 1.6 kilometres (1 mi) south of Highway 7. Continuing east from Kindersley, Highway 7 provides access to the communities of Beadle, Netherhill, and D'Arcy. Between Beadle and Netherhill, Highways 7 and 658 share an 8.1-kilometre (5.0 mi) long concurrency. The highway also meets the southern terminus of Highway 657 and the northern terminus of Highway 30 about 3.2 kilometres (2.0 mi) north of Brock.

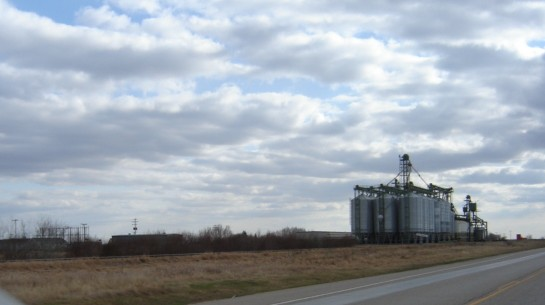
Feedlot near Delisle

At D'Arcy, Highway 7 begins to make a gradual turn to the north-northeast providing access to Fiske and McGee as it progresses towards Highway 4 and Rosetown. At Fiske, it meets the southern terminus of Highway 656. Continuing from Rosetown, Highway 7 turns to the north-east where it becomes four lanes for the 2 kilometres (1.2 mi) past the Rosetown Airport. After it returns to being two lanes, it continues travelling north-east where it provides access to the communities of Zealandia, Crystal Beach, Harris, Tessier, Laura, and Delisle. Highways that intersect 7 along this segment include 664, 768, 655, and 45. The remainder of the highway's 34.5 kilometres (21.4 mi) from Delisle to Saskatoon is four lanes.

The four-lane section of Highway 7 begins about a half a kilometre past Highway 45 as it enters Delisle. As the highway leaves Delisle, it intersects Highway 766 and continues to the north-east towards Vanscoy. About halfway between Delisle and Vanscoy, Highway 7 intersects Agrium Road which leads to the north and Nutrien Vanscoy Potash mine. As Highway 7 approaches Vanscoy, it bypasses the village to the north. Highway 672 intersects 7 and provides access to Vanscoy. Highway 7 continues north-east from Vanscoy towards Saskatoon providing access to the Nutrien Cory Potash mine, George Genereux Urban Regional Park, City of Saskatoon Compost Depot, South West Development Area, and the Blairmore Sector. It also intersects Highway 60, traverses a bridge over the CN Railway, and has a level crossing with the CP Railway. As the highway crosses the tracks, it turns north for a short distance to meet Highway 14 at its eastern terminus. Long-term plans call for an interchange to be constructed here. While Highway 7 ends there, the roadway continues north as Highway 684 to intersect with Highway 16, the Yellowhead Highway, north-west of Saskatoon.

== Major intersections ==
From west to east:

Rural municipality	Location	km	mi	Destinations	Notes
Milton No. 292		0.0	0.0	Highway 9 west – Calgary	Continuation into Alberta
Milton No. 292	Alsask	1.2	0.75	Highway 44 south – Eatonia	
Milton No. 292		16.6	10.3	Highway 317 north – Marengo, Fusilier	
Kindersley No. 290	Flaxcombe	29.0	18.0		
Kindersley No. 290		39.9	24.8	Highway 307 north – Smiley	
Kindersley		61.0	37.9	Highway 21 – Kerrobert, Eatonia	
Kindersley No. 290		74.1	46.0	Highway 658 north – Dodsland	West end of Highway 658 concurrency
Kindersley No. 290	Netherhill	82.2	51.1	Highway 658 south – Snipe Lake	East end of Highway 658 concurrency
Kindersley No. 290		92.0	57.2	Highway 30 south – Brock, Eston Highway 657 north – Plenty	Prairie West Terminal Road
Pleasant Valley No. 288	Fiske	114.9	71.4	Highway 656 north – Herschel	
St. Andrews No. 287	No major junctions				
Rosetown		144.2	89.6	Highway 4 to Highway 15 – Biggar, Swift Current	Four-way stop controlled intersection
St. Andrews No. 287	Zealandia	163.7	101.7	Highway 664 south – Sovereign	
Harris No. 316	Harris	180.5	112.2	Highway 768 north	
Harris No. 316		189.5	117.7	Highway 655 – Perdue, Milden	
Vanscoy No. 345	Delisle	217.6	135.2	Highway 45 south – Outlook	
Vanscoy No. 345	Delisle	220.3	136.9	Traynor Road to Highway 673 north / Highway 766 east – Asquith, Pike Lake	
Vanscoy No. 345	Vanscoy	233.3	145.0	Highway 672 – Grandora, Vanscoy	To Highway 762 east
Corman Park No. 344		248.9	154.7	Highway 60 south – Pike Lake Provincial Park	
City of Saskatoon		254.3	158.0	22nd Street W (Highway 14 west) – Biggar Neault Road (Highway 684 north) – Dalmeny	West end of Highway 14 concurrency; follows 22nd Street W
City of Saskatoon		257.3	159.9	Circle Drive to Highway 11 / Highway 16 – Airport	Interchange
City of Saskatoon		260.7	162.0	Idylwyld Drive (Highway 11) to Highway 16 / Highway 5 – Prince Albert, Regina, Battlefords, Yorkton 22nd Street E – City Centre	Highway 7 / Highway 14 eastern terminus; 22nd Street continues east
1.000 mi = 1.609 km; 1.000 km = 0.621 mi: Concurrency terminus; Route transition

== See also ==
- Roads in Saskatchewan
- Transportation in Saskatchewan
