= Saskatchewan Highway 307 =

Provincial highway in Saskatchewan, Canada

Highway 307

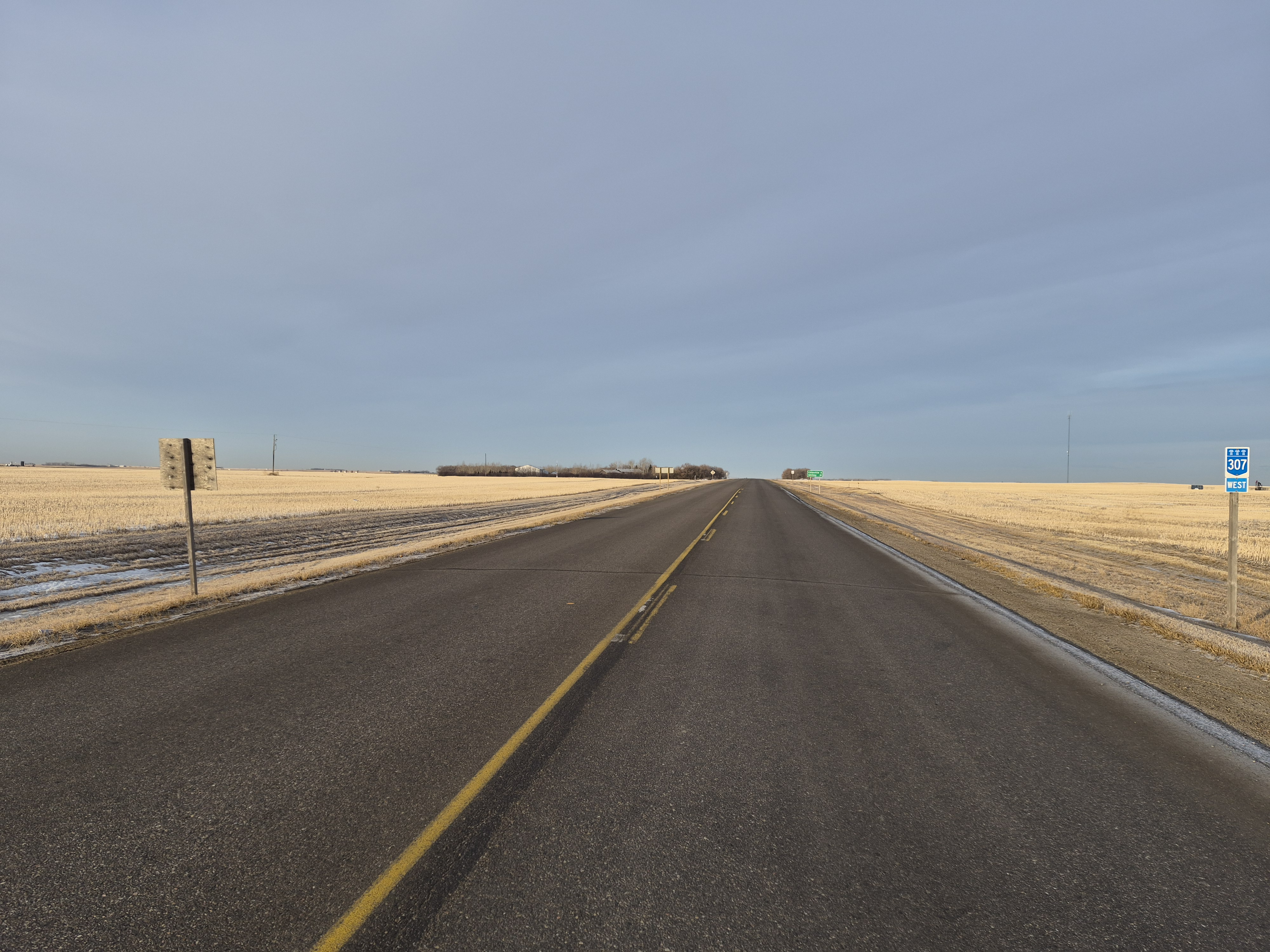
- Highway 307's eastern terminus

Route information
- Maintained by Ministry of Highways and Infrastructure
- Length: 47 km (29 mi)

Major junctions
- South end: Highway 7 near Flaxcombe
- East end: Highway 21 near Coleville

Location
- Country: Canada
- Province: Saskatchewan
- Rural municipalities: Kindersley, Prairiedale, Oakdale

Highway system
- Provincial highways in Saskatchewan
← Highway 306	→ Highway 308

Highway 307 is a provincial highway in Saskatchewan, Canada. It runs from Highway 7 to Highway 21. The highway intersects Highways 772 and 675, where it changes cardinal directions from north-south to east-west, and passes through the communities of Smiley and Coleville. It is about 47 kilometres (29 mi) long.

== Route description ==
Highway 307 begins just a few kilometres east of the village of Flaxcombe at an intersection with Highway 7 within the Rural Municipality of Kindersley No. 290. It heads north through rural prairie lands for several kilometres to enter the Rural Municipality of Prairiedale No. 321, travelling along the western edge of the village of Smiley to have a junction with Highway 772. Continuing on through rural areas, the highway eventually reaches a junction with Highway 675, where it makes a sudden sharp right and changes cardinal directions from north–south to east–west. Crossing into the Rural Municipality of Oakdale No. 320, Highway 307 heads due east to pass through the south side of the village of Coleville before coming to an end at an intersection with Highway 21, within the road continuing east as Township Road 320. The entire length of Highway 307 is a paved, two-lane highway. The highway does cross a former railway line at both Smiley and Coleville.

== Major intersections ==
Rural municipality	Location	km	mi	Destinations	Notes
Kindersley No. 290		0.0	0.0	Highway 7 – Kindersley, Alsask	Southern terminus; continues south as Range Road 3524
Prairiedale No. 321	Smiley	17.7	11.0	Highway 772 west (Township Road 311) – Hoosier	Eastern terminus of Hwy 772
Prairiedale No. 321		25.9	16.1	Highway 675 north (Range Road 3523) – Luseland	Highway 307 changes cardinal directions from north-south to east-west; southern terminus of Hwy 675
Oakdale No. 320		47.1	29.3	Highway 21 – Kerrobert, Kindersley	Eastern terminus; road continues east as Township Road 320
1.000 mi = 1.609 km; 1.000 km = 0.621 mi

== See also ==
- Transportation in Saskatchewan
- Roads in Saskatchewan
