= Rural Municipality of Antelope Park No. 322 =

Rural municipality in Saskatchewan, Canada

Antelope Park No. 322
- Rural municipality
- Rural Municipality of Antelope Park No. 322

- Location of the RM of Antelope Park No. 322 in Saskatchewan
- Coordinates: 51.751°N 109.848°W
- Country: Canada
- Province: Saskatchewan
- Census division: 13
- SARM division: 6
- Federal riding: Battlefords--Lloydminster
- Provincial riding: Kindersley
- Formed: December 11, 1911

Government
  - Reeve: Gordon Dommett
  - Governing body: RM of Antelope Park No. 322 Council
  - Administrator: Robin Busby
  - Office location: Marengo

Area (2016)
  - Land: 612.9 km^{2} (236.6 sq mi)

Population (2016)
  - Total: 130
  - Density: 0.2/km^{2} (0.52/sq mi)
- Time zone: CST
  - Summer (DST): CST
- Postal code: S0L 2K0
- Area codes: 306 and 639

The Rural Municipality of Antelope Park No. 322 (2016 population: 130) is a rural municipality (RM) in the Canadian province of Saskatchewan within Census Division No. 13 and SARM Division No. 6. It is located along the border with Alberta.

== History ==
The RM of Antelope Park No. 322 incorporated as a rural municipality on December 11, 1911. It was named for the ubiquitous pronghorn antelope.

== Geography ==
=== Communities and localities ===
The following unincorporated communities are within the RM.

Localities

- Court
- Fusilier
- Hoosier
- Loverna, (dissolved March 10, 2003)

== Demographics ==
Population history (1981–2016)
Year	Pop.	±%
1981	231	—
1986	225	−2.6%
1991	193	−14.2%
1996	179	−7.3%
2001	172	−3.9%
2006	151	−12.2%
2011	150	−0.7%
2016	130	−13.3%
Source: Statistics Canada via Saskatchewan Bureau of Statistics

In the 2021 Census of Population conducted by Statistics Canada, the RM of Antelope Park No. 322 had a population of 124 living in 53 of its 67 total private dwellings, a change of −4.6% from its 2016 population of 130. With a land area of 609.52 km^{2} (235.34 sq mi), it had a population density of 0.2/km^{2} (0.5/sq mi) in 2021.

In the 2016 Census of Population, the RM of Antelope Park No. 322 recorded a population of 130 living in 54 of its 61 total private dwellings, a −13.3% change from its 2011 population of 150. With a land area of 612.9 km^{2} (236.6 sq mi), it had a population density of 0.2/km^{2} (0.5/sq mi) in 2016.

== Attractions ==
- Great Wall of Saskatchewan, near Smiley
- Buffalo Rubbing Stone Provincial Historic Site, near Flaxcombe
- Hoosier United Church, in Hoosier, Saskatchewan

== Government ==
The RM of Antelope Park No. 322 is governed by an elected municipal council and an appointed administrator that meets on the third Tuesday of every month. The reeve of the RM is Gordon Dommett while its administrator is Robin Busby. The RM's office is located in Marengo.

== Transportation ==
Rail

- Boundary Branch CNR abandoned in 1981—once served Millerdale, Beaufield, Coleville, Driver, Smiley, Dewar Lake, Hoosier, Greene, Loverna

Roads

- Highway 317—serves Fusilier (north to Primate) to Hoosier
- Highway 772—serves Loverna
- Highway 51—serves Fusilier to Alberta

== See also ==
- List of rural municipalities in Saskatchewan
