= Saskatchewan Highway 60 =

Provincial highway in Saskatchewan, Canada

Highway 60
- Highway 60 highlighted in red

Route information
- Maintained by Ministry of Highways and Infrastructure
- Length: 23.2 km (14.4 mi)

Major junctions
- North end: Highway 7 near Saskatoon
- South end: Pike Lake Provincial Park

Location
- Country: Canada
- Province: Saskatchewan
- Rural municipalities: Corman Park, Vanscoy

Highway system
- Provincial highways in Saskatchewan
← Highway 58	→ Highway 80

Highway 60 is a provincial highway in the Canadian province of Saskatchewan. It runs from Highway 7 near Saskatoon to Pike Lake Provincial Park at Pike Lake. The speed limit is 90 km/h (55 mph). The highway is approximately 23 kilometres (14 mi) long.

Highway 60 serves as a link connecting Saskatoon to Pike Lake Provincial Park, as well as acreages and businesses in the area. The Saskatchewan Railway Museum is located at the Hawker Siding about 3 kilometres (1.9 mi) from Highway 7. Hawker Siding was previously known as Eaton Siding.

== Major intersections ==
From north to south:

Location	km	mi	Destinations	Notes
Corman Park No. 344	0.0	0.0	Highway 7 – Saskatoon, Rosetown	Northern terminus
Corman Park No. 344	11.0	6.8	Highway 762 (Valley Road / Vanscoy Road) – Saskatoon, Vanscoy	
Vanscoy No. 345	21.0	13.0	Highway 766 west – Delisle	
Vanscoy No. 345	23.2	14.4	Pike Lake Provincial Park	
1.000 mi = 1.609 km; 1.000 km = 0.621 mi

== Photo gallery ==
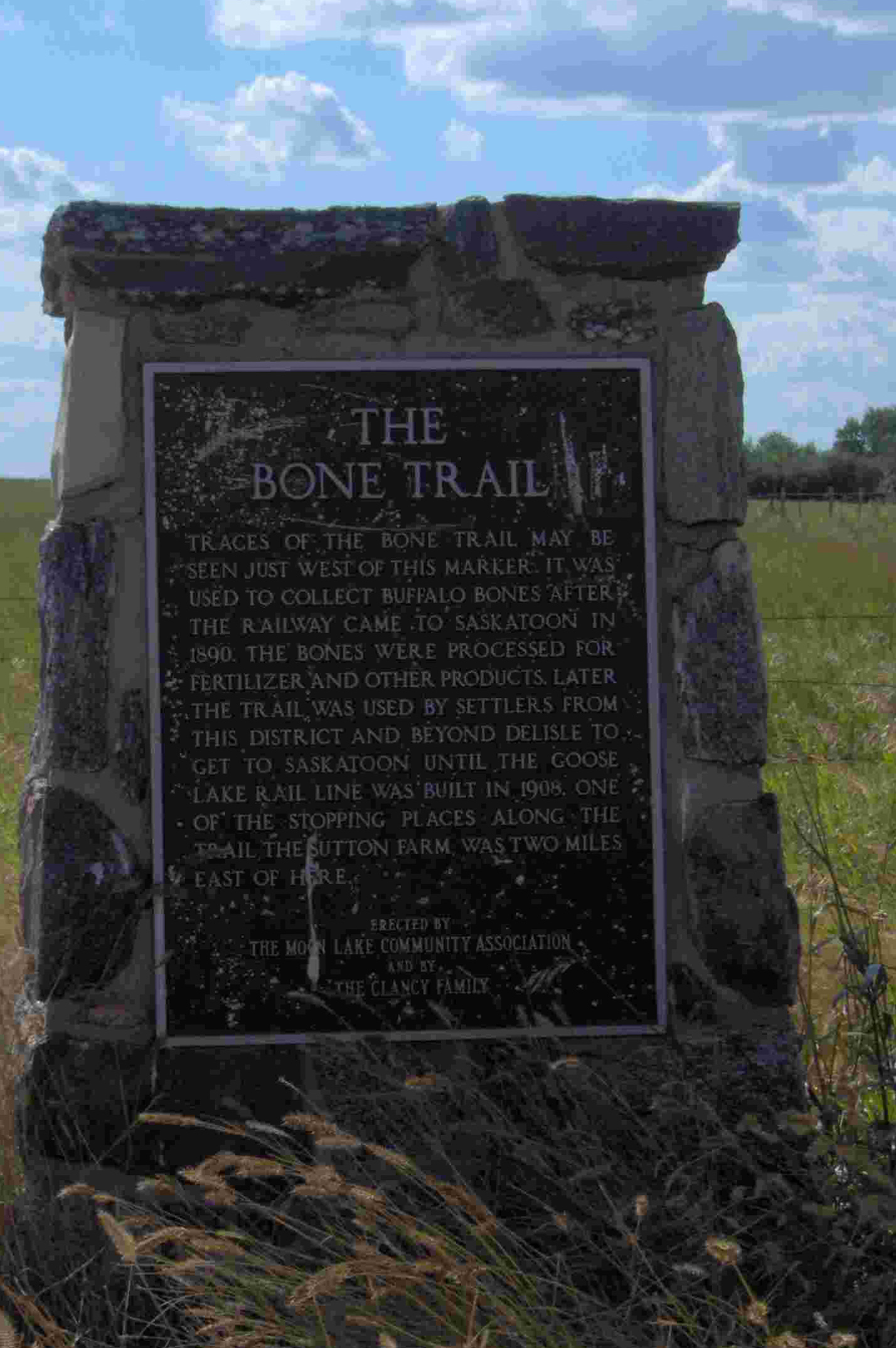
Bone Trail marker along Hwy 60

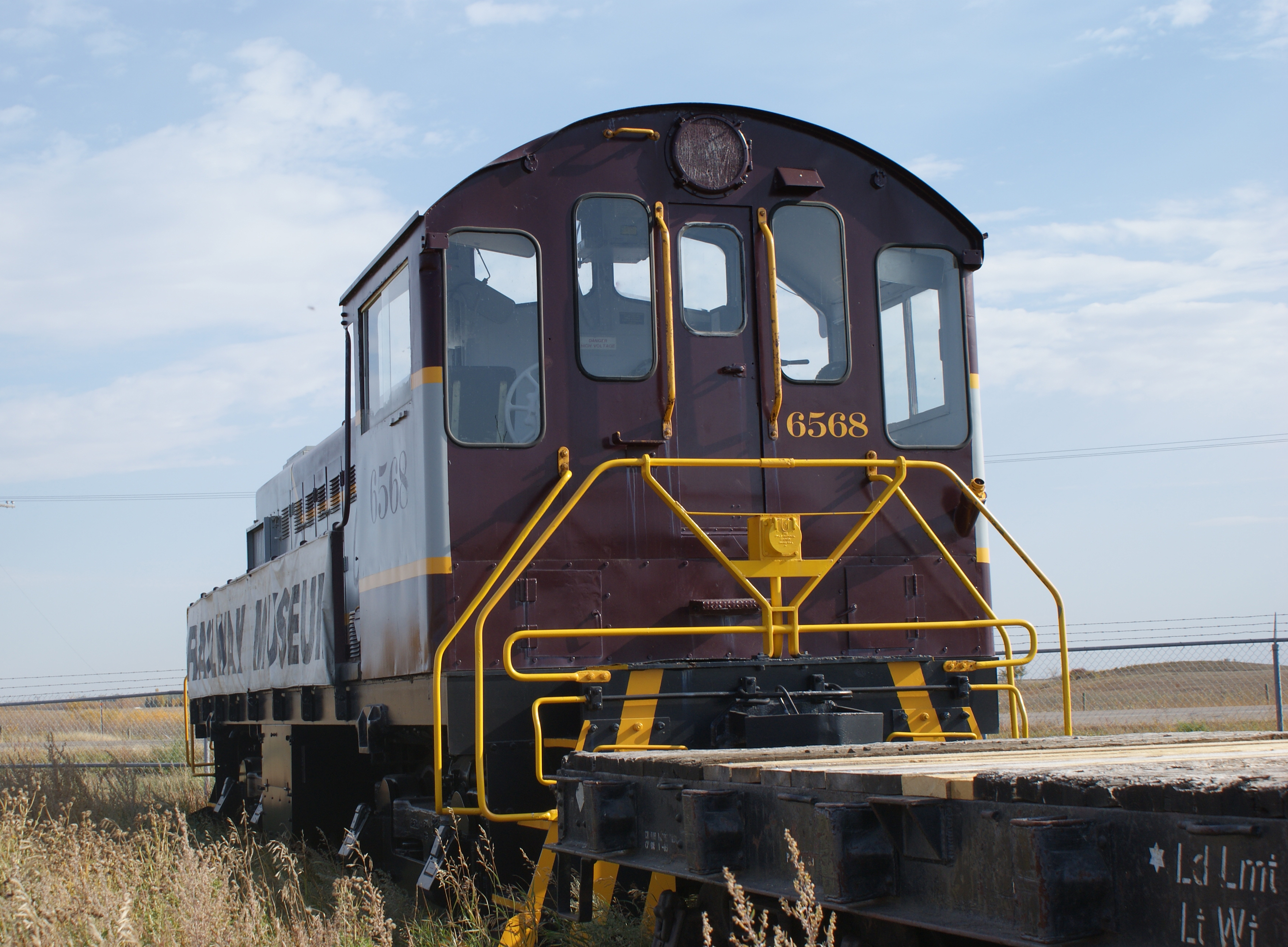
Saskatchewan Railway Museum

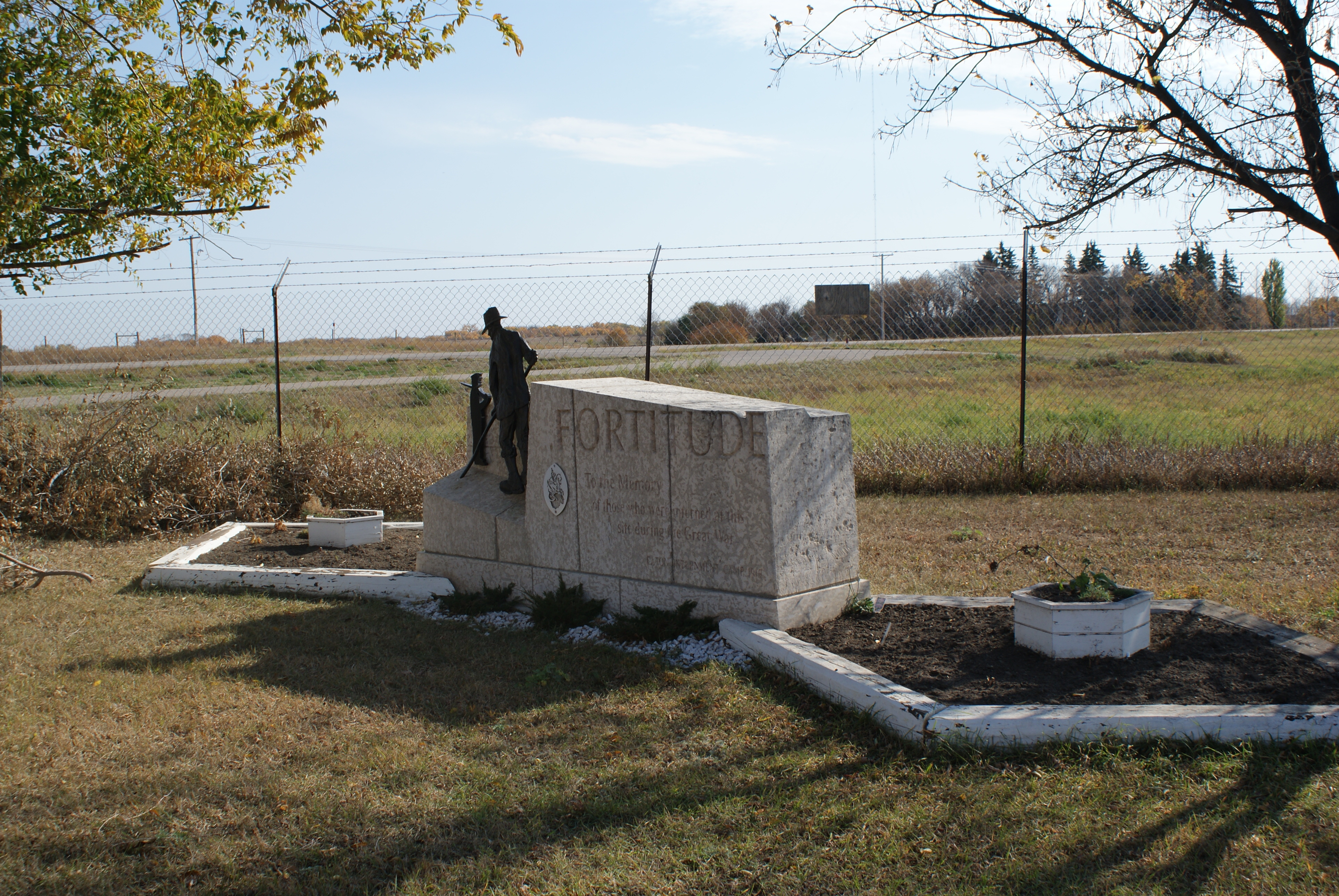
Eaton Internment Camp of World War I

== See also ==
- Transportation in Saskatchewan
- Roads in Saskatchewan
