= Pike Lake (Saskatchewan) =

Lake in Saskatchewan, Canada

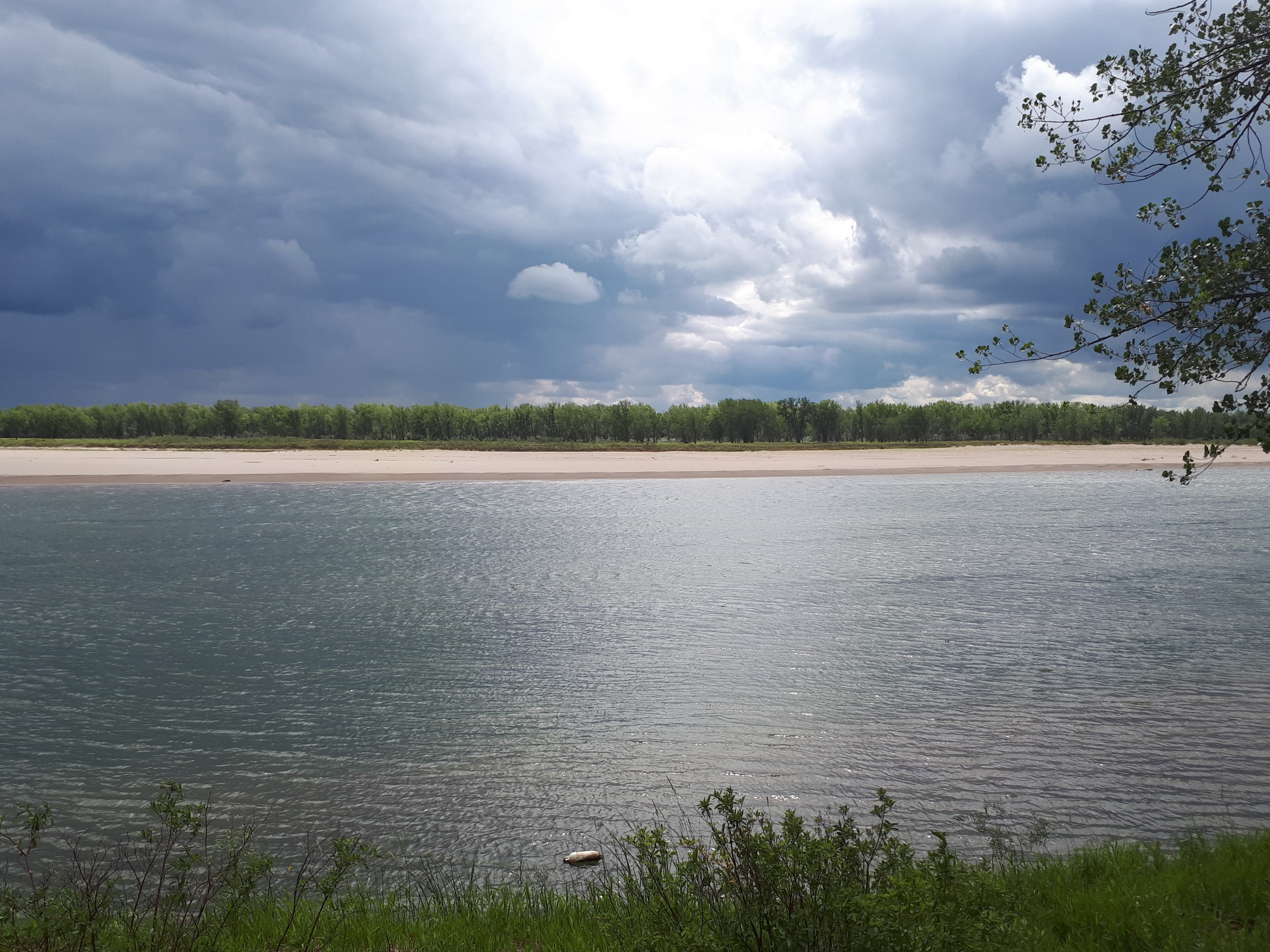
- Pike Lake

- Location in Saskatchewan Pike Lake (Canada)
- Location: RM of Vanscoy No. 345, Saskatchewan
- Coordinates: 51.9000°N 106.8173°W
- Type: Oxbow lake
- Part of: Saskatchewan River drainage basin
- Basin countries: Canada
- Managing agency: Saskatchewan Water Security Agency
- Max. length: 4 km (2.5 mi)
- Surface area: 258.79 ha (639.5 acres)
- Max. depth: 2.5 m (8 ft 2 in)
- Shore length^{1}: 20.66 km (12.84 mi)
- Surface elevation: 478 m (1,568 ft)
- Settlements: Pike Lake
- ^{1} Shore length is not a well-defined measure.

Pike Lake is an oxbow lake of the South Saskatchewan River in the Canadian province of Saskatchewan. It is about 36 kilometres (22 mi) south of downtown Saskatoon in the RM of Vanscoy No. 345, 2.5 kilometres (1.6 mi) west of the South Saskatchewan River. The lake is in the aspen parkland transitional biome between prairie and boreal forest in Palliser's Triangle.

Most of the southern half of Pike Lake is in Pike Lake Provincial Park and access to the lake is from Highways 60 and 766. An unincorporated rural residential community by the same name, Pike Lake, is located on the western shore at the northern boundary of Pike Lake Provincial Park. The community includes a school and a recreation centre. Trees around the lake include aspen, ash, and birch.

== Pike Lake Water Supply ==
Lake water levels are controlled by a 1.5-metre high, 280-metre long spur dyke (51.9019°N 106.7921°W) that diverts water from the South Saskatchewan River (51.8791°N 106.7579°W). The Pike Lake Water Supply, as it is known, is operated by the Saskatchewan Water Security Agency. Originally constructed in 1948, significant upgrades were done in the 1960s with a new pump and supply canal. By the 1990s, the South Saskatchewan River had naturally shifted course and the water levels at Pike Lake had dropped. In 1999, major upgrades were completed to the system to restore water levels. Further upgrades to the pump and canal were undertaken in 2020 at a cost of $2.8 million.

== Recreation ==
Pike Lake Provincial Park is the main attraction on the lake. The park includes a large campground with 222 sites, an outdoor pool with a waterslide, mini-golf, a 1.5 kilometre nature trail, fishing, and beach access.

At the northern end of the lake is Camp Seeonee, which is a Scouts Canada camp. The camp is made up of two villages with cabins, campgrounds, picnic areas, and outdoor camp kitchens.

== Fish species ==
The fish species most commonly found in Pike Lake is the northern pike.

== See also ==
- List of lakes of Saskatchewan
