= Beadle, Saskatchewan =

Human settlement in Saskatchewan, Canada

Coordinates: 51°28′29″N 109°00′14″W

Location of Beadle in Saskatchewan

Beadle is a small unincorporated community in the Rural Municipality of Kindersley No. 290, Saskatchewan, Canada. It lies just outside the town of Kindersley about 1.6 kilometres (1 mi) south of Highway 7.

== See also ==
- List of communities in Saskatchewan
