= Brisbin, Saskatchewan =

Brisbin
- Unincorporated community
- Location within Saskatchewan
- Coordinates: 51°40′N 107°40′W
- Country: Canada
- Province: Saskatchewan
- Region: Saskatchewan
- Rural Municipality: Harris

Government
  - Governing body: Harris RM
- Time zone: CST
- Area code: 306
- Highways: Highway 55

Brisbin is an unincorporated community within the rural municipality of Harris.

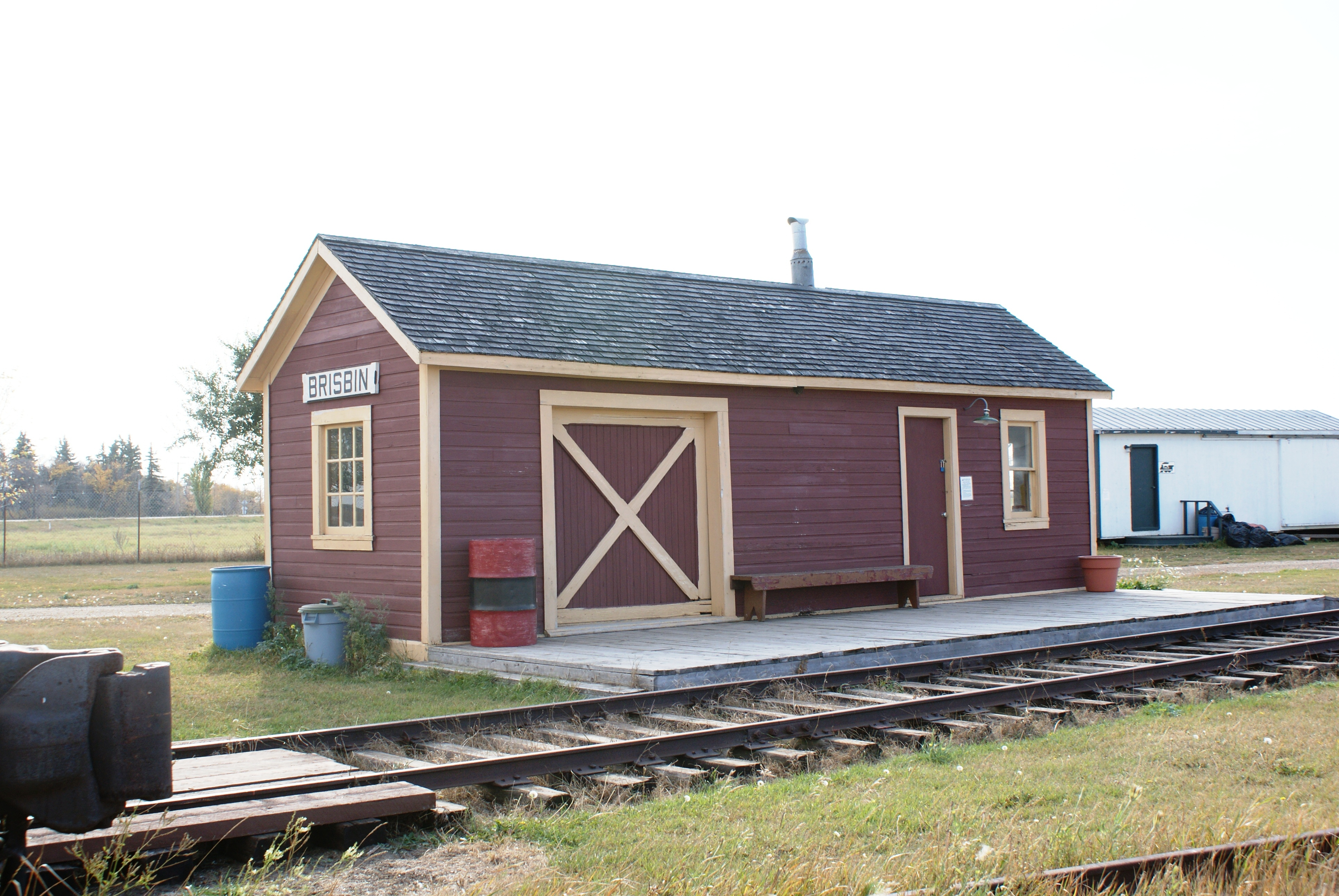
Canadian Northern Portable Train Station for Debden and later Brisbin, Saskatchewan

== See also ==
- List of communities in Saskatchewan
