= Rural Municipality of Prairiedale No. 321 =

Rural municipality in Saskatchewan, Canada

Prairiedale No. 321
- Rural municipality
- Rural Municipality of Prairiedale No. 321
- Location of the RM of Prairiedale No. 321 in Saskatchewan
- Coordinates: 51.737°N 109.539°W
- Country: Canada
- Province: Saskatchewan
- Census division: 13
- SARM division: 6
- Formed: December 13, 1909

Government
  - Reeve: Garnet Jeffries
  - Governing body: RM of Prairiedale No. 321 Council
  - Administrator: Charlotte Helfrich
  - Office location: Major

Area (2016)
  - Land: 546.74 km^{2} (211.10 sq mi)

Population (2016)
  - Total: 247
  - Density: 0.5/km^{2} (1.3/sq mi)
- Time zone: CST
  - Summer (DST): CST
- Area codes: 306 and 639

The Rural Municipality of Prairiedale No. 321 (2016 population: 247) is a rural municipality (RM) in the Canadian province of Saskatchewan within Census Division No. 13 and SARM Division No. 6. Located in the west-central portion of the province, it is adjacent to the Alberta boundary.

== History ==
The RM of Prairiedale No. 321 incorporated as a rural municipality on December 13, 1909.

== Geography ==
=== Communities and localities ===
The following urban municipalities are surrounded by the RM.

Villages

- Major
- Smiley

The following unincorporated communities are within the RM.

Localities

- Dewar Lake

== Demographics ==
Population history (1981–2016)
Year	Pop.	±%
1981	409	—
1986	402	−1.7%
1991	362	−10.0%
1996	263	−27.3%
2001	277	+5.3%
2006	271	−2.2%
2011	253	−6.6%
2016	247	−2.4%
Source: Statistics Canada via Saskatchewan Bureau of Statistics

In the 2021 Census of Population conducted by Statistics Canada, the RM of Prairiedale No. 321 had a population of 246 living in 48 of its 61 total private dwellings, a change of −0.4% from its 2016 population of 247. With a land area of 556.2 km^{2} (214.8 sq mi), it had a population density of 0.4/km^{2} (1.1/sq mi) in 2021.

In the 2016 Census of Population, the RM of Prairiedale No. 321 recorded a population of 247 living in 49 of its 65 total private dwellings, a −2.4% change from its 2011 population of 253. With a land area of 546.74 km^{2} (211.10 sq mi), it had a population density of 0.5/km^{2} (1.2/sq mi) in 2016.

== Attractions ==
- Great Wall of Saskatchewan

== Government ==
The RM of Prairiedale No. 321 is governed by an elected municipal council and an appointed administrator that meets on the second Tuesday of every month. The reeve of the RM is Tim Richelhoff while its administrator is Charlotte Helfrich. The RM's office is located in Major.

== See also ==
- List of rural municipalities in Saskatchewan
