= Rural Municipality of Pleasant Valley No. 288 =

Rural municipality in Saskatchewan, Canada

Pleasant Valley No. 288
- Rural municipality
- Rural Municipality of Pleasant Valley No. 288

- Location of the RM of Pleasant Valley No. 288 in Saskatchewan
- Coordinates: 51.489°N 108.324°W
- Country: Canada
- Province: Saskatchewan
- Census division: 12
- SARM division: 6
- Formed: December 11, 1911

Government
  - Reeve: Blake Jeffries
  - Governing body: RM of Pleasant Valley No. 288 Council
  - Administrator: Jill Palichuk
  - Office location: Rosetown

Area (2016)
  - Land: 830.53 km^{2} (320.67 sq mi)

Population (2016)
  - Total: 302
  - Density: 0.4/km^{2} (1.0/sq mi)
- Time zone: CST
  - Summer (DST): CST
- Area codes: 306 and 639

The Rural Municipality of Pleasant Valley No. 288 (2016 population: 302) is a rural municipality (RM) in the Canadian province of Saskatchewan within Census Division No. 12 and SARM Division No. 6.

== History ==
The RM of Pleasant Valley No. 288 incorporated as a rural municipality on December 11, 1911.

== Geography ==
=== Communities and localities ===
The following unincorporated communities are within the RM.

Organized hamlets

- Fiske

Localities

- Anglia
- D'Arcy
- McGee (dissolved as a village, December 31, 1955)
- Ridpath

== Demographics ==
Population history (1981–2016)
| Year | Pop. | ±% |
|---|---|---|
| 1981 | 498 | — |
| 1986 | 481 | −3.4% |
| 1991 | 462 | −4.0% |
| 1996 | 418 | −9.5% |
| 2001 | 379 | −9.3% |
| 2006 | 346 | −8.7% |
| 2011 | 345 | −0.3% |
| 2016 | 302 | −12.5% |
Source: Statistics Canada via Saskatchewan Bureau of Statistics

In the 2021 Census of Population conducted by Statistics Canada, the RM of Pleasant Valley No. 288 had a population of 301 living in 95 of its 116 total private dwellings, a change of −0.3% from its 2016 population of 302. With a land area of 822.47 km^{2} (317.56 sq mi), it had a population density of 0.4/km^{2} (0.9/sq mi) in 2021.

In the 2016 Census of Population, the RM of Pleasant Valley No. 288 recorded a population of 302 living in 108 of its 139 total private dwellings, a −12.5% change from its 2011 population of 345. With a land area of 830.53 km^{2} (320.67 sq mi), it had a population density of 0.4/km^{2} (0.9/sq mi) in 2016.

== Government ==
The RM of Pleasant Valley No. 288 is governed by an elected municipal council and an appointed administrator that meets on the second Thursday of every month. The reeve of the RM is Blake Jeffries while its administrator is Jill Palichuk. The RM's office is located in Rosetown.

== Transportation ==
- Saskatchewan Highway 7
- Canadian National Railway

== See also ==
- List of rural municipalities in Saskatchewan
