= Court, Saskatchewan =

Hamlet in Saskatchewan, Canada

Court is an unincorporated hamlet in the Rural Municipality of Antelope Park No. 322, Saskatchewan, Canada. The hamlet is approximately 50 kilometres (31 mi) west of the town of Kerrobert at the intersection of Highway 51 and Range road 282. The Canadian Pacific Railway played a big role in the town's economy when it was completed in 1914. Due to the closure of smaller branch lines in the 1980s the tracks from Kerrobert to Court were pulled and Court's population has since declined.

== See also ==
- List of communities in Saskatchewan
- List of hamlets in Saskatchewan
