= Hoosier United Church =

Church in Antelope Park, Canada

Coordinates: 51.6258°N 109.7409°W

- Interactive map of the Hoosier United Church area

General information
- Architectural style: Gothic Revival
- Location: Hamlet of Hoosier, Antelope Park No. 322, Saskatchewan, Canada
- Completed: 1916

The Hoosier United Church is a municipal designated historic building located in the former hamlet of Hoosier in the Rural Municipality of Antelope Park, Saskatchewan, Canada. The Gothic Revival wooden building was used for church services from 1916 until 1966 when it was repurposed as a community centre. It remained in use as a community centre until the 1990s.
