= Rural Municipality of Harris No. 316 =

Rural municipality in Saskatchewan, Canada

Harris No. 316
- Rural municipality
- Rural Municipality of Harris No. 316
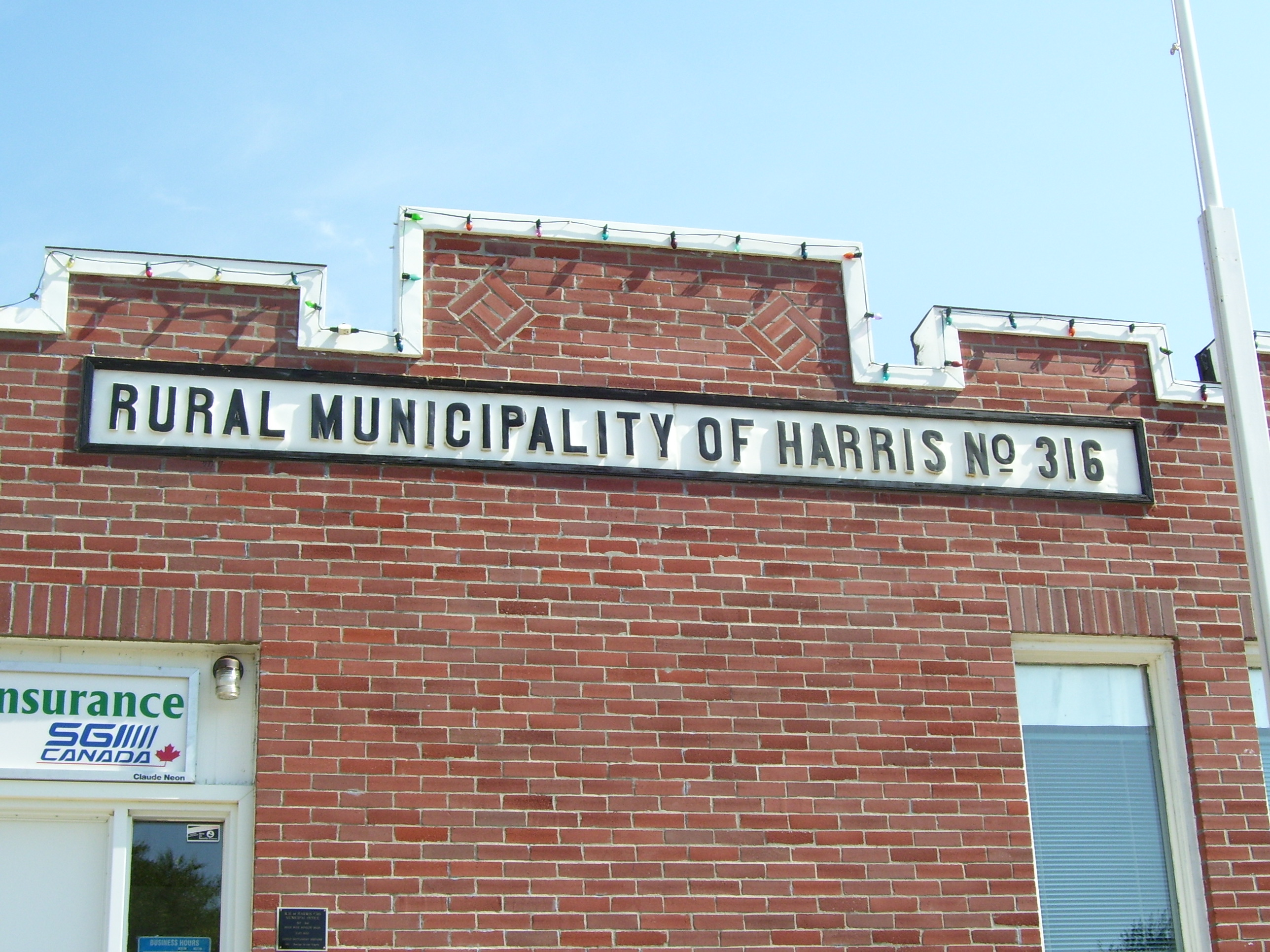
- RM's office building in the Town of Harris

- Location of the RM of Harris No. 316 in Saskatchewan
- Coordinates: 51.738°N 107.500°W
- Country: Canada
- Province: Saskatchewan
- Census division: 12
- SARM division: 5
- Formed: December 12, 1910

Government
  - Reeve: David Husband
  - Governing body: RM of Harris No. 316 Council
  - Administrator: Adrienne Urban
  - Office location: Harris

Area (2016)
  - Land: 805.42 km^{2} (310.97 sq mi)

Population (2016)
  - Total: 193
  - Density: 0.2/km^{2} (0.52/sq mi)
- Time zone: CST
  - Summer (DST): CST
- Area codes: 306 and 639

The Rural Municipality of Harris No. 316 (2016 population: 193) is a rural municipality (RM) in the Canadian province of Saskatchewan within Census Division No. 12 and SARM Division No. 5.

== History ==
The RM of Harris No. 316 incorporated as a rural municipality on December 12, 1910.

== Geography ==
=== Communities and localities ===
The following urban municipalities are surrounded by the RM:

Villages

- Harris
- Tessier

The following unincorporated communities are within the RM:

Localities

- Brisbin
- Crystal Beach

== Demographics ==
Population history (1981–2016)
| Year | Pop. | ±% |
|---|---|---|
| 1981 | 392 | — |
| 1986 | 332 | −15.3% |
| 1991 | 295 | −11.1% |
| 1996 | 276 | −6.4% |
| 2001 | 239 | −13.4% |
| 2006 | 195 | −18.4% |
| 2011 | 224 | +14.9% |
| 2016 | 193 | −13.8% |
Source: Statistics Canada via Saskatchewan Bureau of Statistics

In the 2021 Census of Population conducted by Statistics Canada, the RM of Harris No. 316 had a population of 205 living in 85 of its 96 total private dwellings, a change of 6.2% from its 2016 population of 193. With a land area of 807.34 km^{2} (311.72 sq mi), it had a population density of 0.3/km^{2} (0.7/sq mi) in 2021.

In the 2016 Census of Population, the RM of Harris No. 316 recorded a population of 193 living in 83 of its 95 total private dwellings, a −13.8% change from its 2011 population of 224. With a land area of 805.42 km^{2} (310.97 sq mi), it had a population density of 0.2/km^{2} (0.6/sq mi) in 2016.

== Attractions ==
- Leonard Farm Museum
- Crystal Beach Regional Park
- Crystal Beach Lake Prairie National Wildlife Area
- Prairie National Wildlife Area
- Harris Heritage Museum

== Government ==
The RM of Harris No. 316 is governed by an elected municipal council and an appointed administrator that meets on the second Wednesday of every month. The reeve of the RM is David Husband while its administrator is Adrienne Urban. The RM's office is located in Harris.

== Transportation ==
- Saskatchewan Highway 7
- Saskatchewan Highway 655
- Saskatchewan Highway 768
- Canadian National Railway

== See also ==
- List of rural municipalities in Saskatchewan
