= Tessier, Saskatchewan =

Village in Saskatchewan, Canada

Tessier
- Hamlet
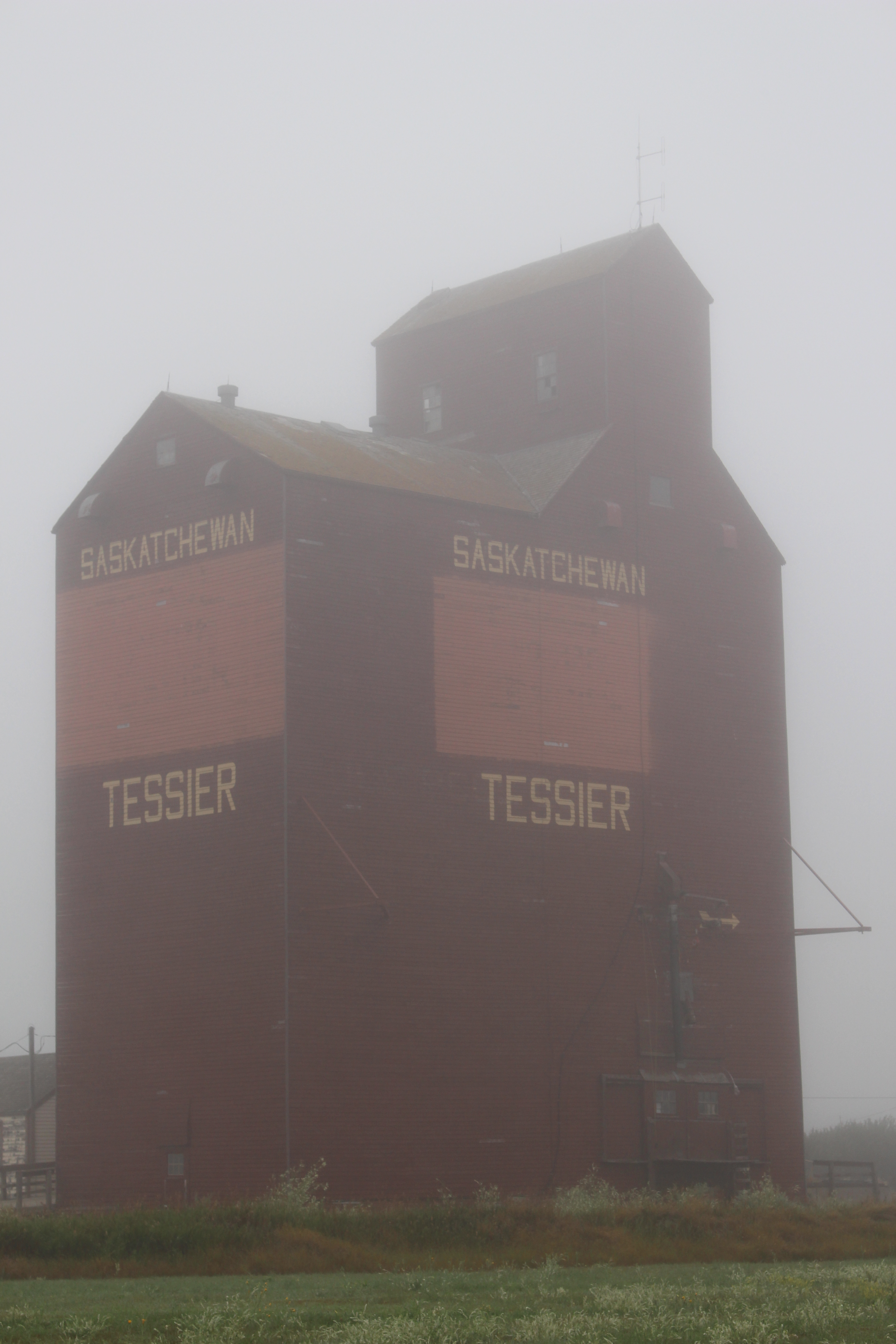
- Former Saskatchewan Wheat Pool grain elevator in Tessier on a foggy morning

- Location within Saskatchewan Location within Canada
- Coordinates: 51.482257°N 107.255890°W
- Country: Canada
- Province: Saskatchewan
- Region: Central
- Census division: 12
- Rural municipality: Harris No. 316

Government
  - Governing body: Tessier Village Council
  - Mayor: Maurice Hanson Jr.
  - Administrator: Barbara Shaw

Area
  - Total: 1.00 km^{2} (0.39 sq mi)

Population (2016)
  - Total: 25
  - Density: 25/km^{2} (65/sq mi)
  - Dwellings: 15
- Time zone: CST
- Postal code: S0L 3G0
- Area code: 306
- Highways: Highway 7
- Railways: Canadian National Railway

Tessier (2016 population: 25) is a village in the Canadian province of Saskatchewan within the Rural Municipality of Harris No. 316 and Census Division No. 12. The village is located approximately 60 kilometres (37 mi) southwest of the city of Saskatoon on Highway 7.

== History ==
Tessier incorporated as a village on August 24, 1909.

== Demographics ==
Population history (1981–2016)
Year	Pop.	±%
1981	37	—
1986	36	−2.7%
1991	39	+8.3%
1996	29	−25.6%
2001	30	+3.4%
2006	20	−33.3%
2011	25	+25.0%
2016	25	+0.0%
Source: Statistics Canada via Saskatchewan Bureau of Statistics

In the 2021 Census of Population conducted by Statistics Canada, Tessier had a population of 25 living in 12 of its 15 total private dwellings, a change of 0% from its 2016 population of 25. With a land area of 1 km^{2} (0.39 sq mi), it had a population density of 25.0/km^{2} (64.7/sq mi) in 2021.

In the 2016 Census of Population, the Village of Tessier recorded a population of 25 living in 10 of its 15 total private dwellings, a 0% change from its 2011 population of 25. With a land area of 1 km^{2} (0.39 sq mi), it had a population density of 25.0/km^{2} (64.7/sq mi) in 2016.

== See also ==
- List of communities in Saskatchewan
- List of villages in Saskatchewan
