= Fiske, Saskatchewan =

Community in Saskatchewan, Canada

Fiske
- Organized Hamlet
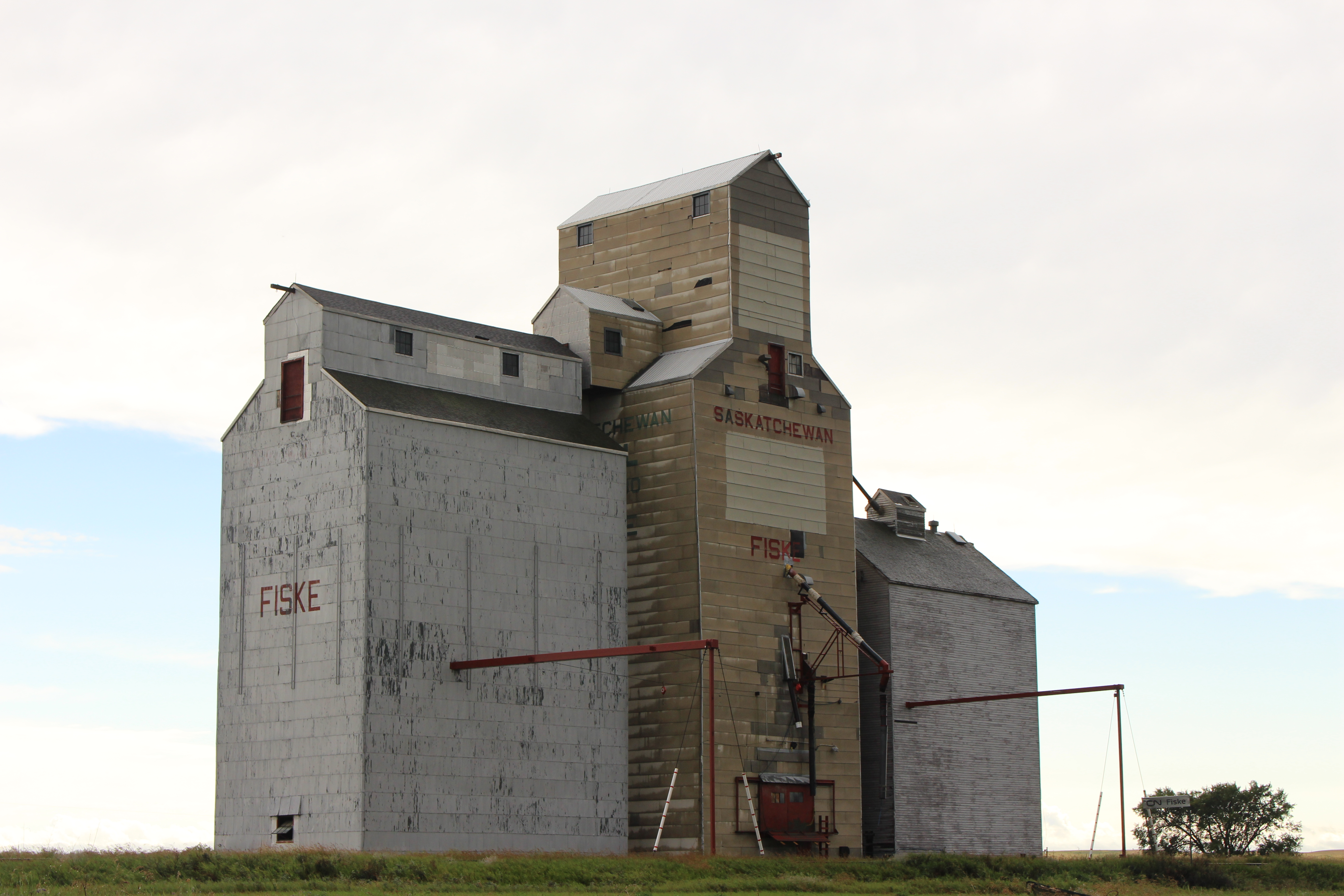
- Former Saskatchewan Wheat Pool grain elevator in Fiske.

- Location within Saskatchewan Location within Canada
- Coordinates: 51°29′11″N 108°24′15″W
- Country: Canada
- Province: Saskatchewan
- Region: West Central Saskatchewan
- Census division: 12
- Rural municipality: Pleasant Valley No. 288

Government
  - Governing body: Fiske Council

Population (2016)
  - Total: 65
  - Density: 128.5/km^{2} (333/sq mi)
- Time zone: CST
- Area code: 306
- Highways: Highway 7 & Highway 656
- Railways: Canadian National Railway

Fiske is a hamlet in the Rural Municipality of Pleasant Valley No. 288, Saskatchewan, Canada. Listed as a designated place by Statistics Canada, the hamlet had a population of 65 in the Canada 2016 Census. Fiske is located approximately 53.7 kilometres (33.4 mi) east of Kindersley and 30.6 kilometres (19.0 mi) west of Rosetown on Highway 7.

== Demographics ==
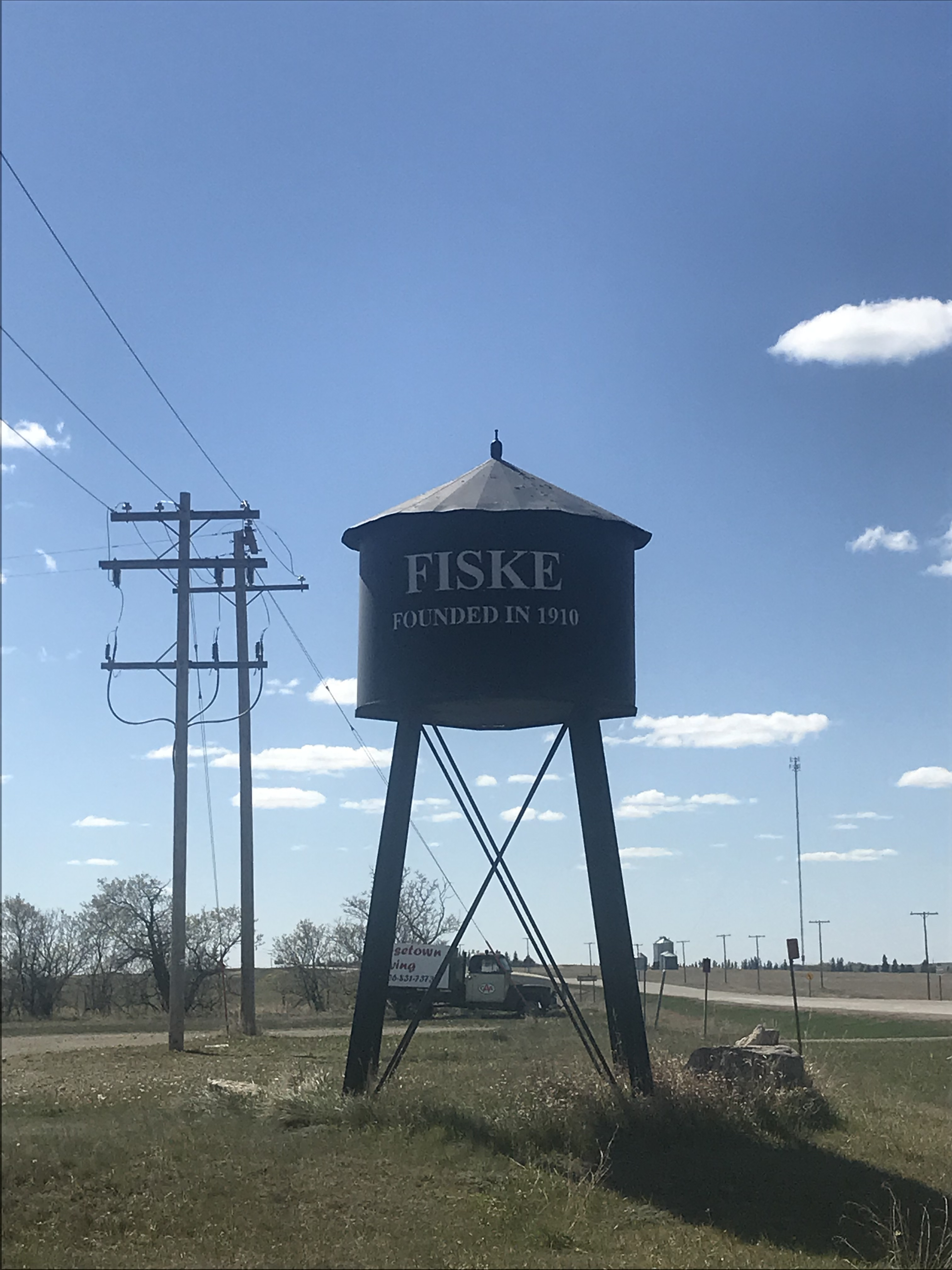
Water tower in Fiske, Saskatchewan

In the 2021 Census of Population conducted by Statistics Canada, Fiske had a population of 74 living in 30 of its 36 total private dwellings, a change of 13.8% from its 2016 population of 65. With a land area of 0.54 km^{2} (0.21 sq mi), it had a population density of 137.0/km^{2} (354.9/sq mi) in 2021.

Canada census – Fiske, Saskatchewan community profile

| | 2016 |
| Population | 65 (- 40.9% from 2011) |
| Land area | 0.51 km^{2} (0.20 sq mi) |
| Population density | 128.5/km^{2} (333/sq mi) |
| Median age | 40.7 (M: 40.4, F: 41.5) |
| Private dwellings | 39 (total) |
| Median household income | $N/A |

References: 2016

== Economy ==
Grain farming, ranching, and trades are the main sectors in which Fiskinites are employed. Oil and gas is another source of income that has recently opened up in the area. Fiske hosts an ice arena, community hall, and a few home businesses. Many residents travel to nearby Rosetown 30.6 kilometres (19.0 mi) east of Fiske, for all other services.

== See also ==
- List of communities in Saskatchewan
- List of hamlets in Saskatchewan
