= McGee, Saskatchewan =

Community in Saskatchewan, Canada

McGee is a hamlet in the Rural Municipality of Pleasant Valley No. 288, Saskatchewan, Canada. Access is from Highway 7. It previously held the status of a village until December 31, 1955.

Along with D'Arcy, the community is named after the Father of Confederation, D'Arcy McGee.

== History ==
Prior to December 31, 1955, McGee was incorporated as a village, and was restructured as a hamlet under the jurisdiction of the Rural Municipality of Pleasant Valley No. 288 on that date.

== See also ==
- List of communities in Saskatchewan
- List of hamlets in Saskatchewan
