= D'Arcy, Saskatchewan =

Community in Saskatchewan, Canada

D'Arcy
- Unincorporated community
- Location within Saskatchewan Location within Canada
- Coordinates: 51.465811°N 108.540231°W
- Country: Canada
- Province: Saskatchewan
- Region: Southwest Saskatchewan
- Census division: 12
- Rural municipality: Pleasant Valley No. 288

Government
  - Governing body: Pleasant Valley No. 288
- Time zone: Central Standard Time (CST)
- Area code: 306
- Highways: Highway 7
- Railways: Canadian National Railway

D'Arcy is an unincorporated community in Rural Municipality of Pleasant Valley No. 288 in western-central Saskatchewan, Canada. The post office started out with the name D'Arcy Station in 1911 in the Federal Electoral District of Kindersley. Along with McGee, Saskatchewan, the town is named after the Father of Confederation, D'Arcy McGee.

== Transportation ==
D'Arcy was also a Canadian National Railway station on the Saskatoon – Calgary Branch line.

== Education ==
D'Arcy is located within the Sun West School Division. D'Arcy School District No. 3016 was the first one-room school house in D'Arcy region.

== See also ==
- List of communities in Saskatchewan
