= Netherhill =

Village in Saskatchewan, Canada

- Village
- Village of Netherhill
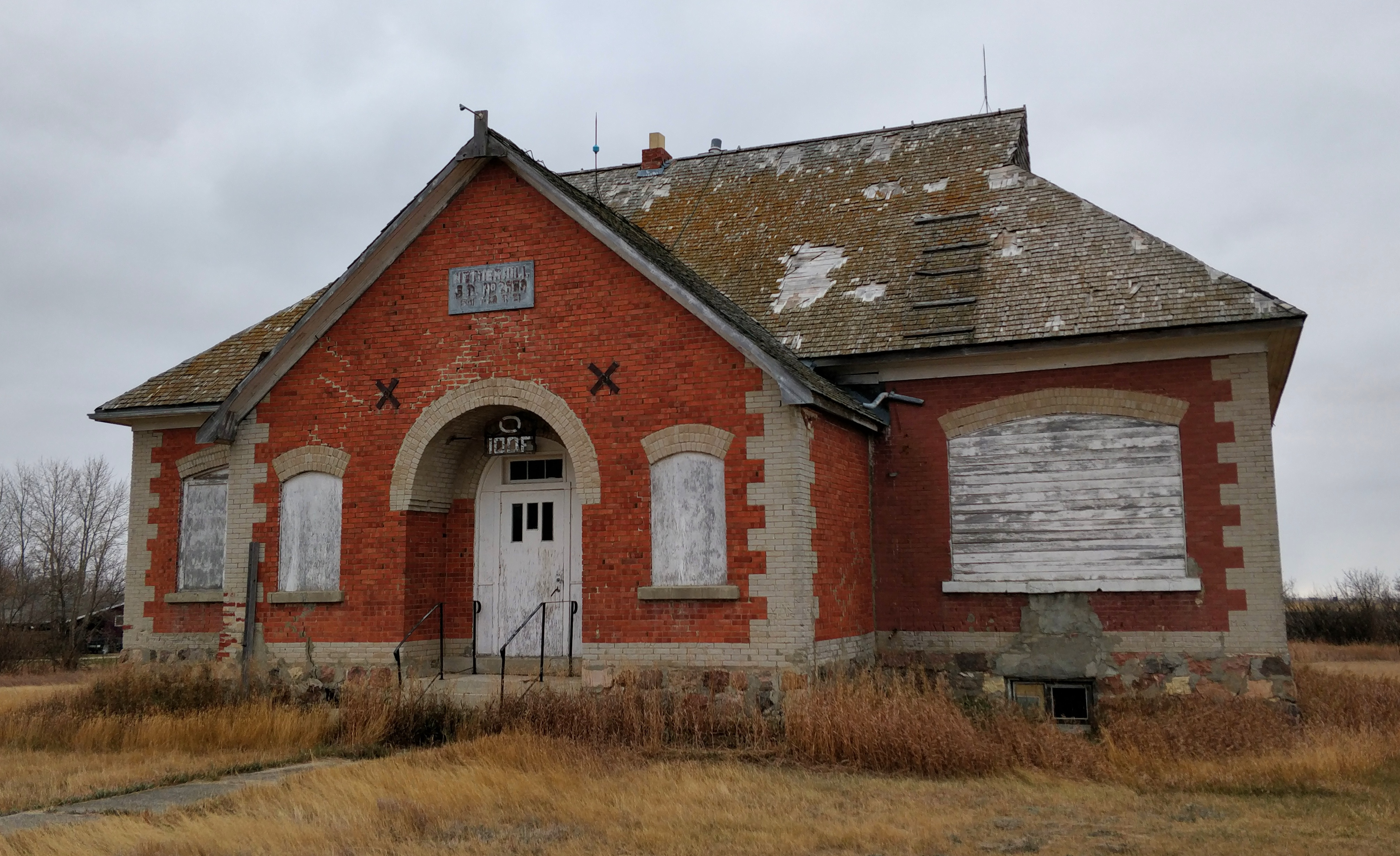
- Abandoned brick schoolhouse

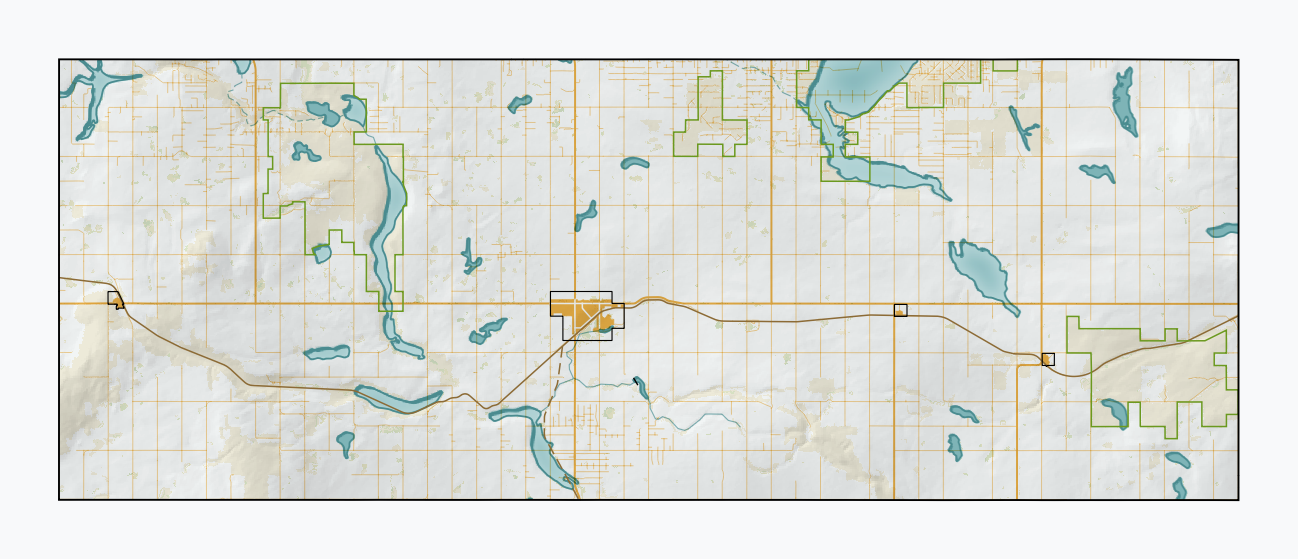
- Location within Kindersley No. 290 Location within Saskatchewan
- Coordinates: 51.4704°N 108.8587°W
- Country: Canada
- Province: Saskatchewan
- Rural municipality: Kindersley No. 290

Government
  - Type: Municipal
  - Governing body: Netherhill Village Council
  - Mayor: Lorne Gerwing
  - Administrator: Leona Henderson
  - MLA: Kim Gartner
  - MP: Jeremy Patzer

Area
  - Total: 0.73 km^{2} (0.28 sq mi)

Population (2016)
  - Total: 25
  - Urban density: 34.2/km^{2} (89/sq mi)
- Time zone: CST
- Postal code: S0L 2M0
- Area code: 306
- Highways: Highway 7 Highway 658
- Railways: Canadian National Railway

Netherhill (2016 population: 25) is a village in the Canadian province of Saskatchewan within the Rural Municipality of Kindersley No. 290 and Census Division No. 13. The village is located approximately 20 kilometres (12 mi) east of the town of Kindersley at the junction of Highway 7 and 658.

== History ==
Netherhill incorporated as a village on April 28, 1910.

== Demographics ==
Population history (1981–2016)
Year	Pop.	±%
1981	55	—
1986	74	+34.5%
1991	48	−35.1%
1996	39	−18.8%
2001	35	−10.3%
2006	30	−14.3%
2011	25	−16.7%
2016	25	+0.0%
Source: Statistics Canada via Saskatchewan Bureau of Statistics

In the 2021 Census of Population conducted by Statistics Canada, Netherhill had a population of 25 living in 15 of its 17 total private dwellings, a change of 0% from its 2016 population of 25. With a land area of 0.77 km^{2} (0.30 sq mi), it had a population density of 32.5/km^{2} (84.1/sq mi) in 2021.

In the 2016 Census of Population, the Village of Netherhill recorded a population of 25 living in 12 of its 14 total private dwellings, a 0% change from its 2011 population of 25. With a land area of 0.73 km^{2} (0.28 sq mi), it had a population density of 34.2/km^{2} (88.7/sq mi) in 2016.

== Notable people ==
- Bob Bourne, retired professional ice hockey left wing, played in the NHL between 1974 and 1988.
- Roxana Spicer, documentary filmmaker and CBC investigative journalist

== See also ==
- List of communities in Saskatchewan
- List of villages in Saskatchewan
