= Grandora =

Community in Saskatchewan, Canada

Coordinates: 52.063°N 106.584°W

Location of Grandora in Saskatchewan

Grandora is a hamlet in Saskatchewan, Canada. It is approximately 24 kilometres (15 mi) west of Saskatoon, just south of Highway 14 in the Rural Municipality of Vanscoy No. 345. Very little remains of the original settlement.

The story of how Grandora received its name is a sweet one. Apparently a newly married couple, looking to settle, ventured west to find a homestead. At one point the husband found a spot he liked and remarked "Isn't it just grand, Dora?!", and so the spot was named Grandora.

== See also ==
- List of communities in Saskatchewan
