= Pike Lake Provincial Park =

Provincial park in Saskatchewan, Canada

Pike Lake
- IUCN category V (protected landscape/seascape)
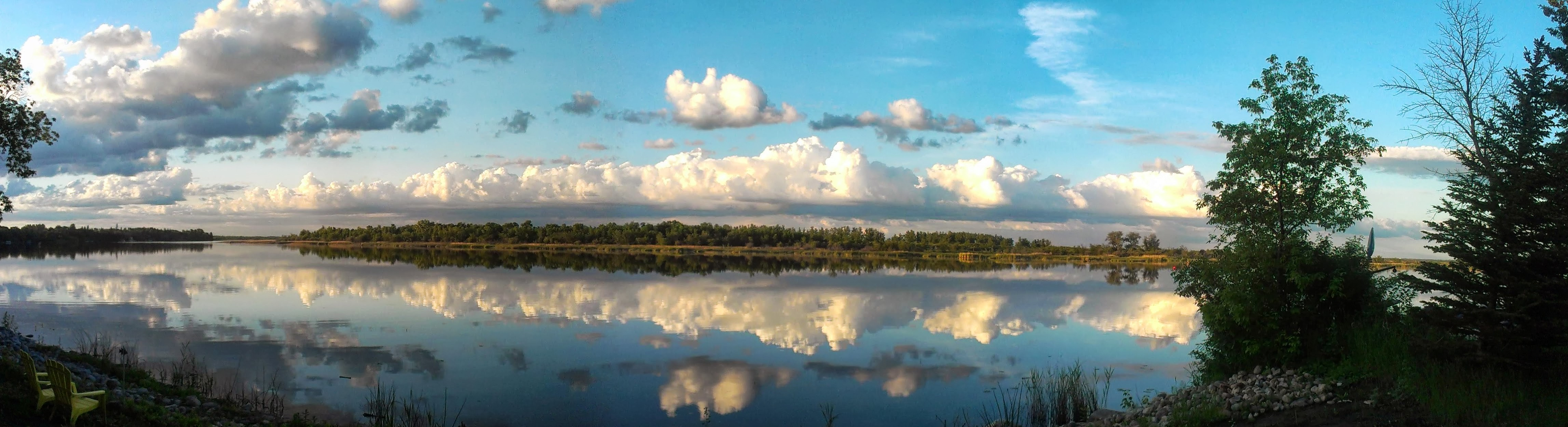
- Pike Lake Provincial Park

- Location within Saskatchewan Location within Canada
- Interactive map of Pike Lake
- Location: Saskatchewan
- Nearest city: Saskatoon
- Coordinates: 51°53′48″N 106°49′05″W
- Average elevation: 478 metres
- Established: 1960
- Governing body: Sask Parks

Pike Lake Provincial Park is a provincial recreational park located approximately 32 kilometres (20 mi) south-west of Saskatoon, Saskatchewan. Established in 1960, it is operated under the Government of Saskatchewan's Ministry of Parks, Culture, and Sport. It is located at the southern terminus of Highway 60 on the shore of Pike Lake, an oxbow lake created by the South Saskatchewan River. The Pike Lake area is part of the aspen parkland biome, and trees found around the park include aspen, ash, and birch.

Several small residential subdivisions are located within the park on the west side of the lake and there is an unincorporated rural residential community immediately adjacent to the northern park gates of the park named Pike Lake. The Pike Lake community includes a school and a recreation centre. Other nearby communities include Delisle and Vanscoy.

== Recreation and amenities ==
The park includes a campground with 222 campsites, a pool and waterpark, beach, a large picnic area and grassy field, a nature trail system, miniature golf course, a snack bar / convenience store, cabins, tennis, volleyball, and a small golf course, all located on the west shore of the lake. Due to its proximity to Saskatoon, it is a popular destination for school trips and weekend campers. The park's 1.5-km nature trail begins at the interpretive centre and provides a great opportunity to experience the diverse wildlife and ecosystems contained within the park. Part of the trail is an observation deck that juts out into the lake. The waterpark is open from early June to Labour Day.

== Gallery ==
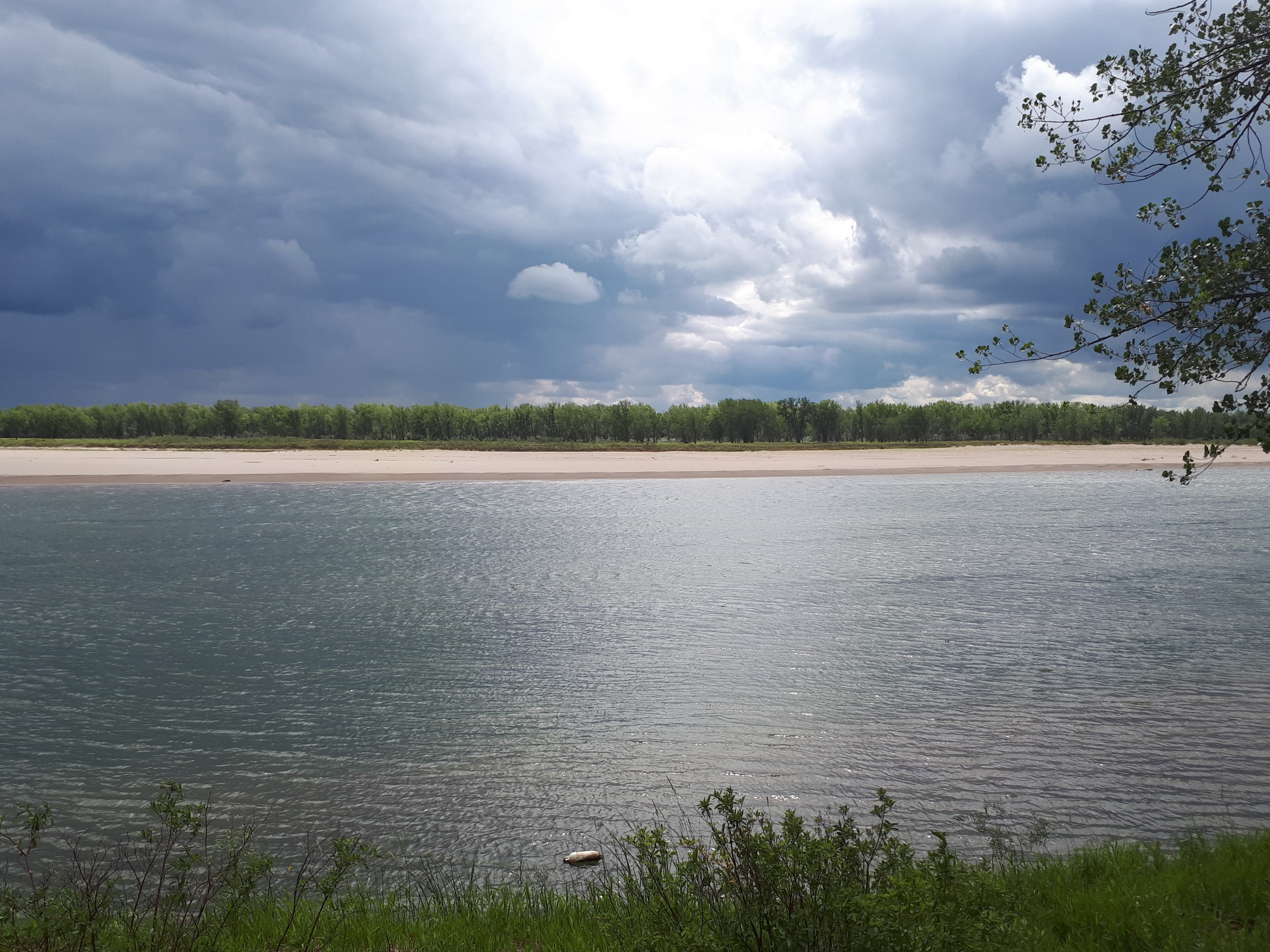
Pike Lake, viewed from Pike Lake Provincial Park

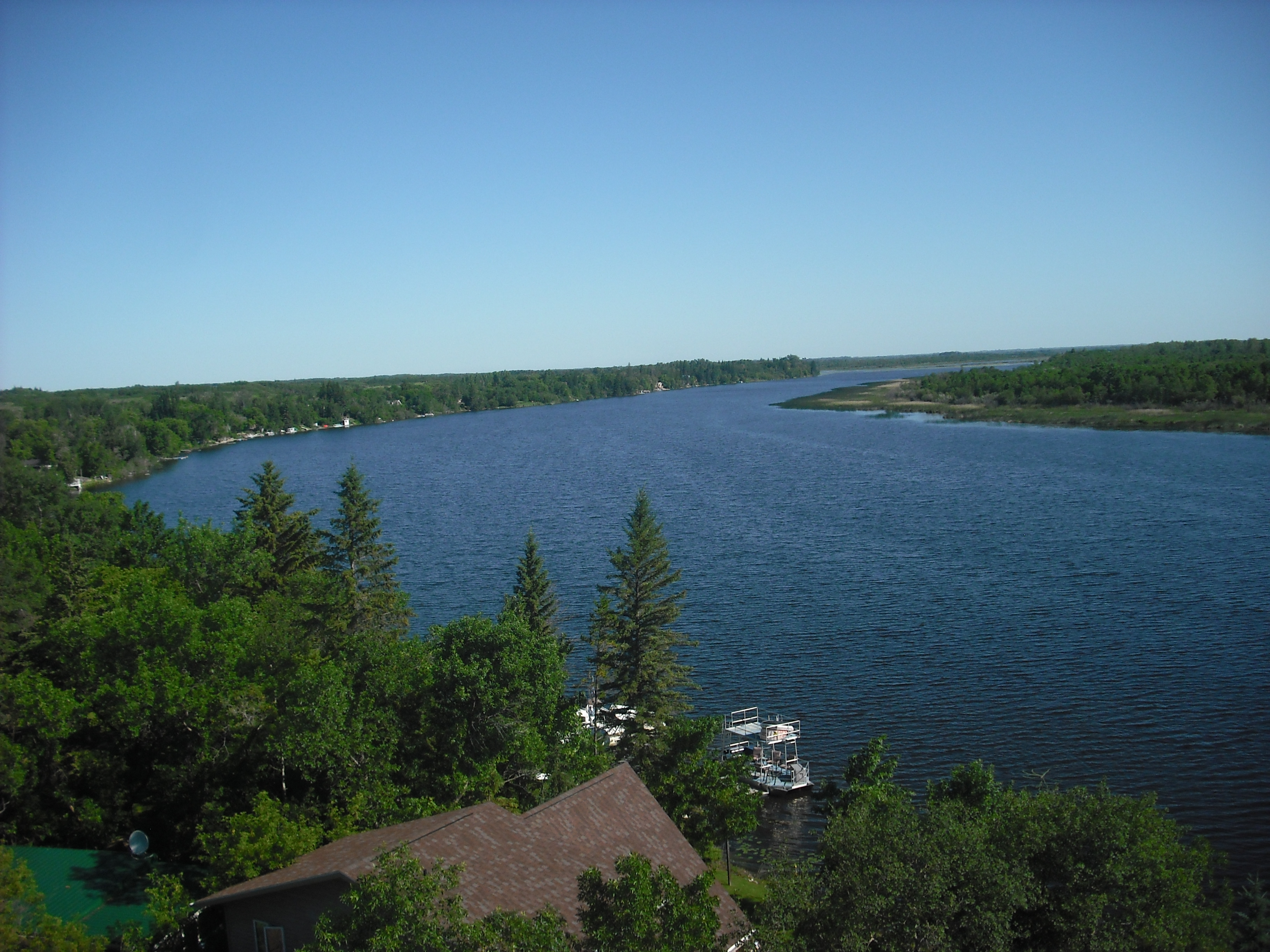
Pike Lake

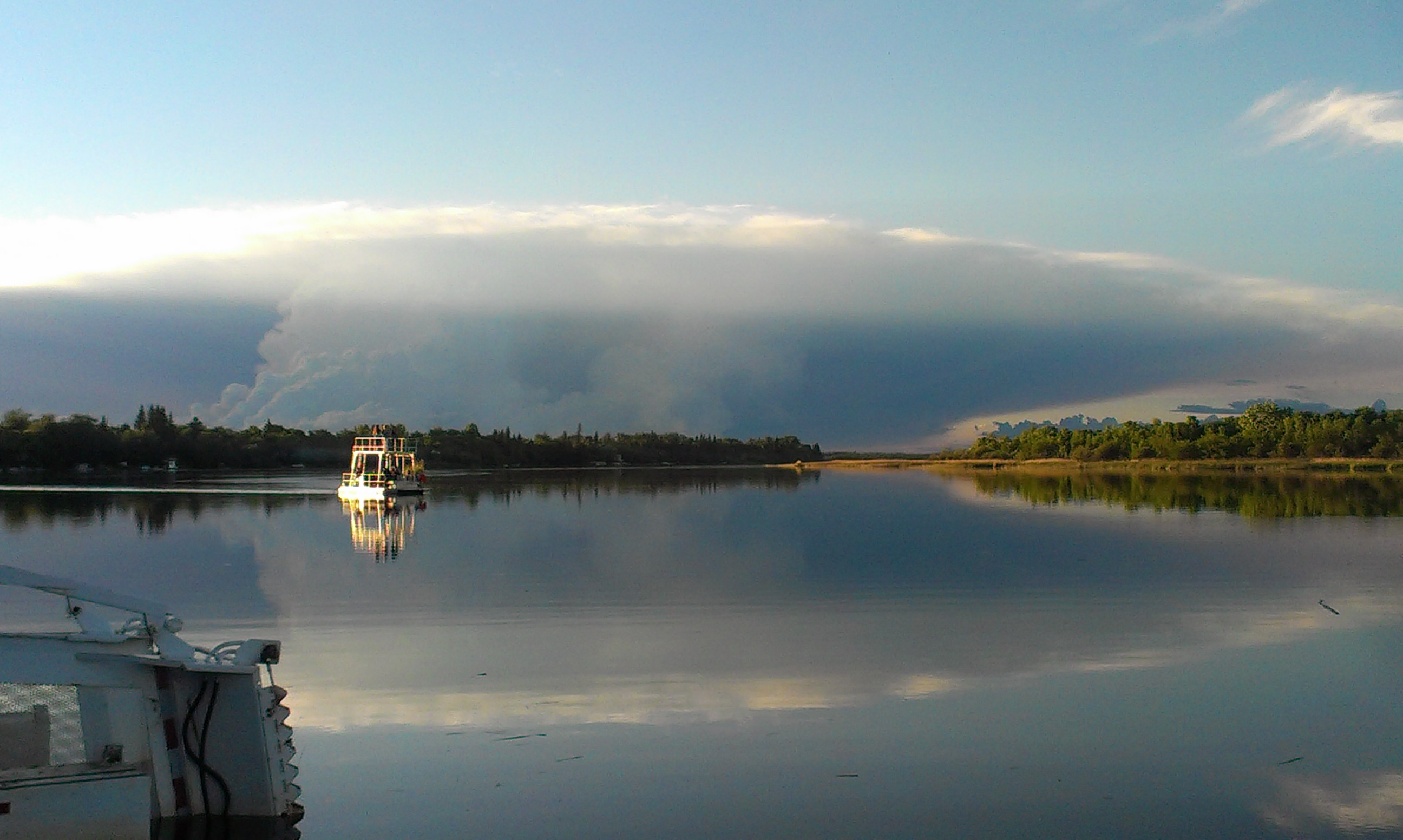
Pike Lake Looking North

== See also ==
- List of protected areas of Saskatchewan
- Tourism in Saskatchewan
