= Vanscoy, Saskatchewan =

Village in Saskatchewan, Canada

Vanscoy
- Village
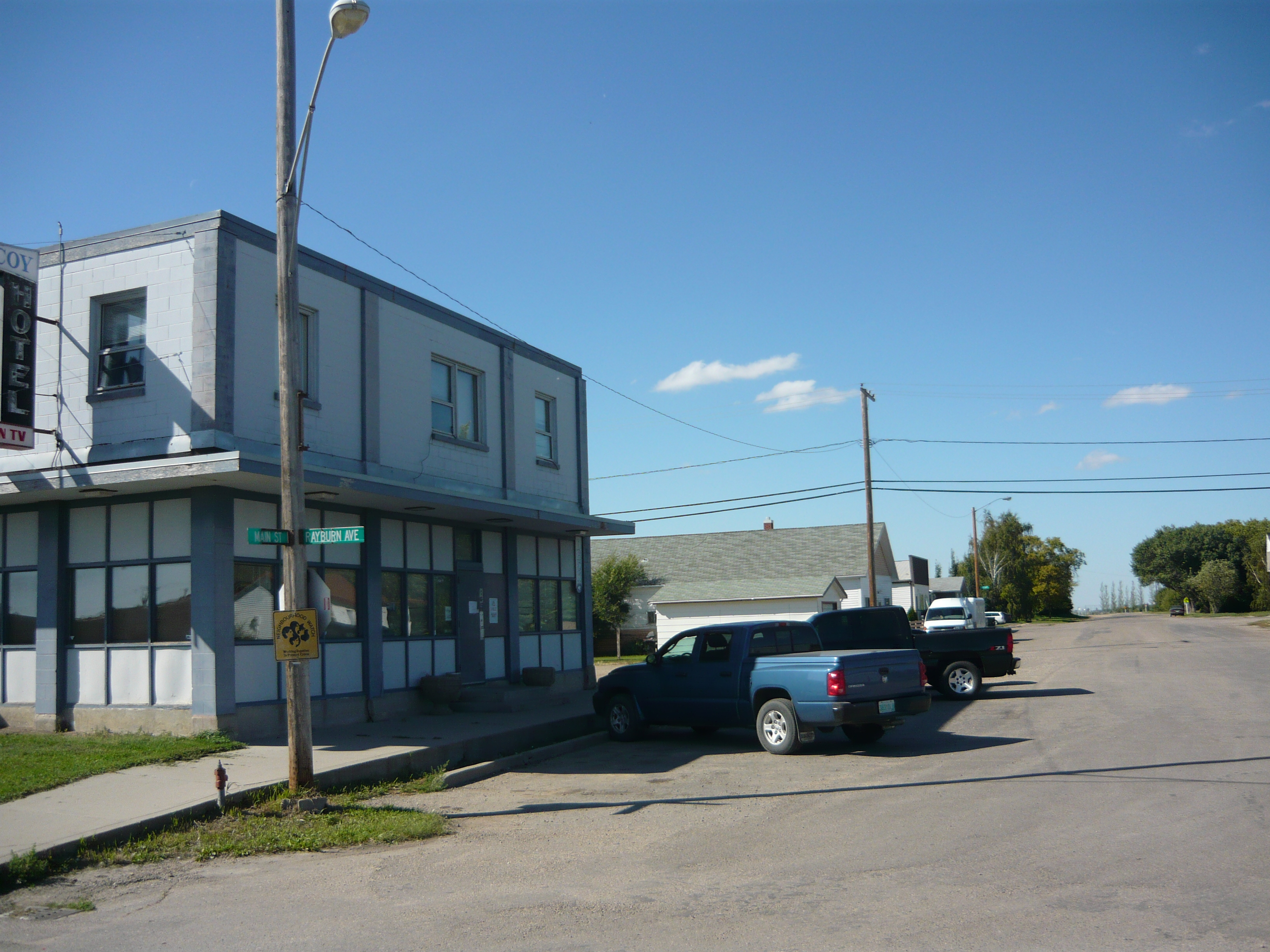
- Main Street in Vanscoy
- Interactive map of Vanscoy
- Coordinates: 52°00′N 106°59′W
- Country: Canada
- Province: Saskatchewan
- Rural municipality: Vanscoy No. 345
- Post office Founded: 1909-10-01

Government
  - Mayor: Robin Odnokon

Area
  - Land: 1.49 km^{2} (0.58 sq mi)

Population (2011)
  - Total: 377
  - Density: 253.7/km^{2} (657/sq mi)
- Time zone: UTC-6 (Central Standard Time)
- Postal code: S0L 3J0
- Area code: 306
- Highways: Highway 7
- Website: http://www.vanscoyvillage.com

Vanscoy (2016 population: 462) is a village in the Canadian province of Saskatchewan within the Rural Municipality of Vanscoy No. 345 and Census Division No. 12. Vanscoy is located on Highway 7 near Highway 762 in central Saskatchewan, 29 kilometres (18 mi) southwest of the city of Saskatoon. Rice Lake is to the west, Goose Lake is to the north, and Pike Lake and Pike Lake Provincial Park are to the east. One of the largest economic industries near Vanscoy is Agrium Vanscoy Potash Operations which produces 1,790,000 metric tonnes of potash a year. Community facilities include a circle hall, ice rink, curling rink, and ball diamond.

Highway 7 formerly passed through the townsite, but in 2019 it was rerouted to the north, bypassing the village. The 12-kilometre (7.5 mi) long bypass is part of the 31-kilometre (19 mi) long section of the twinned highway between Delisle and Saskatoon.

== History ==
Vanscoy incorporated into a village on June 17, 1919.

== Demographics ==
Population history (1981–2016)
Year	Pop.	±%
1981	298	—
1986	322	+8.1%
1991	331	+2.8%
1996	316	−4.5%
2001	345	+9.2%
2006	339	−1.7%
2011	377	+11.2%
2016	462	+22.5%
Source: Statistics Canada via Saskatchewan Bureau of Statistics

In the 2021 Census of Population conducted by Statistics Canada, Vanscoy had a population of 477 living in 193 of its 206 total private dwellings, a change of 3.2% from its 2016 population of 462. With a land area of 2.47 km^{2} (0.95 sq mi), it had a population density of 193.1/km^{2} (500.2/sq mi) in 2021.

In the 2016 Census of Population, the Village of Vanscoy recorded a population of 462 living in 191 of its 198 total private dwellings, a 18.4% change from its 2011 population of 377. With a land area of 1.49 km^{2} (0.58 sq mi), it had a population density of 310.1/km^{2} (803.1/sq mi) in 2016.

== Attractions ==
Within 19 kilometres or 12 miles of Vanscoy is the Otapasoo Trails Recreation Site. Pike Lake Provincial Park has hiking trails, boating, and marsh land conservation area, and is located 16 kilometres or 10 miles to the southeast of Vanscoy.

== Education ==
Vanscoy School provides schooling for Kindergarten to Grade 8 within the village of Vanscoy, after which they generally go to nearby Delisle for Grades 9 to 12.

== See also ==
- List of villages in Saskatchewan
