= Hoosier, Saskatchewan =

Unincorporated hamlet in Saskatchewan, Canada

Coordinates: 51°37′36″N 109°44′14″W

Location of Hoosier in Saskatchewan

Hoosier is an unincorporated hamlet in the Rural Municipality of Antelope Park No. 322, Saskatchewan, Canada. The hamlet is approximately 40 kilometres (25 mi) north-west of the town of Kindersley at the intersection of Highway 317 and Highway 772.

The Canadian Pacific Railway played a big role in the town's economy when it was completed in 1913, in the early years of Hoosier's history. Due to the closure of a branch line in 1981, the tracks from Dodsland to Hoosier were pulled and the last of the community's grain elevators was demolished, causing Hoosier's population to decline.

== See also ==
- List of communities in Saskatchewan
- List of hamlets in Saskatchewan
- Hoosier United Church (historic building located in Hoosier)
