= Brock, Saskatchewan =

Village in Saskatchewan, Canada

Brock
- Village
- Village of Brock
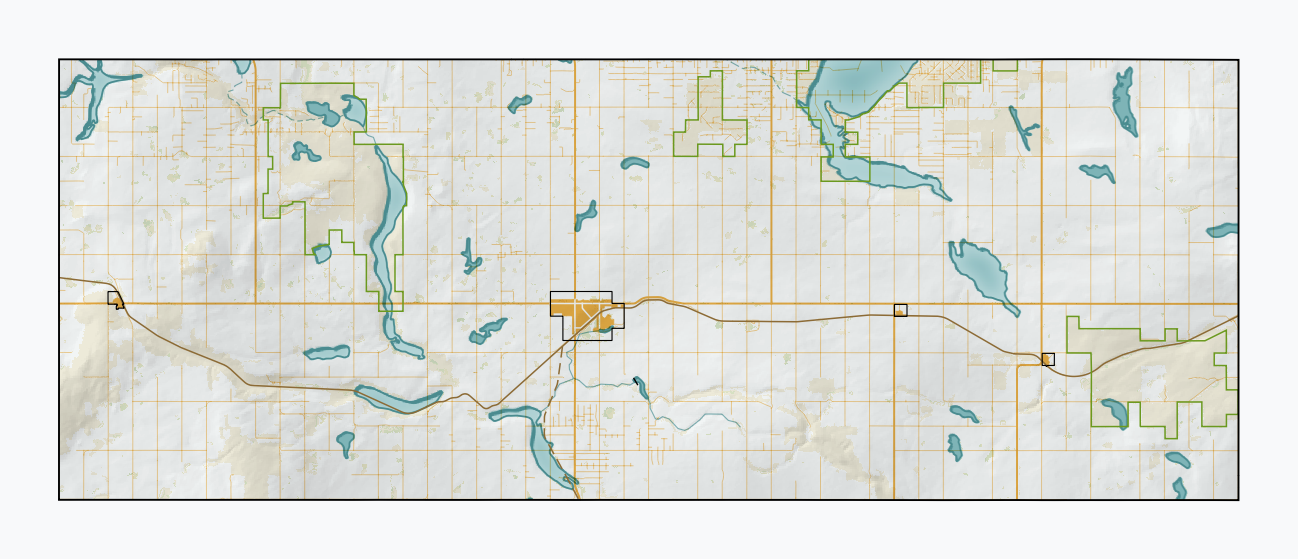
- Location within Kindersley No. 290 Location within Saskatchewan
- Coordinates: 51.441667°N 108.716944°W
- Country: Canada
- Province: Saskatchewan
- Rural municipality: Kindersley No. 290
- Post office Founded: March 1, 1910

Government
  - Type: Municipal
  - Governing body: Brock Village Council
  - Mayor: Vance Brost
  - Administrator: Charlotte Helfrich
  - MLA: Kim Gartner
  - MP: Jeremy Patzer

Area
  - Land: 0.74 km^{2} (0.29 sq mi)

Population (2016)
  - Total: 142
  - Density: 192.8/km^{2} (499/sq mi)
- Postal code: S0L 0H0
- Area code: 306
- Highways: Highway 30
- Railways: Canadian National Railway

Brock (2016 population: 142) is a village in the Canadian province of Saskatchewan within the Rural Municipality of Kindersley No. 290 and Census Division No. 13. The village is located 165 km southwest of the city of Saskatoon.

== History ==
Brock incorporated as a village on July 7, 1910. Brock was named for Isaac Brock, hero of the War of 1812.

== Demographics ==
Population history (1981–2016)
Year	Pop.	±%
1981	184	—
1986	190	+3.3%
1991	157	−17.4%
1996	142	−9.6%
2001	130	−8.5%
2006	115	−11.5%
2011	127	+10.4%
2016	142	+11.8%
Source: Statistics Canada via Saskatchewan Bureau of Statistics

In the 2021 Census of Population conducted by Statistics Canada, Brock had a population of 134 living in 62 of its 71 total private dwellings, a change of −5.6% from its 2016 population of 142. With a land area of 0.7 km^{2} (0.27 sq mi), it had a population density of 191.4/km^{2} (495.8/sq mi) in 2021.

In the 2016 Census of Population, the Village of Brock recorded a population of 142 living in 60 of its 63 total private dwellings, a 10.6% change from its 2011 population of 127. With a land area of 0.74 km^{2} (0.29 sq mi), it had a population density of 191.9/km^{2} (497.0/sq mi) in 2016.

== Notable people ==
- John Badham, sportscaster inducted into the Canadian Football Hall of Fame
- Steve MacIntyre, professional ice hockey player

== See also ==
- List of communities in Saskatchewan
- List of villages in Saskatchewan
