= Flaxcombe, Saskatchewan =

Former provincial electoral district in Newfoundland and Labrador, Canada

Flaxcombe
- Village
- Village of Flaxcombe
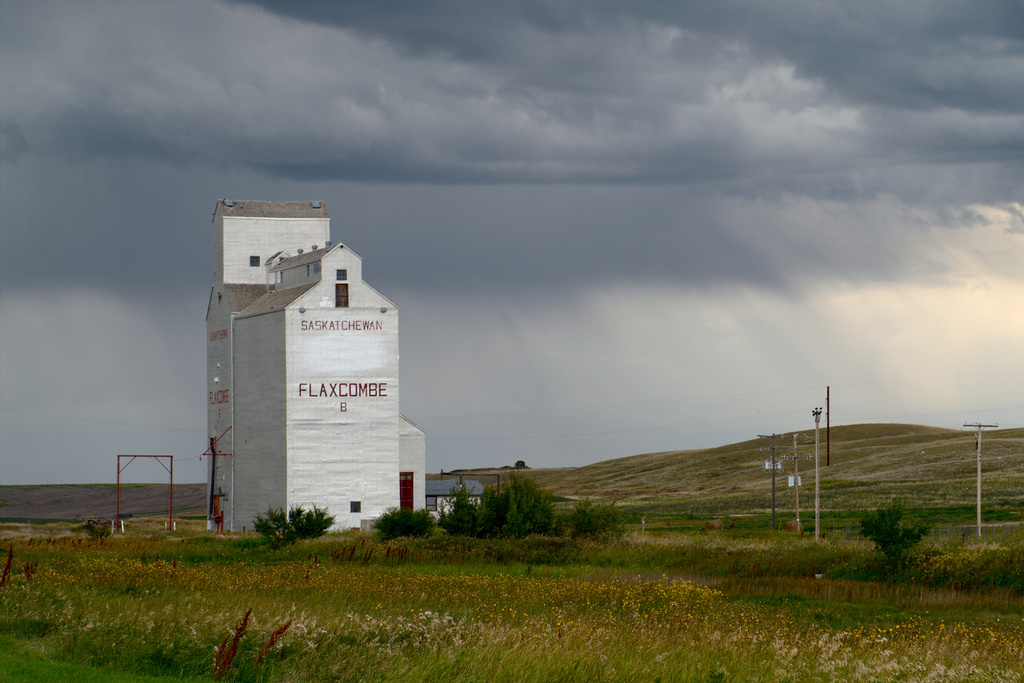

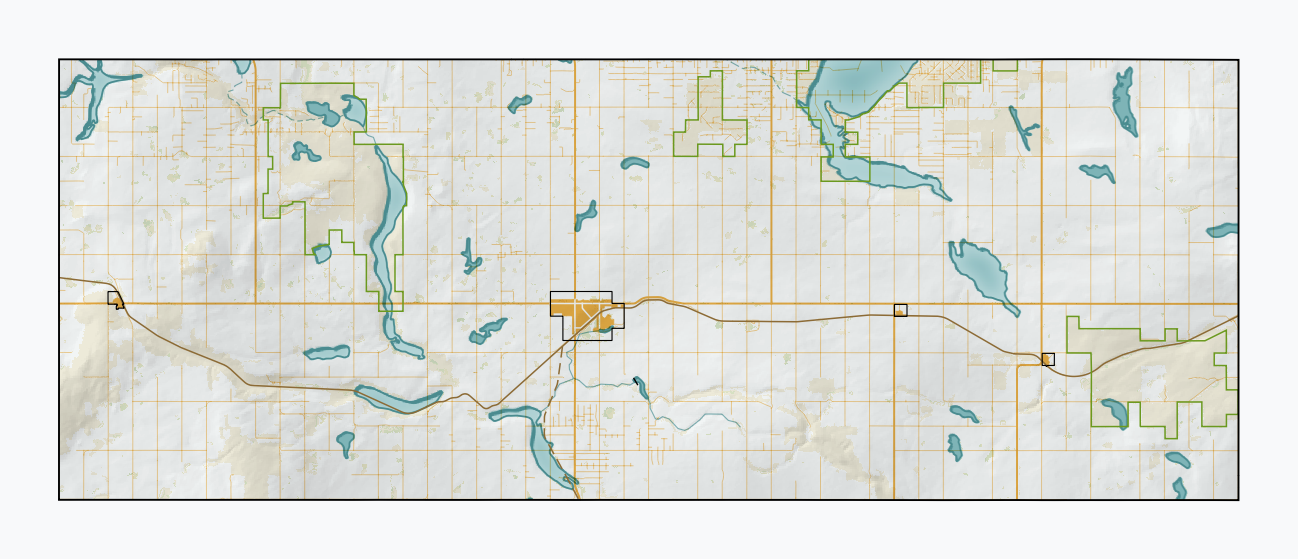
- Location within Kindersley No. 290 Location within Saskatchewan
- Coordinates: 51.459°N 109.622°W
- Country: Canada
- Province: Saskatchewan
- Rural municipality: Kindersley No. 290
- Post office founded: March 1, 1910
- Incorporated: June 4, 1913

Government
  - Type: Municipal
  - Governing body: Flaxcombe Village Council
  - Mayor: Shane Becker
  - Administrator: Charlotte Helfrich
  - MLA: Kim Gartner
  - MP: Jeremy Patzer

Area
  - Land: 1.45 km^{2} (0.56 sq mi)

Population (2021)
  - Total: 134
  - Density: 92.4/km^{2} (239/sq mi)
- Time zone: UTC-6 (CST)
- Postal code: S0L 1E0
- Area code: 306
- Highways: Highway 7
- Railways: Canadian National Railway

Flaxcombe is an incorporated village in the Canadian province of Saskatchewan within the Rural Municipality of Kindersley No. 290 and Census Division No. 13. The village is located approximately 30 kilometres (19 mi) west of the town of Kindersley, on Highway 7, and approximately 27 kilometres (17 mi) east of the Alberta–Saskatchewan border.

== History ==
Flaxcombe incorporated as a village on June 4, 1913.

== Demographics ==
In the 2021 Census of Population conducted by Statistics Canada, Flaxcombe had a population of 134 living in 55 of its 59 total private dwellings, a change of 8.1% from its 2016 population of 124. With a land area of 1.45 km^{2} (0.56 sq mi), it had a population density of 92.4/km^{2} (239.4/sq mi) in 2021.

In the 2016 Census of Population, the Village of Flaxcombe recorded a population of 124 living in 50 of its 51 total private dwellings, a 5.6% change from its 2011 population of 117. With a land area of 1.49 km^{2} (0.58 sq mi), it had a population density of 83.2/km^{2} (215.5/sq mi) in 2016.

Historical census populations – Flaxcombe, Saskatchewan

Year	Pop.	±%
1981	90	—
1986	154	+71.1%
1991	123	−20.1%
1996	126	+2.4%
2001	128	+1.6%

Year	Pop.	±%
2006	111	−13.3%
2011	117	+5.4%
2016	124	+6.0%
2021	134	+8.1%

Source: Statistics Canada via Saskatchewan Bureau of Statistics

== See also ==
- List of communities in Saskatchewan
- List of villages in Saskatchewan
