= Rural Municipality of Vanscoy No. 345 =

Rural municipality in Saskatchewan, Canada

Vanscoy No. 345 Richland No. 345 (1909) Loganton No. 345 (1909–1934)
- Rural municipality
- Rural Municipality of Vanscoy No. 345
- Location of the RM of Vanscoy No. 345 in Saskatchewan
- Coordinates: 51.946°N 106.853°W
- Country: Canada
- Province: Saskatchewan
- Census division: 12
- SARM division: 5
- Formed: December 13, 1909
- Name change: October 16, 1909 (from RM of Richland No. 345)
- Name change: April 16, 1934 (from RM of Loganton No. 345)

Government
  - Reeve: Floyd Chapple
  - Governing body: RM of Vanscoy No. 345 Council
  - Administrator: Tony Obrigewitch
  - Office location: Vanscoy

Area (2016)
  - Land: 865.49 km^{2} (334.17 sq mi)

Population (2016)
  - Total: 2,840
  - Density: 3.3/km^{2} (8.5/sq mi)
- Time zone: CST
  - Summer (DST): CST
- Area codes: 306 and 639

The Rural Municipality of Vanscoy No. 345 (2016 population: 2,840) is a rural municipality (RM) in the Canadian province of Saskatchewan within Census Division No. 12 and SARM Division No. 5. Located in the central portion of the province, it is southwest of the city of Saskatoon.

== History ==
The RM of Richland No. 345 was originally incorporated as a rural municipality on December 13, 1909. Its name was changed to the RM of Loganton No. 345 on October 16, 1909 and then renamed again to the RM of Vanscoy No. 345 on April 16, 1934.

== Geography ==
The boundaries of the RM of Vanscoy No. 345 extend to the north and northwest by the RM of Corman Park No. 344, to the west side of the South Saskatchewan River, to the south by the RM of Montrose No. 315, and to the west by the RM of Perdue No. 346. To the north used to be the RM of Park No. 375, which was disorganised on December 31, 1969 and assumed by the RM of Corman Park No. 344.

=== Communities and localities ===
The following urban municipalities are surrounded by the RM.

Towns

- Asquith
- Delisle

Villages

- Vanscoy
- Grandora

The following unincorporated communities are within the RM.

Localities

- Asquith Station
- Dunfermline
- Hawoods
- Pipin
- Vade

== Demographics ==
Population history (1981–2016)
Year	Pop.	±%
1981	1,959	—
1986	2,215	+13.1%
1991	2,308	+4.2%
1996	2,423	+5.0%
2001	2,617	+8.0%
2006	2,629	+0.5%
2011	2,714	+3.2%
2016	2,840	+4.6%
Source: Statistics Canada via Saskatchewan Bureau of Statistics

In the 2021 Census of Population conducted by Statistics Canada, the RM of Vanscoy No. 345 had a population of 2,799 living in 1,120 of its 1,259 total private dwellings, a change of −1.4% from its 2016 population of 2,840. With a land area of 861.1 km^{2} (332.5 sq mi), it had a population density of 3.3/km^{2} (8.4/sq mi) in 2021.

In the 2016 Census of Population, the RM of Vanscoy No. 345 recorded a population of 2,840 living in 1,094 of its 1,221 total private dwellings, a 4.6% change from its 2011 population of 2,714. With a land area of 865.49 km^{2} (334.17 sq mi), it had a population density of 3.3/km^{2} (8.5/sq mi) in 2016.

== Government ==
The RM of Vanscoy No. 345 is governed by an elected municipal council and an appointed administrator that meets on the second Tuesday of every month. The reeve of the RM is Floyd Chapple while its administrator is Tony Obrigewitch. The RM's office is located in Vanscoy.

Vanscoy is served by the Vanscoy Police Service, which consists of one officer and is in partnership with the Royal Canadian Mounted Police.

== Transportation ==
Rail

- CNR Saskatoon Calgary Branch—serves Saskatoon, Hawker, Vanscoy, Delisle, Laura, Tessier
- Delisle - Elrose Branch CNR—serves Saskatoon, Delisle Birdview, Swanson, Ardath, Conquest

Roads

- Highway 45—serves Delisle, Saskatchewan
- Highway 7—serves Delisle, Saskatchewan and Vanscoy, Saskatchewan
- Highway 673—serves Delisle, Saskatchewan
- Highway 672—serves Vanscoy, Saskatchewan
- Highway 673—serves Delisle, Saskatchewan

== See also ==
- List of rural municipalities in Saskatchewan
