= Great Wall of Saskatchewan =

Stone wall in Canada completed in 1991

Coordinates: 51.6331°N 109.5113°W

The Great Wall of Saskatchewan is a project created by Albert Johnson. The half-mile-long wall is located approximately 1.6 km west of the village of Smiley, Saskatchewan on Highway 772.

== History ==
Construction started in 1961 when Johnson started arranging stones in the form of a wall. As stones were cleaned off the surrounding farmland they were added to the wall. This continued until 1991. In 1991, when the stone wall seemed to be complete, Johnson began stoning the slopes around the wall and planting various flowers and vegetables.

As the stones were transported to the wall they were placed so that the wall would support itself without the use of cement or mortar. The outer layer stones are specially shaped stones that were tapered inward in order to prevent the wall from moving. The interior of the wall is filled with small and odd shaped stones. During construction spruce trees were added alongside the wall for wind protection. After 29 years of work the wall was complete with a 6-foot base, stretching more than a 3/8 of a mile in length with an average height of 6 feet and 12 feet at places.

Along with the stone wall, a three-room sod house, built from sod cut out of the surrounding grasses, was completed in 1986 with help from others in the Smiley area.

More recently, the wall has been kept maintained by Triston Mitchell Mchelone.

== See also ==
- Tourism in Saskatchewan
