= Smiley, Saskatchewan =

Village in Saskatchewan, Canada

- Village
- Location of Smiley in Saskatchewan Smiley, Saskatchewan (Canada)
- Coordinates: 51.3803°N 109.2813°W
- Country: Canada
- Province: Saskatchewan
- Region: West-central
- Census division: 13
- Rural municipality: Prairiedale No. 321 Website - www.major.ca

Government
  - Governing body: Smiley Village Council

Area
  - Total: 0.64 km^{2} (0.25 sq mi)

Population (2021)
  - Total: 25
  - Density: 39.1/km^{2} (101/sq mi)
- Time zone: CST
- Postal code: S0L 2Z0
- Area code: 306
- Highways: Highway 51
- Railway: Canadian National Railway - Transferred to Canadian Pacific Railway - Abandoned 1997

Smiley (2016 population: 60) is a village in the Canadian province of Saskatchewan within the Rural Municipality of Prairiedale No. 321 and Census Division No. 13. The village is located approximately 20 kilometres (12 mi) northwest of the town of Kindersley at the intersection of Highway 307 and Highway 772. The Grand Trunk Pacific Railway was completed in 1913, bringing an economic boom to the village's early years. On April 26, 1987 the Dodsland subdivision between Dodsland and Smiley was transferred to the Canadian Pacific Railway. Due to the close proximity to major grain centres such as Kindersley, CPR put the line up for abandonment and was granted permission to remove the track by the Canadian Transportation Agency on October 29, 1997.

An F3 tornado struck here leaving a 10-kilometre path and taking two unknown lives on July 6, 1935.

== History ==
Smiley incorporated as a village on November 26, 1913.

== Demographics ==
Population history (1971–2021)
Year	Pop.	±%
1971	126	—
1976	111	−11.9%
1981	97	−12.6%
1986	149	+53.6%
1991	71	−52.3%
1996	68	−4.2%
2001	55	−19.1%
2006	50	−9.1%
2011	60	+20.0%
2016	60	+0.0%
2021	25	−58.3%
Source: Statistics Canada via Saskatchewan Bureau of Statistics

In the 2021 Census of Population conducted by Statistics Canada, Smiley had a population of 25 living in 13 of its 17 total private dwellings, a change of −58.3% from its 2016 population of 60. With a land area of 0.62 km^{2} (0.24 sq mi), it had a population density of 40.3/km^{2} (104.4/sq mi) in 2021.

In the 2016 Census of Population, the village of Smiley recorded a population of 60 living in 26 of its 37 total private dwellings, a 0% change from its 2011 population of 60. With a land area of 0.64 km^{2} (0.25 sq mi), it had a population density of 93.8/km^{2} (242.8/sq mi) in 2016.

== Attractions ==
- Great Wall of Saskatchewan, a 1.6-kilometre-long (0.99 mi), three-metre-wide (9.8 ft), two-metre-high (6.6 ft) wall that took over 30 years to construct by Albert “Stonewall” Johnson. The wall is made entirely of stones without the use of cement or mortar, for aesthetic purposes.

== See also ==
- List of communities in Saskatchewan
- List of hamlets in Saskatchewan
