= Rural Municipality of Kindersley No. 290 =

Rural municipality in Saskatchewan, Canada

Kindersley No. 290
- Rural municipality
- Rural Municipality of Kindersley No. 290
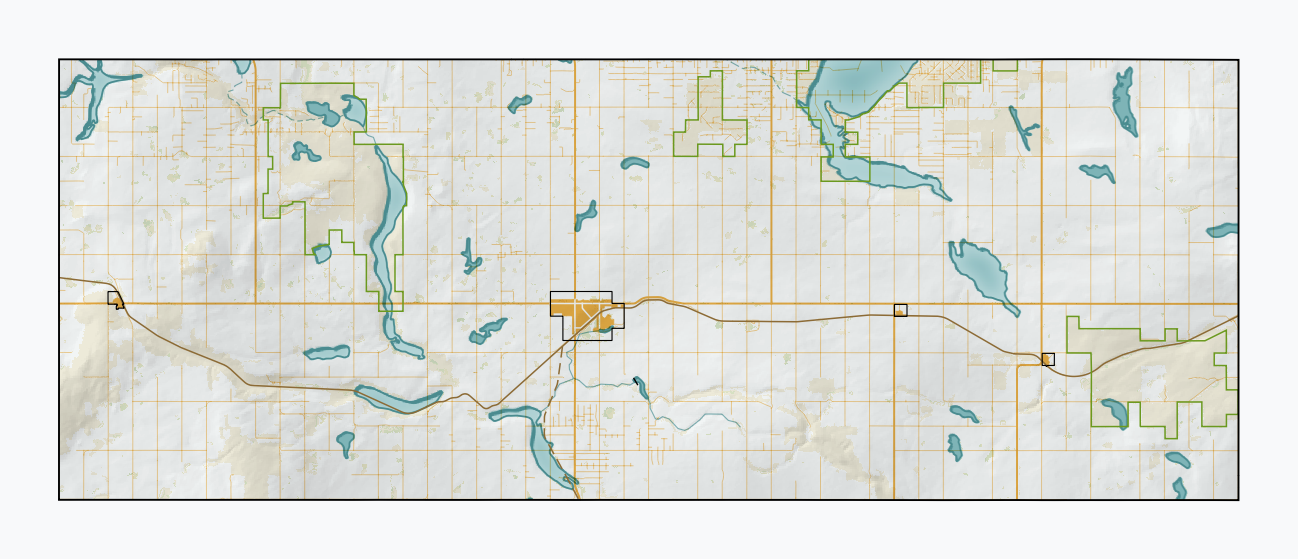

- Location of the RM of Kindersley No. 290 in Saskatchewan
- Coordinates: 51.509°N 109.143°W
- Country: Canada
- Province: Saskatchewan
- Census division: 13
- SARM division: 6
- Formed: December 12, 1910

Government
  - Reeve: Glen Harrison
  - Governing body: RM of Kindersley No. 290 Council
  - Administrator: Glenda M. Giles
  - Office location: Kindersley

Area (2016)
  - Land: 2,112.68 km^{2} (815.71 sq mi)

Population (2016)
  - Total: 1,049
  - Density: 0.5/km^{2} (1.3/sq mi)
- Time zone: CST
  - Summer (DST): CST
- Area codes: 306 and 639

The Rural Municipality of Kindersley No. 290 (2021 population: 1,003) is a rural municipality (RM) in the Canadian province of Saskatchewan within Census Division No. 13 and SARM Division No. 6. It is located in the west-central portion of the province.

== History ==
The RM of Kindersley No. 290 incorporated as a rural municipality on December 12, 1910.

== Geography ==
There are several small lakes and steams in the RM. The Teo Lakes in the Verendrye channel are at the centre the Kindersley-Elma (SK 048) Important Bird Area (IBA) of Canada. The IBA covers an area of 285.04 km^{2} (110.05 sq mi) and is important habitat for birds such as the mallard, green-winged teal, ruddy duck, ferruginous hawk, Swainson's hawk, and the burrowing owl. Over 15,000 geese and 10,000 ducks use the Teo Lakes and surrounding area during the fall migration.

=== Communities and localities ===
The following urban municipalities are surrounded by the RM.

Towns

- Kindersley

Villages

- Brock
- Flaxcombe
- Netherhill

The following unincorporated communities are located in the RM.

Localities

- Fairmount
- Pinkham
- Verendrye

== Demographics ==
Population history (1981–2016)
Year	Pop.	±%
1981	1,204	—
1986	1,230	+2.2%
1991	1,083	−12.0%
1996	1,188	+9.7%
2001	1,138	−4.2%
2006	1,042	−8.4%
2011	987	−5.3%
2016	1,049	+6.3%
Source: Statistics Canada via Saskatchewan Bureau of Statistics

In the 2021 Census of Population conducted by Statistics Canada, the RM of Kindersley No. 290 had a population of 1,003 living in 348 of its 412 total private dwellings, a change of −4.4% from its 2016 population of 1,049. With a land area of 2,164.53 km^{2} (835.73 sq mi), it had a population density of 0.5/km^{2} (1.2/sq mi) in 2021.

In the 2016 Census of Population, the RM of Kindersley No. 290 recorded a population of 1,049 living in 354 of its 401 total private dwellings, a 6.3% change from its 2011 population of 987. With a land area of 2,112.68 km^{2} (815.71 sq mi), it had a population density of 0.5/km^{2} (1.3/sq mi) in 2016.

== Government ==
The RM of Kindersley No. 290 is governed by an elected municipal council and an appointed administrator that meets on the second Tuesday of every month. The reeve of the RM is Lionel Story while its administrator is Glenda M. Giles. The RM's office is located in Kindersley.
