= Herschel, Saskatchewan =

Community in Saskatchewan, Canada

Herschel
- Special service area
- Special Service Area of Herschel
- The Herschel Museum, located in a former church

- Location of Herschel in Saskatchewan Herschel (Canada)
- Coordinates: 51.655°N 108.423°W
- Country: Canada
- Province: Saskatchewan
- Census division: 12
- Rural Municipality: Mountain View
- Post office founded: 1911
- Incorporated (Village): 1910
- Incorporated (Town): N/A

Area
  - Total: 1.35 km^{2} (0.52 sq mi)

Population (2016)
  - Total: 30
  - Density: 22.2/km^{2} (57/sq mi)
- Time zone: CST
- Postal code: S0L 1L0
- Area code: 306
- Highways: Highway 31; Highway 656
- Railways: Canadian Pacific Railway
- Waterways: Eagle Creek

Herschel is a special service area in the Canadian province of Saskatchewan. It is the seat of the Rural Municipality of Mountain View No. 318 and held village status prior to December 31, 2006. The population was 30 people in 2016. The community is located 37 km northwest of the town of Rosetown at the intersection of Highway 31 and Highway 656, along a now abandoned section of the Kerrobert-Rosetown Canadian Pacific Railway line. Herschel is the home of the Ancient Echoes Interpretive Centre.

== Demographics ==
In the 2021 Census of Population conducted by Statistics Canada, Herschel had a population of 30 living in 14 of its 21 total private dwellings, a change of 0% from its 2016 population of 30. With a land area of 1.28 km^{2} (0.49 sq mi), it had a population density of 23.4/km^{2} (60.7/sq mi) in 2021.

Canada census – Herschel, Saskatchewan community profile

	2016
Population	30 ({{{2016_pop_delta}}}% from 2011)
Land area	1.35 km^{2} (0.52 sq mi)
Population density	22.2/km^{2} (57/sq mi)
Median age
Private dwellings	19 (total)
Median household income

References: 2016

== History ==
=== Prehistoric period ===
About 65 millions of years ago, during the late Cretaceous period, Herschel was under water, part of the Western Interior Seaway, a shallow inland seaway that flowed from the Arctic Ocean to the Gulf of Mexico, splitting North America in two. During this time, the area was much warmer than it is today and was teeming with ancient marine reptiles. Herschel's location, on the edge of the seaway, resulted in some unusual fossil deposits from a time little understood in Saskatchewan's history. Perhaps most unusual is that the area contains a mixture of fossils from both the sea and dry land.

Two rare marine fossil bonebeds were discovered, as part of the Bearpaw Formation in the Coal Mine Ravine near Herschel in the 1990s. Subsequent excavations have uncovered the remains of long-neck plesiosaurs (elasmosaurs), mosasaurs, several species of shark, including the chimaera (ghost sharks), several types of bony fish and most significantly, three short-necked plesiosaurs called Dolichorhynchops herschelensis. (pronounced /ˌdɒlɪkɔːˈrɪŋkɒps ˌhɜːrʃəˈlɛnsɪs/ DOL-i-kor-ING-kops HER-shə-LEN-sis). These are the only known specimens of this species on earth. The fossils were sent to the T. Rex Discovery Centre in Eastend, to be catalogued and preserved.

Land-based dinosaur bones have also been found in the ravine and combined with a large amount of fossilized wood and amber, indicated that the area was likely very close to the shoreline of the seaway at one point.

Today, many of these fossils are on display at the Ancient Echoes Interpretive Centre in Herschel, Saskatchewan. Visitors can view a variety of paleontology, archaeology and natural history exhibits as well guided tours of the bonebeds themselves.

=== First Nations history ===
The prairie around Herschel was prime habitat for the plains bison. For thousands of years, these were the hunting grounds of several first nations tribes, including the Blackfoot, Gros Ventre and Plains Cree as well as the Métis. The Coalmine Ravine near Herschel is home to a buffalo Jump and a butchering / pemmican processing site. Artifacts have been found here that suggest the site may have been used as long ago as 12,000 years ago and right up until the 1500s.

Herschel is also home to a 1500-year-old Aboriginal ceremonial site in the Coalmine Ravine. This site, discovered in 1960 by a local farmer, includes various stone tipi rings, a medicine wheel, a possible turtle effigy and vision quest site as well as three petroglyphs. These petroglyphs are carved out of glacial erratics, remnants of the last ice age and are believed to have been religious objects. They are still used in First Nations' spiritual ceremonies today. In 1988 the site was designated a Municipal Heritage Site in the Province of Saskatchewan. Archeological excavations of the petroglyphs yielded several artifacts that suggest the continuous use of the site from approximately 600 to 1900 AD.

In the summer of 1859, James Carnegie, the 9th Earl of Southesk a renowned Scottish big-game hunter, travelled to the Herschel area. With the help of his Metis guide Napeskis (youngest brother of Ahtahkakoop / Chief Starblanket), the Earl killed several large bison and a plains grizzly, a statue of which, can be seen at the Ancient Echoes Interpretive Centre in Herschel. Some of the Earl's trophies from his trip to Canada are still on display at Kinnaird Castle in Scotland.

Today, there are exhibits related to the 9th Earl of Southesk's adventures in Herschel as well as First Nations history and the history of the bison are housed at the Ancient Echoes Interpretive Centre in Herschel, Saskatchewan. Visitors can go on guided tours of the ceremonial site in the nearby Coalmine Ravine and walk along old First Nations and early settler trails.

=== Pioneer history ===
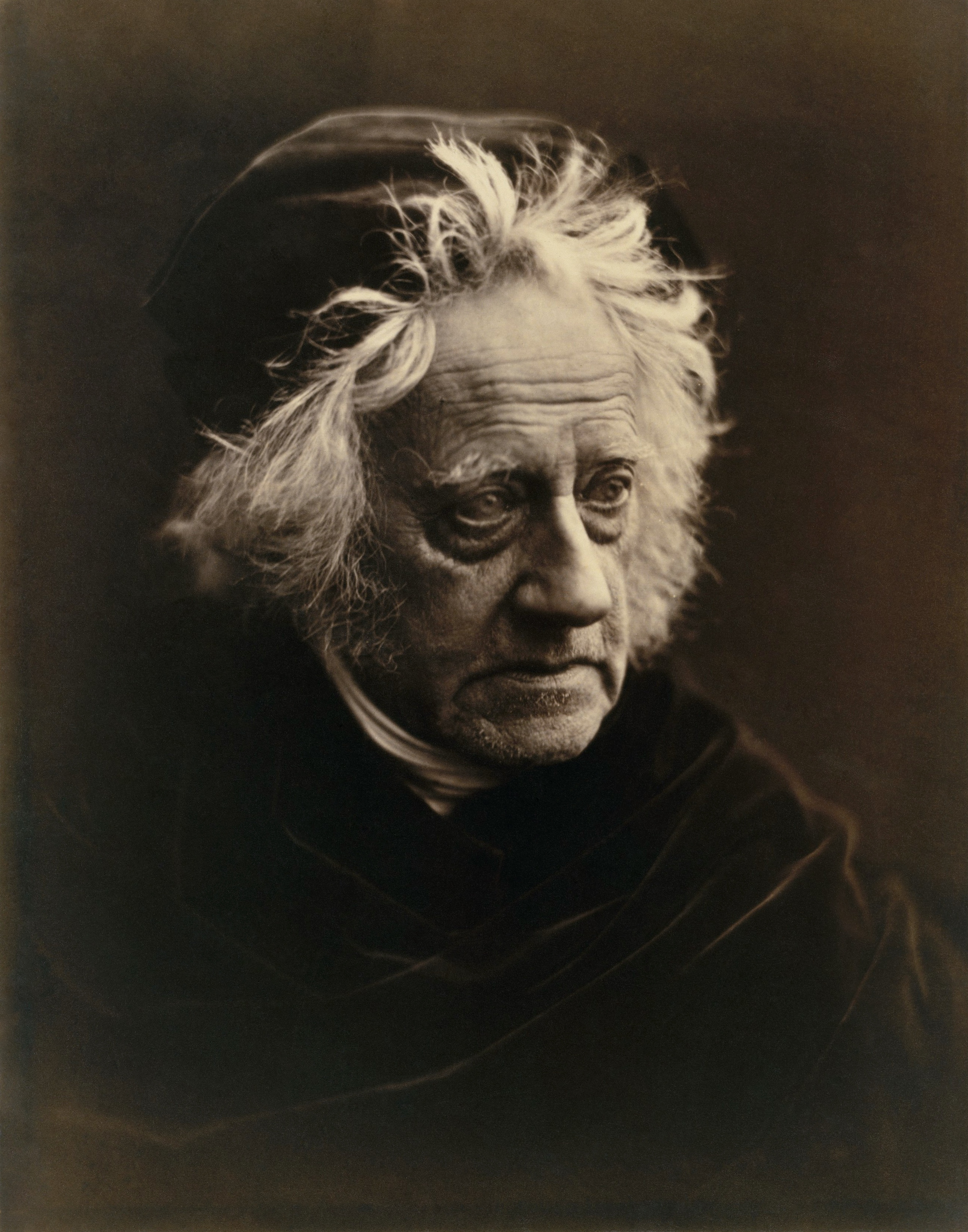
Herschel was named after British astronomer Sir John Frederick William Herschel

The fertile grassland that once supported millions of bison around Herschel, was also ideal for agriculture. The hilly areas were well suited for grazing livestock. This attracted early settlers to the region and in October 1910, the village of Herschel was established. The village was named in honour of 19th Century English physicist and astronomer Sir John Fredrick William Herschel.

1911 was a busy year for Herschel. Among the first to settle in the district was W. G. King who erected the first building in the village; a general store. In June, a post office was opened and manned by Postmaster P.R. Plisson. This was followed by the arrival of the first mixed train in August. The first baby born in Herschel was Harry Herschel Cargill, born on October 4, 1911. A month later, the rail line from Macklin to Rosetown was formally opened for traffic. The United Church was the first church building constructed at Herschel and other construction included the building of a hockey rink and the construction of the village's first grain elevator by the McLaughlin & Ellis company.

With the rapidly growing community, education became a concern and a school organization meeting was held at Herschel on October 26, 1912. The first school, a temporary one, was located in the house of Mr. Robert Day. Eventually, in 1925, $18,000 was raised and allotted for the construction of a new school. A large contingent of Mennonites from Russia arrived in the Herschel area in the winter of 1924/25 to settle and farm, forming a Bloc Settlement. They organized their congregation in 1925 as the Ebenfeld Mennonite Church, later changed to the Herschel Ebenfeld Mennonite Church in 1980.

In the 1930s soft coal began to be mined a small valley just south of Herschel, which lead to the valley being named, the Coal Mine Ravine. Today the ravine is no longer mined for coal but it is home to the Ancient Echoes Interpretive Centre, several archaeological sites, as well as being home to several endangered species of plants and the remains of a former First Nations/Metis/pioneer Red River Cart trail.

In 1935, a major fire destroyed 18 homes and businesses in Herschel. The blaze destroyed three general stores, the post office, a harness shop, the drug store, a pool hall, the Royal Hotel, a Chinese laundry, a hardware store, the municipal office, a restaurant, homes and other structures. Poor local roads were blamed for the extent of the blaze, with fire engines from Rosetown unable to reach the community for more than four hours.

=== Recent history ===
Post-war Herschel was full of optimism. The 1950s saw many new businesses open in the community and in 1956 Herschel reached its peak population of 203 people. 1950 saw a concerted community effort to build the Herschel Memorial Hall, which soon became a reality. Around the same time, a bronze plaque was purchased to honour all of those who fought and died in the Second World War while a flagpole and memorial were erected at the Herschel cemetery.

In its early days, Herschel was home to several grain elevators. Over the years, many elevators came, went or were amalgamated. In May 2010, the final two elevators in Herschel, the United Grain Growers elevator, along with the Wheat Pool elevator, were demolished. Fire once again, in a repeat of the 1935 disaster, claimed the Herschel Hotel, which burned to the ground on December 25, 1979.

1961 saw the construction of a new school in Herschel. It served the students of Herschel well over the years, however in June 1994 the Herschel kindergarten to elementary school was closed due to declining attendance. The Herschel Development Committee negotiated an agreement with the Rosetown school division to buy the school and a former teacherage, for $1.

In October of that year, the Ancient Echoes Interpretive Centre was officially established in the old school. Its mission was to celebrate and share the area's fossil treasures, unique prairie grassland ecology, rich local history and ancient First Nation's ceremonial sites and history.

The Vancouver-based backpack manufacturer Herschel Supply Co., founded by Lyndon and Jamie Cormack in 2009, adopted the name of Herschel, the town where three generations of their family grew up.

Herschel is the home of a yearly ethnic supper. This meal includes wereneki which is a Mennonite perogy and a smoked sausage. The youth of the community have been known to consume upwards of 25 wereneki during the culinary event.

== Ancient Echoes Interpretive Centre ==
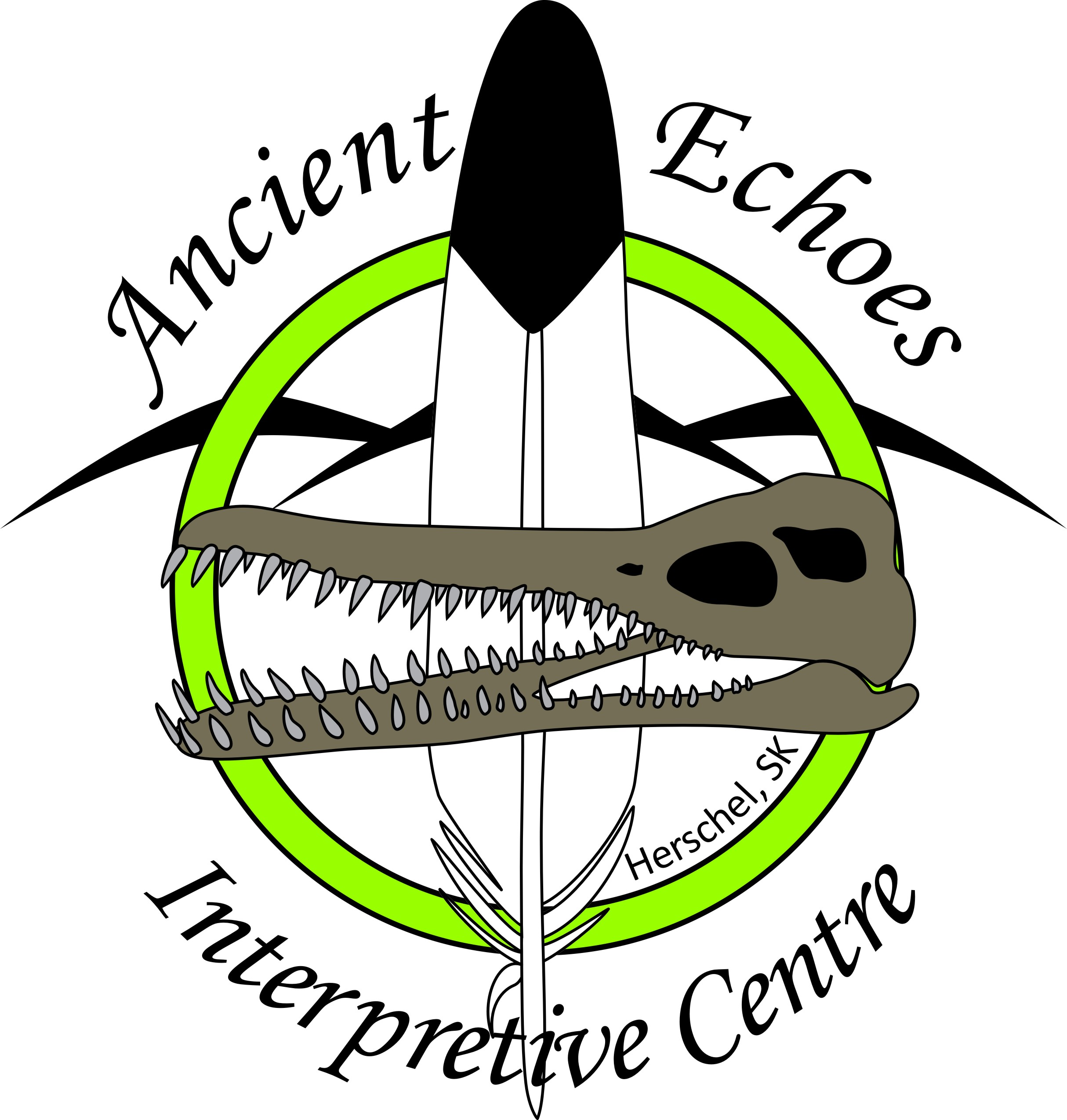
Ancient Echoes Interpretive Centre in Herschel, Saskatchewan

While preparations were being made to open the Interpretive Centre in June 1994, excavations continued in the ground around the largest of the three remaining petroglyphs in the Coalmine Ravine. Around the same time, a local taxidermist, Lyle Waddington, started donating several examples of his work to Ancient Echoes. These works reflected the natural history and local prairie wildlife and consisted of several native bird and mammal species found in the Herschel area. In October of that same year, what was called The Herschel Interpretive Centre, at that time, was officially established. It was staffed by a dedicated team of volunteers and funded by individual and corporate donations, as well as a small government grant. The Centre's mandate was to promote ecology, fossil history and the Aboriginal heritage of the area.

In the 1990s three fossilized skeletons of Dolichorhynchops herschelensis, a type of short-necked plesiosaur, were discovered in the Coalmine Ravine. During this excavation paleontologists uncovered the remains of varying marine life: two or three different shark species, numerous fish vertebrate fragments, and a mosasaur (large lizard like marine animal). Around this time, Rosetown resident and woodcarver, Jack Klemmer, visited Ancient Echoes for the first time. Since then, his carvings have been on display at the Centre and the proceed from their sale have been donated to Ancient Echoes. Also in the late 1990s, the Centre received a $5,000 donation from Enbridge Pipelines to purchase shipping carts for the Centre's displays and to help pay for the initial print run of renowned Metis artist, Jo Cooper's paintings, entitled “The Disappearance and Resurgence of the Buffalo” which was displayed for the first time at Ancient Echoes Interpretive Centre. Outside on the Ancient Echoes Interpretive Centre's grounds stands a life size statue of a plains grizzly bear, now extinct in the area, created by artist William Epp in honour of the large bear famously killed on the very spot over 100 years earlier by James Carnegie, the 9th Earl of Southesk while on an expedition to the Canadian prairies in 1859/60 .

Since that time, several paleontologists, students, and scores of volunteers have returned every summer to continue and expand the hunt for and preservation of both paleontological and archaeological specimens in the Coalmine Ravine. New fossils of several species of dinosaurs, marine reptiles, ancient sharks, shellfish, land and aquatic plants as well as many other fossil varieties are being found in the ravine all the time. The Herschel area is now considered by many to be a hot spot for archaeology, paleontology, rare and endangered native prairie plants and animals.

== Gallery ==
Images of the town of Herschel and surrounding area:

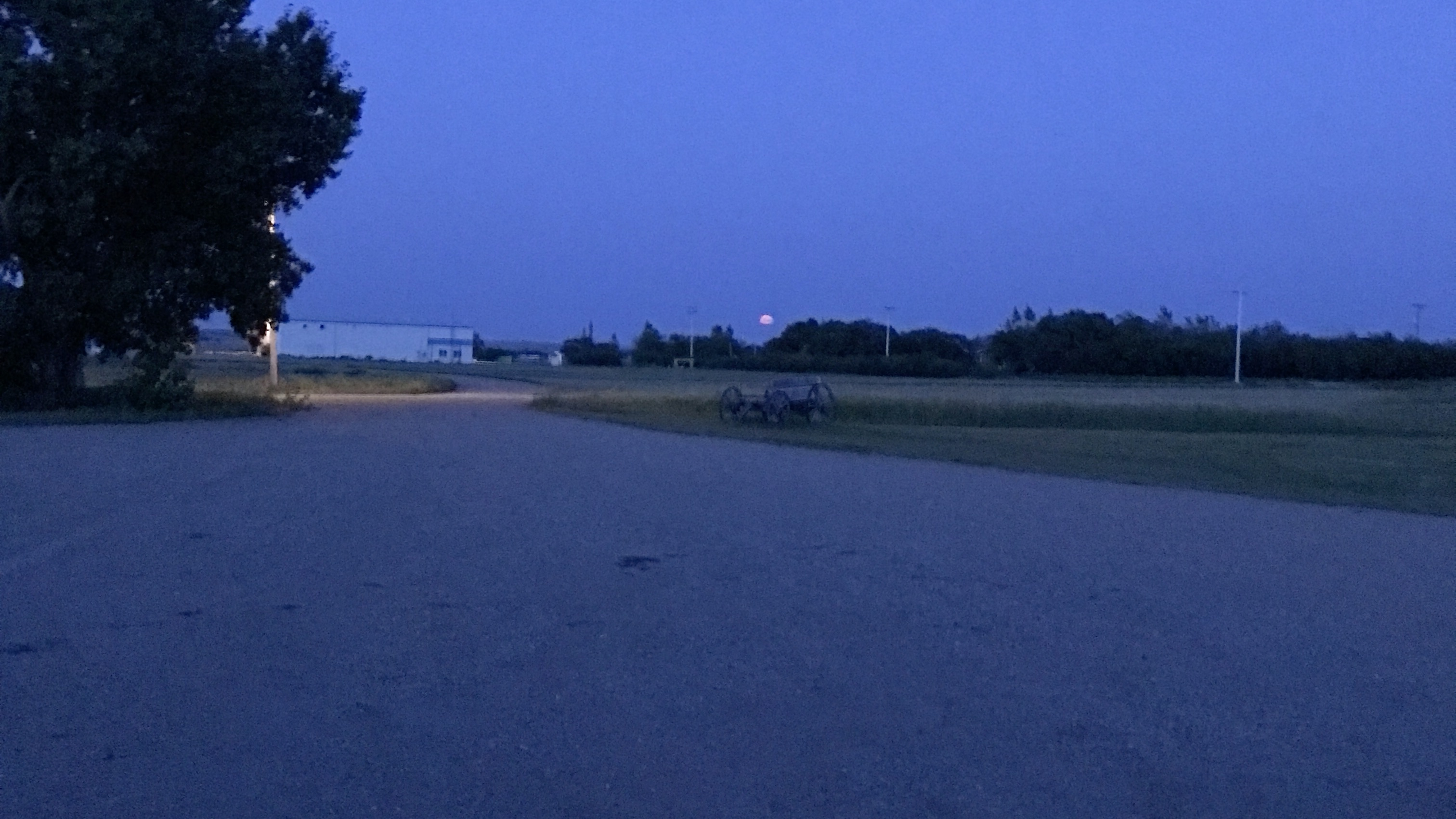
Full moon over Herschel

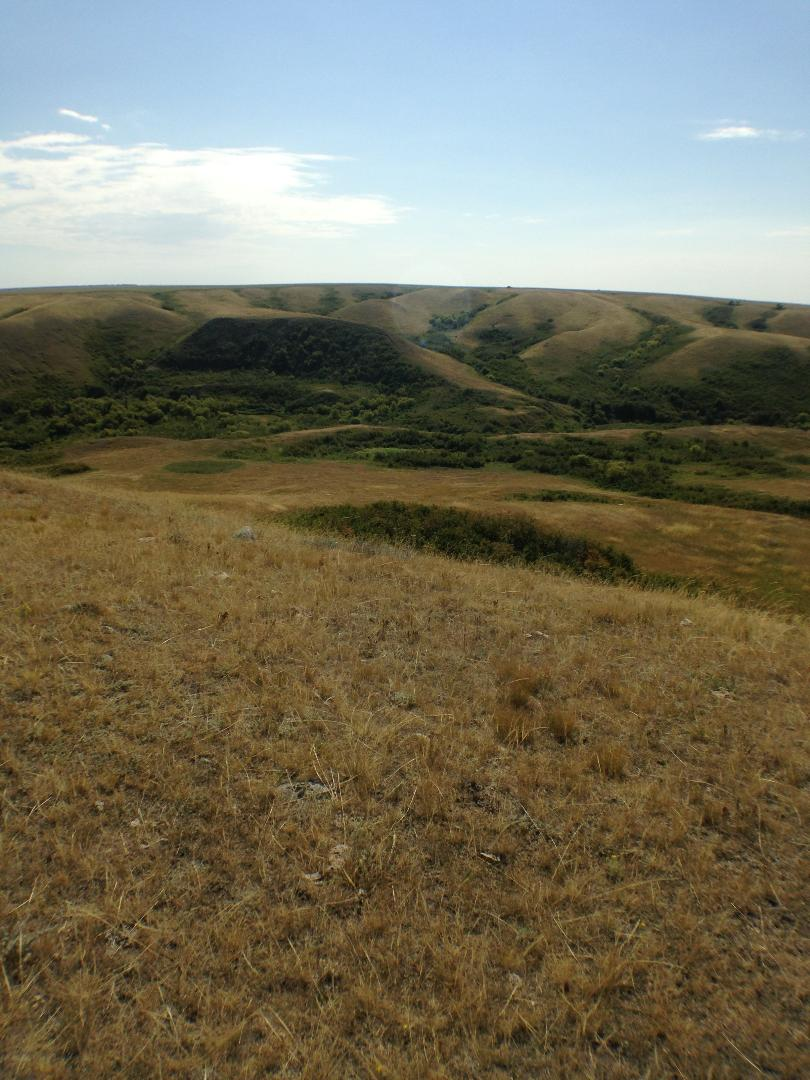
A buffalo jump and pemmican processing site in the Coalmine Ravine near Herschel

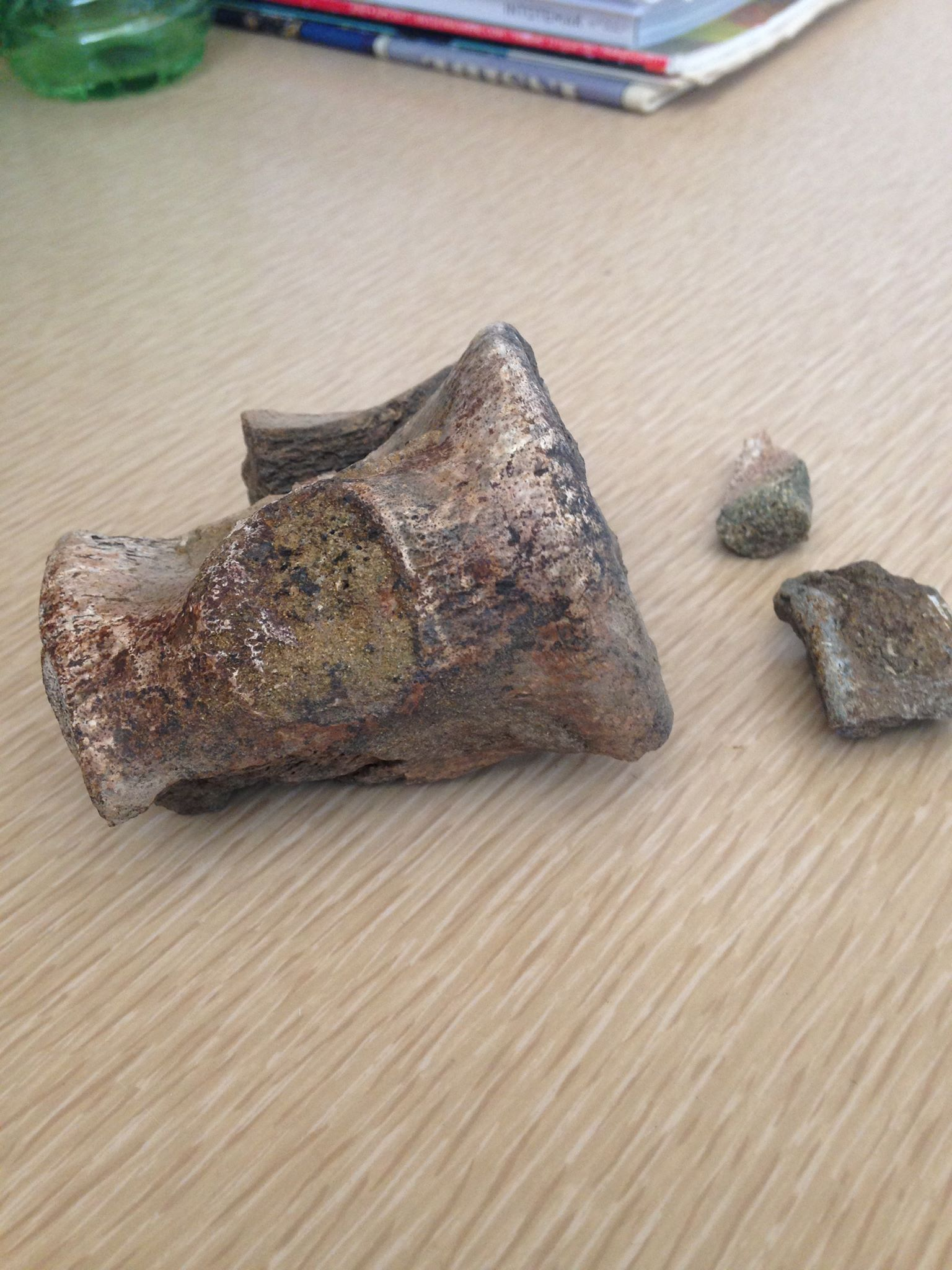
Fossilized vertebrae of a unique species of short-necked plesiosaur discovered near Herschel

== Attractions ==
The community of Herschel, the nearby Bad Hills and the Rural Municipality of Mountain View No. 318 are home to many interesting attractions and points of interest, including:

- Ancient Echoes Interpretive Centre
- Herschel Retreat House
- Herschel Memorial Hall
- Herschel Memorial Rink
- Herschel Museum
- Herschel Ebenfeld Mennonite Church
- Stranraer Commemorative Library

== See also ==
- List of communities in Saskatchewan
- List of hamlets in Saskatchewan
- List of historic places in rural municipalities of Saskatchewan
