= Stranraer, Saskatchewan =

Hamlet in Saskatchewan, Canada

Stranraer
- Unincorporated community
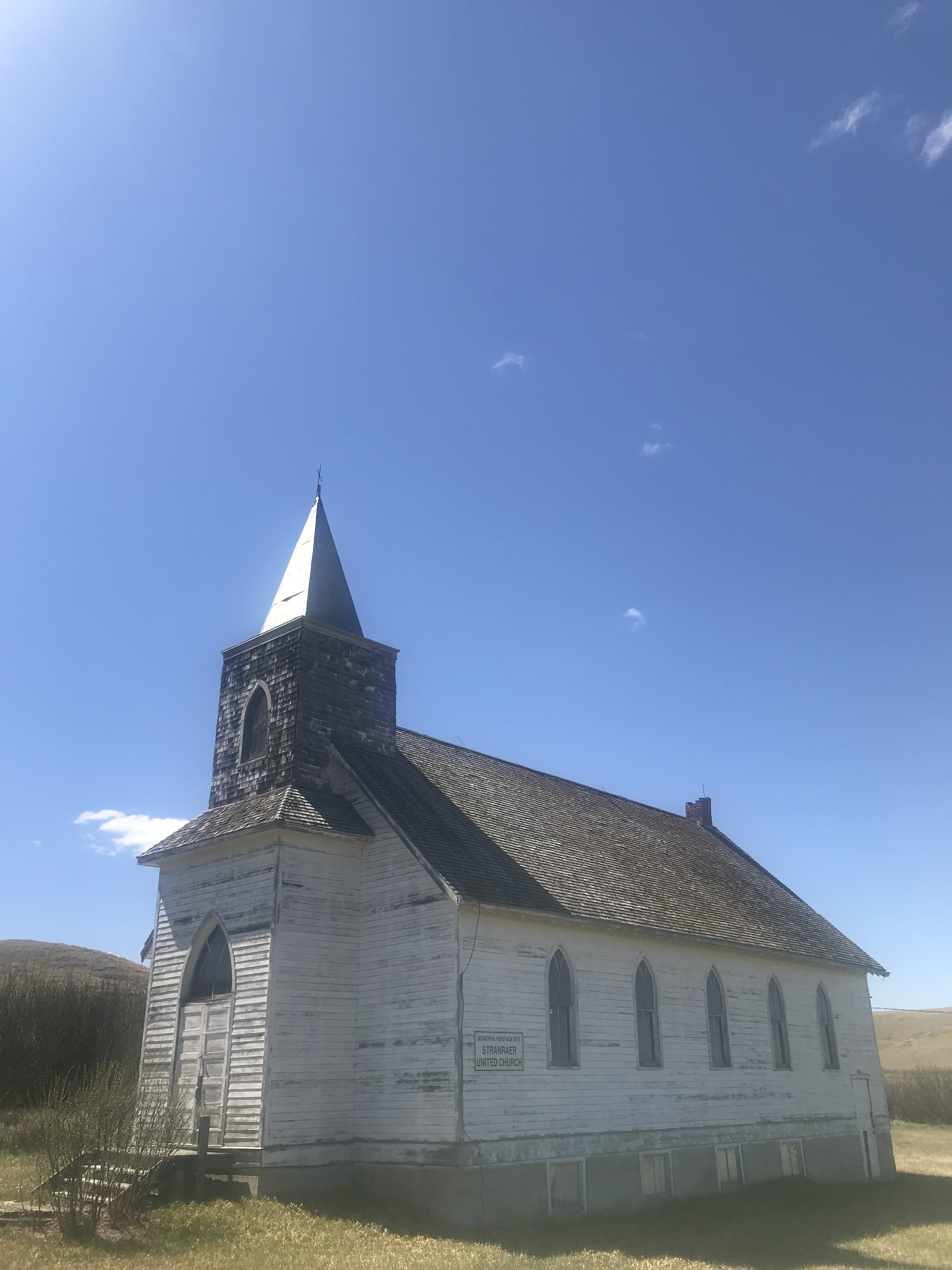
- United Church in Stranraer

- Location of Stranraer in Saskatchewan Stranraer (Canada)
- Coordinates: 51.4300°N 108.2903°W
- Country: Canada
- Province: Saskatchewan
- Census division: 12
- Rural municipality: Mountain View No. 318
- Named for: Stranraer, Scotland

Government
  - Type: Municipal

Population (2024)
  - Total: 9
- Time zone: CST
- Postal code: S0L 3B0
- Area code: (306)
- Highways: Highway 31

Stranraer is an unorganized hamlet located in the Rural Municipality of Mountain View No. 318 in Saskatchewan on Highway 31 and along a now abandoned section of the Kerrobert-Rosetown Canadian Pacific Railway line. The community is along the course of Eagle Creek.

== History ==
Stranraer is named after Stranraer, Scotland. The hamlet was given its name by the Canadian Pacific Railway. The town of Stranraer is located in the Eagle Creek Valley and was home to Twin Towers Ski Resort for thirty years, before it closed in 2009. The town had three grain elevators, a beach volleyball site and picnic grounds, a United Church, constructed between 1926 and 1929 and was designated as a Municipal Heritage site and an old school, completed in 1927, that has had the exterior restored with murals, showing Stranraer back in its heyday, covering some of its windows.

Stranraer was established in 1913, but long before the railway came through the district was served by Ferguson brothers' store. When Stranraer was officially incorporated as a village, the Fergusons built the first store. At one point Stranraer boasted four grain elevators with a total capacity of 150,000 bushels. The Stranraer School, a municipal heritage site, opened in 1927, replacing an earlier, smaller school that dated back to 1912. The new school had three teachers who taught several grades. As the local population of Stranraer shrunk, enrolment in the school declined and was officially closed in 1969. The town also has a large community hall with a hardwood dance floor. There were two general stores, a hardware store, a garage, and an implement agency with a well equipped machine shop. Stranraer still boasted three Sask Pool plants in the 1978-79 crop year, however, today, there are none remaining.

== Historic buildings ==
There are a couple historic buildings in Stranraer, including one designated as a Municipal Heritage Property:

- Stranraer School
- Stranraer United Church

== Gallery ==
Points of interest in Stranraer and area:

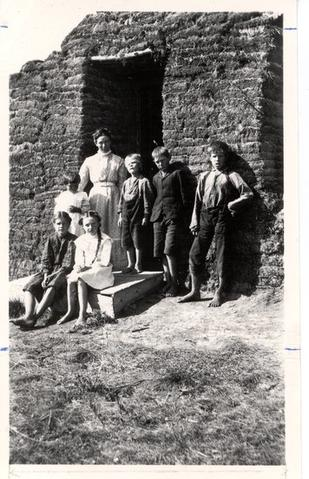
Teacher and students outside of Wynona school near Stranraer, 1909

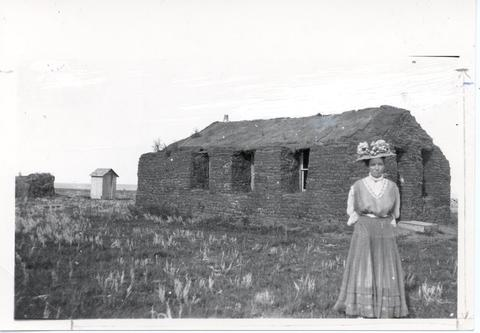
Teacher outside of Wynona school, near Stranraer, 1909

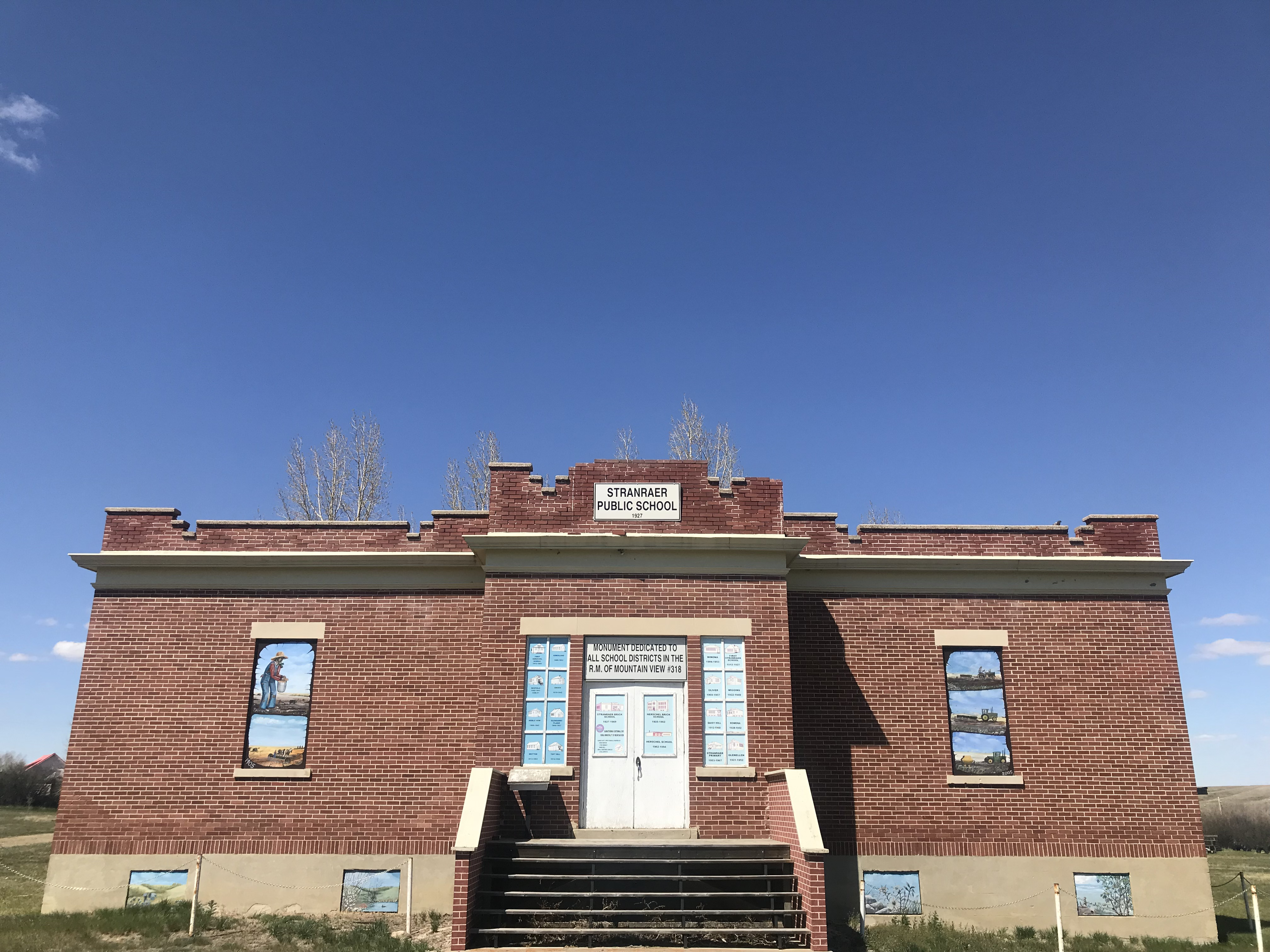
Stranraer school

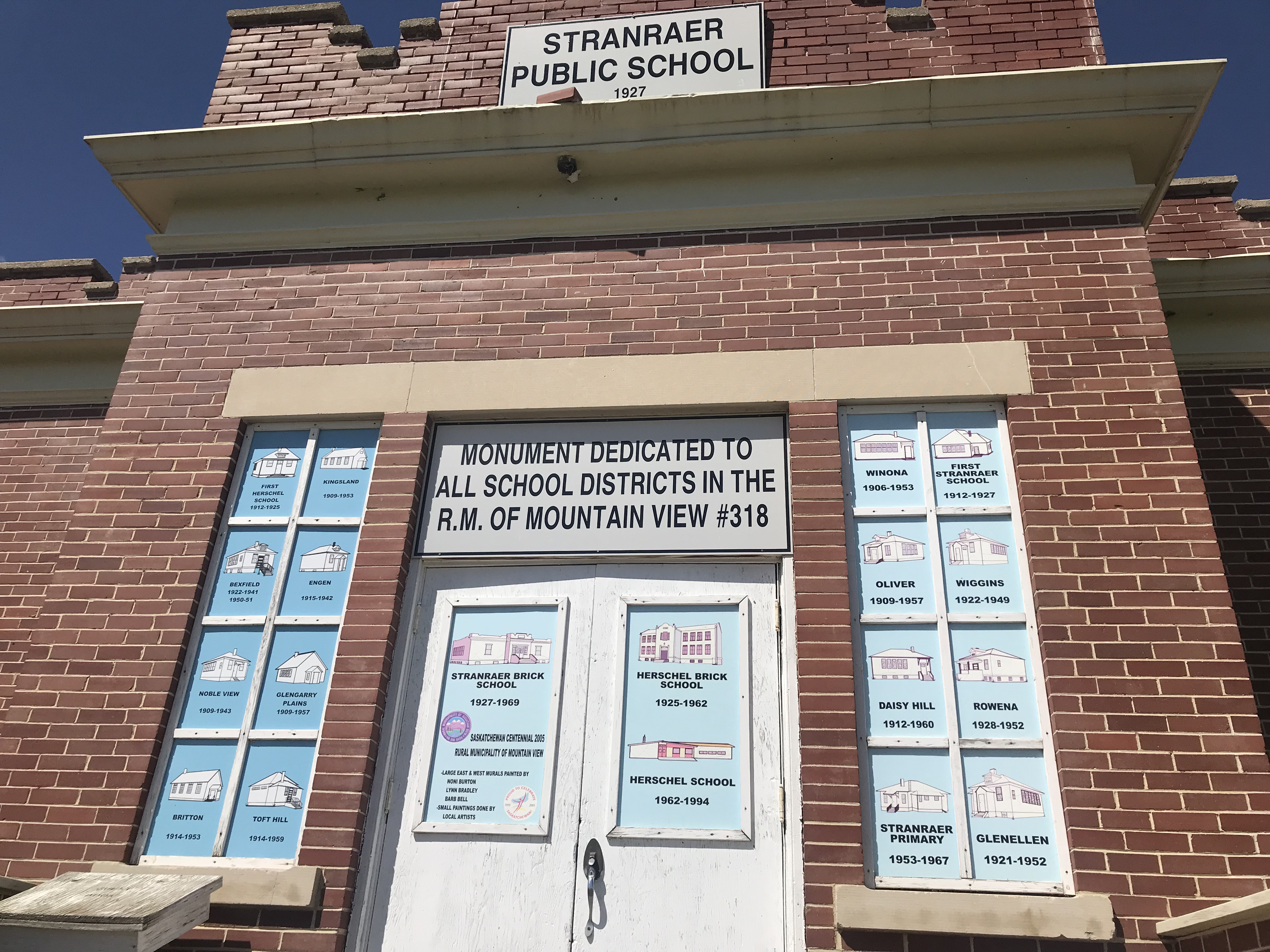
Stranraer school

Stranraer school

Stranraer school

Stranraer school

Stranraer school

== See also ==
- List of communities in Saskatchewan
