= Herschel Supply Co. =

Canadian hipster retro backpack manufacturer

- Industry: Fashion
- Founded: 2009
- Founder: Lyndon Cormack and Jamie Cormack
- Headquarters: Vancouver, British Columbia, Canada
- Website: www.herschel.com

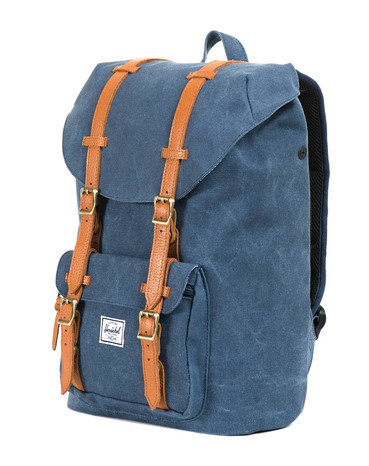
A Herschel backpack (2013)

Herschel Supply Co. (or simply Herschel) is a Canadian company selling hipster retro backpacks and accessories. The company was founded in 2009 by Lyndon and Jamie Cormack, and is based in Vancouver, British Columbia.

Herschel manufactures its products in China and Southeast Asia. They make backpacks, duffel bags, other luggage, hats and other accessories. The brand is aimed at 18-to-35-year-old consumers, and is based on evoking a sense of nostalgia – for instance through synthetic leather straps and an old-time logo, as well as through its name, which refers to Herschel, Saskatchewan, a very small Canadian hamlet where the founders' great grandparents settled.

Herschel's first store in Canada opened in Vancouver's Gastown in 2018. Herschel operates 44 retail locations worldwide, from Hong Kong to Dubai to Paris. Slate described the brand as "a global phenomenon, glimpsed wherever hipsters dare to tread".
