= Ancient Echoes Interpretive Centre =

Museum and interpretive centre in Herschel, Saskatchewan, Canada

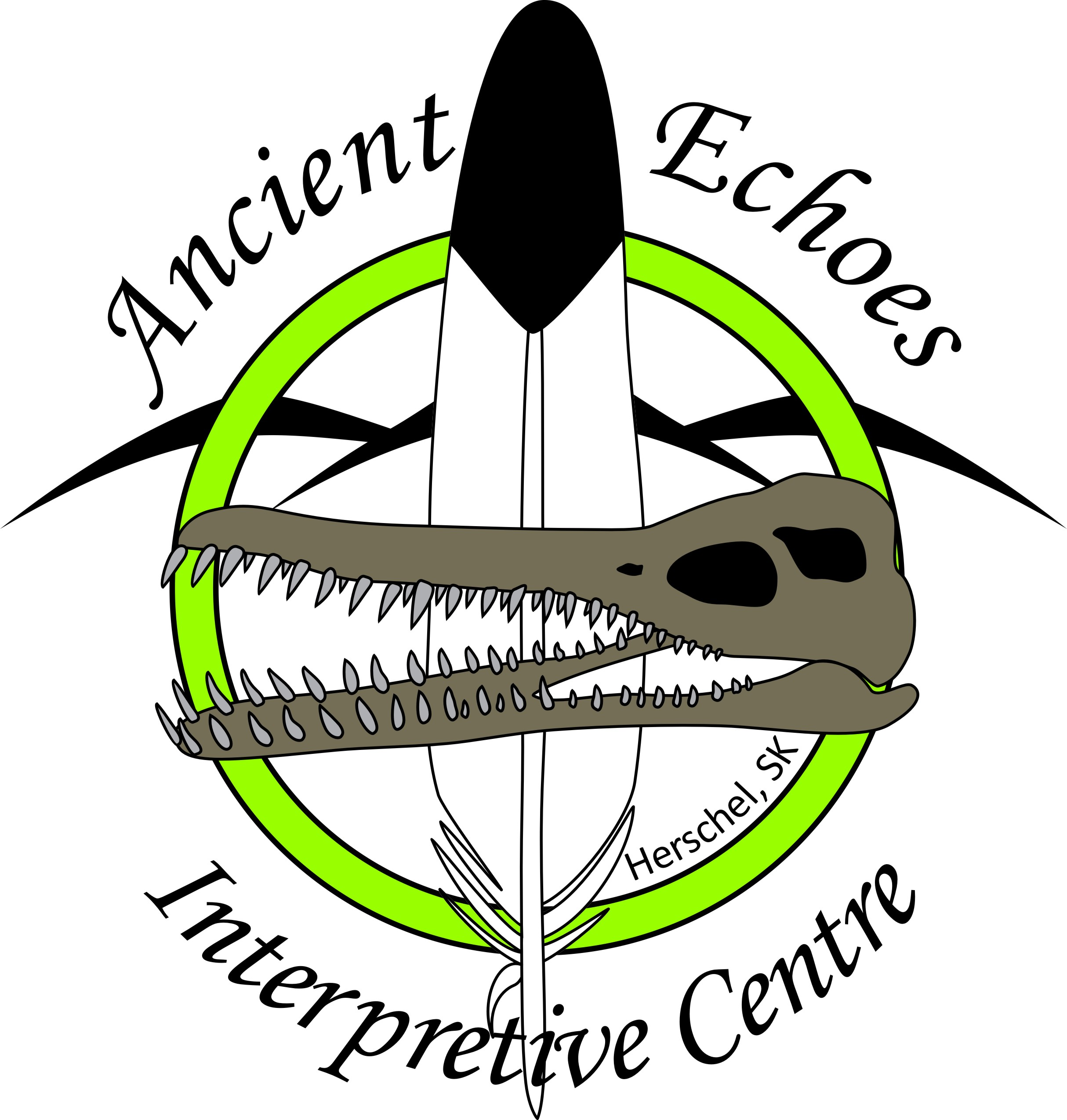

- Ancient Echoes Interpretive Centre
- Established: 1994
- Location: Herschel, Saskatchewan, Canada
- Coordinates: 51.655°N 108.423°W
- Type: First Nations history, natural history, ancient history
- Key holdings: “The Disappearance and Resurgence of the Buffalo”
- Collections: Art, archaeology, paleontology, geology, biology
- Executive director: Brittany Gilchrist
- Chairperson: Crystal Craig
- Website: http://www.ancientechoes.ca

Ancient Echoes Interpretive Centre is a community-based museum and interpretive centre, founded in 1994, that educates, conserves, protects, and promotes the history, the peoples and the assets of the land forming the Eagle Creek Valley and Coal Mine Ravine located in Herschel, Saskatchewan, Canada.

== Overview ==
The centre began in the fall of 1994, after the closure of the local elementary school, which the board of directors bought from the school division for a small sum.

Ancient Echoes Interpretive Centre is located northwest of Rosetown in the village of Herschel. It is a community-based project that serves the west central area of Saskatchewan for the educational and preservation purposes of the site and as a community centre. It sits atop the Coalmine ravine and overlooks several fossil beds and a First Nations ceremonial complex designated a Municipal Heritage Site by the province of Saskatchewan. Over the years, several professional archaeology and paleontology excavations have taken place at the centre.

Ancient Echoes is now under the umbrella of the R.M. of Mountain View #318. The centre has three key areas of focus: prehistoric era, aboriginal history, and the ecology of the area, which is native prairie. The area includes aboriginal historical sites including petroglyphs. They have archaeological dig-sites and paleontology excavation sites which includes many marine fossils like plesiosaurs and mosasaurs, including the only example of an Dolichorhynchops herschelensis in the world. There are guided hikes through the ravine area to see the different sites and exhibits that contain a natural history display, aboriginal artifacts and a permanent painting collection about the disappearance of the plains bison by Quebec artist, Jo Cooper.

Outside the centre is a life-size statue of a plains grizzly bear created by William Epp that once roamed the prairie before they disappeared in the early 20th century. The centre also pays tribute to the James Carnegie, 9th Earl of Southesk who came to this part of Saskatchewan, from Kinnaird, Scotland, in 1859 on a hunting expedition in search of large game, including the plains grizzly. His diary details his encounter with a bear in the Bad Hills near Herschel.

Ancient Echoes is a popular site for school tours throughout the year, offering custom-designed programs for students of all ages in the areas of Aboriginal history, ecology and archaeology. It also offers summer programs including traditional pottery making, drum making, ecology and paleontology hikes, full-moon hikes, educational and craft days for children. The centre provides programs for school groups and the general public. It accommodates all age levels, interest levels and group sizes. It offers special programs throughout the summer months and a few in the winter months. It a seasonal facility open Tuesdays–Sundays from May to the end of August, and then by request through the winter and spring.

== History ==
In October 1994, what was then called The Herschel Interpretive Centre was officially established. It was staffed by a dedicated team of volunteers and funded by individual and corporate donations, as well as a small government grant. The centre's mandate is as follows: "Ancient Echoes is a community-based project which interprets, conserves, and promotes the history, the peoples and the assets of the land forming the Eagle Creek Valley and beyond the Coal Mine Ravine in Herschel, Saskatchewan."

Over the years, Ancient Echoes has received many generous donations from local artisans and large companies. These include the contribution of several taxidermy pieces from local taxidermist Lyle Waddington. While preparations were being made to open the centre in 1994, Waddington donated many native bird and mammal species found in the Herschel area. These included a full 900 kilogram buffalo mount, which is displayed at the centre to this day.

Around this same time, Rosetown resident and woodcarver Jack Klemmer visited Ancient Echoes for the first time. Since then, his carvings have been on display at the centre, and the proceeds from their sale have been donated to Ancient Echoes. Also in the late 1990s, the centre received a $5,000 donation from Enbridge Pipelines to purchase shipping carts for the centre's displays and to help pay for the initial print run of renowned Metis artist Jo Cooper's paintings, entitled “The Disappearance and Resurgence of the Buffalo”, which was displayed for the first time at Ancient Echoes Interpretive Centre, where it remains today as a permanent exhibit.

In the 1990s, the fossilized remains of three Dolichorhynchops herschelensis were discovered in the Coalmine Ravine. During this excavation paleontologists uncovered the remains of varying marine life: several shark species, numerous fish vertebrate fragments, and a mosasaur (large lizard-like marine animal). Since then, paleontologists have continued and expanded their exploration work in the Coalmine Ravine. New dinosaurs, marine reptiles, plants and other fossils are frequently found in the ravine. The Herschel area is now considered a hot spot for archaeology, paleontology, and native plants and animals.

=== Timeline ===
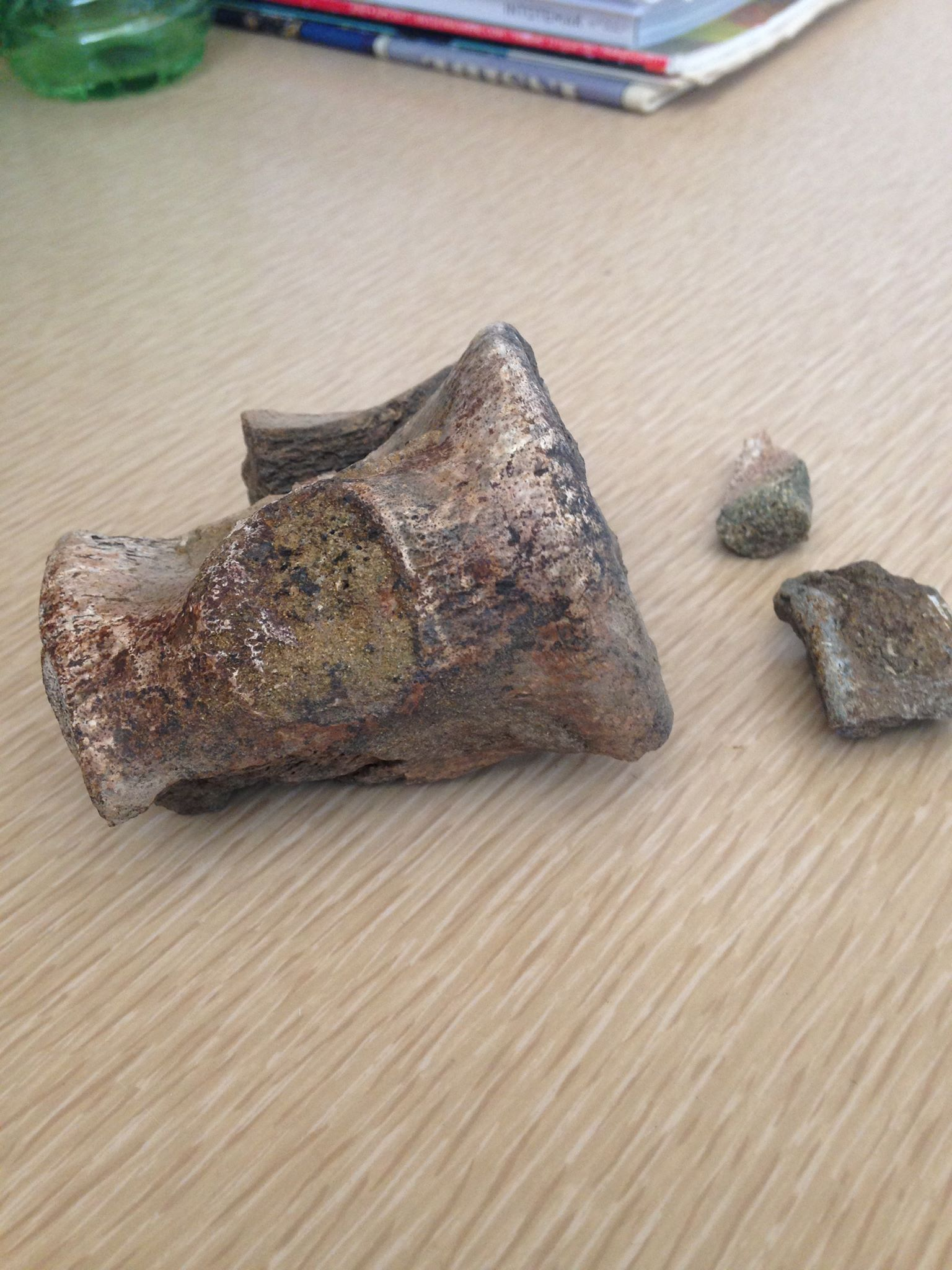
Fossilized vertebrae of a Dolichorhynchops herschelensis

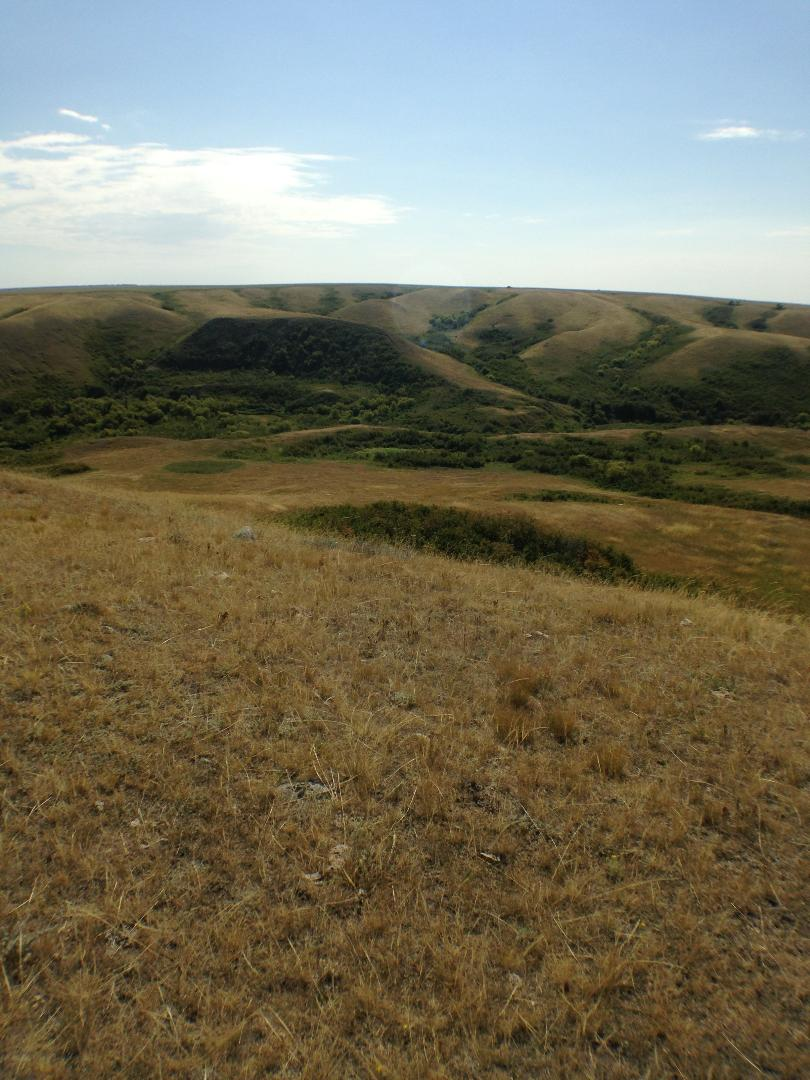
Buffalo jump at Ancient Echoes Interpretive Centre

- 65 million years ago – Herschel was submerged under the Western Interior Seaway, a strip of salt water that flowed from the Arctic down to Texas and over to the Gulf of Mexico. Fossils of many kinds were deposited on the sea bottom.
- 1960 – Petroglyph #1 was discovered by Henry Kosloski, a farmer from nearby Biggar. Despite knowing the importance of the discovery, he kept the petroglyph a secret, to protect it from vandals.
- 1961 – Herschel school (the future home of Ancient Echoes Interpretive Centre) was built.
- 1978 – Kosloski revealed his secret concerning the petroglyphs of unknown origin.
- 1988 – The petroglyph site received provincial heritage status and was designated a Municipal Heritage Site in the province of Saskatchewan.
- 1990 – The first fossilized plesiosaur was discovered in the Herschel area. It had a small head, long neck, barrel shaped body, short tail and paddles that propelled it through the water. It was about 40 feet long.
- 1992 – Preliminary mapping and test excavations were undertaken at the petroglyph site. A small, triangular projectile point, a scrapper, a biface fragment, and a few fragments of prehistoric pottery were uncovered.
- 1993 – Further excavations were undertaken at the petroglyph sites. Findings included various objects believed to be offerings. These served to show the continuous use of the site from approximately 600AD to 1900AD.
- 1994 – The first plesiosaur was excavated and moved to the Royal Tyrrel Museum in Drumheller, Alberta. Herschel kindergarten to elementary school were closed due to declining attendance. The Herschel Development Committee negotiated with the Rosetown school division to buy the school and a former teacherage for $1. Further excavations occurred near Monolith 1. The Herschel Interpretive Centre was officially established.
- 1996 – Jo Cooper, a Metis elder from Frontenac, Quebec, came to work on her art exhibition, "The Disappearance and Resurgence of the Plains Buffalo", at Ancient Echoes Interpretive Centre. She spent the summer giving tours of the centre and the ravine, and came back often afterward.
- 1997 – Two additional plesiosaurs were discovered. During this excavation paleontologists uncovered the remains of varying marine life: two or three different shark species, numerous fish vertebrate fragments, and a mosasaur (large lizard-like marine animal). Rosetown resident and local woodcarver Jack Klemmer donated the proceeds from the sale of his carvings to the centre. Cooper's paintings were displayed at the centre.
- 1998 – The community of Herschel decided to buy Cooper's painting exhibition and have it on permanent display at Ancient Echoes. The tearing down of the elevator in town was the ideal project to raise money for the purchase of the paintings. Wood from the elevator was sold and largely responsible for the purchase of the paintings.
- 1999 – The centre received a $5,000 donation from Enbridge Pipelines. This was used for the purchase of shipping carts for the centre's displays and to help pay for the initial print runs of Cooper's paintings.
- 2005 – The plesiosaur remains were deemed a completely new species, Dolichorhynchops herschelensis, by Dr. Tamaki Sato, a Japanese vertebrate paleontologist.
- 2016 – Additional paleontology was conducted, with new dinosaurs and marine reptiles being found in the ravine.
- 2017 – Ancient Echoes celebrated Canada 150 with The Shared Land Celebration. This event was shared with representatives of the Blackfoot, Cree, Gros Ventre and Lakota Nations.
- 2018 – A visitor found a fist-sized dinosaur bone in a wash in the ravine. The centre reported the find to Emily Bramforth, a paleontologist with the Royal Saskatchewan Museum.
- 2018 – The centre was awarded the Prince of Wales Ecclesiastical Insurance Cornerstone Award by the National Trust for Canada / Fiducie nationale du Canada.
- 2018 – The centre received a 2018 National Trust Ecclesiastical Insurance Cornerstone Award, which recognizes organizations that illustrate extraordinary significance and bring benefit to a community over a sustained period of time.

== Dolichorhynchops herschelensis ==
The Ancient Echoes interpretive Centre is home to the only specimens of Dolichorhynchops herschelensis ever discovered. It was discovered to be a new species by Tamaki Sato in 2005. The fossils were discovered in the Bearpaw Formation of Saskatchewan, a Late Cretaceous (late Campanian to Maastrichtian) rock formation. The fossil was found close to the town of Herschel, from which the species name is derived. The rock formation it was found in consists of sandstones, mudstones and shales laid down in the Western Interior Seaway, just before it began to revert to dry land.

The D. herschelensis skeleton was discovered was scattered around the dig site. The skull, lower jaw, ribs, pelvis and shoulder blades were all recovered, but the spine was incomplete, so the exact number of vertebrae the living animal would have had is unknown. All four limbs are missing, with the exception of nine small Phalanges (finger bones) and a small number of limb bones found close by, which may belong to the animal in question.

The fossil is believed to be that of an adult Dolichorhynchops herschelensis. It is also believed to have been substantially smaller than its close relative, D. osborni, as some juvenile specimens of D. osborni are larger than the adult specimen of D. herschelensis. Assuming that only a few vertebrae are missing from the skeleton, the animal is estimated to be about 2.5 to 3 metres in length. The snout is long and thin, with numerous tooth sockets. However, very few of the thin, sharp teeth remain.

== Permanent exhibits ==
Ancient Echoes Interpretive Centre offers both indoor and outdoor educational tours of its paleontology sites and exhibits which include dinosaur and fossil displays, geological specimens and a dinosaur dig site. The centre's prairie grasslands ecology exhibit and tour includes endangered prairie plants as well as traditional first nations medicine and food, animals in the wild, and taxidermy displays. The First Nations exhibit and tours includes the history of First Nations people in the Herschel area and tours of a traditional ceremonial complex which includes petroglyphs, a vision quest site, a turtle effigy, archaeological dig, tipi rings, buffalo jump, pemmican processing site, tool artifacts and pottery making displays. Artifacts related to James Carnegie, 9th Earl of Southesk's visit in 1959 round out the exhibits.

The centre also boasts an exhibit of art by renowned Metis artist Jo Cooper titled “The Disappearance and Resurgence of the Buffalo” which explores the history of the plains bison in the region. A life-sized sculpture by artist William Epp, of the now extinct plains grizzly bear shot close to where the centre now stands, by famed Scottish hunter James Carnegie, 9th Earl of Southesk on a hunting trip to the area in 1859, can be found on the grounds of the centre alongside a unique metal sculpture of a Dolichorhynchops herschelensis.

== Rotating exhibits ==
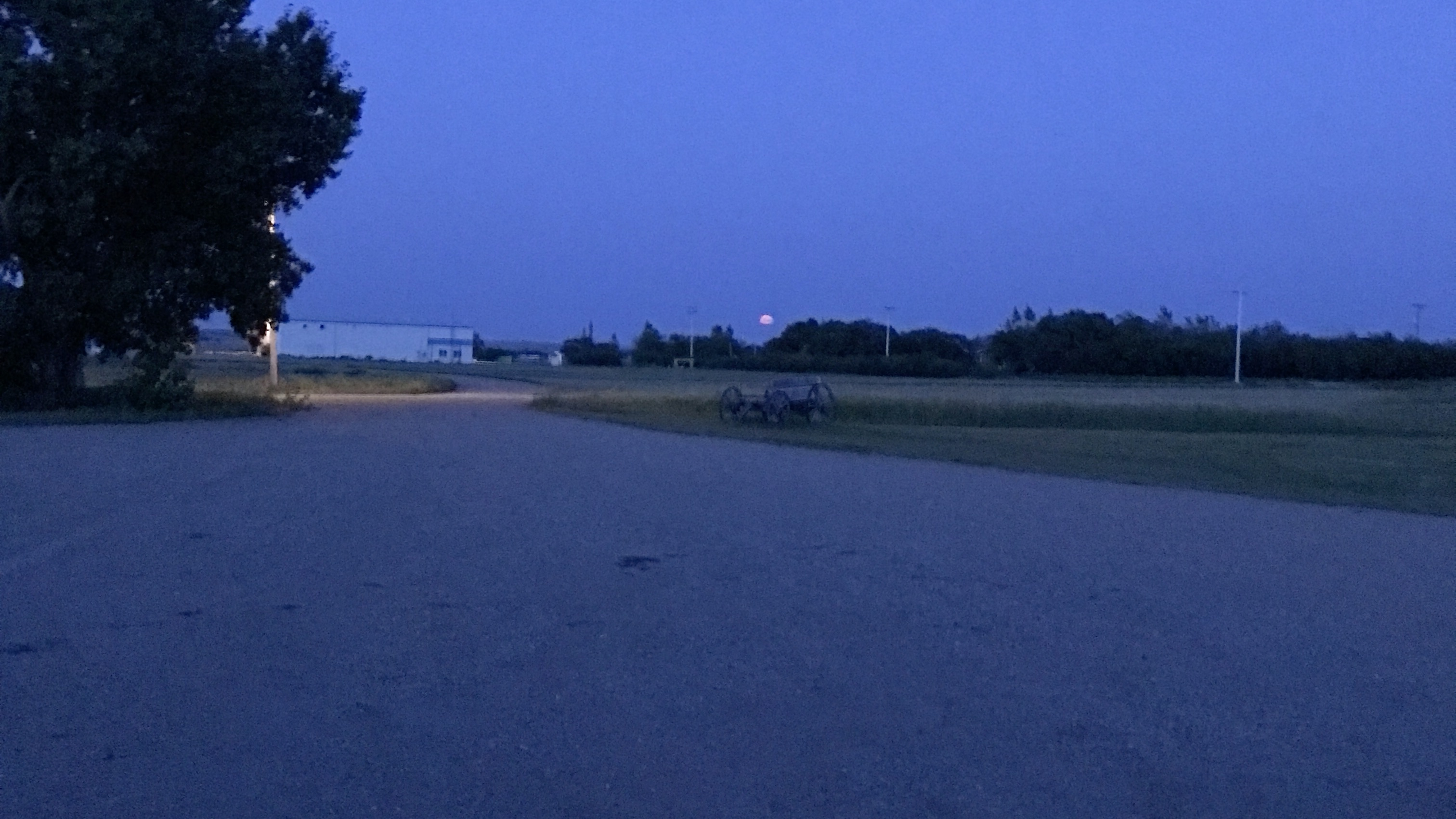
Full moon rising over Ancient Echoes Interpretive Centre in Herschel, Saskatchewan before the start of the Full Moon Hike

Ancient Echoes has added an art gallery space. The Prairie View Gallery contains numerous exhibits throughout the year celebrating new and established artists and photographers. Exhibits in this space are usually held at the centre for three months at a time.

"From Heartbreak to Healing" (2018) is an exhibit by Saskatchewan artist Jean A. Humphrey that explores her experience of her husband's Alzheimer's disease through sculptures and painting.

== The Valley View Tea and Craft Room ==
The Valley View Tea Room is found inside Ancient Echoes Interpretive Centre and is run by local volunteers. It offers coffee, tea, and other beverages, and features home-made baked goods including local favourites like Saskatoon berry pie. The centre's gift shop contains a variety of souvenirs for both children and adults related to the Ancient Echoes Interpretive Centre as well as the community of Herschel.

The tea room is open Wednesdays, Fridays, and Sundays from 2:30-4:30 P.M. CST during the summer and Fridays during the winter.

== The Herschel Museum ==
The Herschel Museum is located in the former St. Boniface Catholic Church that was built in 1926. The church closed in 1969 and the building was sold and donated to the Village of Herschel in 1988 when it was officially opened as the Herschel Museum.

Displays include a local original kitchen, living room, bedroom, and household artifacts. Souvenirs of the Herschel School are collected here, although the school photos are displayed in an album at Ancient Echoes. There is a large collection of local sports memorabilia, tools, and agricultural equipment here. The Rural Municipality of Mountain View No. 318 has collections of books, maps, and artifacts on display as well.

Access to the museum is granted only through Ancient Echoes Interpretive Centre. Educational programming and guided school tours focusing on history, nature/biology, First Nations culture, paleontology and archaeology are available. Local and Saskatoon-based school groups are common in the spring and summer.
