= Rural Municipality of Mountain View No. 318 =

Rural municipality in Saskatchewan, Canada

Mountain View No. 318
- Rural municipality
- Rural Municipality of Mountain View No. 318
- The Herschel Museum, located in a former church

- Location of the RM of Mountain View No. 318 in Saskatchewan
- Coordinates: 51.751°N 108.343°W
- Country: Canada
- Province: Saskatchewan
- Census division: 12
- SARM division: 6
- Formed: December 13, 1909

Government
  - Reeve: Rodney G. Wiens
  - Governing body: RM of Mountain View No. 318 Council
  - Administrator: Rachel Deobald
  - Office location: Herschel

Area (2016)
  - Land: 840.03 km^{2} (324.34 sq mi)

Population (2016)
  - Total: 337
  - Density: 0.4/km^{2} (1.0/sq mi)
- Time zone: CST
  - Summer (DST): CST
- Area codes: 306 and 639

The Rural Municipality of Mountain View No. 318 (2016 population: 337) is a rural municipality (RM) in the Canadian province of Saskatchewan within Census Division No. 12 and SARM Division No. 6.

== History ==
The RM of Mountain View No. 318 incorporated as a rural municipality on December 13, 1909. Its incorporation was triggered by a petition compiled by a municipal committee and sent to the Municipal Commissioner for Saskatchewan on May 19, 1909. It asked for the authority to proceed with an election whereby local residents would vote on whether to proceed with the establishment of an official RM. At the same time, a list of potential names for the RM was submitted. In all there were seven suggestions including Glengarry, Bramley and Newbury but it was the name Mountain View that prevailed. Prior to incorporation, the area was known as the Mountain View Local Improvement District (No. 16-N-3). Councillors elected to the Local Improvement District included:

- Division 1: Charles T. Ramsey;
- Division 2: Frank Cutten;
- Division 3: Alex Walker;
- Division 4: William J. Heatherington (Chairman);
- Division 5: D. Dubrueil; and
- Division 6: M. J. McMillan.

Charles Lawrence, Notary Public, Berkshire Farm, of Wiggins was Secretary-Treasurer.

On June 15, 1909, the Municipal Commissioner agreed to hold elections for the new RM on July 20, 1909. 52 voters turned out that day to cast their ballots. The results of the election were clear. 36 people voted in favour of establishing a new RM, while 16 people voted against the proposal. A letter dated August 16 from the Deputy Municipal Commissioner officially established the RM of Mountain View No. 318 on December 13, 1909.

In the early years of the RM, large areas of land in the municipality were taken up by large farms. The Engen farm of 1909 contained 9 sections; the Lamborn farm of 1910 contained 5 sections (sold later to a group of Mennonite settlers in 1925) and the Bellamy farm of 1912 contained 17 sections. The Engen and Bellamy farms were later broken up into smaller farms. Now history is reversing itself; the smaller farms are being taken over by larger farming units.

== Geography ==
The RM is drained by Eagle Creek which flows in a southeasterly direction. The valley of this creek is approximately one mile wide, and in most places is more than 100 feet deep. The ground surface on the uplands varies from gently undulating to quite hilly. The elevations a long the valley vary from approximately 1,950 feet at Lake Opuntia to 1,900 feet where the stream leaves the municipality. The elevation rises to the southwest and northeast of the valley. A portion of the area is mantled by moraine deposits. The remainder of the area is covered by glacial till or boulder clay.

=== Communities and localities ===
The following unincorporated communities are within the RM.

Special service areas

- Herschel (restructured to hamlet, December 31, 2006)

Localities

- Downe
- Glenellen
- Kingsland
- Stranraer (dissolved as a village)

== Demographics ==
Population history (1981–2016)
Year	Pop.	±%
1981	505	—
1986	480	−5.0%
1991	413	−14.0%
1996	371	−10.2%
2001	304	−18.1%
2006	333	+9.5%
2011	333	+0.0%
2016	337	+1.2%
Source: Statistics Canada via Saskatchewan Bureau of Statistics

In the 2021 Census of Population conducted by Statistics Canada, the RM of Mountain View No. 318 had a population of 358 living in 109 of its 128 total private dwellings, a change of 6.2% from its 2016 population of 337. With a land area of 847.02 km^{2} (327.04 sq mi), it had a population density of 0.4/km^{2} (1.1/sq mi) in 2021.

In the 2016 Census of Population, the RM of Mountain View No. 318 recorded a population of 337 living in 109 of its 129 total private dwellings, a 1.2% change from its 2011 population of 333. With a land area of 840.03 km^{2} (324.34 sq mi), it had a population density of 0.4/km^{2} (1.0/sq mi) in 2016.

== Economy ==
With the coming of the homesteaders, the plough turned land that once produced grass to support vast herds of plains bison, now it has become some of the best agricultural land in Saskatchewan. This is due in part to the RM being located in the Dark Brown Soil Region of the province. This has resulted in very high wheat yields over the years. There is also an abundance of good ranch land in the RM as the fertile flat land in the middle of the municipality is bordered on the north by the Bear Hills and on the south by the Bad Hills. The hill regions of the area are idea for grazing livestock. Today, agriculture is the primary economic activity in the RM.

In the 1930s soft coal began to be mined a small valley just south of Herschel, which lead to the valley being named, the Coal Mine Ravine. Today the ravine is no longer mined for coal but it is home to the Ancient Echoes Interpretive Centre, several archaeological sites, as well as being home to several endangered species of plants and the remains of a former First Nations/Metis/pioneer Red River Cart trail.

== Attractions ==
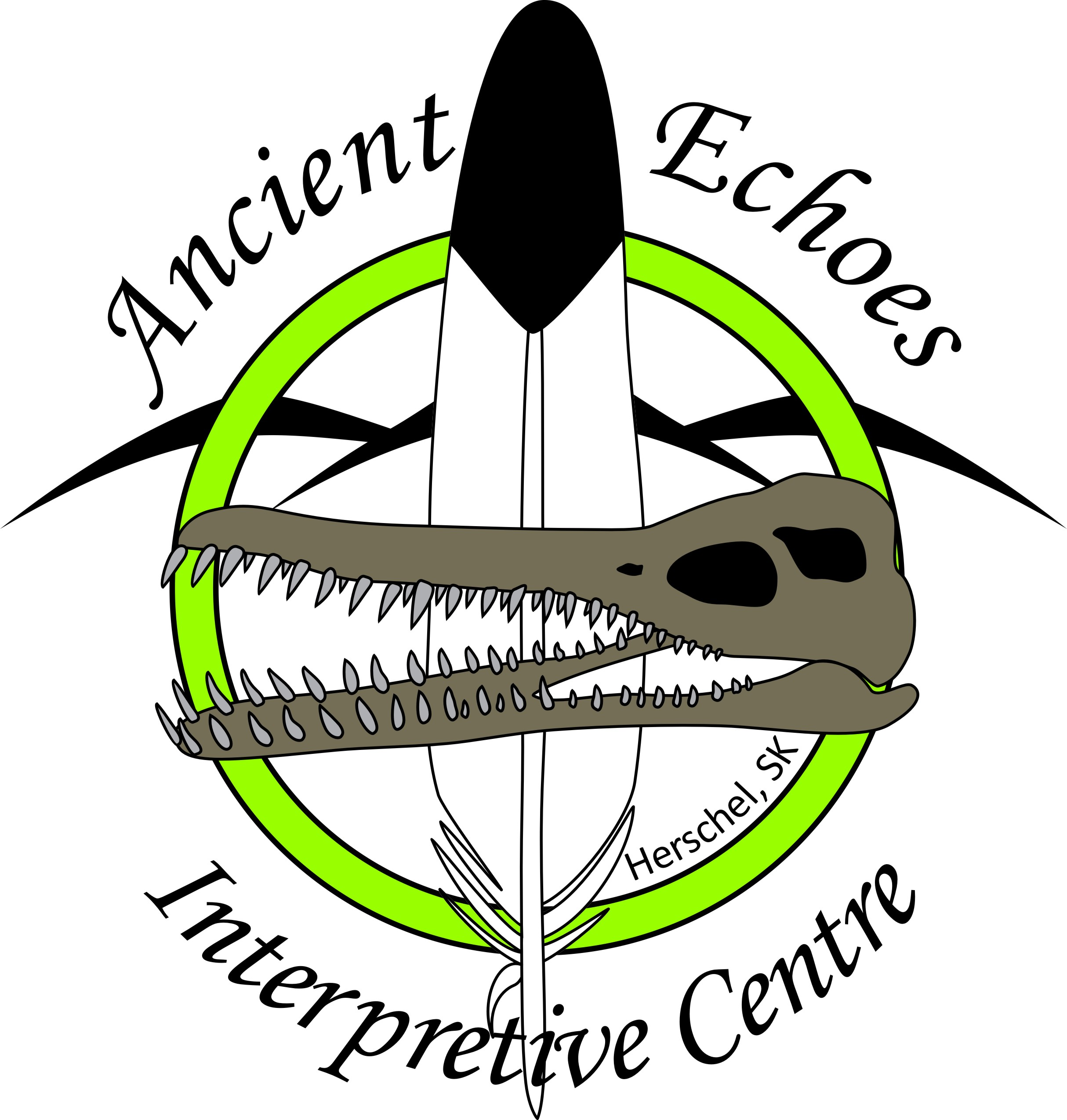
Ancient Echoes Interpretive Centre in the RM of Mountain View No. 31

- Ancient Echoes Interpretive Centre - a museum, First Nations ceremonial site and interpretive centre in Herschel, designated as a provincial Municipal Heritage Property.
- Stranraer United Church - a history church constructed in Stranraer between 1926 and 1929, designated as a provincial Municipal Heritage Property.
- Stranraer School 651 - a former school, completed in 1927 and a monument to dedicated to all school districts in the RM of Mountain View No. 318.
- Herschel Retreat House
- Herschel Memorial Hall
- Herschel Memorial Rink
- Herschel Museum
- Herschel Ebenfeld Mennonite Church
- Stranraer Commemorative Library
- Opuntia Lake Bird Sanctuary

== Government ==
The RM of Mountain View No. 318 is governed by an elected municipal council and an appointed administrator that meets on the second Tuesday of every month. The reeve of the RM is Rodney G. Wiens while its administrator is Rachel Deobald. The RM's office is located in Herschel.

== Transportation ==
In 1911 the rail line from Macklin to Rosetown was formally opened for traffic through the RM. The branch line of the Canadian Pacific Railway follows the Eagle Creek valley through the southwest corner of the municipality, and on it were situated the villages of Herschel and Stranraer.

- Highway 31
- Highway 656
- Kerrobert – Rosetown spur of the Canadian Pacific Railway

Remnants of the historic Swift Current–Battleford Trail can be found in the RM as well as several other trails.

== Gallery ==
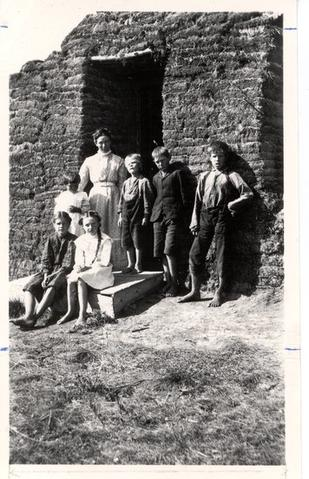
Teacher and students outside of Wynona school near Stranraer in1909

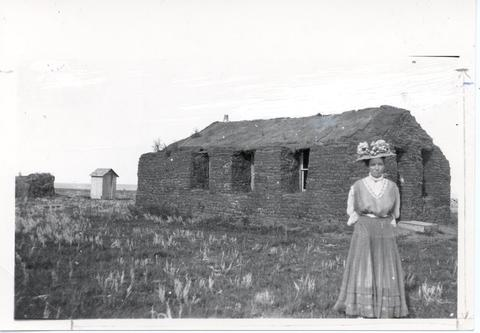
Teacher outside of Wynona school, near Stranraer Saskatchewan 1909

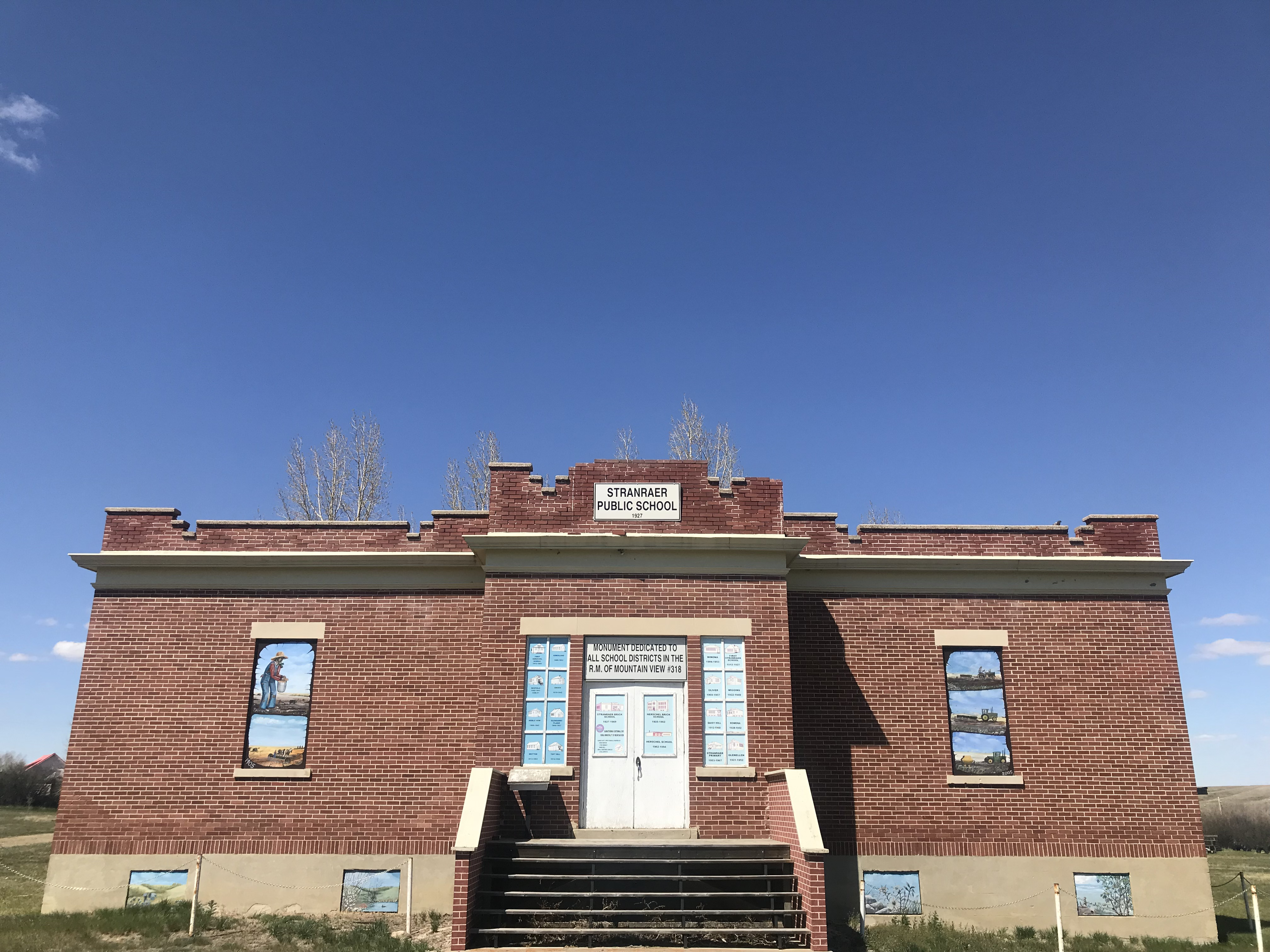
Stranraer, Saskatchewan school

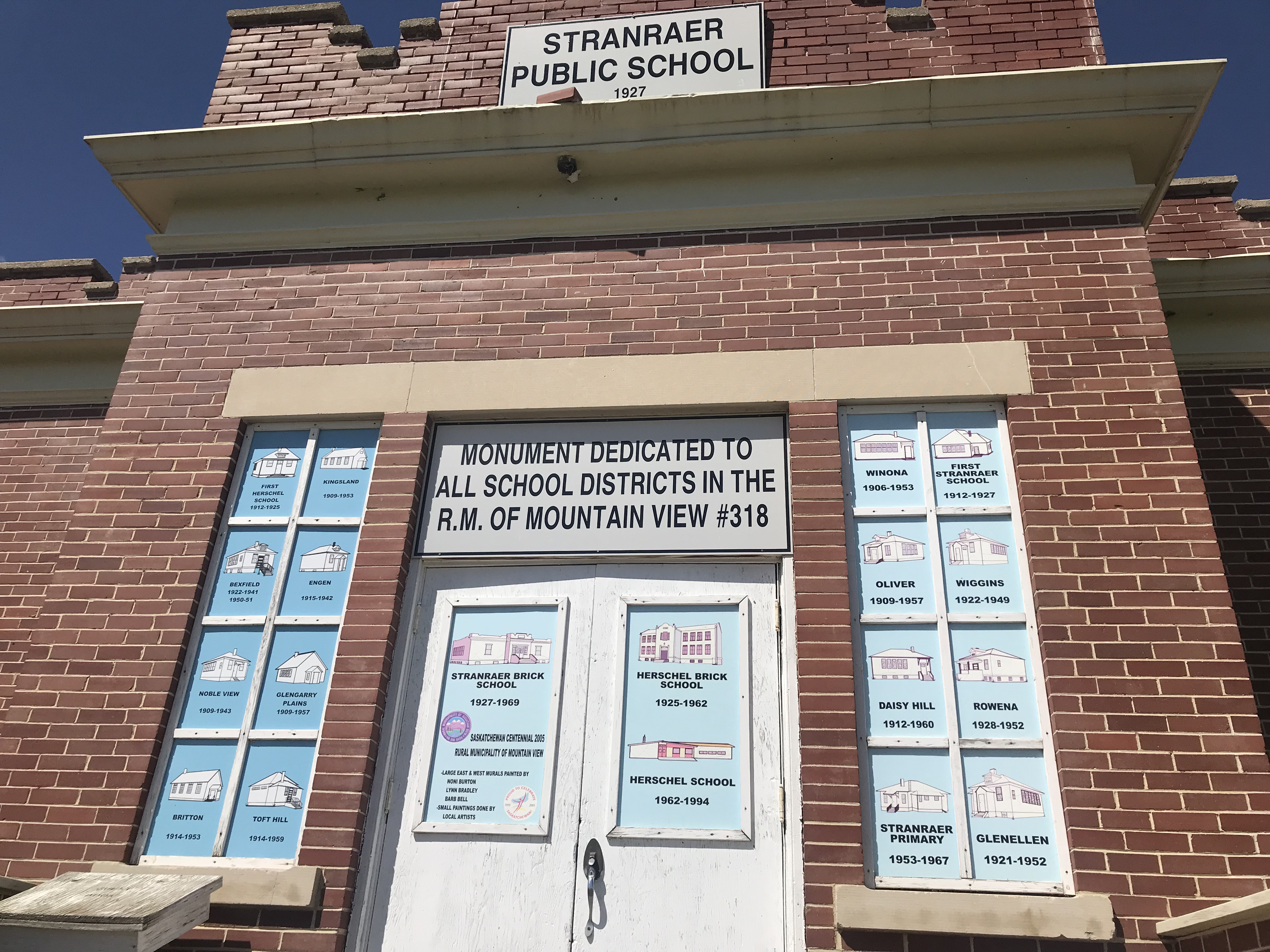
Stranraer, Saskatchewan school

Stranraer, Saskatchewan school

Stranraer, Saskatchewan school

Stranraer, Saskatchewan school

Stranraer, Saskatchewan school

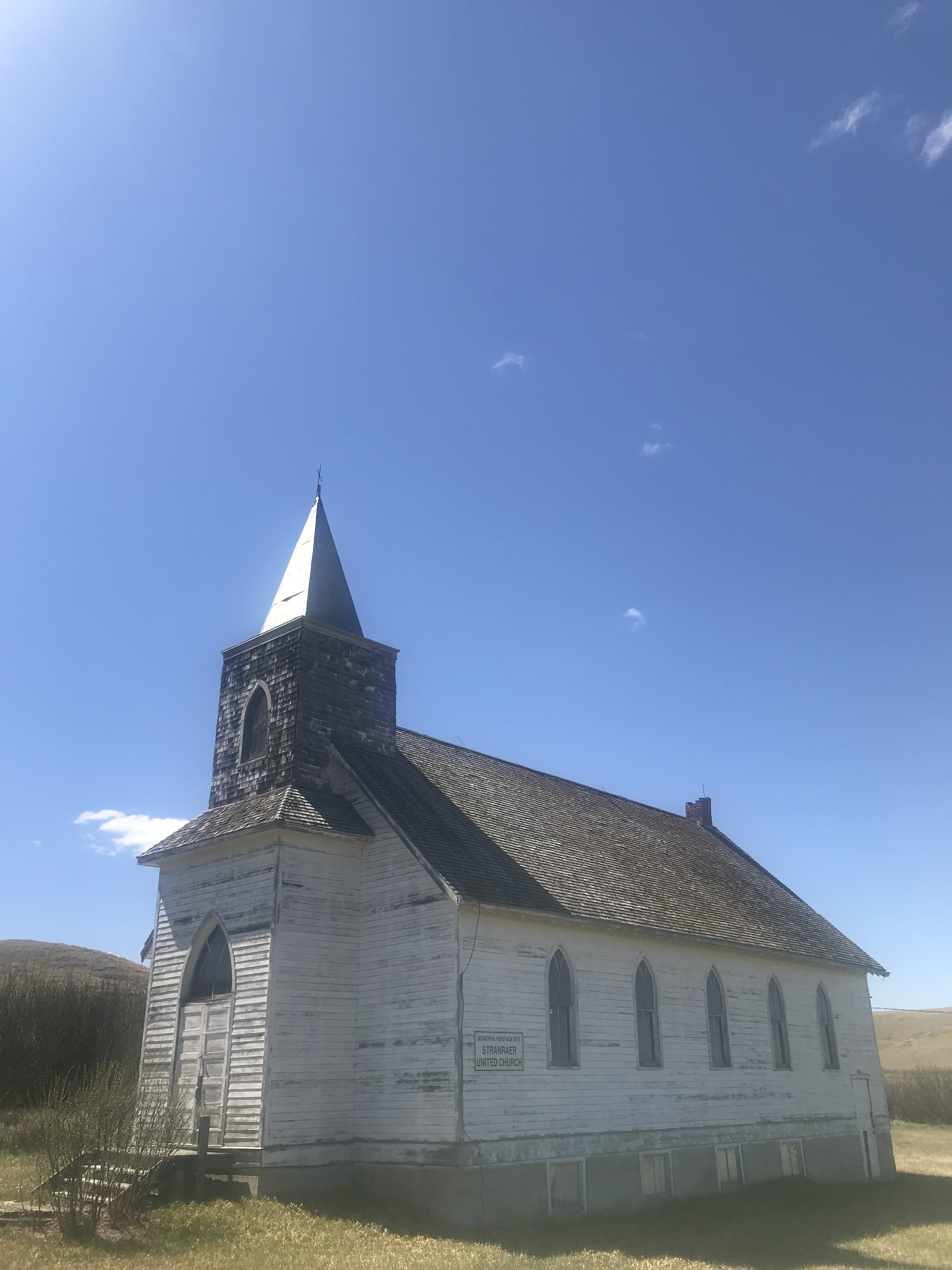
Stranraer, Saskatchewan United Church

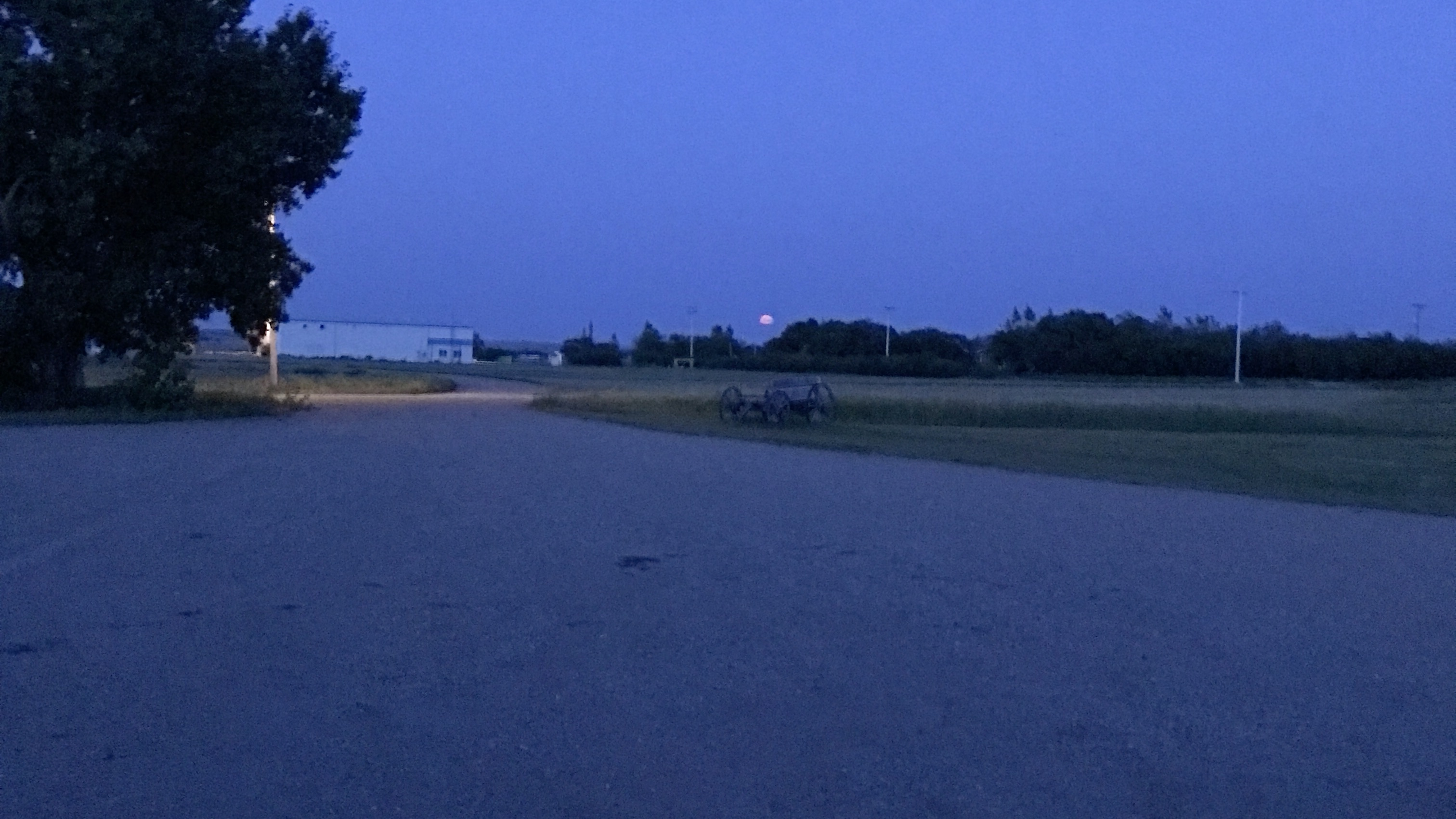
Full moon over Herschel

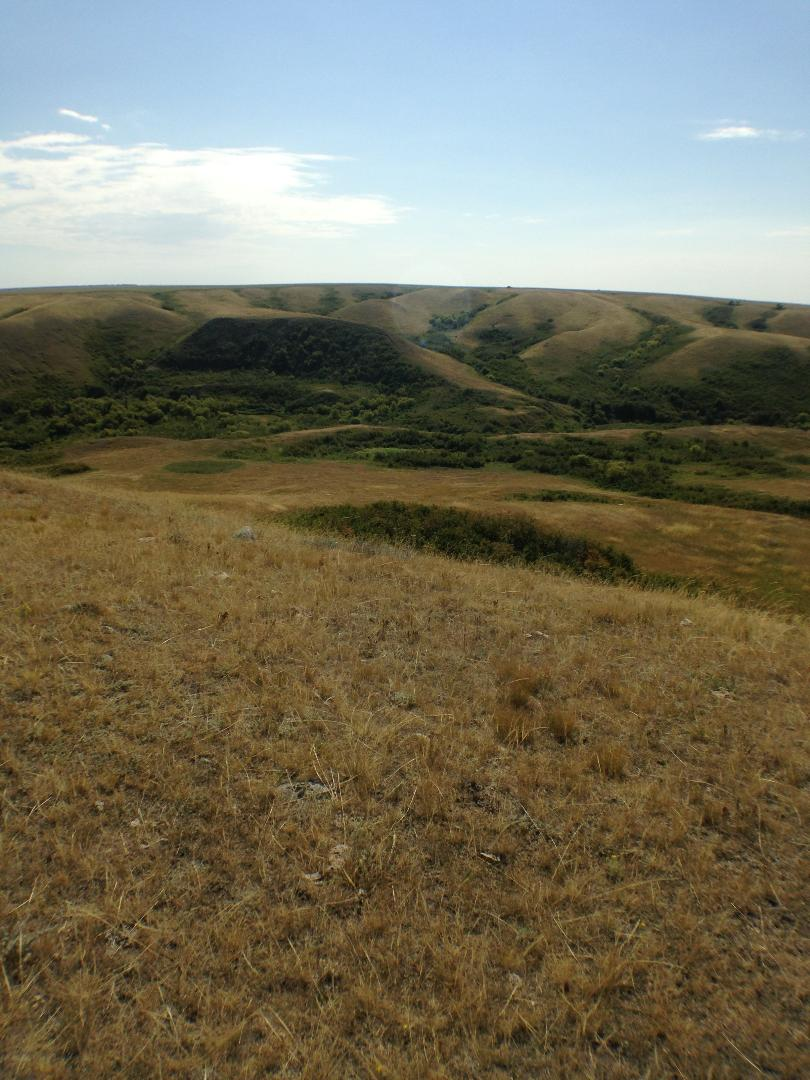
A buffalo jump and pemmican processing site in the Coalmine Ravine near Herschel

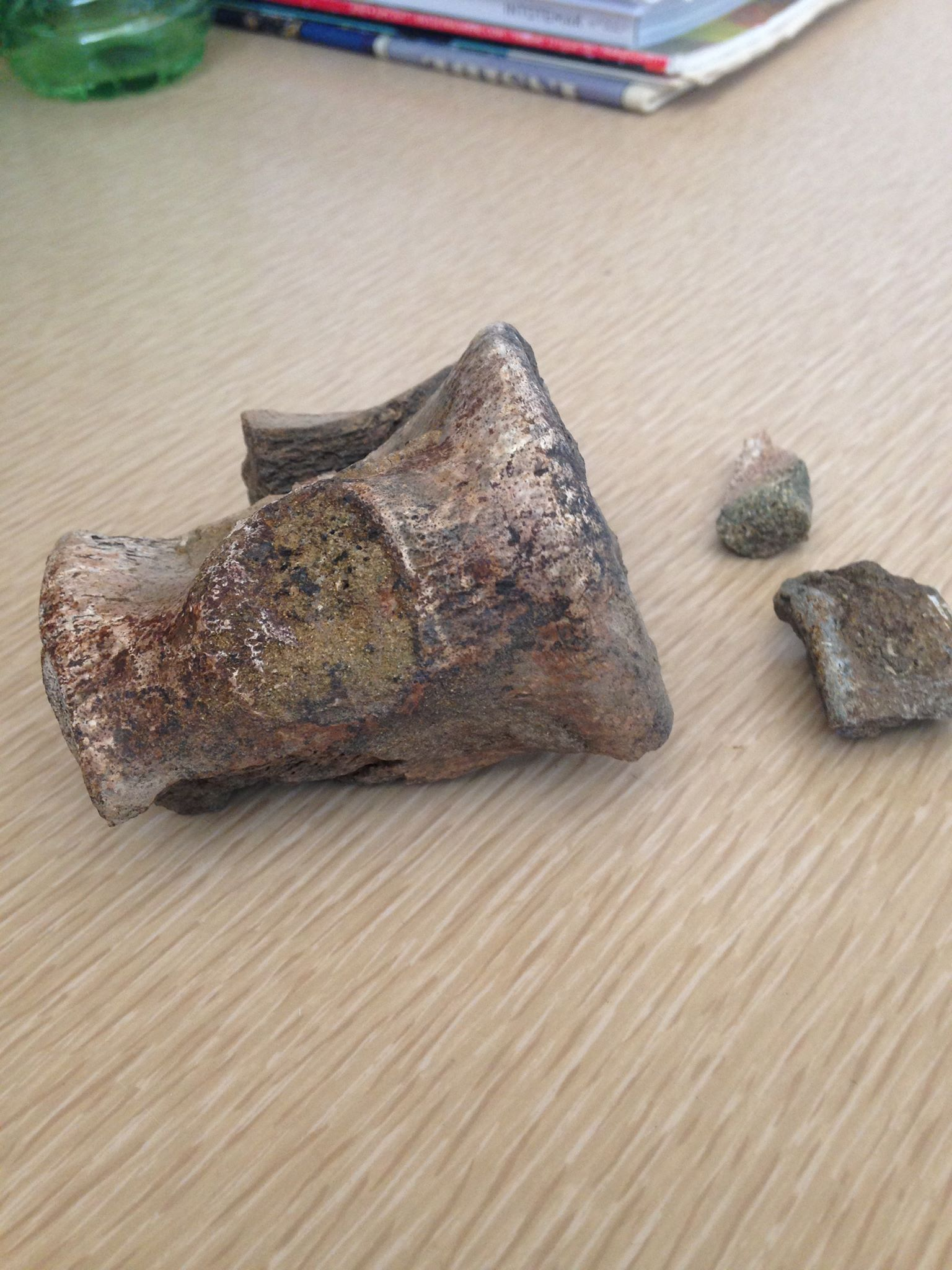
Fossilized vertebrae of a unique species of short-necked plesiosaur discovered near Herschel

== See also ==
- List of rural municipalities in Saskatchewan
