= Cut Knife Creek =

River in Saskatchewan, Canada

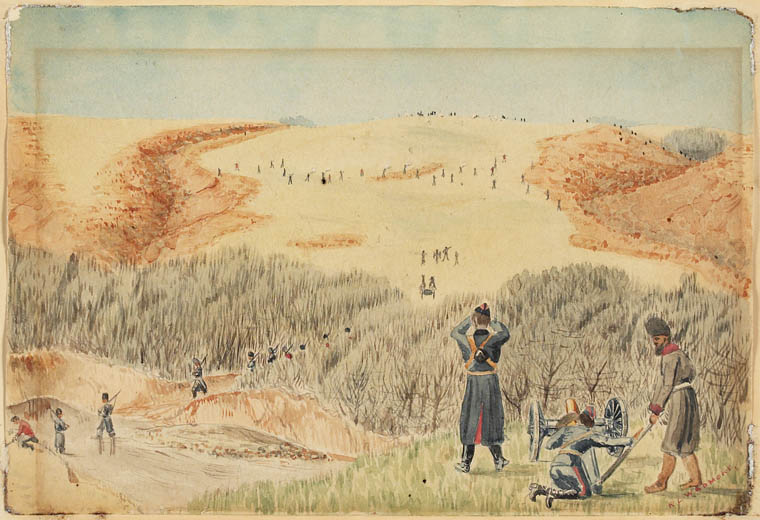
- Battle at Cut Knife Creek

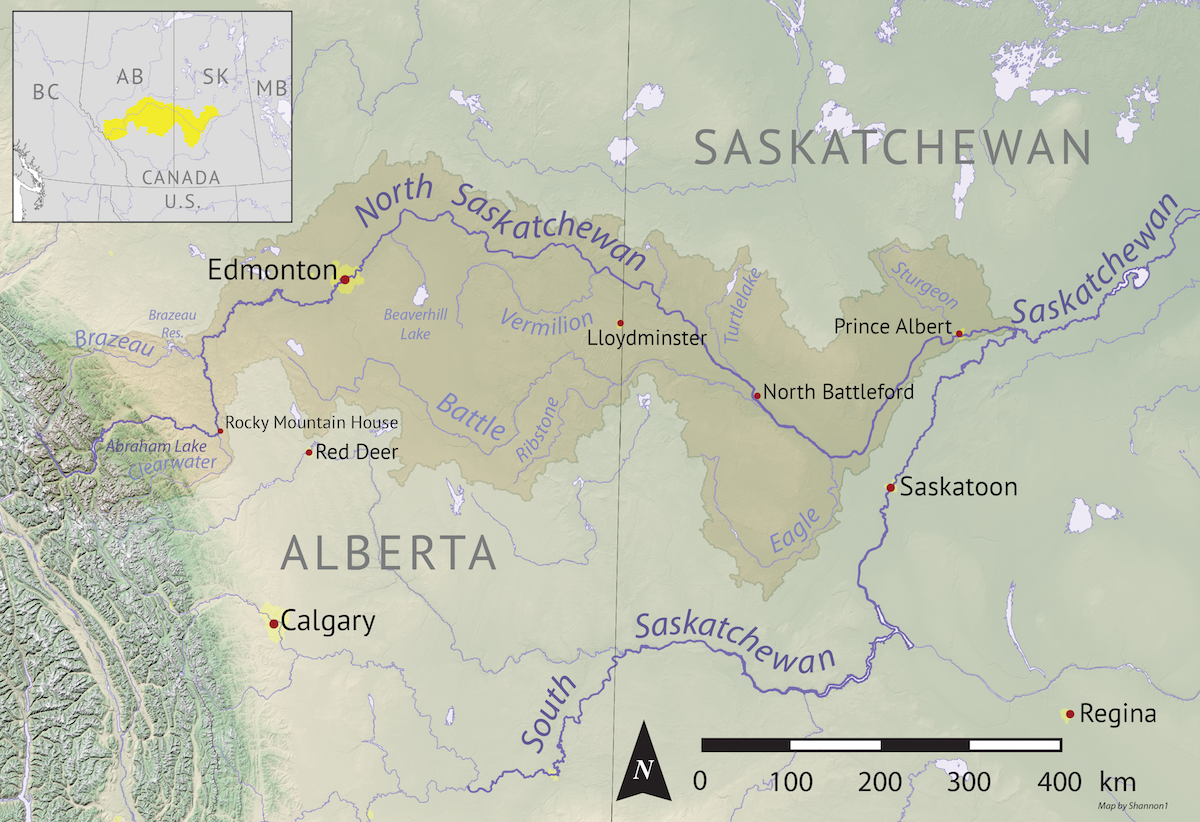
- Map of the North Saskatchewan River drainage basin

- Location of river's mouth in Saskatchewan Cut Knife Creek (Canada)

Location
- Country: Canada
- Province: Saskatchewan

Physical characteristics
- Source
  - location: RM of Cut Knife No. 439
  - coordinates: 52.6692°N 109.1405°W
- Mouth: Battle River
  - location: Poundmaker Cree Nation
  - coordinates: 52.9051°N 108.9447°W

Basin features
- River system: Nelson River
- Landmarks: Battle of Cut Knife
- Tributaries
  - left: Poundmaker Creek
  - right: Saline Creek

Cut Knife Creek is a river in the Canadian province of Saskatchewan. The river begins about 10 kilometres (6.2 mi) south of the Highway 40 / Highway 21 intersection and ends at Battle River in the Poundmaker Cree Nation. Battle River is a major tributary of the North Saskatchewan River. The Battle of Cut Knife of the North-West Rebellion took place on Cut Knife Hill near the river on 2 May 1885. The site of the battle was designated a National Historic Site of Canada and is the location of Chief Poundmaker's grave.

'Cut Knife' is named after a Sarcee chief who was killed in a skirmish with the Cree near the area in the 1840s.

== History ==
In March 1885, Chief Poundmaker and fellow Cree band members travelled to Battleford in search of supplies and rations for famine relief. The local Indian agent refused to meet with Poundmaker and with "a lot of restless Indians wandering the vicinity of the town", the homesteaders fled to the nearby Fort Battleford. With the village deserted, the Indians looted it. In response, Lieutenant-Colonel William Otter and nearly 400 men were dispatched to attack Poundmaker. On 2 May 1885, Otter crossed Cut Knife Creek and attacked Poundmaker's camp at Cut Knife Hill. After a six-hour battle, Otter's attack was repelled by Poundmaker and his warriors. Otter and his forces retreated back across Cut Knife Creek and returned to Battleford. To prevent further bloodshed, Poundmaker ordered his forces not to pursue. Later that year, Poundmaker turned himself in and was convicted of treason. After serving seven months of a three-year sentence, he was released. He died in 1886 of a lung haemorrhage.

Cut Knife Hill has since been renamed to Chief Poundmaker Hill.

== Description ==
Cut Knife Creek begins in the RM of Cut Knife No. 439 at a slough by Highway 21 and from there heads east towards Gallivan. Cut Knife Creek passes to the south of Gallivan then turns north where it crosses Highway 40 (Poundmaker Trail) and meets Saline Creek. From Saline Creek, the river winds itself back west then turns north into the Poundmaker Cree Nation. It meets Poundmaker Creek, winds around Chief Poundmaker Hill, and empties into Battle River.

== See also ==
- List of rivers of Saskatchewan
- Hudson Bay drainage basin
- Cut Knife, Saskatchewan
