= Thackeray, Saskatchewan =

Thackeray
- Location within Saskatchewan
- Coordinates: 52.409°N 108.7°W
- Country: Canada
- Province: Saskatchewan
- Region: Northwest Saskatchewan
- Census division: 13
- Rural Municipality: Buffalo No. 409
- Post Office Founded: 1913

Government
  - Mayor: None
  - Governing body: RM of Buffalo Municipal Council

Area
  - Total: 0 km^{2} (0 sq mi)

Population (2011)
  - Total: 0
  - Density: 0/km^{2} (0/sq mi)
- Time zone: CST
- Postal code: S0K 4W0
- Area code: 306
- Highways: Highway 29 Highway 14

Thackeray, Saskatchewan is an unincorporated community, school site, and elevator site on the Canadian Pacific line running northwest of Wilkie, Saskatchewan.

The former elevator site north of the school site is now a bulk liquid blending and distribution site for Rack Petroleum.
