= Phippen =

- Location within Saskatchewan
- Coordinates: 52.409°N 108.7°W
- Country: Canada
- Province: Saskatchewan
- Region: Northwest Saskatchewan
- Census division: 13
- Rural Municipality: Buffalo No. 409
- Post Office Founded: 1909

Government
  - Mayor: None
  - Governing body: RM of Buffalo Municipal Council

Area
  - Total: 0 km^{2} (0 sq mi)

Population (2011)
  - Total: 0
  - Density: 0/km^{2} (0/sq mi)
- Time zone: CST
- Postal code: S0K 4W0
- Area code: 306
- Highways: Highway 29 Highway 14

Phippen, Saskatchewan is an unincorporated community, school site, and elevator site on the Canadian Pacific line running east–west between Wilkie, Saskatchewan and Unity, Saskatchewan.

It was thought that Phippen would be the divisional point on the Canadian Pacific Railway line west of Saskatoon, but the water supply was inadequate, so the point was moved to Wilkie, Saskatchewan.

The post office opened in 1909 and remained open until 1968. Phippen was the site of a Saskatchewan Wheat Pool grain elevator, which was taken over by the United Grain Growers in 1975. The elevator was torn down after 2000 C.E.

Phippen School was open from 1908 to 1959.
