= Saskatchewan Highway 21 =

Provincial highway in Saskatchewan, Canada

Highway 21
- Highway 21 highlighted in red
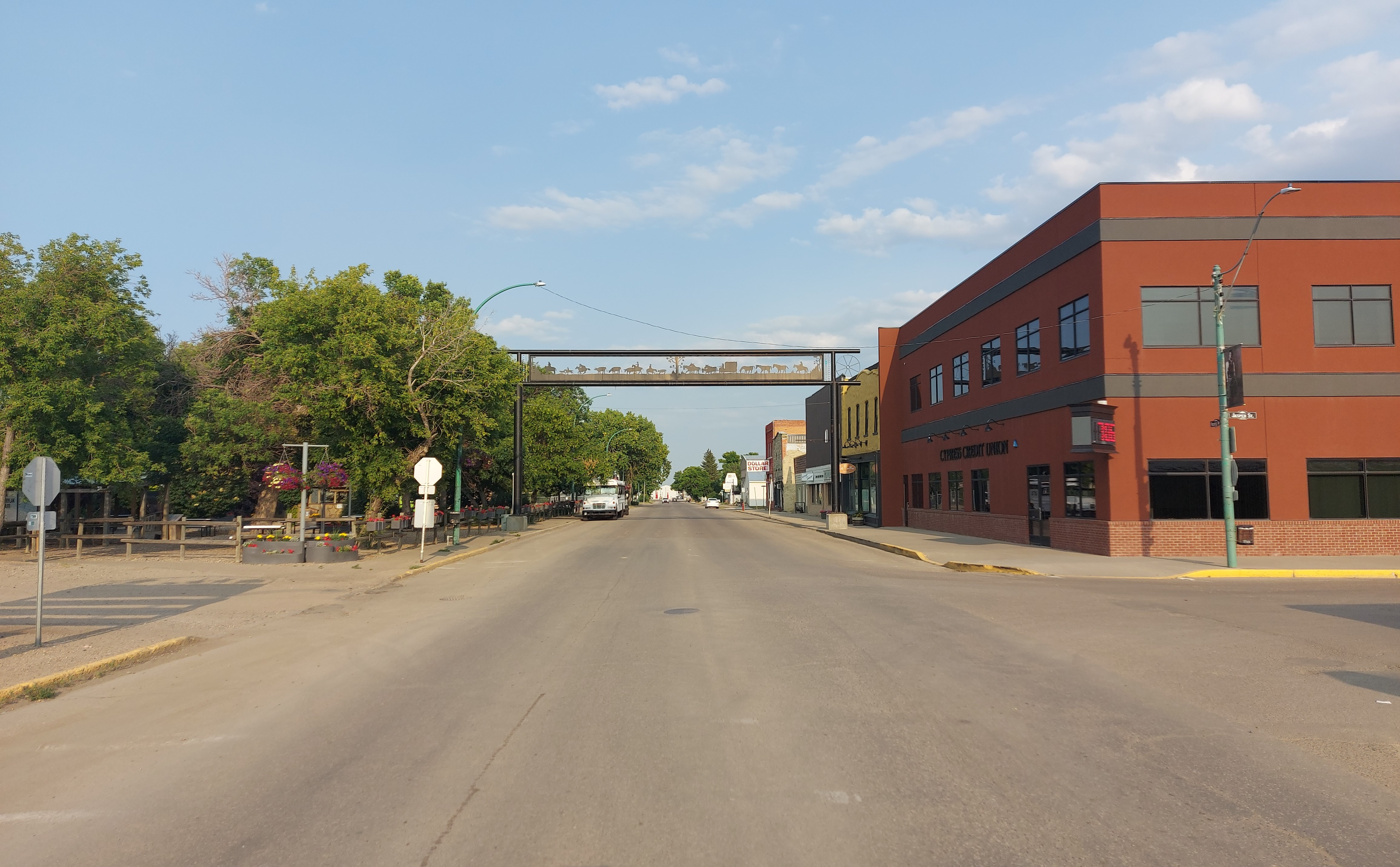
- Highway 21 through Maple Creek

Route information
- Maintained by Ministry of Highways and Infrastructure
- Length: 714.6 km (444.0 mi)

Major junctions
- South end: S-233 at the U.S. border near Havre, MT
- Highway 13 near Govenlock; Highway 1 (TCH) near Maple Creek; Highway 7 in Kindersley; Highway 31 / Highway 51 in Kerrobert; Highway 14 in Unity; Highway 40 near Cut Knife; Highway 16 (TCH/YH) near Maidstone; Highway 3 near Paradise Hill; Highway 55 in Pierceland
- North end: Highway 919 / Highway 950 in Meadow Lake Provincial Park

Location
- Country: Canada
- Province: Saskatchewan
- Rural municipalities: Reno, Big Stick, Fox Valley, Happyland, Chesterfield, Newcombe, Kindersley, Oakdale, Progress, Mariposa, Grass Lake, Tramping Lake, Round Valley, Cut Knife, Hillsdale, Eldon, Frenchman Butte, Loon Lake, Beaver River
- Towns: Maple Creek, Leader, Eatonia, Kindersley, Kerrobert, Unity, Maidstone

Highway system
- Provincial highways in Saskatchewan
← Highway 20	→ Highway 22

Highway 21 is a provincial highway in Saskatchewan, Canada. It runs from Montana Secondary Highway 233 at the United States border at Willow Creek to Highway 950 / Highway 919 within the Meadow Lake Provincial Park. Highway 21 is about 715 kilometres (444 mi) long.

Along Highway 21's route, it intersects two interprovincial highways, provides access to multiple communities, crosses several large rivers, and travels through provincial parks. The highways include the Trans-Canada and Yellowhead while some of the larger communities are Maple Creek, Kindersley, Kerrobert, and Unity. Significant rivers include the Frenchman, South Saskatchewan, Battle, and the North Saskatchewan. It crosses the North Saskatchewan River via the Toby Nollet Bridge. Near the southern end, the highway provides access to Cypress Hills Interprovincial Park, which is Canada's first interprovincial park; towards the northern end, it travels through Bronson Forest Recreation Site, which has a thriving population of wild ponies; and the northern terminus is in Meadow Lake Provincial Park, which is Saskatchewan's largest park.

== History ==
The original Provincial Highway 21 is between Highway 13 west of Robsart and Leader. It originally continued west from Leader to Estuary and Empress, Alberta, before it turned north and followed Range Road 3293, adjacent to the Alberta–Saskatchewan border. It followed a series of country roads through Loverna, Macklin, and Lloydminster to Onion Lake. In the 1930s, the Leader–Empress section was renumbered to Highway 32 while the Empress-Onion Lake segment was renumbered to Highway 17 (the section south of Macklin was later decommissioned).

At the same time, Provincial Highway 30 ran from Lemsford, through Glidden and Kindersley, to Kerrobert; the section between Lemsford and Glidden was decommissioned in the 1940s. In the 1960s, Highway 330 was commissioned between Kerrobert, through Unity, to Highway 40 west of Cut Knife. Provincial Highway 48 ran between Govenlock and Willow Creek; however in the 1960s, it was renumbered to Highway 348.

In 1971, the Chesterfield Bridge across the South Saskatchewan River was opened, extending Highway 21 to Eatonia. Bridges were opened across the Battle and North Saskatchewan Rivers later in the decade, and along with the renumbering Highways 348, 30, and 330, Highway 21 assumed its present length.

== Route description ==
Highway 21 has average annual daily traffic (AADT) of 500 vehicles a day and truck traffic is 30% of this total.

The south end of Highway 21 begins at the Willow Creek Border Crossing. From there, it heads north-west following Lodge Creek for about 6 kilometres (3.7 mi) before turning north towards Govenlock. At Govenlock, Highway 21 meets Highway 13 and begins a 44-kilometre (27 mi) long eastward concurrency that ends west of Robsart. Along this stretch, the highway crosses Battle Creek and provides access to the communities of Senate, Consul, and Vidora. At the end of the concurrency, Highway 13 continues east while Highway 21 turns north towards the town of Maple Creek. En route to Maple Creek, the highway crosses the Frenchman River, travels through the Cypress Hills, and provides access to Cypress Hills Interprovincial Park. Coming out of the hills, Highway 21 crosses Maple Creek and enters the town of Maple Creek. The highway runs along the western edge of town before turning east on Pacific Ave. After about one kilometre running concurrently with Pacific Ave, Highway 21 resumes its northerly routing for a further 8 kilometres (5.0 mi) as it heads to Highway 1 — the Trans-Canada Highway.

Once Highway 21 crosses Highway 1, it heads north towards Leader and the South Saskatchewan River. Along this section, the highway provides access to Fox Valley and Liebenthal. To the east of the highway are the Great Sand Hills. Access is from Highway 32 which intersects Highway 21 at Leader. North of Leader, the highway crosses the South Saskatchewan River via the Chesterfield Bridge and heads in a northerly direction to Eatonia. Just before Eatonia, the highway begins a 19-kilometre (12 mi) long eastward concurrency with Highway 44 that ends at Glidden. At Glidden, Highway 44 continues east while Highway 21 heads north to Kindersley and the intersection with Highway 7. From Kindersley, the highway continues north towards Kerrobert. Heading into Kerrobert, Highway 21 has a 14-kilometre (8.7 mi) long concurrency with Highway 31. At Kerrobert, it turns into the town and has a 2.4-kilometre (1.5 mi) long concurrency with both Highways 51 and 31 before heading north. Travelling north, the highway passes Grill Lake, Ear Lake, Muddy Lake, and End Lake before meeting Highway 14 and running along the eastern edge of Unity. It keeps its northerly routing and meets Highway 40 at Wilbert, at which point the two highways begin a 16-kilometre (9.9 mi) long concurrency to the north-west. Highway 21 leaves the concurrency and heads north crossing the Battle River, passing by Soda, Bryans, and Maidstone Lakes, and then meeting Highway 16 — the Yellowhead Highway — west of Maidstone.

After a short one-mile long eastward concurrency with Highway 16, Highway 21 once again heads north where it crosses the Battle River and then the North Saskatchewan River (via the Toby Nollet Bridge, which was named after Isidore Charles Nollet) en route to Highway 3. Communities and parks along this stretch include Silver Lake Regional Park, McLaren, Milleton, and Bolney. At Highway 3, Highway 21 turns west and has a 10-kilometre (6.2 mi) long concurrency with 3 that runs to just east of Paradise Hill. From there, Highway 21 heads north following the Monnery River to the Bronson Forest Recreation Site where it crosses the divide between the Saskatchewan River and Churchill River. For the final leg to its northern terminus in Meadow Lake Provincial Park, the highway crosses rivers, passes by several lakes, and provides access to Indian reserves and small communities. Some of the lakes and rivers include Cache Lake, Peck Lake, Little Fishing Lake, Ministikwan Lake, Mudie Lake, and Beaver River. Indian reserves and communities include Little Fishing Lake, Ministikwan 161, Thunderchild First Nation 115X, Ministikwan 161A, Mudie Lake, and Pierceland.

== Major intersections ==
From south to north:

Rural municipality	Location	km	mi	Destinations	Notes
Reno No. 51		0.0	0.0	S-233 south – Havre	Continuation into Montana
Reno No. 51		0.0	0.0	Canada–United States border at Willow Creek Border Crossing	
Reno No. 51	Govenlock	29.2	18.1	Highway 13 west (Red Coat Trail) – Alberta border	South end of Highway 13 concurrency
Reno No. 51	Senate	43.8	27.2	Highway 615 north – Fort Walsh	
Reno No. 51	Consul	56.8	35.3	Range Road 3271	
Reno No. 51		73.1	45.4	Highway 13 east (Red Coat Trail / Ghost Town Trail) – Eastend, Shaunavon	North end of Highway 13 concurrency
Maple Creek No. 111		94.9	59.0	Highway 706 east – Belanger	
Maple Creek No. 111		107.5	66.8	Highway 221 west – Cypress Hills Interprovincial Park (Centre Block)	
Maple Creek No. 111	Maple Creek	134.1	83.3	Highway 271 south – Cypress Hills Interprovincial Park (West Block), Fort Walsh Highway 724 (5th Avenue)	
Maple Creek No. 111		144.4	89.7	Highway 1 (TCH) – Medicine Hat, Swift Current	
Big Stick No. 141		171.2	106.4	Highway 728 west – Golden Prairie	South end of Highway 728 concurrency
Big Stick No. 141		177.7	110.4	Highway 728 east	North end of Highway 728 concurrency
Fox Valley No. 141	Fox Valley	198.0	123.0	Highway 371 west – Richmound	
Happyland No. 231	Liebenthal	221.9	137.9	Highway 321 west – Burstall	
Happyland No. 231		234.9	146.0	Mendham access road	
Happyland No. 231	Leader	247.0	153.5	Highway 32 east – Swift Current	
Happyland No. 231	Leader	247.8	154.0	Highway 741 west – Estuary, Estuary Ferry	
↑ / ↓		256.6	159.4	Crosses the South Saskatchewan River	
Chesterfield No. 261	Eatonia	288.0	179.0	Highway 44 west – Alsask	South end of Highway 44 concurrency
Newcombe No. 260	Glidden	307.2	190.9	Highway 44 east – Eston Highway 649 south – Lemsford Ferry, Lemsford	North end of Highway 44 concurrency
Kindersley No. 290	Kindersley	333.3	207.1	Highway 7 – Alsask, Rosetown	
Oakdale No. 320		359.1	223.1	Highway 307 west – Coleville	
Oakdale No. 320		369.3	229.5	Highway 31 east – Rosetown	South end of Highway 31 concurrency
Progress No. 351	Kerrobert	382.9	237.9	Highway 51 east – Biggar	South end of Highway 51 concurrency
Progress No. 351	Kerrobert	385.3	239.4	Highway 31 west / Highway 51 west – Macklin, Major	North end of Highway 31 / Highway 51 concurrency
Progress No. 351 – Mariposa No. 350 line		402.6	250.2	Highway 771 west – Luseland	South end of Hwy 771 concurrency
↑ / ↓ (Note: Four corners of the Rural Municipalities of Progress No. 351, Mariposa No. 350, Grass Lake No. 381, and Tramping Lake No. 380.)		409.1	254.2	Highway 374 east (Highway 771 east) – Tramping Lake	North end of Hwy 771 concurrency
Grass Lake No. 381 – Tramping Lake No. 380 line	No major junctions				
Round Valley No. 410	Unity	443.2	275.4	Highway 14 – Macklin, Wilkie	
Round Valley No. 410		462.7	287.5	Highway 787	
Cut Knife No. 439		478.8	297.5	Highway 40 east (Poundmaker Trail) – Cut Knife, The Battlefords	South end of Highway 40 concurrency
Hillsdale No. 440		489.0	303.9	Baldwinton access road	
Hillsdale No. 440		494.3	307.1	Highway 40 west (Poundmaker Trail) – Neilburg, Wainwright	North end of Highway 40 concurrency
↑ / ↓		510.8	317.4	Crosses the Battle River	
Eldon No. 471		525.2	326.3	Highway 16 (TCH/YH) west – Lloydminster	South end of Highway 16 concurrency
Eldon No. 471	Maidstone	528.4	328.3	Highway 16 (TCH/YH) east – The Battlefords	North end of Highway 16 concurrency
Eldon No. 471		548.1	340.6	Highway 303 west – Lloydminster	South end of Highway 303 concurrency
↑ / ↓		561.2	348.7	Crosses the North Saskatchewan River	
Frenchman Butte No. 501		563.0	349.8	Highway 303 east – Turtleford	North end of Highway 303 concurrency
Frenchman Butte No. 501		580.3	360.6	Highway 3 east – St. Walburg, Prince Albert	South end of Highway 3 concurrency
Frenchman Butte No. 501	Paradise Hill	591.0	367.2	Highway 3 west – Lloydminster	North end of Highway 3 concurrency
Loon Lake No. 561		648.5	403.0	Highway 699 east – Loon Lake	
↑ / ↓		684.5	425.3	Crosses the Beaver River	
Beaver River No. 622	Pierceland	691.9	429.9	Highway 55 (NWWR) – Cold Lake, Meadow Lake	
Beaver River No. 622	Meadow Lake Provincial Park	714.6	444.0	Highway 919 west / Highway 950 east	Continues as Highway 919
1.000 mi = 1.609 km; 1.000 km = 0.621 mi: Concurrency terminus; Route transition
