= Atton Lake =

Lake in Saskatchewan, Canada

- Location in Saskatchewan Atton Lake (Canada)
- Location: RM of Cut Knife No. 439, Saskatchewan
- Coordinates: 52.8436°N 108.8583°W
- Type: Endorheic lake
- Part of: Saskatchewan River drainage basin
- Primary inflows: Spring fed
- Primary outflows: None
- Basin countries: Canada
- Max. length: 1.6 km (1 mi)
- Max. width: .8 km (0.5 mi)
- Surface area: 122.4 ha (302 acres)
- Max. depth: 5 m (16 ft)
- Shore length^{1}: 4.6 km (2.9 mi)
- Surface elevation: 538 m (1,765 ft)
- Settlements: None
- ^{1} Shore length is not a well-defined measure.

Atton Lake is a spring fed, closed basin lake on the western side of the Canadian province of Saskatchewan. The lake is north-east of the town of Cut Knife, south-east of Paynton, and directly east of Poundmaker Indian reserve in the RM of Cut Knife No. 439. The confluence of Cut Knife Creek and Battle River is to the north-west. Access to the lake and associated park is from Highway 40, east of Cut Knife.

Atton Lake is a shallow lake at about only 5 metres (16 ft) deep. Directly to the east is another shallow Lake, Bushy Lake, and to the west is Wishtikan Lake. The area around the lake is well-treed. Along the southern shore of the lake is Atton's Lake Regional Park which has a campground, beach access, and golf course. Around the southern half of the lake is a cottage subdivision.

== Atton's Lake Regional Park ==
Atton's Lake Regional Park (52.8324°N 108.8585°W) is a regional park located north-east of the town of Cut Knife on the southern shore of Atton Lake. The park features a campground with electric sites, sandy beach, picnic area, ball diamond, 9-hole golf course, and a boat launch. The beach is about 150 metres (490 ft) long with an unsupervised swimming area. In the summer months, Red Cross offers scheduled swimming lessons. On Saturdays and Sundays, no motorised boats are allowed on the lake.

Atton's Lake Regional Park Golf Course opened in 1965 and features a pro shop and licensed club house. It is a 9-hole, par 36, grass-green course totalling 2,832 yards.

== Fish species ==
Fish commonly found in Atton Lake include northern pike and walleye.

== See also ==
- List of lakes of Saskatchewan
- List of protected areas of Saskatchewan
- Tourism in Saskatchewan
