= Poundmaker (disambiguation) =

Poundmaker may refer to:

- poundmaker, one who makes buffalo pounds
- Chief Poundmaker a.k.a. Pitikwahanapiwiyin (1842-1886) Canadian Plains Cree leader
- Poundmaker Cree Nation, Canadian Indian reserve and Treaty 6 First Nation located near Cut Knife, Saskatchewan
- HMCS Poundmaker, Canadian River class frigate of WWII
- Poundmaker Trail, Canadian highway from Edmonton, Alberta to North Battleford, Saskatchewan
- Camp Poundmaker, a camp near Toronto, Ontario, Canada, run by the League for Socialist Action (Canada)
