= Suffixed routes of Saskatchewan Highway 16 =

Highways in Saskatchewan, Canada

Suffixed routes of Highway 16

Highway system
- Provincial highways in Saskatchewan
← Highway 16	→ Highway 17

There are three suffixed routes of Saskatchewan's Highway 16 (the Yellowhead Highway) in the Canadian province of Saskatchewan:

== Highway 16A ==
=== Yorkton ===
Highway 16A
- Location: Yorkton
- Length: 4.4 km (2.7 mi)

The Yorkton segment of Highway 16A is about 5 kilometres (3.1 mi) long. It runs concurrently with Highway 10A along Broadway Street before it leaves the concurrency at Gladstone Avenue N and travels north to York Road.

==== Major intersections ====
From northwest to southeast: The entire route is in Yorkton.

km	mi	Destinations	Notes
0.0	0.0	Highway 16 (TCH) (York Road W) – Saskatoon	Hwy 16A western terminus
2.2	1.4	Gladstone Avenue N	Hwy 16A branches south
2.6	1.6	Broadway Street W (Highway 10A west) / Highway 52 – Melville, Ituna	Hwy 16A follows east; west end of Hwy 10A concurrency
4.4	2.7	Highway 16 (TCH) / Highway 9 / Highway 10 west – Saskatoon, Canora, Whitewood, Winnipeg Broadway Street (Highway 10 east) – Dauphin	Hwy 10A / Hwy 16A eastern terminus
1.000 mi = 1.609 km; 1.000 km = 0.621 mi: Concurrency terminus

=== The Battlefords ===
Highway 16A
- Location: Battleford, North Battleford
- Length: 6.6 km (4.1 mi)
- Existed: 1976–2003

The Battlefords segment of Highway 16A was located in North Battleford and Battleford and was about 6 kilometres (4 mi) long. It existed until c. 2003 when the Battlefords Bridge was twinned along the Highway 4 / Highway 16 / Highway 40 corridor. The original Battleford Bridge via Finlayson Island was closed to vehicular traffic (it remained open to bicycles and pedestrians) and Highway 16A was decommissioned.

==== Major intersections ====
From west to east:

Location	km	mi	Destinations	Notes
Battleford	0.0	0.0	Highway 16 (TCH) / Highway 4 north / Highway 40 east – Lloydminster, North Battleford	Former western terminus; Hwy 16A travelled south; west end of Hwy 4 / Hwy 40 concurrency
Battleford	1.9	1.2	22nd Street (Highway 40 west) to Highway 29 south – Wilkie, Cut Knife Highway 4 south – Biggar, Swift Current	Former Hwy 16A branches east east end of Hwy 4 / Hwy 40 concurrency
Battleford	2.5	1.6	22nd Street / 1st Avenue W	Former Hwy 16A branches north
Battleford	2.7	1.7	1st Avenue W / 24th Street	Former Hwy 16A branches east
Battleford	3.1	1.9	35th Street	
↑ / ↓	3.8– 4.6	2.4– 2.9	Bridge over the North Saskatchewan River and Finlayson Island (closed to vehicular traffic)	
North Battleford	4.9	3.0	Riverside Drive / Poundmaker Trail	Former Hwy 16A branches north
North Battleford	6.6	4.1	Highway 16 (TCH) / Highway 40 – Battleford, Prince Albert, Saskatoon Battleford Road	Former eastern terminus
1.000 mi = 1.609 km; 1.000 km = 0.621 mi: Concurrency terminus

== Highway 16B ==
Highway 16B
- Location: North Battleford
- Length: 3.8 km (2.4 mi)

Highway 16B is a highway in Saskatchewan. It runs from Highway 16 / Highway 40 at North Battleford until Highway 16 / Highway 4 / Highway 40, also at North Battleford. Highway 16B is about 4 km (2 mi.) long, making it one of the shortest provincial-grade highways in the province.

=== Major intersections ===
From east to west: The entire route is in North Battleford.

km	mi	Destinations	Notes
0.0	0.0	Continues as Highway 16 (TCH) east / Highway 40 east – Prince Albert, Saskatoon	
0.0	0.0	Highway 16 (TCH) east / Highway 40 east	Hwy 16B eastern terminus; no direct access Hwy 16/40 east to Hwy 16B west
0.4	0.25	Territorial Drive to Highway 4 north	Bypass route
0.9	0.56	Battleford Road	Eastbound access to Highway 16 (TCH) east / Highway 40 east
2.4	1.5	100th Street (Highway 4 north) / 11th Avenue – Meadow Lake	Hwy 16B branches south; north end of Hwy 4 concurrency
2.8	1.7	Territorial Drive / South Railway Avenue to Highway 4 north	Bypass route
3.8	2.4	Highway 16 (TCH) west / Highway 40 west	Interchange; northbound exit, southbound entrance; Hwy 16B western terminus
3.8	2.4	Continues as Highway 16 (TCH) west / Highway 4 south / Highway 40 west – Battleford, Lloydminster	
1.000 mi = 1.609 km; 1.000 km = 0.621 mi: Concurrency terminus
