= Cut Knife =

Cut Knife may refer to:

- Cut Knife, Saskatchewan, a town in Canada
- Cut Knife (electoral district), a former provincial electoral district in Saskatchewan, Canada
- Rural Municipality of Cut Knife No. 439, a rural municipality in Saskatchewan, Canada
- Cut Knife Airport
- Cut Knife Creek, a river in Saskatchewan
- Battle of Cut Knife, during the North-West Rebellion
