= Highway 17 (Alberta–Saskatchewan) =

Highway in Western Canada

Highway 17

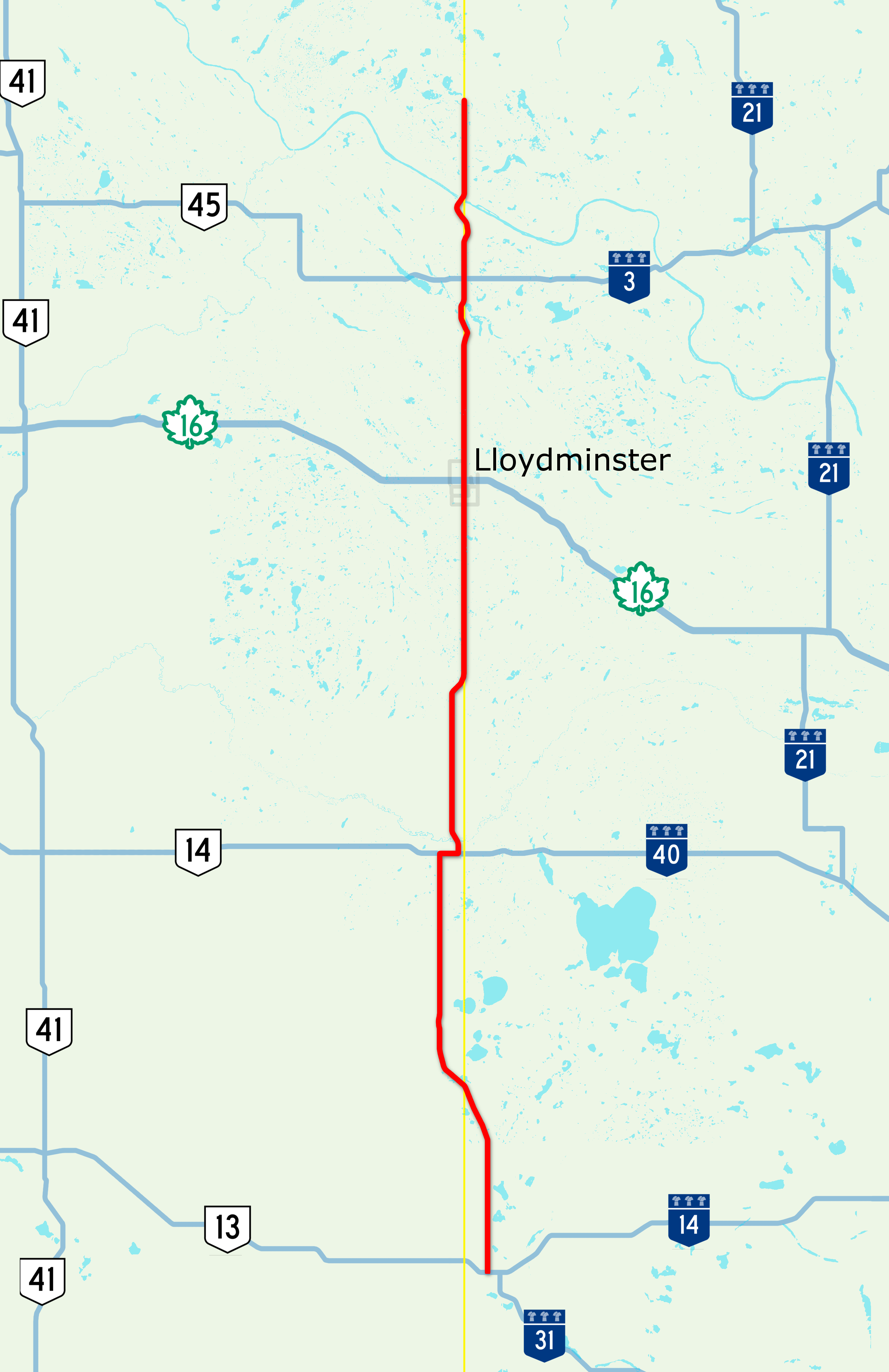
- Highway 17, highlighted in red, straddles the Alberta–Saskatchewan border

Route information
- Length: 158.7 km (98.6 mi)

Major junctions
- South end: SK 14 near Macklin, SK
- AB 14 near Roros, AB; AB 16 / SK 16 in Lloydminster; AB 45 / SK 3 near Alcurve, AB
- North end: AB 641 near Onion Lake, SK

Location
- Country: Canada
- Provinces: Alberta, Saskatchewan
- Major cities: Lloydminster

Highway system
- Alberta Numbered Highway Network; List; Former
- Provincial highways in Saskatchewan
← Highway 16A	→ Highway 18
← Highway 16B	→ Highway 18

Highway 17 is a highway in Canada that straddles and criss-crosses the Alberta–Saskatchewan provincial border. The portion from the provincial border at Dillberry Lake Provincial Park to the provincial border 800 metres (2,600 ft) north of the North Saskatchewan River is designated as Alberta Provincial Highway No. 17 by Alberta Transportation, commonly referred to as Highway 17.

Highway 17 is considered a part of both provincial highway systems. The entire length of the highway is maintained jointly by the respective provincial governments.

== Route description ==
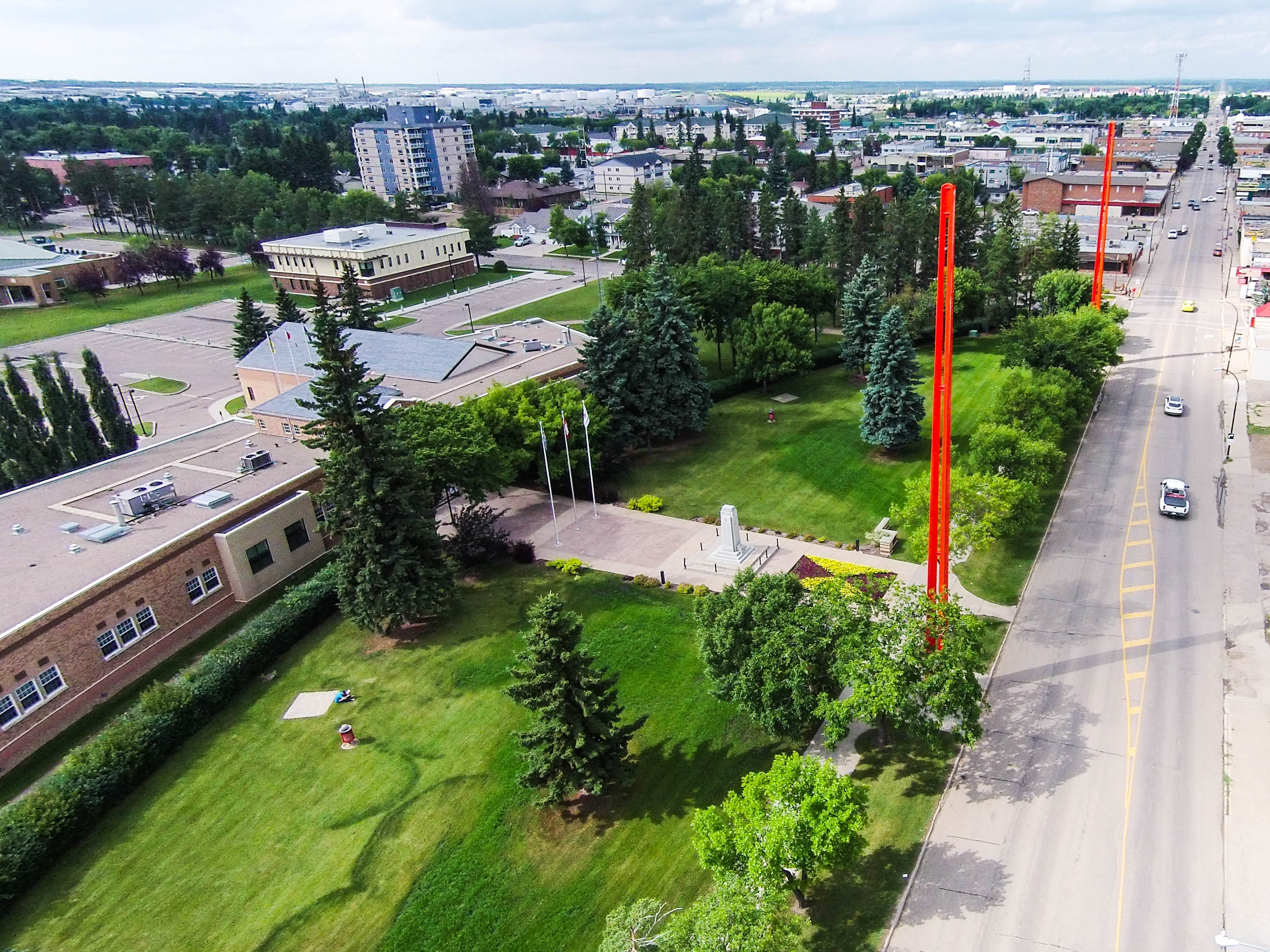
Alberta-Saskatchewan border markers and city hall along Highway 17 (50 Avenue) in Lloydminster

In the south, Highway 17 begins in Saskatchewan at Saskatchewan Highway 14 near Macklin, 3.6 km (2.2 mi) east of Alberta. Saskatchewan Highway 14 is the continuation of Alberta Highway 13.

The highway first enters Alberta before reaching Dillberry Lake Provincial Park. A short distance later, it intersects with Alberta Highway 610 and Saskatchewan Highway 680 before reaching Alberta Highway 14, which becomes Saskatchewan Highway 40. For 2.5 km (1.6 mi), Highway 17 runs east concurrently with Alberta Highway 14. The concurrency ends 0.8 km (0.50 mi) shy of the provincial border.

From Alberta Highway 14 to Lloydminster, Highway 17 crosses the Battle River, passes by the Hamlet of Rivercourse, intersects Saskatchewan Highway 688, and intersects Alberta Highway 619. Its alignment runs concurrently with the provincial border from north of Saskatchewan Highway 688 to north of Saskatchewan Highway 798, crossing the Yellowhead Highway (Highway 16) within Lloydminster.

North of Saskatchewan Highway 798, prior to its intersection with Alberta Highway 45 and Saskatchewan Highway 3, Highway 17 briefly weaves into Saskatchewan and then Alberta before returning to the provincial boundary alignment. Further to the north, prior to crossing the North Saskatchewan River, it weaves back and forth between the two provinces again. After crossing the river, the highway again returns to the provincial boundary alignment and then ends at Onion Lake where it intersects with Alberta Highway 641.

In Lloydminster, Highway 17 runs along the Alberta–Saskatchewan border. It is named 50 Avenue and is historically called Meridian Avenue. Despite Lloydminster's size and 50 Avenue functioning as one of the primary north–south routes in the city, the highway is an undivided two-lane road for most of its course through the city.

== History ==
Highway 17 was originally part of Saskatchewan Highway 21, which ran parallel to the Alberta border between Onion Lake and the South Saskatchewan River west of Empress, Alberta, then turning east to Leader, Saskatchewan, and following its present alignment to Saskatchewan Highway 13 near Robsart. In the 1930s, the section north of Empress was renumbered to Saskatchewan Highway 17; however, the section south of Macklin was decommissioned in the 1940s.

The original alignment of Alberta Highway 17 ran from Highway 16 west of Edmonton to Onoway, but was renumbered to Alberta Highway 43 so the Alberta designation could coincide with Saskatchewan Highway 17.

== Future ==
In 2011, the city of Lloydminster commenced a project to add lanes to Highway 17. Under the project, 50 Avenue will be widened in the southern part of the city. Through downtown, where widening is not feasible, the northbound lanes of Highway 17 will run along 49 Avenue within Saskatchewan, resulting in a couplet or one-way pair of streets.

== Major intersections ==
Province	Rural Municipality	Location	km	mi	Destinations	Notes
Saskatchewan	Eye Hill No. 382	Macklin	0.0	0.0	Highway 14 to Highway 31 – Unity, Kerrobert, Camrose	Signed as SK 17; AB 13 begins 3.6 km (2.2 mi) to the west
Saskatchewan	Senlac No. 411		16.2	10.1	Township Road 410 – Senlac	Former Highway 787 east
↑ / ↓	↑ / ↓		25.2	15.7	Alberta – Saskatchewan border	Cosigned as AB 17 / SK 17
Alberta	M.D. of Wainwright No. 61		27.0	16.8	Dillberry Lake Provincial Park	
Alberta	M.D. of Wainwright No. 61	Butze	40.8	25.4	Highway 610 west – Chauvin, Edgerton	Former Highway 680 east
Alberta	M.D. of Wainwright No. 61		57.0	35.4	Highway 14 west (Poundmaker Trail) – Wainwright	South end of AB 14 concurrency
Alberta	M.D. of Wainwright No. 61		59.4	36.9	Highway 14 east (Poundmaker Trail) to Highway 40 – Cut Knife, The Battlefords	North end of AB 14 concurrency; SK 40 begins 800 m (2,600 ft) to the east
Alberta	↑ / ↓		61.2	38.0	Crosses the Battle River	
Alberta	Vermilion River County	Rivercourse	79.1	49.2	Township Road 470 – Paradise Valley	
Alberta	Vermilion River County		82.9	51.5	Highway 688 east – Lone Rock	
↑ / ↓	↑ / ↓		83.2	51.7	Alberta – Saskatchewan border	
Saskatchewan	Wilton No. 472		95.8	59.5	Highway 619 west – Viking	
Saskatchewan	City of Lloydminster		106.7	66.3	25 Street	Functions as Highway 17 bypass
Saskatchewan	City of Lloydminster		108.8	67.6	Ray Nelson Drive (Highway 16 (TCH/YH)) – Edmonton, The Battlefords, Saskatoon	AB 16 west / SK 16 east
Saskatchewan	City of Lloydminster		112.0	69.6	67 Street	Functions as Highway 17 bypass
Saskatchewan	Britannia No. 502		115.3	71.6	Highway 774 east	
Saskatchewan	Britannia No. 502		125.0	77.7	Highway 798 east	
↑ / ↓	↑ / ↓		129.0	80.2	Alberta – Saskatchewan border	
Alberta	Vermilion River County	No major junctions				
↑ / ↓	↑ / ↓		132.3	82.2	Alberta – Saskatchewan border	
Saskatchewan	Britannia No. 502		135.0	83.9	Highway 45 west / Highway 3 east – Marwayne, Prince Albert	
↑ / ↓	↑ / ↓		142.8	88.7	Alberta – Saskatchewan border	
Alberta	Vermilion River County		145.9	90.7	Crosses the North Saskatchewan River	
↑ / ↓	↑ / ↓		146.6	91.1	Alberta – Saskatchewan border	
Saskatchewan	Frenchman Butte No. 501		148.1	92.0	Highway 797 east – Frenchman Butte	
Saskatchewan	Makaoo 120; Seekaskootch 119	Onion Lake	158.7	98.6	Highway 641 west – Tulliby Lake	
1.000 mi = 1.609 km; 1.000 km = 0.621 mi: Concurrency terminus; Route transition

== See also ==
- Route 54 (Delaware–Maryland), a highway that similarly straddles a state line border in the United States
- State Line Avenue in Texarkana, Texas and Arkansas
