= Saskatchewan Highway 14 =

Provincial highway in Saskatchewan, Canada

Highway 14
- Highway 14 highlighted in red

Route information
- Maintained by Ministry of Highways and Infrastructure & Transport Canada
- Length: 253.2 km (157.3 mi)

Major junctions
- West end: Highway 13 at Alberta border near Macklin
- Highway 17 near Macklin; Highway 31 at Macklin; Highway 21 at Unity; Highway 29 at Wilkie; Highway 4 at Biggar; Highway 7 in Saskatoon; Circle Drive in Saskatoon
- East end: Highway 11 (Idylwyld Drive) in Saskatoon

Location
- Country: Canada
- Province: Saskatchewan
- Major cities: Saskatoon
- Towns: Macklin, Unity, Wilkie, Biggar

Highway system
- Provincial highways in Saskatchewan
← Highway 13	→ Highway 15

Highway 14 is an east–west provincial highway that runs through the central part of the Canadian province of Saskatchewan. It runs from the Alberta border where it becomes Highway 13 to the intersection of Idylwyld Drive (Highway 11) and 22nd Street in Saskatoon. Previously, Highway 14 ran the width of the province but the section east of Saskatoon was renumbered '16' in 1976. Most of the highway is two-laned with only the 6.7-kilometre (4.2 mi) long section in Saskatoon being four. The total length is approximately 253 kilometres (157 mi) long.

Though Highway 14 is one of the three major highways leading from Saskatoon to Alberta, it is less used than Highway 7 or Highway 16 as the other highways provide direct access to Calgary and Edmonton respectively.

Major communities that Highway 14 passes through include Macklin, Unity, Wilke, Biggar, Asquith, and Saskatoon.

== Route description ==
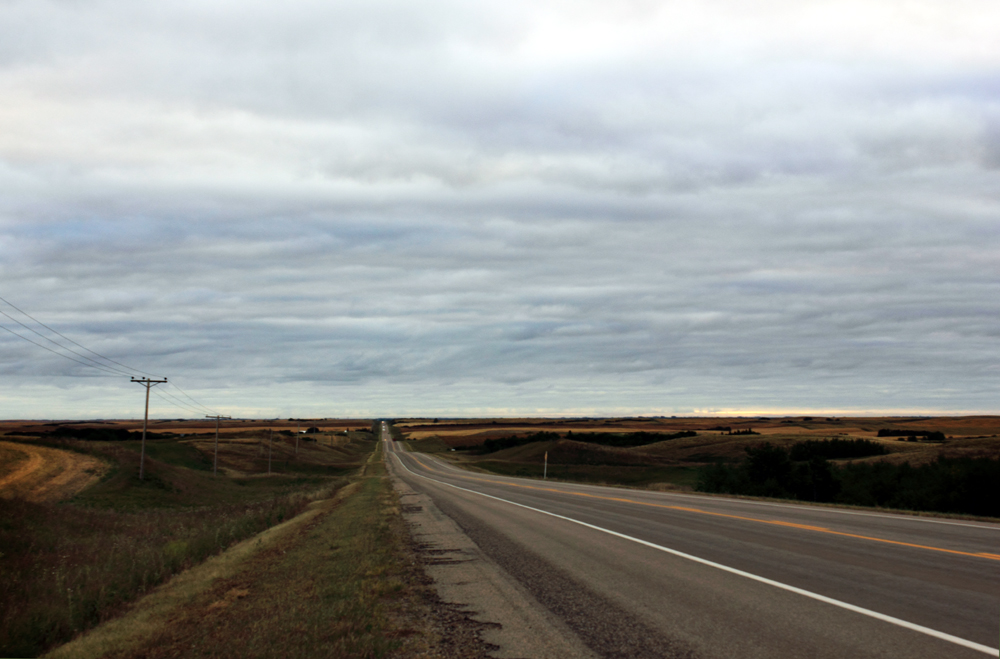
Highway 14 near Unity.

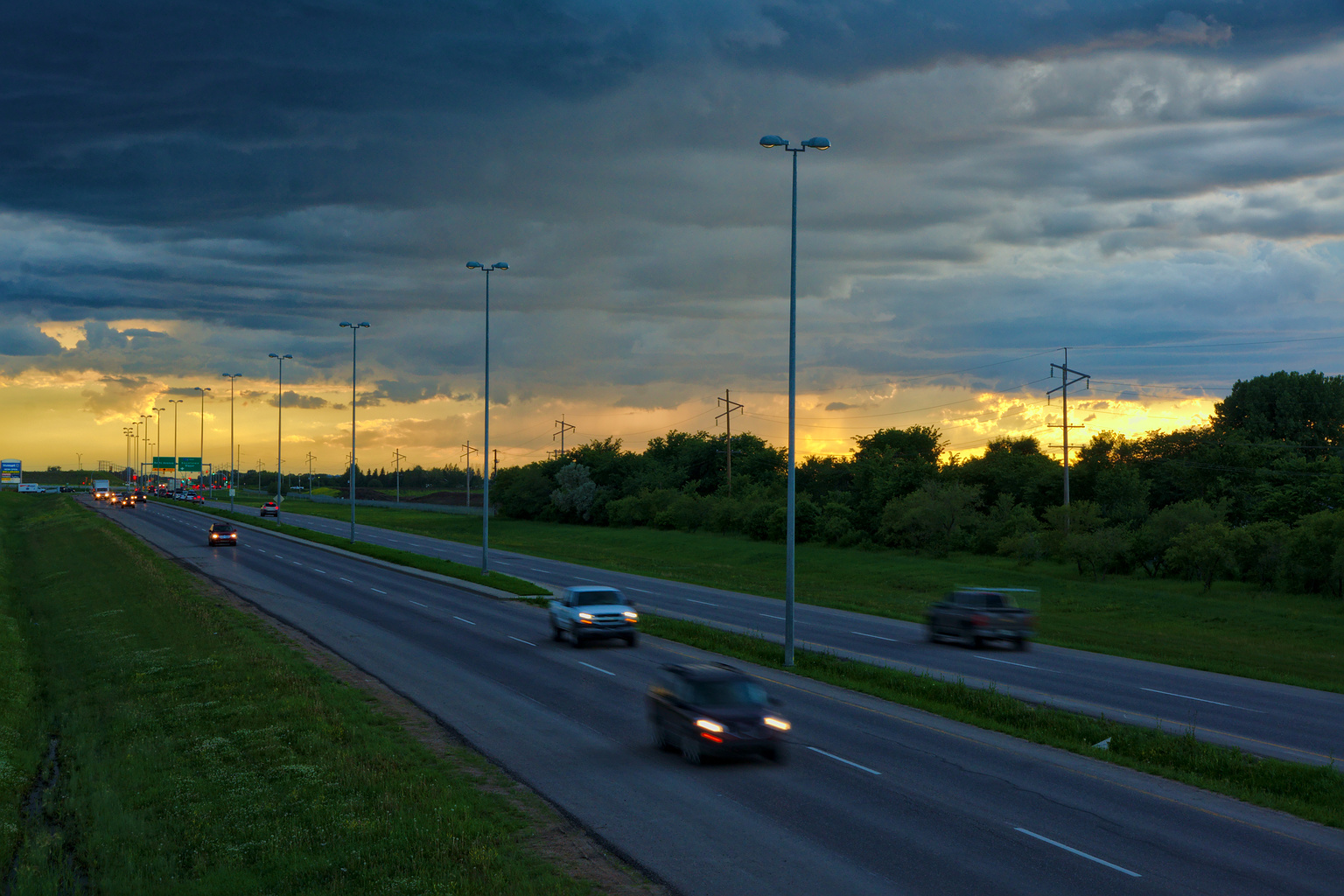
22nd Street (Highway 14) in western Saskatoon

Highway 14 runs from Alberta's Highway 13 at the Saskatchewan–Alberta border near Macklin, Saskatchewan, east to Idylwyld Drive in Downtown Saskatoon.

Beginning at the Alberta border, Highway 14 curves south-east towards Macklin and intersects the north–south Highway 17. At Macklin, Highway 14 has an intersection with the northern terminus of Highway 31 and then curves north-east crossing Eyehill Creek and passing through Evesham. Once past Evesham, Highway 14 turns east and then travels to Unity. At Unity, it intersects Highway 21 and then continues eastward past kikiskitotawânawak iskwêwak Lakes en route to Wilkie. As it approaches Wilkie, it provides access to Wilkie Airport and comes to an intersection with Highways 29's southern terminus. From that point, 14 travels south for about 8 kilometres (5.0 mi) before turning south-east near Reford and then heads towards Biggar. Communities along this stretch include Cavell, Landis, Palo, and Oban.

At Bigger, Highway 14 runs along the northern edge of town and has a 1-kilometre (0.6 mi) long concurrency with the north–south Highway 4. From Biggar, Highway 14 continues east to Saskatoon. Along the way, it provides access to the communities of Perdue, Kinley, Asquith, and Dunfernline. Between Kinley and Asquith, it crosses Eagle Creek.

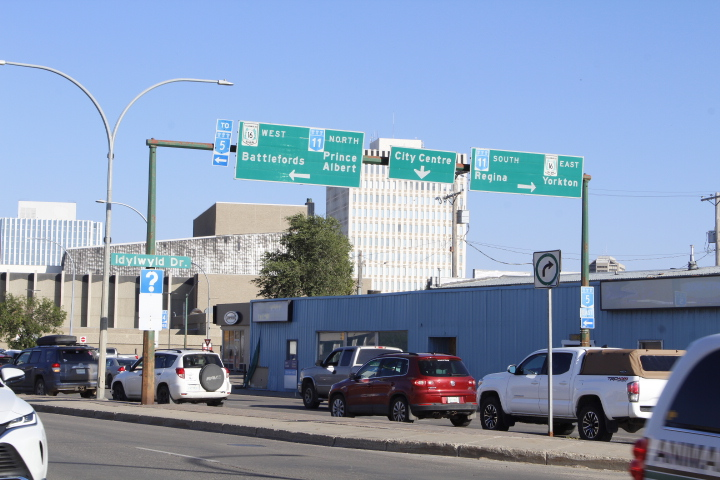
Intersection with Idylwyld Drive.

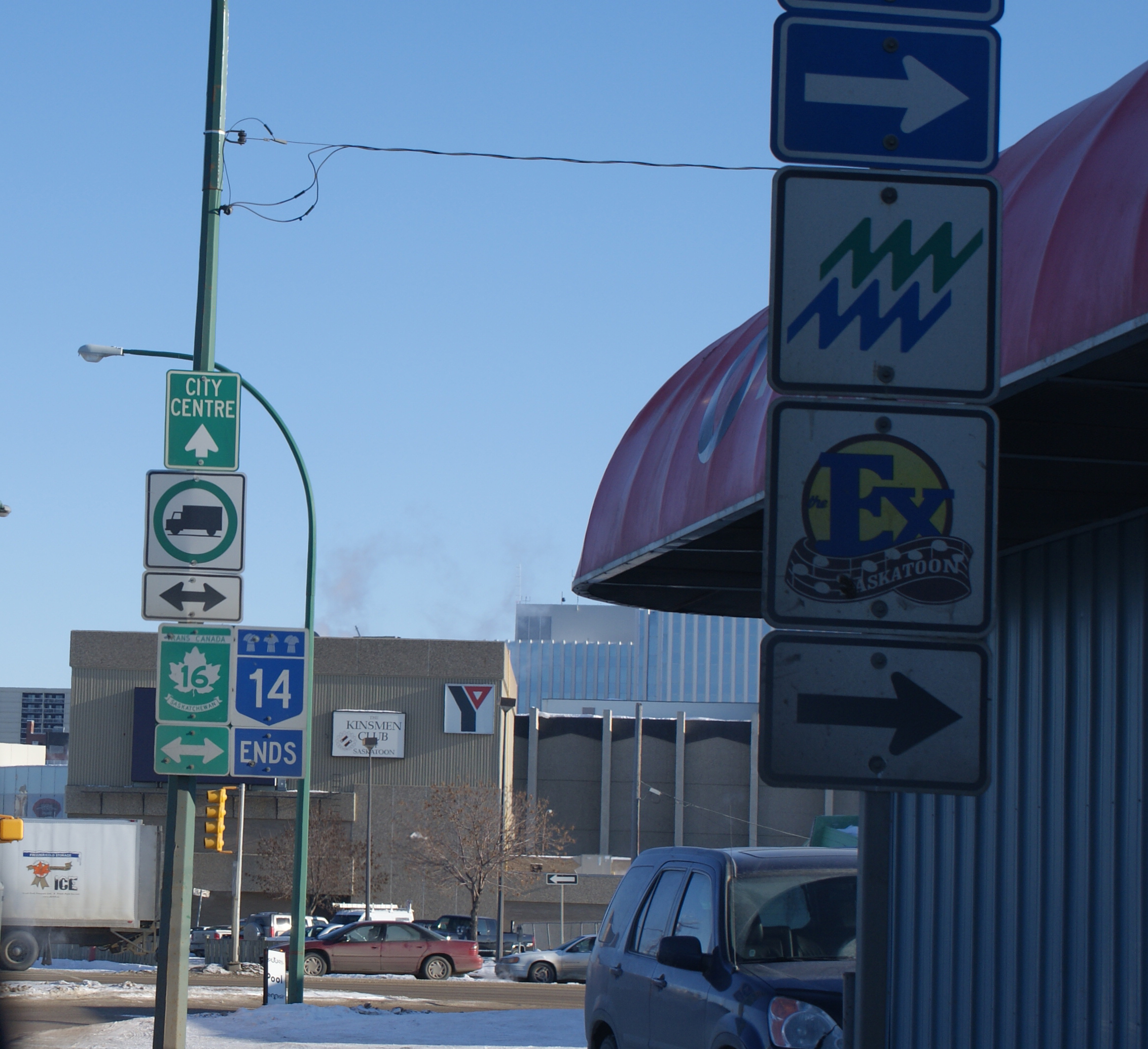
Highway 14 ends signage in Downtown Saskatoon.

As Highway 14 approaches Saskatoon, it enters the Blairmore Sector, is met by the northern terminus of Highway 7, and opens up into a four-lane highway for the remaining 6.7 kilometres (4.2 mi). East of the intersection with Highway 7, Highway 14 enters into at partial cloverleaf interchange at Circle Drive, Saskatoon's ring road. Continuing east from Circle Drive, Highway 14 runs concurrently with 22nd Street W until its eastern terminus at Idylwyld Drive (Highway 11). 22nd Street W continues as 22nd Street E.

== History ==
Prior to 1976, Highway 14 ran the width of the province, continuing east from Saskatoon to the Manitoba border where it transitioned to PTH 4. In 1970, the portion of Highway 14 east of Saskatoon was made part of the Yellowhead Highway along with the section of Highway 5 running west of Saskatoon. Six years later, in 1976, these two sections were re-designated as Highway 16 so that the Yellowhead Highway would carry one number through the four Western provinces (Manitoba would follow suit the next year, redesignating PTH 4 to PTH 16).

== Major intersections ==
From west to east:

Rural municipality	Location	km	mi	Destinations	Notes
Eye Hill No. 382		0.0	0.0	Highway 13 west – Provost, Camrose	Continuation into Alberta
Eye Hill No. 382		3.6	2.2	Highway 17 north – Lloydminster	
Eye Hill No. 382	Macklin	5.2	3.2	Highway 31 south – Kerrobert	
Eye Hill No. 382		18.5	11.5	Senlac Access Road	
Senlac No. 411– Grass Lake No. 381 boundary		27.0	16.8	Highway 680 south – Denzil	
Senlac No. 411– Grass Lake No. 381 boundary		38.5	23.9	Highway 675 north – Neilburg	West end of Highway 675 concurrency
Round Valley No. 410		46.8	29.1	Highway 675 south – Luseland	East end of Highway 675 concurrency
Round Valley No. 410	Unity	62.8	39.0	Highway 21 – Cut Knife, Kerrobert	
Buffalo No. 409– Tramping Lake No. 380 boundary		84.8	52.7	Highway 374 south – Scott	
Buffalo No. 409– Reford No. 379 boundary	Wilkie	92.9	57.7	Highway 29 north – The Battlefords	
Reford No. 379		103.7	64.4	Highway 657 south – Handel	
Reford No. 379	Landis	124.3	77.2	Highway 656 south – Leney, Harris	West end of Highway 656 concurrency
Rosemount No. 378		125.9	78.2	Highway 656 east – Cando	East end of Highway 656 concurrency
Biggar No. 347	Biggar	159.8	99.3	Highway 4 south to Highway 51 west – Rosetown, Kerrobert	West end of Highway 4 concurrency
Biggar No. 347	Biggar	160.8	99.9	Highway 4 north / Main Street – The Battlefords	East end of Highway 4 concurrency
Perdue No. 346	Perdue	191.0	118.7	Highway 655 south – Leney, Harris	West end of Highway 655 concurrency
Perdue No. 346		194.0	120.5	Highway 655 north – Arelee	East end of Highway 655 concurrency
↑ / ↓		210.7	130.9	Highway 376 north – Maymont	
Vanscoy No. 345	Asquith	215.6	134.0	Highway 673 south – Delisle	
Vanscoy No. 345		223.7	139.0	Highway 672 north	West end of Highway 672 concurrency
Vanscoy No. 345		231.8	144.0	Highway 672 south – Grandora, Vanscoy	East end of Highway 672 concurrency
Corman Park No. 344	No major junctions				
City of Saskatoon		246.7	153.3	Highway 7 west / Neault Road (Highway 684 north) – Rosetown, Calgary	West end of Highway 7 concurrency; becomes 22nd Street W
City of Saskatoon		249.8	155.2	Circle Drive to Highway 11 / Highway 16	Interchange; access to Saskatoon International Airport
City of Saskatoon		253.2	157.3	Idylwyld Drive (Highway 11) to Highway 16 / Highway 5 – Prince Albert, Regina, Battlefords, Yorkton 22nd Street E – City Centre	Highway 7 / Highway 14 eastern terminus; 22nd Street continues east
1.000 mi = 1.609 km; 1.000 km = 0.621 mi: Closed/former; Concurrency terminus; Route transition

== See also ==
- Transportation in Saskatchewan
- Roads in Saskatchewan
