= Rockhaven, Saskatchewan =

Rockhaven is a special service area in the Rural Municipality of Cut Knife No. 439, Saskatchewan, Canada. It held village status prior to December 31, 2007. The population was 20 people in 2006. The community is located 56 km west of the City of North Battleford between Highway 40 and Highway 787 southeast of Cut Knife on the Canadian Pacific Railway line.

== Demographics ==
In the 2021 Census of Population conducted by Statistics Canada, Rockhaven had a population of 15 living in 8 of its 11 total private dwellings, a change of 50% from its 2016 population of 10. With a land area of 1.52 km^{2} (0.59 sq mi), it had a population density of 9.9/km^{2} (25.6/sq mi) in 2021.

== See also ==
- List of communities in Saskatchewan
- List of hamlets in Saskatchewan
