= Kilwinning, Saskatchewan =

Community in Saskatchewan, Canada

Coordinates: 53.046°N 106.04°W

Location of Kilwinning in Saskatchewan

Kilwinning is a hamlet in Saskatchewan, Canada. Access is from Highway 40.

The community is named after Kilwinning in North Ayrshire, Scotland, which was the original home of its first postmaster, James Dunlop. It had a post office from 1905 to 1963.

== See also ==
- List of communities in Saskatchewan
