= Neilburg Composite School =

Location
- 410 L.E. Gibbons Centre Street; Neilburg, Saskatchewan, S0M 2C0; Canada; 52.840649°N 109.628191°W

Information
- School type: K-12 School
- School board: Northwest School Division#203
- Principal: Diana Worman
- Grades: K-12
- Enrollment: 163 (September 30, 2016)
- Language: English
- Area: Northwest Saskatchewan
- Colours: Red and Black
- Team name: Trojans
- Website: www.ncstrojans.ca

Neilburg Composite School is a kindergarten to grade 12 public school located in the village of Neilburg, Saskatchewan. Formerly under the jurisdiction of the Battle River School Division, NCS is now administered by the Northwest School Division #203. NCS educates students from the Neilburg, Mardsen, Baldwinton and their surrounding rural areas.

Students from Neilburg Composite School compete in athletics under the jurisdiction of the Saskatchewan High Schools Athletic Association. NCS has produced volleyball teams that constantly appear in provincial championships. Other sports offered by NCS include Cross Country Running, Badminton, and Track & Field.

In recent years the robotics section of NCS has become increasingly popular among the student body. They usually compete with teams around their area.
