= Saskatchewan Highway 40 =

Provincial highway in Saskatchewan, Canada

Highway 40
- Poundmaker Trail
- Highway 40 highlighted in red

Route information
- Maintained by Ministry of Highways and Infrastructure
- Length: 280.5 km (174.3 mi)

Major junctions
- West end: Highway 14 at Alberta border near Marsden
- Highway 21 near Cut Knife; Highway 29 near The Battlefords; Highway 4 / Highway 16 (TCH/YH) at The Battlefords; Highway 340 near Hafford; Highway 12 at Blaine Lake
- East end: Highway 3 near Shellbrook

Location
- Country: Canada
- Province: Saskatchewan
- Rural municipalities: Manitou Lake No. 442, Hillsdale No. 440, Cut Knife No. 439, Battle River No. 438, North Battleford No. 437, Redberry No. 435, Blaine Lake No. 434, Leask No. 464, Shellbrook No. 493
- Major cities: North Battleford
- Towns: Cut Knife, Battleford, Blaine Lake

Highway system
- Provincial highways in Saskatchewan
← Highway 39	→ Highway 41

Highway 40 is a provincial highway in the north-west portion of the Canadian province of Saskatchewan connecting Alberta (where it continues as Highway 14) to Highway 3, four kilometres (2.5 mi) west of Shellbrook. The section of highway between the Alberta border and North Battleford is called the Poundmaker Trail. Poundmaker (c. 1842 – 4 July 1886), also known as Pitikwahanapiwiyin, was a Plains Cree chief known as a peacemaker and defender of his people. This is a primary Saskatchewan highway maintained by the provincial government. The highway is about 280 kilometres (174 mi) long and is entirely paved.

Highway 40 crosses the North Saskatchewan River via the Battlefords Bridge concurrently with Highways 4 and 16. Notable communities along the route include Marsden, Neilburg, Baldwinton, Cut Knife, Sweetgrass First Nation, Battleford (capital city of the NWT from 1876–1883), North Battleford (Battleford and North Battleford are known as The Battlefords), Hafford, Krydor, Blaine Lake, Marcelin, Leask, and Parkside.

== Major attractions ==
Attractions accessible from Highway 40 include:

- North Battleford Court House is on the list of National Historic Sites of Canada as a 1909 symbol of justice in a new province
- North Battleford Airport: The North Battleford Gliding Centre, a Royal Canadian Air Cadet gliding centre, stores its gliders in Hangar IV of the airport, and has an office in the terminal building.
- There is a provincial Point of Interest marker where the highway crosses the Battle River
- Table Mountain Regional Park is a ski area with access from Highway 40
- Fort Battleford National Historic Site
- Cutknife Hill Historic Site
- Chief Poundmaker Historic Centre
- Atton's Lake Regional Park
- Redberry Lake Regional Park

== Major intersections ==
From west to east:

Rural municipality	Location	km	mi	Destinations	Notes
MD of Wainwright No. 61 (Alberta)		−3.2	−2.0	Highway 14 west (Poundmaker Trail) – Wainwright, Edmonton	Continuation into Alberta
MD of Wainwright No. 61 (Alberta)		−3.2	−2.0	Highway 17 south – Macklin	West end of Highway 17 concurrency
MD of Wainwright No. 61 (Alberta)		−0.8	−0.50	Highway 17 north – Lloydminster	East end of Highway 17 concurrency
Manitou Lake No. 442		0.0	0.0	Alberta — Saskatchewan border	AB 14 eastern terminus; SK 40 western terminus
Manitou Lake No. 442		7.2	4.5	Highway 680 south	
Manitou Lake No. 442	Marsden	12.4	7.7		Passes through Marsden
Hillsdale No. 440	Neilburg	25.2	15.7	Highway 675 north – Lashburn	West end of Highway 675 concurrency
Hillsdale No. 440		26.9	16.7	Highway 675 south – Winter, Rutland	East end of Highway 675 concurrency
Hillsdale No. 440		45.1	28.0	Highway 21 north – Maidstone	West end of Highway 21 concurrency
Hillsdale No. 440		50.4	31.3	Baldwinton access road	
Cut Knife No. 439		60.6	37.7	Highway 21 south – Unity	East end of Highway 21 concurrency
Cut Knife No. 439	Cut Knife	68.8	42.8	Highway 674 north – Paynton	
Cut Knife No. 439		78.6	48.8	Rockhaven access road	
Battle River No. 438		101.6	63.1	Highway 689 – Delmas	
Battle River No. 438		115.5	71.8	Highway 29 south – Wilkie	
Battle River No. 438		116.4	72.3	Crosses the Battle River	
Town of Battleford		118.0	73.3	Highway 4 south / 22nd Street – Biggar	West end of Highway 4 concurrency; former Highway 16A east; eastern terminus of Poundmaker Trail
Town of Battleford		119.8	74.4	Highway 16 (TCH/YH) west – Lloydminster, Edmonton	Interchange; west end of Highway 16 concurrency
↑ / ↓		120.5	74.9	Battlefords Bridge over the North Saskatchewan River	
City of North Battleford		121.3	75.4	Highway 4 north / Highway 16B (TCH) east (Business Loop) – Meadow Lake	Interchange; northbound exit and southbound entrance; east end of Highway 4 concurrency
City of North Battleford		123.2	76.6	Battleford Road / Poundmaker Trail	Former Highway 16A west
City of North Battleford		124.1	77.1	Highway 16B (TCH) west (Business Loop) to Highway 4 north – Meadow Lake	At-grade; no eastbound exit
City of North Battleford		124.9	77.6	Highway 16 (TCH/YH) east – Saskatoon	East end of Highway 16 concurrency
North Battleford No. 437		141.9	88.2	Highway 687 south – Denholm	
Douglas No. 436		165.9	103.1	Highway 376 – Mayfair, Richard, Maymont	
Douglas No. 436		175.6	109.1	Speers access road	
Redberry No. 435	Hafford	188.7	117.3	Highway 340 south – Radisson	
Redberry No. 435	Krydor	210.5	130.8		Passes by Krydor
Blaine Lake No. 434	Blaine Lake	224.7	139.6	Highway 12 – Shell Lake, Saskatoon	
Leask No. 464	Marcelin	238.1	147.9	Highway 783 east / Highway 786 west – Muskeg Lake First Nation, Wingard	To Wingard Ferry
Leask No. 464	Leask	248.4	154.3	Highway 792 east	West end of Highway 792 concurrency
Leask No. 464	Leask	249.2	154.8	Highway 792 west	East end of Highway 792 concurrency
Leask No. 464	Parkside	270.9	168.3		
Canwood No. 494– Shellbrook No. 493 boundary		280.5	174.3	Highway 3 to Highway 55 – Spiritwood, Shellbrook, Prince Albert	
1.000 mi = 1.609 km; 1.000 km = 0.621 mi: Concurrency terminus; Incomplete access; Route transition

== See also ==
- Transportation in Saskatchewan
- Roads in Saskatchewan
