= Rural Municipality of Progress No. 351 =

Rural municipality in Saskatchewan, Canada

Progress No. 351
- Rural municipality
- Rural Municipality of Progress No. 351
- Location of the RM of Progress No. 351 in Saskatchewan
- Coordinates: 52.004°N 109.339°W
- Country: Canada
- Province: Saskatchewan
- Census division: 13
- SARM division: 6
- Formed: December 12, 1910

Government
  - Reeve: Kim Herbst
  - Governing body: RM of Progress No. 351 Council
  - Administrator: Kim Adams
  - Office location: Luseland

Area (2016)
  - Land: 802.06 km^{2} (309.68 sq mi)

Population (2016)
  - Total: 268
  - Density: 0.3/km^{2} (0.78/sq mi)
- Time zone: CST
  - Summer (DST): CST
- Area codes: 306 and 639

The Rural Municipality of Progress No. 351 (2016 population: 268) is a rural municipality (RM) in the Canadian province of Saskatchewan within Census Division No. 13 and SARM Division No. 6.

== History ==
The RM of Progress No. 351 incorporated as a rural municipality on December 12, 1910.

== Geography ==
=== Communities and localities ===
The following urban municipalities are surrounded by the RM.

Towns

- Kerrobert
- Luseland

The following unincorporated communities are within the RM.

Localities

- Onward
- Superb

== Demographics ==
Population history (1981–2016)
| Year | Pop. | ±% |
|---|---|---|
| 1981 | 514 | — |
| 1986 | 491 | −4.5% |
| 1991 | 423 | −13.8% |
| 1996 | 377 | −10.9% |
| 2001 | 340 | −9.8% |
| 2006 | 289 | −15.0% |
| 2011 | 260 | −10.0% |
| 2016 | 268 | +3.1% |
Source: Statistics Canada via Saskatchewan Bureau of Statistics

In the 2021 Census of Population conducted by Statistics Canada, the RM of Progress No. 351 had a population of 265 living in 102 of its 119 total private dwellings, a change of −1.1% from its 2016 population of 268. With a land area of 788.45 km^{2} (304.42 sq mi), it had a population density of 0.3/km^{2} (0.9/sq mi) in 2021.

In the 2016 Census of Population, the RM of Progress No. 351 recorded a population of 268 living in 110 of its 135 total private dwellings, a 3.1% change from its 2011 population of 260. With a land area of 802.06 km^{2} (309.68 sq mi), it had a population density of 0.3/km^{2} (0.9/sq mi) in 2016.

== Attractions ==
- Luseland & District Museum

== Government ==
The RM of Progress No. 351 is governed by an elected municipal council and an appointed administrator that meets on the second Wednesday of every month. The reeve of the RM is Gordon Meyer while its administrator is Kim Adams. The RM's office is located in Luseland.

== Transportation ==
- Saskatchewan Highway 21
- Saskatchewan Highway 31
- Saskatchewan Highway 51
- Saskatchewan Highway 675
- Saskatchewan Highway 771
- Canadian Pacific Railway
- Luseland Airport

== See also ==
- List of rural municipalities in Saskatchewan
