= Gallivan, Saskatchewan =

Community in Saskatchewan, Canada

Coordinates: 52.740°N 108.869°W

Gallivan is an unincorporated community in the RM of Cut Knife No. 439, Saskatchewan, Canada. The community is on Range Road 203 (Gallivan Road), about 15 km east of the town of Cut Knife. As of 2011, Gallivan's population was 0. Very little of Gallivan remains. In fact, only the Community Hall and United church still stand.

== See also ==
- List of communities in Saskatchewan
- List of ghost towns in Saskatchewan
- Lists of Canadian tornadoes and tornado outbreaks
