= SARM Division No. 6 =

Division in Saskatchewan, Canada

SARM Division No. 6 is a division of the Saskatchewan Association of Rural Municipalities (SARM) within the Canadian province of Saskatchewan. It is located in the north-west area of the province. There are 48 rural municipalities in this division. The current spot for the Director of Division 6 is Darwin Whitfield.

== List of RMs in SARM Division No. 6 ==
By numerical RM No.

- RM No. 287 St. Andrews
- RM No. 288 Pleasant Valley
- RM No. 290 Kindersley
- RM No. 292 Milton
- RM No. 317 Marriott
- RM No. 318 Mountain View
- RM No. 319 Winslow
- RM No. 320 Oakdale
- RM No. 321 Prairiedale
- RM No. 322 Antelope Park
- RM No. 347 Biggar
- RM No. 349 Grandview
- RM No. 350 Mariposa
- RM No. 351 Progress
- RM No. 352 Heart's Hill
- RM No. 377 Glenside
- RM No. 378 Rosemount
- RM No. 379 Reford
- RM No. 380 Tramping Lake
- RM No. 381 Grass Lake
- RM No. 382 Eye Hill
- RM No. 405 Great Bend
- RM No. 406 Mayfield
- RM No. 409 Buffalo
- RM No. 410 Round Valley
- RM No. 411 Senlac
- RM No. 436 Douglas
- RM No. 437 North Battleford
- RM No. 438 Battle River
- RM No. 439 Cut Knife
- RM No. 440 Hillsdale
- RM No. 442 Manitou Lake
- RM No. 466 Meeting Lake
- RM No. 467 Round Hill
- RM No. 468 Meota
- RM No. 469 Turtle River
- RM No. 470 Paynton
- RM No. 471 Eldon
- RM No. 472 Wilton
- RM No. 496 Spiritwood
- RM No. 497 Medstead
- RM No. 498 Parkdale
- RM No. 499 Mervin
- RM No. 501 Frenchman Butte
- RM No. 502 Brittania
- RM No. 561 Loon Lake
- RM No. 588 Meadow Lake
- RM No. 622 Beaver River

== See also ==
- List of regions of Saskatchewan
- List of census divisions of Saskatchewan
- List of communities in Saskatchewan
- Geography of Saskatchewan
