= Rural Municipality of Hillsdale No. 440 =

Rural municipality in Saskatchewan, Canada

Hillsdale No. 440
- Rural municipality
- Rural Municipality of Hillsdale No. 440
- Location of the RM of Hillsdale No. 440 in Saskatchewan
- Coordinates: 52.809°N 109.464°W
- Country: Canada
- Province: Saskatchewan
- Census division: 13
- SARM division: 6
- Formed: January 1, 1913

Government
  - Reeve: Glenn Goodfellow
  - Governing body: RM of Hillsdale No. 440 Council
  - Administrator: Janet L. Hollingshead
  - Office location: Neilburg

Area (2016)
  - Land: 1,028.72 km^{2} (397.19 sq mi)

Population (2016)
  - Total: 553
  - Density: 0.5/km^{2} (1.3/sq mi)
- Time zone: CST
  - Summer (DST): CST
- Area codes: 306 and 639

The Rural Municipality of Hillsdale No. 440 (2016 population: 553) is a rural municipality (RM) in the Canadian province of Saskatchewan within Census Division No. 13 and SARM Division No. 6.

== History ==
The RM of Hillsdale No. 440 incorporated as a rural municipality on January 1, 1913.

== Geography ==
=== Communities and localities ===
The following urban municipalities are surrounded by the RM.

Villages

- Neilburg

The following unincorporated communities are within the RM.

Localities

- Baldwinton
- Carruthers
- Freemont
- Lilydale

=== Lakes and rivers ===
The following is a list of notable lakes and rivers in the RM:

- Manitou Lake
- Maidstone Lake
- Battle River
- Manitou Lake

== Demographics ==
Population history (1981–2016)
Year	Pop.	±%
1981	713	—
1986	692	−2.9%
1991	610	−11.8%
1996	615	+0.8%
2001	566	−8.0%
2006	530	−6.4%
2011	563	+6.2%
2016	553	−1.8%
Source: Statistics Canada via Saskatchewan Bureau of Statistics

In the 2021 Census of Population conducted by Statistics Canada, the RM of Hillsdale No. 440 had a population of 528 living in 158 of its 181 total private dwellings, a change of −4.5% from its 2016 population of 553. With a land area of 1,014.77 km^{2} (391.80 sq mi), it had a population density of 0.5/km^{2} (1.3/sq mi) in 2021.

In the 2016 Census of Population, the RM of Hillsdale No. 440 recorded a population of 553 living in 162 of its 178 total private dwellings, a −1.8% change from its 2011 population of 563. With a land area of 1,028.72 km^{2} (397.19 sq mi), it had a population density of 0.5/km^{2} (1.4/sq mi) in 2016.

== Government ==
The RM of Hillsdale No. 440 is governed by an elected municipal council and an appointed administrator that meets on the first Thursday after the first Tuesday of every month. The reeve of the RM is Glenn Goodfellow while its administrator is Janet L. Hollingshead. The RM's office is located in Neilburg.

== Transportation ==
The following is a list of Saskatchewan highways in the RM:

- Saskatchewan Highway 21
- Saskatchewan Highway 40
- Saskatchewan Highway 675

== See also ==
- List of rural municipalities in Saskatchewan
