= Poundmaker Trail =

Ceremonial name of a highway in Western Canada

Poundmaker Trail

Route information
- Length: 361 km (224 mi)

Major junctions
- West end: Highway 216 in Edmonton, AB
- East end: Highway 16 in North Battleford, SK

Location
- Country: Canada
- Major cities: Edmonton, North Battleford
- Towns: Tofield, AB; Viking, AB; Wainwright, AB; Cut Knife, SK; Battleford, SK

Highway system

Poundmaker Trail is a 361-kilometre (224 mi) interprovincial highway in Western Canada that runs from Edmonton, Alberta, to North Battleford, Saskatchewan, following Alberta Highway 14 and Saskatchewan Highway 40. The highway is named after Poundmaker (c. 1842–July 4, 1886), also known as Pitikwahanapiwiyin, a Plains Cree chief known as a peacemaker and defender of his people.

The former alignment of Poundmaker Trail followed Saskatchewan Highway 16A through Battleford and across the North Saskatchewan River along original Battlefords Bridge via Finlayson Island. Around 2003, in conjunction with the Battlefords Bridge being twinned along the Highway 4/16/40 corridor, the original bridges were closed to motor vehicles, and Highway 16A was decommissioned.

== Junction list ==
Alberta
Highway 216 southeast of Edmonton
Highway 21 southeast of Sherwood Park
Highway 36 in Viking
Highway 41 in Wainwright
Highway 17 south of Lloydminster
Saskatchewan
Highway 21 east of Cut Knife
Highway 29 east of Battleford
Highway 4 in Battleford

== See also ==
- Yellowhead Highway
