= Table Mountain Regional Park =

Ski area in Saskatchewan, Canada

- Location within Saskatchewan Location within Canada
- Location: RM of Battle River No. 438, Saskatchewan, Canada
- Nearest city: The Battlefords
- Coordinates: 52.8148°N 108.6048°W
- Opened: December
- Closed: March
- Vertical: 100 m (330 ft)
- Top elevation: 600 m (2,000 ft)
- Base elevation: 500 m (1,600 ft)
- Trails: 11
- Longest run: 1,097 m (3,599 ft)
- Total length: 5.9 km (3.7 mi)
- Lift system: 2 quad lifts, 2 magic carpets
- Terrain parks: yes
- Night skiing: yes
- Website: Table Mountain

Table Mountain Regional Park is a ski area and resort in the Canadian province of Saskatchewan about 26 kilometres (16 mi) west of The Battlefords in the Rural Municipality of Battle River No. 438. It is situated on a lateral moraine that was formed during the last ice age and has a scenic view of the Battle River Valley. Table Mountain is a non-profit organization and approximately 70,000 people visit the ski resort each season.

Access to the park is from a gravel road off Highway 40.

== Description ==
Table Mountain Ski Resort has 11 runs, groomed slopes, four lifts, a chalet, a tubing area, and a terrain park for snowboarding. Two of the lifts are quad chair lifts and the other two are magic carpets. Saskatchewan's first quad lift was at Table Mountain. The chalet has a cafeteria with confectionery and hot and cold food. The lounge serves beer and spirits.

== See also ==
- List of ski areas and resorts in Canada
- Tourism in Saskatchewan
