= Parkside, Saskatchewan =

Village in Saskatchewan, Canada

Village of Parkside
- Village
- Location of Parkside in Saskatchewan Village of Parkside (Canada)
- Coordinates: 53.166°N 106.536°W
- Country: Canada
- Province: Saskatchewan
- Census division: 16
- Rural municipality: Leask No. 464
- Post office Founded: N/A
- Incorporated (Village): N/A
- Incorporated (Town): N/A

Government
  - Mayor: David K. Moe
  - Administrator: Gwen Olson
  - Governing body: Parkside Village Council

Area
  - Total: 0.92 km^{2} (0.36 sq mi)

Population (2006)
  - Total: 129
  - Density: 141.5/km^{2} (366/sq mi)
- Time zone: CST
- Postal code: S0J 2A0
- Area code: 306
- Highways: Highway 40

Parkside (2016 population: 121) is a village in the Canadian province of Saskatchewan within the Rural Municipality of Leask No. 464 and Census Division No. 16.

== History ==
Parkside incorporated as a village on February 21, 1913.

== Demographics ==
Population history (1981–2016)
Year	Pop.	±%
1981	104	—
1986	113	+8.7%
1991	127	+12.4%
1996	119	−6.3%
2001	130	+9.2%
2006	129	−0.8%
2011	125	−3.1%
2016	121	−3.2%
Source: Statistics Canada via Saskatchewan Bureau of Statistics

In the 2021 Census of Population conducted by Statistics Canada, Parkside had a population of 132 living in 62 of its 67 total private dwellings, a change of 9.1% from its 2016 population of 121. With a land area of 0.72 km^{2} (0.28 sq mi), it had a population density of 183.3/km^{2} (474.8/sq mi) in 2021.

In the 2016 Census of Population, the Village of Parkside recorded a population of 121 living in 55 of its 72 total private dwellings, a −3.3% change from its 2011 population of 125. With a land area of 0.92 km^{2} (0.36 sq mi), it had a population density of 131.5/km^{2} (340.6/sq mi) in 2016.

== See also ==
- List of communities in Saskatchewan
- List of villages in Saskatchewan
