= Saskatchewan Highway 221 =

Provincial highway in Saskatchewan, Canada

Highway 221

Route information
- Maintained by Ministry of Highways and Infrastructure
- Length: 3.8 km (2.4 mi)

Major junctions
- West end: Cypress Hills Interprovincial Park
- East end: Highway 21 south of Maple Creek

Location
- Country: Canada
- Province: Saskatchewan
- Rural municipalities: Maple Creek

Highway system
- Provincial highways in Saskatchewan
← Highway 220	→ Highway 224

Highway 221 is a provincial highway in the Canadian province of Saskatchewan. Saskatchewan's 200-series highways primarily service its recreational areas. The highway runs from Highway 21 to the Centre Block of Cypress Hills Interprovincial Park. It is about 4 kilometres (2.5 mi) long, and is entirely a paved two-lane highway.

== Major intersections ==
From west to east:

Rural municipality	Location	km	mi	Destinations	Notes
Maple Creek No. 111	Cypress Hills Interprovincial Park	0.0	0.0	Cypress Hills Interprovincial Park (Centre Block) main gate	Western terminus; road continues west into park as Ben Voirlick Drive
Maple Creek No. 111		3.8	2.4	Highway 21 – Maple Creek, Consul	Eastern terminus
1.000 mi = 1.609 km; 1.000 km = 0.621 mi

== See also ==
- Transportation in Saskatchewan
- Roads in Saskatchewan
