= Baldwinton =

Unincorporated community in Saskatchewan, Canada,

- Unincorporated community
- Location within Saskatchewan
- Coordinates: 52°47′N 109°16′W
- Country: Canada
- Province: Saskatchewan
- Region: Mid-west
- Census division: 13
- Rural Municipality: Reno

Government
  - Governing body: Hilldale No. 440
  - Reeve: Glen Goodfellow
  - Administrator: Janet L. Black

Population (2021)
  - Total: 158 usually populated dwellings
- Time zone: CST
- Postal code: S0M 0B0
- Area code: 306
- Highways: Highway 40
- Railways: Canadian Pacific Railway
- Website: https://rmofhillsdale.com

Baldwinton is an unincorporated community in Hillsdale Rural Municipality No. 440, Saskatchewan, Canada. The community is located along Highway 40 approximately 50 km north of the Town of Unity.

== See also ==
- List of communities in Saskatchewan
