= Rural Municipality of Round Valley No. 410 =

Rural municipality in Saskatchewan, Canada

Round Valley No. 410
- Rural municipality
- Rural Municipality of Round Valley No. 410
- Location of the RM of Round Valley No. 410 in Saskatchewan
- Coordinates: 52.508°N 109.220°W
- Country: Canada
- Province: Saskatchewan
- Census division: 13
- SARM division: 6
- Formed: December 13, 1909

Government
  - Reeve: Brad Ireland
  - Governing body: RM of Round Valley No. 410 Council
  - Administrator: Rhonda Brandle
  - Office location: Unity

Area (2016)
  - Land: 810.57 km^{2} (312.96 sq mi)

Population (2016)
  - Total: 423
  - Density: 0.5/km^{2} (1.3/sq mi)
- Time zone: CST
  - Summer (DST): CST
- Area codes: 306 and 639

The Rural Municipality of Round Valley No. 410 (2016 population: 423) is a rural municipality (RM) in the Canadian province of Saskatchewan within Census Division No. 13 and SARM Division No. 6.

== History ==
The RM of Round Valley No. 410 incorporated as a rural municipality on December 13, 1909.

== Geography ==
=== Communities and localities ===
The following urban municipalities are surrounded by the RM.

Towns

- Unity

The following unincorporated communities are within the RM.

Localities

- Adanac (dissolved as a village)
- Buccleugh
- Poyser
- Swinburne
- Unity Station

== Demographics ==
Population history (1981–2016)
Year	Pop.	±%
1981	600	—
1986	554	−7.7%
1991	517	−6.7%
1996	474	−8.3%
2001	421	−11.2%
2006	355	−15.7%
2011	361	+1.7%
2016	423	+17.2%
Source: Statistics Canada via Saskatchewan Bureau of Statistics

In the 2021 Census of Population conducted by Statistics Canada, the RM of Round Valley No. 410 had a population of 384 living in 144 of its 159 total private dwellings, a change of −9.2% from its 2016 population of 423. With a land area of 795.72 km^{2} (307.23 sq mi), it had a population density of 0.5/km^{2} (1.2/sq mi) in 2021.

In the 2016 Census of Population, the RM of Round Valley No. 410 recorded a population of 423 living in 164 of its 176 total private dwellings, a 17.2% change from its 2011 population of 361. With a land area of 810.57 km^{2} (312.96 sq mi), it had a population density of 0.5/km^{2} (1.4/sq mi) in 2016.

== Attractions ==
- Unity & District Heritage Museum
- Unity & District Regional Park

== Government ==
The RM of Round Valley No. 410 is governed by an elected municipal council and an appointed administrator that meets on the second Tuesday of every month. The reeve of the RM is Brad Ireland while its administrator is Rhonda Brandle. The RM's office is located in Unity.

== Transportation ==
- Saskatchewan Highway 14
- Saskatchewan Highway 21
- Saskatchewan Highway 787
- Unity Aerodrome
- Canadian National Railway
- Canadian Pacific Railway

== See also ==
- List of rural municipalities in Saskatchewan
