= Rural Municipality of Britannia No. 502 =

Rural municipality in Saskatchewan, Canada

Britannia No. 502
- Rural municipality
- Rural Municipality of Britannia No. 502

- Location of the RM of Britannia No. 502 in Saskatchewan
- Coordinates: 53.505°N 109.698°W
- Country: Canada
- Province: Saskatchewan
- Census division: 17
- SARM division: 6
- Formed: December 13, 1909

Government
  - Reeve: John Light
  - Governing body: RM of Britannia No. 502 Council
  - Administrator: Bryson Leganchuk
  - Office location: Lloydminster

Area (2016)
  - Land: 950.39 km^{2} (366.95 sq mi)

Population (2016)
  - Total: 2,153
  - Density: 2.3/km^{2} (6.0/sq mi)
- Time zone: MST
  - Summer (DST): MST
- Area codes: 306 and 639
- Website: Official website

The Rural Municipality of Britannia No. 502 (2016 population: 2,153) is a rural municipality (RM) in the Canadian province of Saskatchewan within Census Division No. 17 and SARM Division No. 6. It is located in the west-central portion of the province.

== History ==
The RM of Britannia No. 502 incorporated as a rural municipality on December 13, 1909.

== Geography ==
The RM of Britannia No. 502 is bounded by the Saskatchewan-Alberta border/Highway 17 to the west and the North Saskatchewan River to the north. Adjacent municipalities include the City of Lloydminster to the southwest, the County of Vermilion River in Alberta to the west, the RM of Frenchman Butte No. 501 to the north, the RM of Eldon No. 471 to the east and the RM of Wilton No. 472 to the south.

=== Communities and localities ===
The following unincorporated communities are within the RM.

Localities

- Ashley
- Greenstreet
- Hewitt Landing
- Hillmond
- Landrose
- Northminster
- Rex
- Tangleflags

== Demographics ==
Population history (1981–2016)
Year	Pop.	±%
1981	1,375	—
1986	1,453	+5.7%
1991	1,332	−8.3%
1996	1,358	+2.0%
2001	1,382	+1.8%
2006	1,501	+8.6%
2011	1,734	+15.5%
2016	2,153	+24.2%
Source: Statistics Canada via Saskatchewan Bureau of Statistics

In the 2021 Census of Population conducted by Statistics Canada, the RM of Britannia No. 502 had a population of 2,061 living in 744 of its 848 total private dwellings, a change of −4.3% from its 2016 population of 2,153. With a land area of 915.11 km^{2} (353.33 sq mi), it had a population density of 2.3/km^{2} (5.8/sq mi) in 2021.

In the 2016 Census of Population, the RM of Britannia No. 502 recorded a population of 2,153 living in 744 of its 836 total private dwellings, a 24.2% change from its 2011 population of 1,734. With a land area of 950.39 km^{2} (366.95 sq mi), it had a population density of 2.3/km^{2} (5.9/sq mi) in 2016.

== Sandy Beach Regional Park ==
Sandy Beach Regional Park (53.4501°N 109.9925°W) is a regional park in the RM on the southern and eastern shores of Sandybeach Lake. The park, which was founded in 1966, is about 19 kilometres (12 mi) north of Lloydminster near the border with Alberta. Access is from Highway 17.

Amenities at Sandy Beach Regional Park include a campground, golf course, boat launch, beach area, ball diamond, concession, and a washrooms / shower facility.

The golf course is a 9-hole course with grass greens. It is a par 35 with 3,099 total yards. There is also a 3-hole practice facility and a clubhouse with rentals.

== Government ==
The RM of Britannia No. 502 is governed by an elected municipal council and an appointed administrator that meets every third Wednesday. The reeve of the RM is John Light while its administrator is Bryson Leganchuk. The RM's office is located north of Lloydminster, on RR 3281, south of TWP RD 504.
