= Poundmaker 114 =

Indian reserve in Saskatchewan, Canada

Coordinates: 52°51′11″N 108°56′57″W

- Indian reserve
- Poundmaker Indian Reserve No. 114
- Location in Saskatchewan
- First Nation: Poundmaker
- Country: Canada
- Province: Saskatchewan

Area
  - Total: 8,493.8 ha (20,989 acres)

Population (2016)
  - Total: 547
  - Density: 6.44/km^{2} (16.7/sq mi)
- Community Well-Being Index: 53

Poundmaker 114 is an Indian reserve of the Poundmaker Cree Nation in Saskatchewan. It is about 40 kilometres (25 mi) west of North Battleford. In the 2016 Canadian Census, it recorded a population of 547 living in 176 of its 201 total private dwellings. In the same year, its Community Well-Being index was calculated at 53 of 100, compared to 58.4 for the average First Nations community and 77.5 for the average non-Indigenous community.

It contains or is near to Cut Knife Creek and Cut Knife Hill, the site of a 1885 battle between government troops and Poundmaker's people.

== See also ==
- List of Indian reserves in Saskatchewan
