= Division No. 13, Saskatchewan =

Census division in Canada

Coordinates: 51°28′00″N 109°09′21″W

Division No. 13
- Census division in Saskatchewan
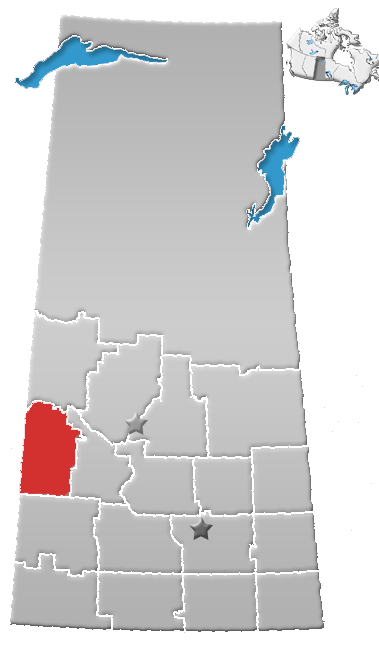
- Country: Canada
- Province: Saskatchewan

Area
  - Total: 17,258.71 km^{2} (6,663.63 sq mi)
- As of 2016

Population (2016)
  - Total: 23,224
  - Density: 1.3456/km^{2} (3.4852/sq mi)

Division No. 13 is one of eighteen census divisions in the province of Saskatchewan, Canada, as defined by Statistics Canada. It is located in the western part of the province, bordering Alberta. The most populous community in this division is Kindersley.

== Demographics ==
In the 2021 Census of Population conducted by Statistics Canada, Division No. 13 had a population of 22,047 living in 8,740 of its 10,295 total private dwellings, a change of −5.1% from its 2016 population of 23,224. With a land area of 17,182.12 km^{2} (6,634.05 sq mi), it had a population density of 1.3/km^{2} (3.3/sq mi) in 2021.

Knowledge of languages in Division No. 13 (1991−2021)
Language	2021		2011		2001		1991	
Language	Pop.	%	Pop.	%	Pop.	%	Pop.	%
English	20,695	99.78%	22,710	99.69%	23,765	99.96%	25,025	99.76%
Tagalog	515	2.48%	115	0.5%	20	0.08%	25	0.1%
Cree (Note: Combined responses of the Cree-Innu languages, previously categorized under "Cree" in past censuses.)	510	2.46%	565	2.48%	615	2.59%	480	1.91%
German (Note: Combined responses of the High German languages, including Standard German, Pennsylvania German, Swiss German, and Yiddish.)	445	2.15%	1,270	5.58%	1,720	7.23%	2,335	9.31%
French	305	1.47%	325	1.43%	525	2.21%	460	1.83%
Spanish	125	0.6%	20	0.09%	45	0.19%	25	0.1%
Hindustani (Note: Combined responses of Hindi and Urdu as they form mutually intelligible registers of the Hindustani language.)	95	0.46%	10	0.04%	0	0%	20	0.08%
Punjabi	55	0.27%	40	0.18%	0	0%	25	0.1%
Ukrainian	45	0.22%	100	0.44%	180	0.76%	210	0.84%
Arabic	30	0.14%	10	0.04%	35	0.15%	0	0%
Chinese (Note: Combined responses of the Chinese languages, including Mandarin, Cantonese, Min Nan, Hakka, Wu (Shanghainese), Min Dong, Chinese, n.o.s., and Chinese languages, n.i.e..)	20	0.1%	70	0.31%	55	0.23%	70	0.28%
Dutch	15	0.07%	30	0.13%	85	0.36%	35	0.14%
Polish	15	0.07%	20	0.09%	70	0.29%	95	0.38%
Portuguese	15	0.07%	5	0.02%	0	0%	0	0%
Italian	10	0.05%	10	0.04%	30	0.13%	25	0.1%
Hungarian	10	0.05%	5	0.02%	0	0%	25	0.1%
Russian	0	0%	5	0.02%	10	0.04%	10	0.04%
Vietnamese	0	0%	5	0.02%	0	0%	0	0%
Greek	0	0%	0	0%	10	0.04%	0	0%
Total responses	20,740	94.07%	22,780	98.66%	23,775	98.84%	25,085	98.81%
Total population	22,047	100%	23,089	100%	24,054	100%	25,388	100%

== Census subdivisions ==
The following census subdivisions (municipalities or municipal equivalents) are located within Saskatchewan's Division No. 13.

=== Towns ===
- Cut Knife
- Kerrobert
- Kindersley
- Luseland
- Macklin
- Scott
- Unity
- Wilkie

=== Villages ===
- Brock
- Coleville
- Denzil
- Dodsland
- Flaxcombe
- Landis
- Major
- Marengo
- Marsden
- Neilburg
- Netherhill
- Plenty
- Ruthilda
- Senlac
- Smiley
- Tramping Lake

=== Rural municipalities ===
- RM No. 290 Kindersley
- RM No. 292 Milton
- RM No. 319 Winslow
- RM No. 320 Oakdale
- RM No. 321 Prairiedale
- RM No. 322 Antelope Park
- RM No. 349 Grandview
- RM No. 350 Mariposa
- RM No. 351 Progress
- RM No. 352 Heart's Hill
- RM No. 379 Reford
- RM No. 380 Tramping Lake
- RM No. 381 Grass Lake
- RM No. 382 Eye Hill
- RM No. 409 Buffalo
- RM No. 410 Round Valley
- RM No. 411 Senlac
- RM No. 439 Cut Knife
- RM No. 440 Hillsdale
- RM No. 442 Manitou Lake

=== Indian reserves ===
- Indian Reserve - Little Pine 116
- Indian Reserve - Poundmaker 114

== See also ==
- List of census divisions of Saskatchewan
- List of communities in Saskatchewan
