= Rural Municipality of Manitou Lake No. 442 =

Rural municipality in Saskatchewan, Canada

Manitou Lake No. 442
- Rural municipality
- Rural Municipality of Manitou Lake No. 442
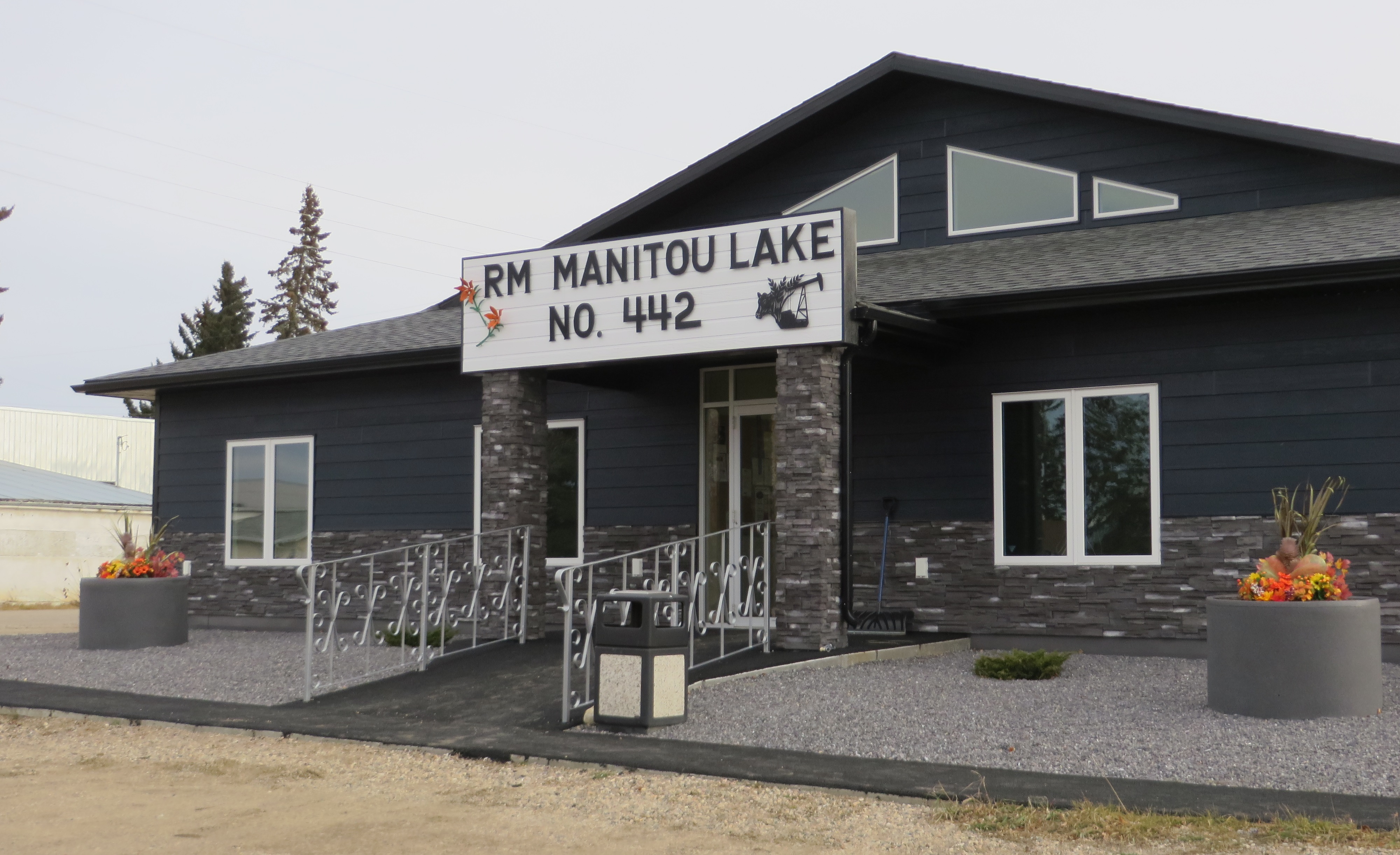
- RM's office in Marsden

- Location of the RM of Manitou Lake No. 442 in Saskatchewan
- Coordinates: 52.885°N 109.768°W
- Country: Canada
- Province: Saskatchewan
- Census division: 13
- SARM division: 6
- Federal riding: Battlefords—Lloydminster
- Provincial riding: Cut Knife-Turtleford
- Formed: December 12, 1910

Government
  - Reeve: Brian Graham
  - Governing body: RM of Manitou Lake No. 442 Council
  - Administrator: Joanne Loy
  - Office location: Marsden

Area (2016)
  - Land: 850.95 km^{2} (328.55 sq mi)

Population (2016)
  - Total: 573
  - Density: 0.7/km^{2} (1.8/sq mi)
- Time zone: CST
  - Summer (DST): CST
- Postal code: S0M 1P0
- Area codes: 306 and 639
- Website: Official website

The Rural Municipality of Manitou Lake No. 442 (2016 population: 573) is a rural municipality (RM) in the Canadian province of Saskatchewan within Census Division No. 13 and SARM Division No. 6.

== History ==
The RM of Manitou Lake No. 442 incorporated as a rural municipality on December 12, 1910. It takes its name from Manitou Lake, which is Algonquian for "mysterious being".

In 1905, the first settlers came from Canadian regions, the British Isles, and the United States. The area was known as the Manitou Lake District. In 1907-1908 a post office was established in the home of Mr. Alex Wright, approximately one mile north-east of the present Marsden town site. The post office served the surrounding rural area. The Wrights named the post office 'Marsden'. One story recounts the name as originating from the birthplace of Mrs. Wright in Yorkshire, England; another reports it was named after the famous Marsden Rock near Newcastle, England. The adjacent area became known as the Marsden Rural Post Office District. Between 1919 and 1922, the post office was relocated one mile south to the RM office of Manitou Lake No. 442.

In 1905, the vast prairie land was covered with long grass referred to as 'prairie wool'. There were few trees or bluffs. The fertile black soil attracted many first settlers to the area and soon farms developed with sod and log homes. Farmers turned sod with horse and ox teams, sometimes using a walking plough (sulky) to prepare the ground for grain sowing. Grain was cut with binders, stooked, and threshed. Farmers hauled grain by wagon or horse-drawn sleigh to Zumbro and Artland. In the winter months, grain was hauled across the ice of Manitou Lake. Early settlers purchased groceries and supplies at Lashburn, Artland, or Chauvin, Alberta. A popular shopping method of the time was the Eaton's catalogue.

The settler's children first attended school in Learig, and in 1925 a four-room schoolhouse was built in the hamlet of Marsden.

== Geography ==
=== Communities and localities ===
The following urban municipalities are surrounded by the RM.

Villages

- Marsden

The following unincorporated communities are within the RM.

Localities

- Artland
- Unwin

=== Lakes and rivers ===
The following is a list of notable lakes and rivers in the RM:

- Manitou Lake
- Wells Lake
- Reflex Lakes
- Battle River
- Eyehill Creek

== Demographics ==
Population history (1981–2016)
| Year | Pop. | ±% |
|---|---|---|
| 1981 | 687 | — |
| 1986 | 727 | +5.8% |
| 1991 | 631 | −13.2% |
| 1996 | 618 | −2.1% |
| 2001 | 604 | −2.3% |
| 2006 | 590 | −2.3% |
| 2011 | 547 | −7.3% |
| 2016 | 573 | +4.8% |
Source: Statistics Canada via Saskatchewan Bureau of Statistics

In the 2021 Census of Population conducted by Statistics Canada, the RM of Manitou Lake No. 442 had a population of 505 living in 199 of its 250 total private dwellings, a change of −11.9% from its 2016 population of 573. With a land area of 839.29 km^{2} (324.05 sq mi), it had a population density of 0.6/km^{2} (1.6/sq mi) in 2021.

In the 2016 Census of Population, the RM of Manitou Lake No. 442 recorded a population of 573 living in 209 of its 236 total private dwellings, a 4.8% change from its 2011 population of 547. With a land area of 850.95 km^{2} (328.55 sq mi), it had a population density of 0.7/km^{2} (1.7/sq mi) in 2016.

== Economy ==
Agriculture, cattle, and oil are primary industries for the population of 590 residents of the RM of Manitou Lake. Wheat, canola, barley, oats, peas, and flax are typical crops in the area. The region is famous for its prize-winning purebred cattle that include Hereford, Charolais, Simmental, and Angus. Agriculture diversification is noticeable with specialty livestock production such as elk and bison.

The oil industry plays a significant role in the local economy. Oil wells and batteries in the countryside evidence heavy crude oil extraction in the region.

=== Transportation ===
The following is a list of Saskatchewan highways in the RM:

- Saskatchewan Highway 40
- Saskatchewan Highway 675
- Saskatchewan Highway 680

== Big Manitou Regional Park ==
Big Manitou Regional Park (52.7967°N 109.7886°W) is a regional park located on the north-west corner of Manitou Lake, near where the creek that drains Wells Lake flows into Manitou Lake. This park was originally established in 1975 as a part of Suffern Lake Regional Park. In 2019, it was granted full park status and officially named Big Manitou Regional Park It is located about 6.4 kilometres (4.0 mi) south and east of Marsden. The park facilities include a campground with 32 campsites, showers, cookhouse, playgrounds, horseshoe pits, ball diamonds, and a soccer field. Manitou Lake Golf Club is also located in the park. It is a 9-hole, sand greens course.

== Manitou Sand Hills ==
Manitou Sand Hills are 105,000 acres of Crown grazing land set aside by the Saskatchewan government that surround much of the southern half of Manitou Lake in the southern portion of the RM. There is camping and guided trail rides through the Manitou Sand Hills, which are one of Western Canada's most distinctive landscapes.

== Government ==
The RM of Manitou Lake No. 442 is governed by an elected municipal council and an appointed administrator that meets on the first Thursday after the first Tuesday of every month. The reeve of the RM is Brian Graham while its administrator is Joanne Loy. The RM's office is located in Marsden.

== See also ==
- List of rural municipalities in Saskatchewan
- List of communities in Saskatchewan
- List of protected areas of Saskatchewan
