= Neilburg =

Village in Saskatchewan, Canada

Village of Neilburg
- Village
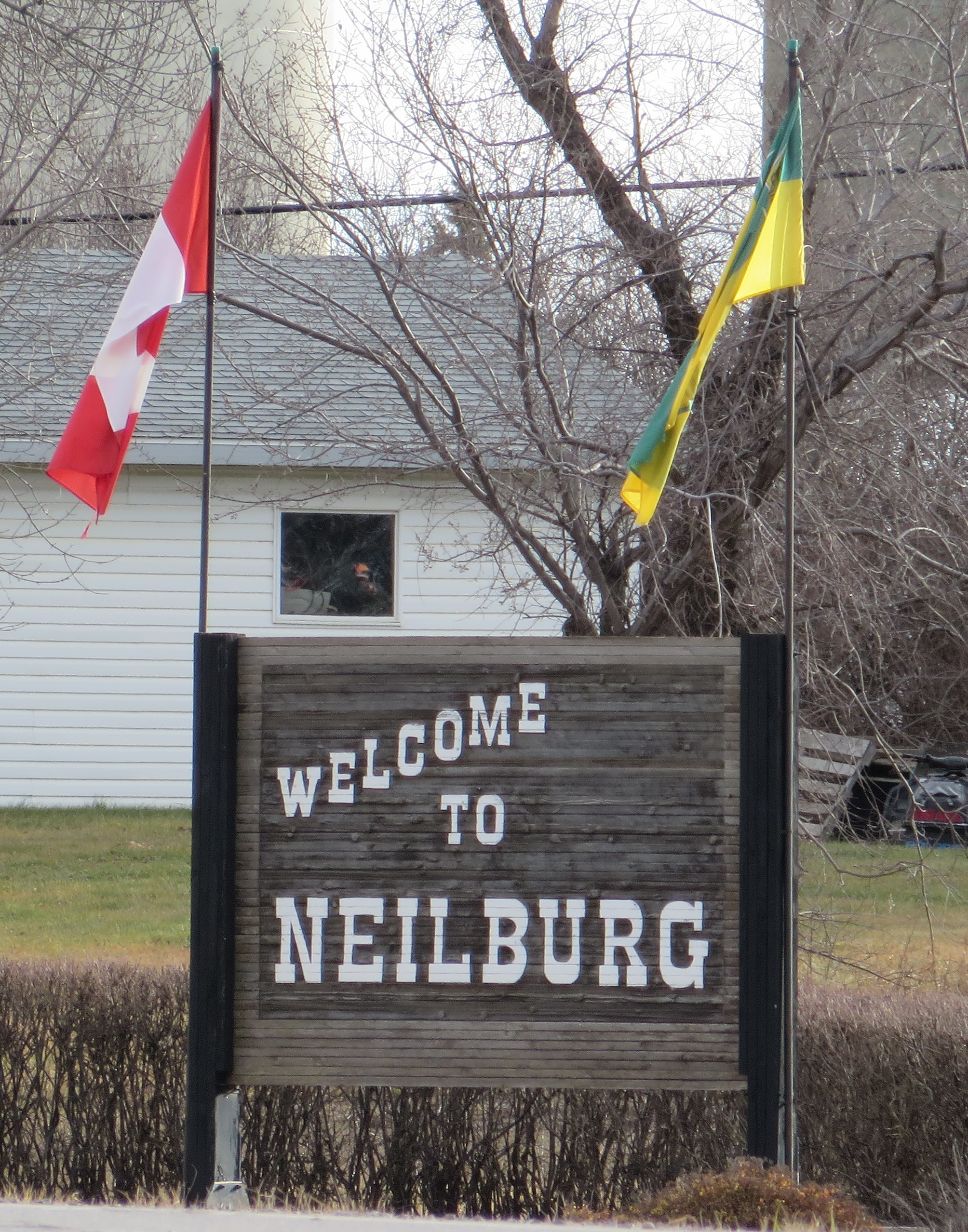
- Village sign

- Location within Saskatchewan
- Coordinates: 52.833°N 109.633°W
- Country: Canada
- Province: Saskatchewan
- Region: Saskatchewan
- Census division: 13
- Rural Municipality: Hillsdale No. 440
- School Division: Northwest School Division No. 203
- Post office Founded: N/A
- Incorporated (Hamlet): 1923
- Incorporated (Village): 1946

Government
  - Mayor: Brent Wiens
  - Deputy Mayor: Aaron Gibbons
  - Governing body: Neilburg Village Council
- Elevation: 677 m (2,221 ft)

Population (2016)
  - Total: 379
- Time zone: UTC−7 (MST)
  - Summer (DST): UTC−6 (MDT)
- Postal code: S0M 2C0
- Area code: 306
- Highways: Highway 40
- Website: www.neilburg.ca

Neilburg (2016 population: 379) is a village in the Canadian province of Saskatchewan within the Rural Municipality of Hillsdale No. 440 and Census Division No. 13. A grade K–12 school is located in the village that services the Neilburg area as well as grade 7–12 students from Marsden.

Neilburg was named after an early settler, Clifford O'Neil. The first post office was in his home and was located about one mile south-east of where the village is today. Neilburg was established as a hamlet in 1923 and by 1946, it had grown big enough to be incorporated as the village of Neilburg.

The village is about 6 kilometres (3.7 mi) away from the north-east corner of Manitou Lake. On the north-west corner of the lake is Big Manitou Regional Park.

== History ==
Neilburg incorporated as a village on 1 January 1947.

In 1999, crop circles were discovered in a field near the village.

== Demographics ==
Population history (1981–2016)
Year	Pop.	±%
1981	354	—
1986	368	+4.0%
1991	355	−3.5%
1996	345	−2.8%
2001	366	+6.1%
2006	394	+7.7%
2011	448	+13.7%
2016	379	−15.4%
Source: Statistics Canada via Saskatchewan Bureau of Statistics

In the 2021 Census of Population conducted by Statistics Canada, Neilburg had a population of 371 living in 160 of its 192 total private dwellings, a change of −2.1% from its 2016 population of 379. With a land area of 1.24 km^{2} (0.48 sq mi), it had a population density of 299.2/km^{2} (774.9/sq mi) in 2021.

In the 2016 Census of Population, the Village of Neilburg recorded a population of 379 living in 157 of its 175 total private dwellings, a −18.2% change from its 2011 population of 448. With a land area of 1.22 km^{2} (0.47 sq mi), it had a population density of 310.7/km^{2} (804.6/sq mi) in 2016.

== See also ==
- List of villages in Saskatchewan
