= Saskatchewan Highway 29 =

Provincial highway in Saskatchewan, Canada

Highway 29
- Highway 29 highlighted in red

Route information
- Maintained by Ministry of Highways and Infrastructure
- Length: 49.7 km (30.9 mi)

Major junctions
- South end: Highway 14 at Wilkie
- North end: Highway 40 near Battleford

Location
- Country: Canada
- Province: Saskatchewan
- Rural municipalities: Buffalo, Battle River

Highway system
- Provincial highways in Saskatchewan
← Highway 28	→ Highway 30

Highway 29 is a provincial highway in the Canadian province of Saskatchewan. It runs from Highway 14 at Wilkie to Highway 40 just west of Battleford. Highway 29 is a minor north-south highway of about 50 kilometres (31 mi). For most of the route, the speed limit is 100 km/h (62 mph).

Highway 29 originally continued south from Wilkie to Kelfield and Plenty; however, it was decommissioned in the 1940s. The former section is now designated as Highway 657.

== Route description ==
Highway 29 begins in the town of Wilkie at an intersection with Highway 14, heading due north through neighbourhoods on the western side of town before travelling past Wilkie Regional Park and making a sharp right turn onto Second Avenue. After passing through a business district on the north side of town, the highway makes a sharp left onto Tenth Street E, heading north to cross a railroad and have a junction with Highway 784. Leaving Wilkie, it enters the Rural Municipality of Buffalo No. 409 and heads north, then northeast through rural areas of farmland for several kilometres, eventually entering the Rural Municipality of Battle River No. 438. After having an intersection with both Highway 689 and Highway 787, Hwy 29 winds its way through the northern portion of the Eagle Hills before travelling through a wooded area for a few kilometres to come to an end at an intersection with Highway 40 (Poundmaker Trail), just across the Battle River from Battleford. The entire length of Highway 29 is a paved, two-lane highway.

== Major intersections ==
From south to north:

Rural municipality	Location	km	mi	Destinations	Notes
Buffalo No. 409	Wilkie	0.0	0.0	Highway 14 – Unity, Camrose, Biggar, Saskatoon	Southern terminus
Buffalo No. 409	Wilkie	2.7	1.7	Highway 784 east – Cando	
Battle River No. 438		27.0	16.8	Highway 689 north / Highway 787 west – Prongua, Cloan	
Battle River No. 438	Battleford	49.7	30.9	Highway 40 (Poundmaker Trail) to Highway 4 – Cut Knife, Wainwright, North Battleford	Northern terminus
1.000 mi = 1.609 km; 1.000 km = 0.621 mi

== See also ==
- Transportation in Saskatchewan
- Roads in Saskatchewan
