= Rural Municipality of Cut Knife No. 439 =

Rural municipality in Saskatchewan, Canada

Cut Knife No. 439
- Rural municipality
- Rural Municipality of Cut Knife No. 439
- Location of the RM of Cut Knife No. 439 in Saskatchewan
- Coordinates: 52.861°N 108.953°W
- Country: Canada
- Province: Saskatchewan
- Census division: 13
- SARM division: 6
- Formed: December 13, 1909

Government
  - Reeve: Brett Robertson
  - Governing body: RM of Cut Knife No. 439 Council
  - Administrator: Don McCallum
  - Office location: Cut Knife

Area (2016)
  - Land: 653 km^{2} (252 sq mi)

Population (2016)
  - Total: 364
  - Density: 0.6/km^{2} (1.6/sq mi)
- Time zone: CST
  - Summer (DST): CST
- Area codes: 306 and 639

The Rural Municipality of Cut Knife No. 439 (2016 population: 364) is a rural municipality (RM) in the Canadian province of Saskatchewan within Census Division No. 13 and SARM Division No. 6.

== History ==
The RM of Cut Knife No. 439 incorporated as a rural municipality on December 13, 1909.

== Geography ==
=== Communities and localities ===
The following urban municipalities are surrounded by the RM.

Towns

- Cut Knife

The following unincorporated communities are within the RM.

Special service areas

- Rockhaven (dissolved as a village, December 31, 2007)

Localities

- Cutoff Junction
- Gallivan
- Tatsfield
- Wilbert

== Demographics ==
Population history (1981–2016)
Year	Pop.	±%
1981	523	—
1986	525	+0.4%
1991	509	−3.0%
1996	486	−4.5%
2001	448	−7.8%
2006	390	−12.9%
2011	359	−7.9%
2016	364	+1.4%
Source: Statistics Canada via Saskatchewan Bureau of Statistics

In the 2021 Census of Population conducted by Statistics Canada, the RM of Cut Knife No. 439 had a population of 415 living in 179 of its 364 total private dwellings, a change of 14% from its 2016 population of 364. With a land area of 651.33 km^{2} (251.48 sq mi), it had a population density of 0.6/km^{2} (1.7/sq mi) in 2021.

In the 2016 Census of Population, the RM of Cut Knife No. 439 recorded a population of 364 living in 163 of its 370 total private dwellings, a 1.4% change from its 2011 population of 359. With a land area of 653 km^{2} (252 sq mi), it had a population density of 0.6/km^{2} (1.4/sq mi) in 2016.

== Attractions ==
- Clayton McLain Memorial Museum
- World's Largest Tomahawk
- Chief Poundmaker Historical Center
- Atton Lake Regional Park
- Table Mountain Regional Park

== Government ==
The RM of Cut Knife No. 439 is governed by an elected municipal council and an appointed administrator that meets on the second Wednesday of every month. The reeve of the RM is Brett Robertson while its administrator is Don McCallum. The RM's office is located in Cut Knife.

== Transportation ==
- Saskatchewan Highway 21
- Saskatchewan Highway 40
- Saskatchewan Highway 674
- Canadian Pacific Railway
- Cut Knife Airport

== See also ==
- List of rural municipalities in Saskatchewan
