= Rural Municipality of Buffalo No. 409 =

Rural municipality in Saskatchewan, Canada

Buffalo No. 409
- Rural municipality
- Rural Municipality of Buffalo No. 409
- Location of the RM of Buffalo No. 409 in Saskatchewan
- Coordinates: 52.497°N 108.451°W
- Country: Canada
- Province: Saskatchewan
- Census division: 13
- SARM division: 6
- Formed: December 13, 1909

Government
  - Reeve: Leslie Kroschinski
  - Governing body: RM of Buffalo No. 409 Council
  - Administrator: Sherry Huber
  - Office location: Wilkie

Area (2016)
  - Land: 1,222.08 km^{2} (471.85 sq mi)

Population (2016)
  - Total: 506
  - Density: 0.4/km^{2} (1.0/sq mi)
- Time zone: CST
  - Summer (DST): CST
- Area codes: 306 and 639

The Rural Municipality of Buffalo No. 409 (2016 population: 506) is a rural municipality (RM) in the Canadian province of Saskatchewan within Census Division No. 13 and SARM Division No. 6.

== History ==
The RM of Buffalo No. 409 incorporated as a rural municipality on December 13, 1909.

== Geography ==
=== Communities and localities ===
The following urban municipalities are surrounded by the RM.

Towns

- Wilkie

The following unincorporated communities are located within the RM.

Unincorporated hamlets

- Bush
- Cloan
- Phippen
- Red Pheasant
- Swarthmore
- Thackeray

== Demographics ==
Population history (1981–2016)
Year	Pop.	±%
1981	598	—
1986	565	−5.5%
1991	518	−8.3%
1996	473	−8.7%
2001	618	+30.7%
2006	525	−15.0%
2011	506	−3.6%
2016	506	+0.0%
Source: Statistics Canada via Saskatchewan Bureau of Statistics

In the 2021 Census of Population conducted by Statistics Canada, the RM of Buffalo No. 409 had a population of 420 living in 173 of its 188 total private dwellings, a change of −17% from its 2016 population of 506. With a land area of 1,204.97 km^{2} (465.24 sq mi), it had a population density of 0.3/km^{2} (0.9/sq mi) in 2021.

In the 2016 Census of Population, the RM of Buffalo No. 409 recorded a population of 506 living in 192 of its 204 total private dwellings, a 0% change from its 2011 population of 506. With a land area of 1,222.08 km^{2} (471.85 sq mi), it had a population density of 0.4/km^{2} (1.1/sq mi) in 2016.

== Government ==
The RM of Buffalo No. 409 is governed by an elected municipal council and an appointed administrator that meets on the second Monday of every month. The reeve of the RM is Leslie Kroschinski while its administrator is Sherry Huber. The RM's office is located in Wilkie.

== See also ==
- List of rural municipalities in Saskatchewan
