= Poundmaker Cree Nation =

First Nation reserve in Saskatchewan

The Poundmaker Cree Nation (Cree: ᐲᐦᑐᑲᐦᐊᓇᐱᐏᔨᐣ, pîhtikwahânapiwiyin) is a Cree First Nations band government, whose reserve community is located near Cut Knife, Saskatchewan. It is a Treaty 6 nation, started by the famous Cree Chief Poundmaker, also known as Pitikwahanapiwiyin. The band has 1281 members with 505 living on the reserve. Its location is northwest of North Battleford and Saskatoon. Poundmaker Cree Nation is home to the Battle of Cut Knife National Historic Site of Canada. Veteran actor Gordon Tootoosis was born in Poundmaker.

== Reserves ==
Poundmaker Cree Nation has reserved for itself several reserves:

- Poundmaker 114
- Poundmaker 114-1A
- Poundmaker 114-2A
- Poundmaker 114-2B
- Poundmaker 114-2C
- Poundmaker 114-3A
- Poundmaker 114-3B
- Poundmaker 114-4A
- Poundmaker 114-5A
- Poundmaker 114-5B
- Poundmaker 114-6A2
- Poundmaker 114-6A3
- Poundmaker 114-6B2
- Poundmaker 114-6C2
- Poundmaker 114-7A
- Poundmaker 114-8A
- Poundmaker 114-9
- Poundmaker 114-9A
- Poundmaker 114-10A
- Poundmaker 114-11A
- Poundmaker 114-12
- Poundmaker 114-13
- Poundmaker 114-15
- Poundmaker 114-15C
- Poundmaker 114-16
- Poundmaker 114-17
- Poundmaker 114-17A
- Poundmaker 114-18A
- Poundmaker 114-18B
- Poundmaker 114-19
- Poundmaker 114-21
- Poundmaker 114-22
- Poundmaker 114-28
- Poundmaker 114-29
