= The Battlefords =

Community in Saskatchewan, Canada

- Metropolitan area
- Location of The Battlefords in Saskatchewan
- Coordinates: 52°45′27″N 108°17′10″W
- Country: Canada
- Province: Saskatchewan
- Communities: Town of Battleford; City of North Battleford

Area
  - Metropolitan area: 855.34 km^{2} (330.25 sq mi)
  - Urban: 56.88 km^{2} (21.96 sq mi)

Population (2016)
  - Metropolitan area: 19,623
  - Density: 22.9/km^{2} (59/sq mi)
  - Urban: 18,744
  - Urban density: 329.519/km^{2} (853.45/sq mi)
- Time zone: UTC−6 (CST)
- Area codes: 306, 639
- Highways: Highway 16 (TCH); Highway 4 Highway 29; Highway 40
- Website: The Battlefords

The Battlefords is the collective name given to the adjacent communities of the city of North Battleford and the town of Battleford in west-central Saskatchewan, Canada. The two communities are separated by the North Saskatchewan River and connected via the Battlefords Bridge. As of the 2011 census, the two communities have a combined population of 18,744 and a total regional population of 19,623.

The Battlefords are served by Highways 16 (Yellowhead Highway), 4, 29, and 40 (Poundmaker Trail).

== North Battleford CA ==
Census agglomerations (CA) is the term Statistics Canada uses to determine the demographics of urban areas with a population between 10,000 and 100,000 people. The North Battleford CA includes the North Battleford, Battleford, and the Rural Municipality of North Battleford No. 437. The Rural Municipality of Battle River No. 438, which encompasses the Town of Battleford, as well as the Sweet Grass Indian Reserve No. 113-M16 were part of the North Battleford CA in 2011, but were removed in 2016.

== List of census subdivisions ==
Municipality	Subdivision type	North Battleford CA	Federal census population (2011)	Federal census population (2016)
Battleford	Town	Y	4,065	4,429
Battle River No. 438	Rural Municipality	N	1,099	1,154
North Battleford	City	Y	13,888	14,315
North Battleford	Crown Colony	N	164	154
North Battleford No. 437	Rural Municipality	Y	733	725
Total Urban Population (The Battlefords)			17,953	18,744
Total North Battleford CA			19,216	19,623
Total Battlefords Region			19,949	20,931

== See also ==
- List of communities in Saskatchewan
