= Poundmaker =

Plains Cree chief (c. 1842-1886)

Poundmaker pîhtokahânapiwiyin
- Cree headman
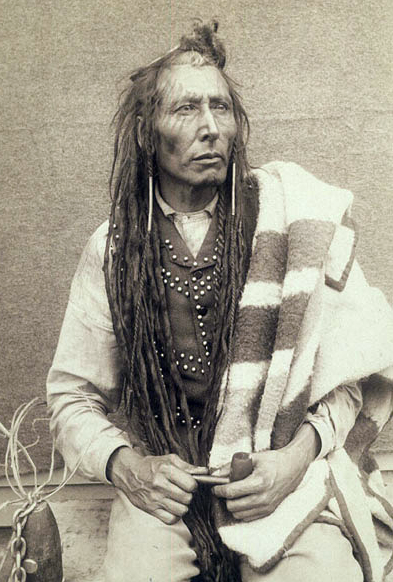
- Chief Poundmaker (1885)
- Born: Pîhtokahanapiwiyin; 1842 near Battleford, Rupert's Land, British North America
- Died: 4 July 1886 (aged 43–44); Blackfoot Crossing, Alberta, North-West Territories, Canada
- Father: Sikakwayan

Poundmaker (c. 1842 – 4 July 1886), also known as pîhtokahânapiwiyin (Cree: ᐲᐦᑐᑲᐦᐋᓇᐱᐏᔨᐣ), was a Plains Cree chief known as a peacemaker and defender of his people, the Poundmaker Cree Nation. His name denotes his special craft at leading buffalo into buffalo pounds (enclosures) for harvest.

In 1885, during the North-West Rebellion, his band was attacked by Canadian troops and a battle ensued. After the rebellion was suppressed, he surrendered and was convicted of treason and imprisoned. He died of illness soon after his release. In May 2019, Canadian Prime Minister Justin Trudeau exonerated the chief and apologized to the Poundmaker Cree Nation.

== Name ==
According to Cree tradition, or oral history, pîhtokahânapiwiyin, known to English speakers as Chief Poundmaker, gained his name for his special ability to attract buffalo into pounds. A buffalo pound resembled a huge corral with walls covered by the leaves of thick bushes. Usually herds of buffalo were stampeded into this trap. But sometimes buffalo were drawn in by a person such as Poundmaker, who according to tradition was gifted by spirit helpers, singing and drumming a special song to entice a lead buffalo cow to lead her herd into the enclosure.

== Biography ==
Poundmaker was born in Rupert's Land, near present-day Battleford; the child of Sikakwayan (sikâkwayân), an Assiniboine medicine man, and a mixed-blood Cree woman, the sister of Chief Mistawasis (mistawâsis). Following the death of his parents, Poundmaker, his brother (Yellow Mud Blanket, osâwasiskîwakohp), and his younger sister, were all raised by their mother's Cree community, led by Chief Wuttunee (wataniy), later known as the Red Pheasant Band. In his adult life, Poundmaker gained prominence during the 1876 negotiations of Treaty 6 and split off to form his own band. In 1881, the band settled on a reserve about 40 km northwest of Fort Battleford. Poundmaker was not opposed to the idea of a treaty, but became critical of the Canadian government's failures to live up to its promises.

In 1873, Crowfoot, chief of the Blackfoot First Nation, had adopted Poundmaker thereby increasing the latter's influence. This move also cemented the ties between the Blackfoot and the Cree, which successfully stopped the struggling over the now very scarce buffalo.

=== North-West Rebellion ===
The shortage of bison left Poundmaker's people desperately famished, and in 1885, they travelled south to Battleford. Oral history accounts suggest Poundmaker went to the fort to speak with the Indian agent, Rae, and reaffirm his loyalty to the Queen after a murder at the nearby Mosquito Reserve; however, the people of Battleford and some of the settlers in the surrounding area, hearing reports of large numbers of Cree and Assiniboine leaving reserves and making their way to Battleford, feared for their safety. On the night of 30 March 1885, the townspeople began to abandon the town and seek shelter in the North-West Mounted Police Fort Battleford. When Poundmaker and his party reached the town, the Indian agent refused to come out of the fort to meet with them. He kept them waiting for two days. Telegrams sent by those barricaded in the fort indicated they believed it was an attack, but Peter Ballantyne exited the fort and, acting as a spy, checked Poundmaker's plans and found his intentions peaceful.

Looting of the abandoned buildings of the town took place, but the identity of the looters is disputed. Some reports claimed Poundmaker's people were responsible, but one observer alleged that most of the looting had already been done by whites. White witness oral history suggests daily looting by Indians. Native tradition suggests the looting was done by Nakoda people, and that Poundmaker did his best to stop it. Either way, Poundmaker's people left the next day, to establish an encampment at Cut Knife Hill.

On 2 May 1885, a military force of 332 Canadian troops, led by Lieutenant-Colonel William Dillon Otter, crossed Cut Knife Creek and attacked Poundmaker's camp on Cut Knife Hill. Lieutenant R.S. Cassels, attached to the command of the "C" School, a military division of the troops under Otter, stated the following:

About 4 P.M. the column starts. Our force is eight scouts; sixty Mounted Police under Captain Neale; "B" Battery, eighty men under Major Short; "C" School, forty-five men under Lieutenant Wadmore, No. 1 Company, Queen's Own Rifles, under Captain Brown, fifty-five men; Battleford Rifles, under Captain Nash, forty men; twenty men of the Guards under Lieutenant Gray and Queen’s Own Rifles Ambulance Corps; Surgeon Lesslie; Sergeant Fere and eight men; Colonel Otter in command; and Colonel Herchmer, Surgeon Strange, Captain Mutton and Lieutenant Sears on the Staff. Hume Cronyn, E. C. Acheson, and Blakely of "K", McLennan and Prior of "T", Farin Wallace and Grierson of "H", Fraser and A. J. Boyd of "F" is attached to No. 1.

After six hours of inconclusive skirmishing and suffering casualties, Otter ordered the withdrawal. As his force retreated, Poundmaker, who had not taken part in the fight, coaxed his band's fighters not to pursue the soldiers. Likely, his actions prevented the loss of many lives on both sides as the active pursuit of the fleeing force would have prolonged the conflict as serious countermeasures would have been put into use to cover the retreat, and the Cree would likely have killed many as the soldiers made their retreat.

A few weeks later, after Louis Riel's defeat at Batoche, Poundmaker and his starving band went to Battleford to make peace with Major-General Middleton.

=== Surrender, trial and death ===
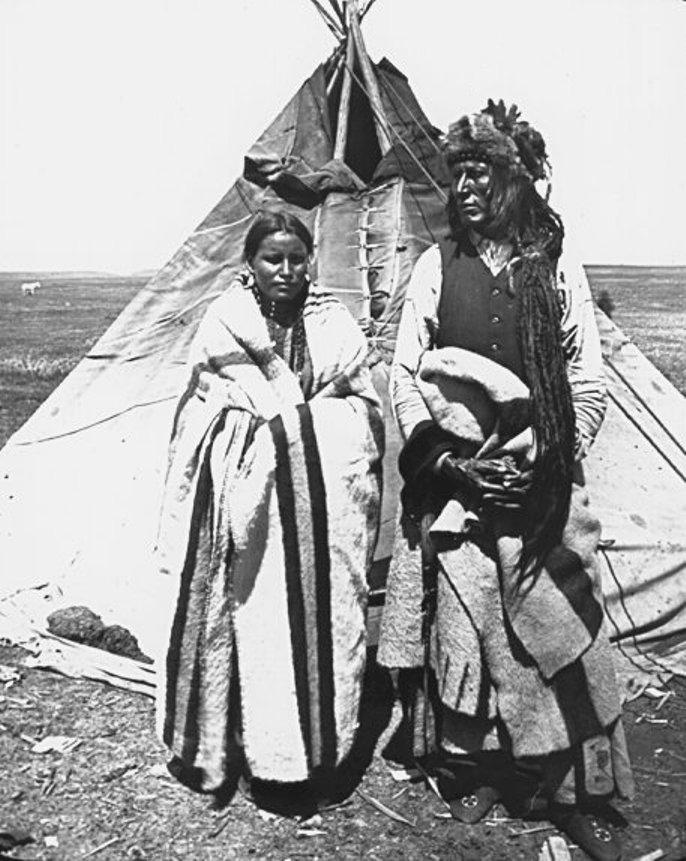
Poundmaker and his wife

With the news of Riel's actions and defeat at Batoche, Poundmaker surrendered on May 26.

On the basis of a letter written by Louis Riel bearing his name, Poundmaker was convicted of treason in 1885 and sentenced to three years in Stony Mountain Penitentiary. He said to Riel, "You did not catch me, I gave myself up. I wanted peace."

At his trial, he is reported to have said:

Everything that is bad has been laid against me this summer, there is nothing of it true ... Had I wanted war, I would not be here now. I should be on the prairie. You did not catch me. I gave myself up. You have got me because I wanted justice.

Because of the power of his adopted father, Crowfoot, Poundmaker's hair was not cut in prison, and he served only seven months. Nonetheless, his stay there devastated his health and led to his death (from a lung hemorrhage) in 1886, at the age of 44.

He was buried at Blackfoot Crossing near Gleichen, Alberta, but his remains were exhumed in 1967, and reburied on the Poundmaker Reserve, Saskatchewan. Pictures from the exhumation and reburial were donated to the Allen Sapp museum in North Battleford.

=== Exoneration ===
Prime Minister Justin Trudeau spoke to members of the Poundmaker Cree Nation and others gathered at Cut Knife Hill, on 23 May 2019 to exonerate Poundmaker and clear his memory.

In part he said: "The Government of Canada recognizes that Chief Poundmaker was not a criminal, but someone who worked tirelessly to ensure the survival of his people, and hold the Crown accountable to its obligations as laid out in Treaty 6. We recognize that the unjust conviction and imprisonment of Chief Poundmaker had, and continues to have, a profound impact on the Poundmaker Cree Nation."

== Legacy ==
The Poundmaker Cree Nation continues to this day, near Cut Knife. Cut Knife Hill, the site of the North-West Rebellion battle, has been renamed Poundmaker Hill.

His grandnephew John Tootoosis, Cree leader, and great-grandnephew Gordon Tootoosis, actor, both lived on this reserve.

Poundmaker appears as the leader of the Cree in Sid Meier's Civilization VI, having bonuses related to trade and diplomacy. His appearance in the game drew criticism from some members of the Poundmaker Cree Nation, who felt that, by being included in a game partially based around expansion and conquest, his values and those of the Cree were misrepresented, and criticized the company for not formally approaching community elders, though they also acknowledged his positive portrayal, and hoped his inclusion in the game would help his, at the time ongoing, exoneration by publicizing his figure.
