= Wilkie, Saskatchewan =

Town in Saskatchewan, Canada

Wilkie
- Town
- Location within Saskatchewan Location within Canada
- Coordinates: 52.409°N 108.7°W
- Country: Canada
- Province: Saskatchewan
- Census division: 13
- Rural Municipality (RM): Buffalo No. 409
- Provincial Constituency: Cut Knife-Turtleford
- Federal Electoral District: Battlefords—Lloydminster
- Post Office Founded: 1907

Government
  - Mayor: David Ziegler
  - Administrator: Rebecca Parent
  - Governing body: Wilkie Town Council
  - MP: Rosemarie Falk, (CON)
  - MLA: James Thorsteinson, (SKP)

Area
  - Total: 9.48 km^{2} (3.66 sq mi)

Population (2021)
  - Total: 1,195
  - Density: 129.5/km^{2} (335/sq mi)
- Time zone: CST
- Postal code: S0K 4W0
- Area code: 306
- Highways: Highway 29 Highway 14
- Website: Official website

Wilkie is a town in the Canadian province of Saskatchewan, located at Section 5, Township 40, Range 19, west of the 3rd Meridian (of the Dominion Land Survey). The town is at the junctions of Highways 14, 29, and 784.

Wilkie is surrounded by the RM of Buffalo No. 409 to the north and the RM of Reford No. 379 to the south.

== History ==
On February 2, 1907, the first post office was established with the name Glenlogan at Section 4, Township 40, Range 19, west of the 3rd Meridian. The post office changed names on October 1, 1908, to Wilkie. The town of Wilkie, Saskatchewan was named after Mr. Daniel Robert Wilkie, who was the president of the Imperial Bank of Canada (1906–1914), a backer of the Canadian Pacific Railway, and a member of the Canadian Art Club. Mr. Wilkie and his family lived at "Seven Oaks", a heritage property at 432 Sherbourne Street, Toronto, which was completed in 1875. His son, Major Arthur Benson Wilkie, graduated from the Royal Military College of Canada and served with the Royal Sussex Regiment (1901–1920) in Lucknow, India (1902); Thorncliffe, England (1903–04); Malta (1904–05); Candia, Crete (1906); British Legation, Peking (1908); and Toronto, Ontario (1910–1920). His other son Major Charles Stuart (Chas) Wilkie served as a lieutenant with the Royal Canadian Artillery (1899–1919) and volunteered with the 10th Regiment in South Africa during the Boer War (1899–1900) and during the Great War.

Wilkie was once home to "The World's Largest Grasshopper" (a roadside attraction), which used to be located in front of the town rink and hall.

== Transportation ==
Wilkie is a station on the Canadian Pacific Railway line from Portage la Prairie, via Saskatoon to Edmonton, 160 kilometres west of Saskatoon. Wilkie is also the starting point of Canadian Pacific's Reford Branch, to Kerrobert, 44.6 miles (71.8 km) to the south-west, and of the former Kelfield Branch, of the CPR, to Kelfield, 35.4 miles (57.0 km) south.

Adjacent to Wilkie is the abandoned aerodrome, Wilkie Airport.

== Parks and recreation ==
Wilkie Regional Park (52.4127°N 108.7147°W) is a regional park that was established on February 24, 1970, on land owned by the town. The park is well treed and features 22 campsites, four ball diamonds, and a picnic area. It is located along the west side of town along Highway 29.

On the south side of town is Wilkie Golf Club. It is a 9-hole golf course with grass greens.

The Wilkie Saskcan Community Centre has an ice rink and curling rink. On October 9, 2015, an electrical fire caused significant damage to the building. In 2019, Wilkie was a top four Kraft Hockeyville finalist. Funds from that and a campaign started by Brett Wilson, raised $126,000 for a new ice plant for the facility. Installation of the new ice plant started in the summer of 2021 and was up and running by September 29, 2021.

== Demographics ==
In the 2021 Census of Population conducted by Statistics Canada, Wilkie had a population of 1,195 living in 509 of its 569 total private dwellings, a change of −2% from its 2016 population of 1,219. With a land area of 9.22 km^{2} (3.56 sq mi), it had a population density of 129.6/km^{2} (335.7/sq mi) in 2021.

Canada census – Wilkie, Saskatchewan community profile

	2011
Population	1,301 (+6.5% from 2006)
Land area	9.48 km^{2} (3.66 sq mi)
Population density	137.3/km^{2} (356/sq mi)
Median age	47.4 (M: 46.4, F: 48.0)
Private dwellings	598 (total)
Median household income

References: 2011

== Education ==
Wilkie is home to Norman Carter Elementary School (k–6) and McLurg High School (7–12).

== Latimer controversy ==
Wilkie was the site of the controversial murder of Tracy Latimer, a 12-year-old girl with cerebral palsy, on October 24, 1993. Her father, Robert Latimer, killed her via carbon monoxide poisoning at the Latimer family farm near Wilkie, wanting to end her suffering. The case sparked a national controversy on the definition and ethics of euthanasia, as well as the rights of people with disabilities. The killing led to two Supreme Court decisions, R. v. Latimer (1997), on Section Ten of the Canadian Charter of Rights and Freedoms, and later R. v. Latimer (2001), on cruel and unusual punishments under Section Twelve of the Canadian Charter of Rights and Freedoms. Latimer was released on day parole in March 2008 and was granted full parole on November 29, 2010.

== See also ==
- List of communities in Saskatchewan
- List of towns in Saskatchewan
