= Cut Knife, Saskatchewan =

Town in Saskatchewan, Canada

Cut Knife
- Town
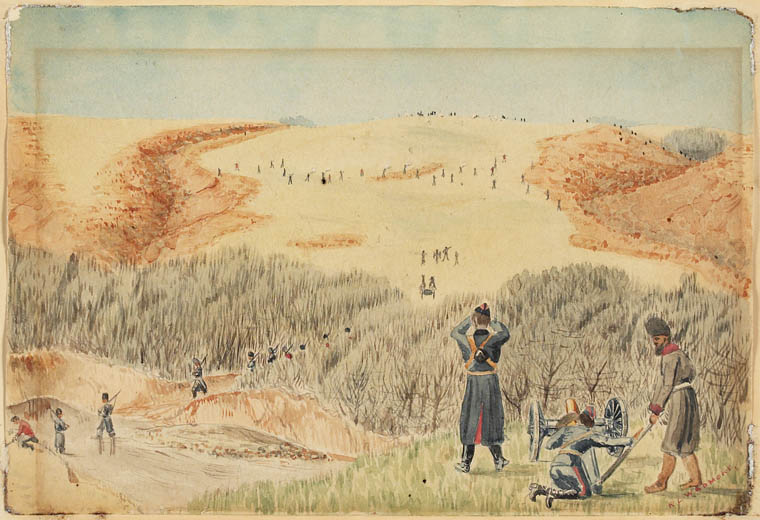
- Battle of Cut Knife Creek

- Location of Cut Knife in Saskatchewan
- Coordinates: 52°44′44″N 109°01′14″W
- Country: Canada
- Province: Saskatchewan
- Rural municipality: Cut Knife
- Post Office established: 1905-11-01

Government
  - Mayor: Don McCallum
  - Administrator: Jennifer King

Area
  - Total: 1.99 km^{2} (0.77 sq mi)

Population (2016)
  - Total: 573
  - Density: 259.3/km^{2} (672/sq mi)
- Time zone: UTC−6 (Central Standard Time)
- Postal code: S0M 0N0
- Highways: Highway 40
- Website: Official website

Cut Knife is a town in the Canadian province of Saskatchewan on Highway 40, northwest of Saskatoon and 55 km (34 mi) west of North Battleford. The population of Cut Knife in 2011 was 517.

Nearby are Poundmaker Cree Nation and Little Pine First Nation to the north in Paynton, Sweetgrass First Nation to the east, and Hillsvale Hutterite Colony to the northwest of the town.

== History ==
Cut Knife is named after Cut Knife Hill (now called Chief Poundmaker Hill) situated on the Poundmaker reserve. The hill was named after a Sarcee chief killed nearby by the Cree in the 1840s.

The town is close to the site of the Battle of Cut Knife which occurred during the North-West Rebellion of 1885.

== Demographics ==
In the 2021 Census of Population conducted by Statistics Canada, Cut Knife had a population of 547 living in 222 of its 259 total private dwellings, a change of −4.5% from its 2016 population of 573. With a land area of 1.88 km^{2} (0.73 sq mi), it had a population density of 291.0/km^{2} (753.6/sq mi) in 2021.

Canada census – Cut Knife community profile

	2021	2011
Population	547 (-4.5% from 2016)	517 (-2.8% from 2006)
Land area	1.88 km^{2} (0.73 sq mi)	1.99 km^{2} (0.77 sq mi)
Population density	290.6/km^{2} (753/sq mi)	259.3/km^{2} (672/sq mi)
Median age	40.8 (M: 38.0, F: 46.0)	46.9 (M: 46.7, F: 47.3)
Private dwellings	259 (total) 222 (occupied)	258 (total)
Median household income	$66,000

References: 2021 2011

== Attractions ==
At Cut Knife is the "World's Largest Tomahawk", the Poundmaker Historical Centre and the Big Bear monument. There is also now, correctly located, a cairn erected by the Historic Sites and Monuments Board of Canada upon Cut Knife Hill overlooking the Poundmaker Battle site and Battle River valley.

The tomahawk is located in the Tomahawk Park next to the Clayton McLain Memorial Museum. It was built in 1971 as a symbol of unity and friendship with the First Nations of the area. It was designed in 1970 by UMA Engineering of Saskatoon, Saskatchewan.

== See also ==
- Cut Knife Airport
