= Saskatchewan Highway 16 =

Provincial highway in Saskatchewan, Canada

Highway 16
- Yellowhead Highway
- Highway 16 highlighted in red
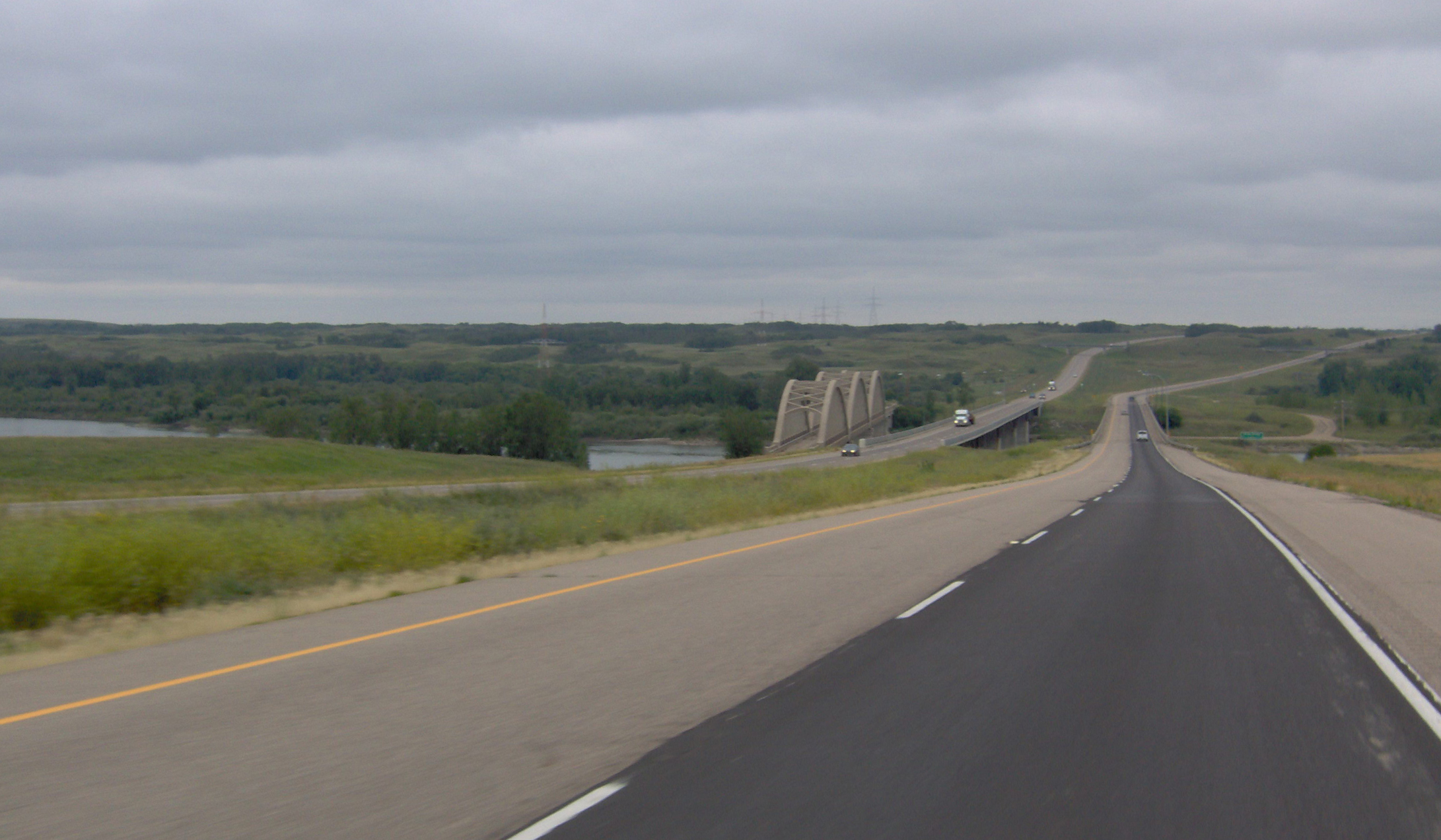
- Highway 16 as it is crossing the North Saskatchewan River via the new Borden Bridge

Route information
- Maintained by Ministry of Highways and Infrastructure & Transport Canada
- Length: 689.2 km (428.2 mi)

Major junctions
- West end: Highway 16 (TCH) at Alberta boundary in Lloydminster
- Highway 17 in Lloydminster; Highway 21 at Maidstone; Highway 4 at The Battlefords; Highway 11 in Saskatoon; Highway 5 in Saskatoon; Highway 2 near Colonsay; CanAm Highway / Highway 6 at Dafoe; Highway 35 at Elfros; Highway 9 in Yorkton; Highway 10 in Yorkton; Highway 15 near Bredenbury; Highway 8 at Langenburg
- East end: PTH 16 (TCH) at Manitoba boundary near Marchwell

Location
- Country: Canada
- Province: Saskatchewan
- Rural municipalities: Brittania, Wilton, Elson, Paynton, Battle River, North Battleford, Mayfield, Great Bend, Corman Park, Blucher, Colonsay, Viscount, Usborne, Prairie Rose, Big Quill, Elfros, Foam Lake, Insinger, Orkney, Saltcoats, Churchbridge, Langenburg
- Major cities: Lloydminster, North Battleford, Saskatoon, Yorkton

Highway system
- Provincial highways in Saskatchewan
← Highway 15	→ Highway 16A

Highway 16 is a provincial highway in Saskatchewan, Canada. The highway represents Saskatchewan's section of the Trans-Canada Yellowhead Highway. It runs from the Alberta border in Lloydminster at the intersection with Highway 17 south-east to the Manitoba border east of Marchwell, Saskatchewan, near Yorkton. Major cities along the route include Saskatoon and North Battleford in the central part of the province, Yorkton in the east, and Lloydminster to the west.

Highway 16 is a divided, four-lane, limited-access road from the Alberta–Saskatchewan border to just east of the village of Clavet. From Clavet east to the Manitoba border, it is an undivided, two-lane highway with multiple passing lanes. Through the city of Saskatoon, the highway officially has a 2.5-kilometre (1.6 mi) concurrency along Idylwyld Drive; however, Highway 11 and Highway 16 are cosigned along the entirety of Saskatoon's Circle Drive.

The Yellowhead Route began as the Yellowhead Red River cart trail. When the province of Saskatchewan was surveyed, the road evolved from a dirt to gravel to all-weather road known as Provincial Highway 5 from the Alberta–Saskatchewan border to Saskatoon, and as Provincial Highway 14 from Saskatoon to the Manitoba–Saskatchewan border. In the late 1950s and 1960s, the highway was straightened and widened. On August 15, 1970 the Yellowhead was opened for the northern Trans-Canada Highway. The highway was completely designated for the entire route as Saskatchewan Highway 16 in 1976.

== Route description ==
=== Highway 16 West ===
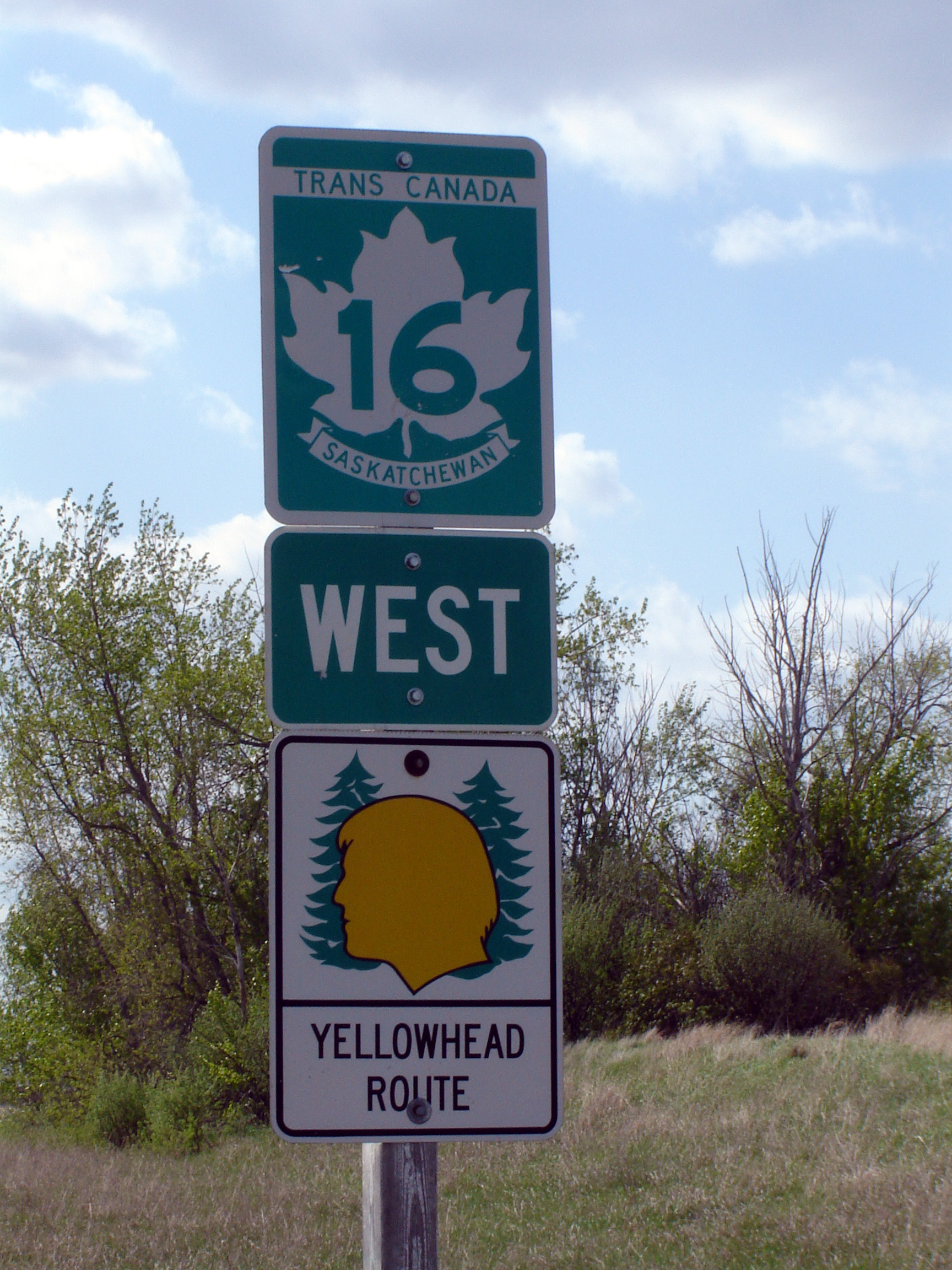
A Yellowhead Highway route marker in Saskatchewan

Saskatchewan's Highway 16 is a segment of the Yellowhead Highway that traverses the width of the province. The western section is twinned and runs from Lloydminster east to Saskatoon. Major highways that intersect 16 West include 17, 21, 4, 40, and 11. Cities include Lloydminster, North Battleford, and Saskatoon.

Highway 16 begins as a continuation of Alberta's Highway 16 at the intersection of the north–south Highway 17 in the city of Lloydminster. Lloydminster straddles the border of Saskatchewan and Alberta with Highway 17 running right down the provincial boundary. Over-sized border markers run down either side of Highway 17 through Lloydminster. From its western terminus at Highway 17, Highway 16 travels east through the Saskatchewan side of Lloydminster; as the highway exits the city, it passes by the Lloydminster Upgrader where it turns south-east towards a weigh scale, Marshall, and Lashburn. South-east of Lashburn, the highway turns east towards Waseca.

From Waseca, Highway 16 continues east to Maidstone where it has a 2-mile concurrency with Highway 21. Maidstone was bypassed in 2005 when the highway was twinned. After Maidstone, it resumes its south-easterly travel to Battleford. En route to Battleford, the highway provides access to Paynton, Bresaylor, and Delmas. Attractions along this section include Silver Lake Regional Park and a 5.5-metre (18 ft) high Canola Plant Sculpture at Maidstone and Bresaylor Museum at Bresaylor. From about Paynton onward to Battleford, the highway parallels the North Saskatchewan River. At the north end of Battleford, Highway 16 approaches a partial cloverleaf interchange, where it becomes concurrent with Highways 4/40 as the freeway heads north-east across the North Saskatchewan River via the dual-spanned Battlefords Bridge. Prior to the building of the Battlefords Bridge, Highway 16 had continued south into Battleford where it crossed the river via the Battleford Bridge. After the completion of the first span of the Battlefords Bridge, that leg of Highway 16 was renamed Highway 16A. Soon after the completion of the second span in 2002, Battleford Bridge was closed to vehicle traffic and 16A was decommissioned.

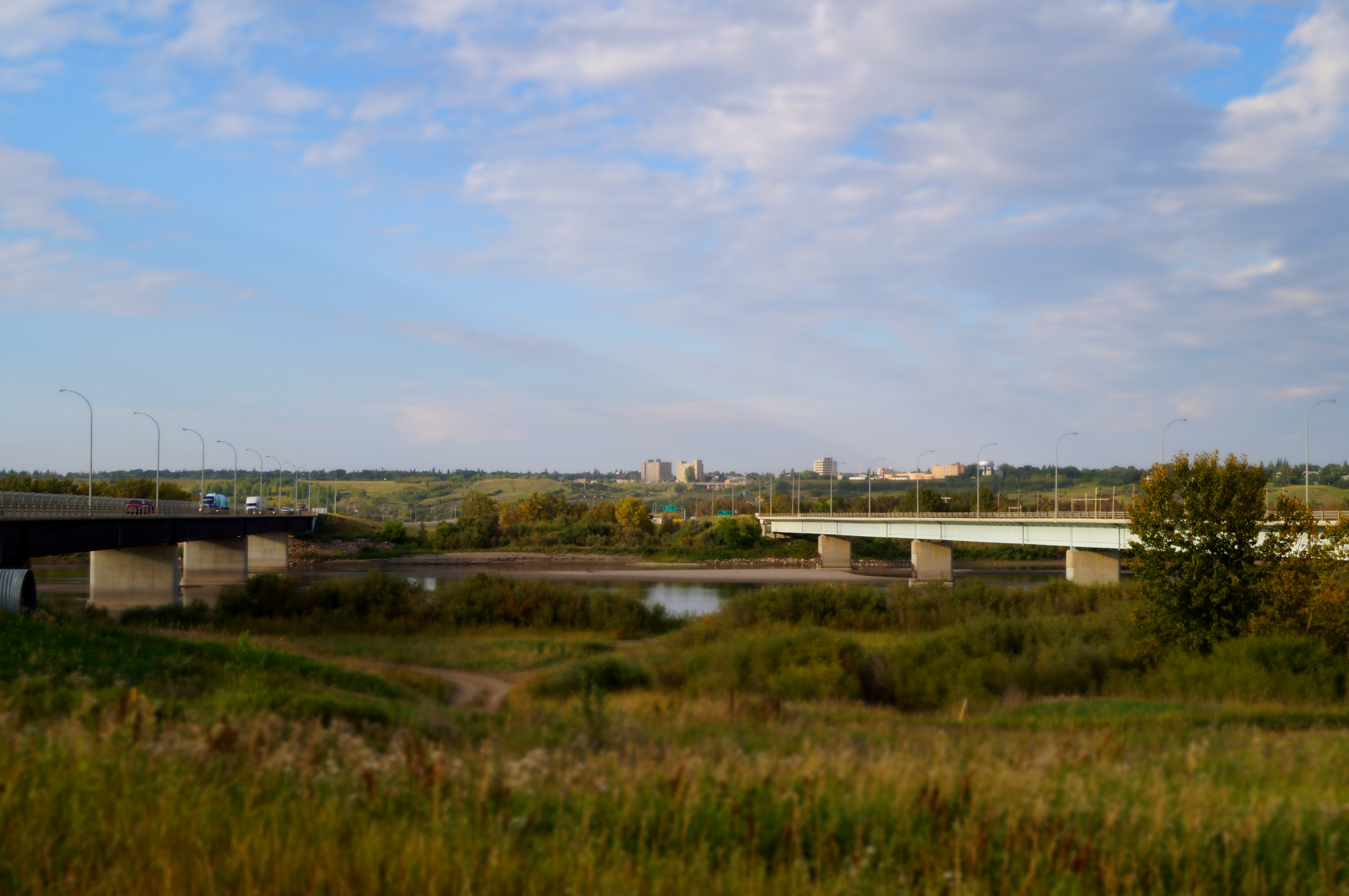
Battlefords Bridge (August 2014)

Immediately after crossing the Battlefords Bridge, Highway 4 continues north into the city of North Battleford, while 40 and 16 veer south-east, skirting the southern edge of the city. Highway 40 then turns east, while 16 continues south-east. Highway 16B, an earlier routing of Highway 16, runs through North Battleford. Attractions accessible from the highway in North Battleford include the RCMP Statue, Gold Eagle Casino, and the Western Development Museum. From the intersection with Highway 40, Highway 16 continues south-east for a further 90 kilometres (56 mi), paralleling the North Saskatchewan River. Communities along this stretch include Brada, Denholm, Ruddell, Maymont, Fielding, Radisson, and Borden. After Borden, the highway once again crosses the North Saskatchewan River via a highway bridge. The highway bridge parallels the old Borden Bridge, which was closed to vehicle traffic in 1985. At the foot of the southern end of the bridge is the Borden Bridge Campground.

After crossing the river, Highway 16 continues south-east, passes by Langham, a weigh station, and heads towards Saskatchewan's largest city, Saskatoon. At the northern end of the city, it is met by the north–south Highway 11. The two highways share a short 2.5-kilometre (1.6 mi) concurrency along Idylwyld Drive before reaching a diamond interchange at Circle Drive, a ring road around the city of Saskatoon. Highways 11 and 16 are cosigned in both directions around Circle Drive in Saskatoon; however, the official "Highway 16" designation follows Circle Drive East while "Highway 11" designation continues south along Idylwyld Drive (unsigned) towards Downtown Saskatoon. The two highways meet up again at a cloverleaf interchange at the south-eastern end of Saskatoon, where Highway 11 heads south to Regina while Highway 16 continues east towards Yorkton.

=== Highway 16 East ===
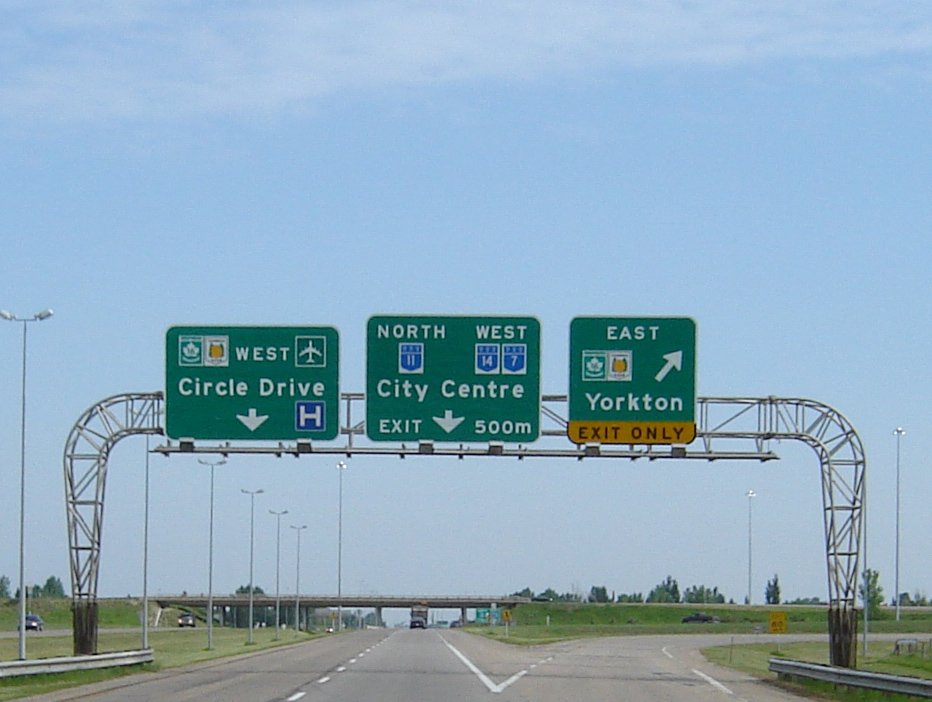
Travelling north along Highway 11 (June 2007) into the Highway 16 and 11 cloverleaf interchange at Circle Drive in Saskatoon. Opening in 1967, it was one of the first two interchanges in Saskatchewan.

The eastern portion of Highway 16 runs from Saskatoon south-east to the border with Manitoba. Only the 29-kilometre (18 mi) section east of the junction with Highway 11 is twinned. Major highways that intersect 16 East include 11, 2, 6, 35, 47, 9, 15, and 8. Cities include Saskatoon and Yorkton.

The first community east of Saskatoon is Clavet. When this section of Highway 16 was twinned in 2016, Clavet was bypassed. The original section of Highway 16 runs through the town as "Old Highway 16". Highway 316 runs north–south connecting the Old Highway 16 and Clavet with Highway 16. About 9 kilometres (5.6 mi) east of the intersection with Highway 316, the divided highway portion of Highway 16 ends. It continues east as an undivided highway, providing access to the communities of Elstow and Colonsay before intersecting with the north–south Highway 2, Saskatchewan's longest highway. Highway 2 runs from the Canada–United States border crossing, the Opheim–West Poplar River Border Crossing, north to La Ronge, in Saskatchewan's northern boreal forest. From that intersection with Highway 2, 16 heads south-east towards the Quill Lakes, providing access to Viscount, Sclanders, Plunkett, Wolverine, Guernsey, Lanigan Potash Mine, Lanigan, Esk, and Jansen. Along this section, Highway 16 has a 10-kilometre (6.2 mi) long concurrency with Highway 20 that runs from Guernsey east to Lanigan. Langenburg is home to the world's largest swing, named Goliath, and is the last incorporated Saskatchewan community before the Manitoba provincial boundary.

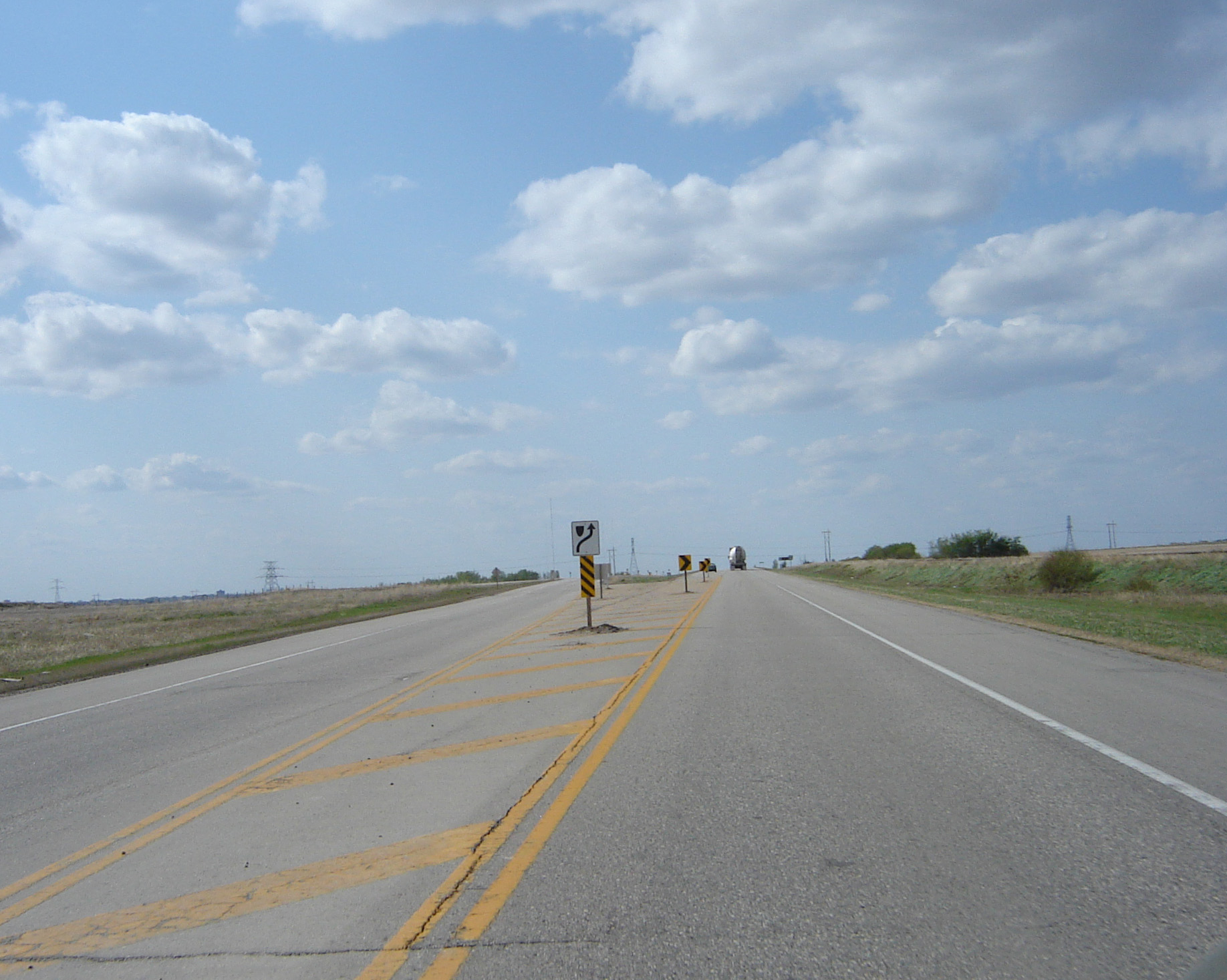
Travelling west on Highway 16 towards Saskatoon at the start of the divided highway (May 2007)

At the Big Qill Lake, Highway 16 intersects with Highway 6, where it begins a 5.2-kilometre (3.2 mi) southbound concurrency with 6. At the community of Dafoe, Highway 16 leaves the concurrency with 6 and heads east, skirting the southern end of Big Quill Lake en route Highway 35. Big Quill Lake is the largest salt lake in Canada, and the Quill Lakes complex (consisting of Big, Middle, and Small Quill Lakes) is part of the Western Hemisphere Shorebird Reserve Network. Communities along this section of 16 include Kandahar, Wynyard, and Elfros. Wynyard Regional Park is 2.4 kilometres (1.5 mi) south of Highway 16 and Wynyard along Highway 640.

From the intersection with Highway 35, 16 continues south-east en route to the town of Foam Lake. It provides access to the village of Leslie and passes by the southern shore of Foam Lake. At Foam Lake, Highway 16 intersects Highway 310 and then heads east for 14 kilometres (8.7 mi) before resuming its south-easterly routing to the city of Yorkton. Communities along this stretch include Sheho, Insinger, Theodore, and Springside. From about Sheho to Springside, the highway parallels the Whitesand River. At Springside, Highway 16 intersects another north–south highway, Highway 47, which runs from the Canada–US border north to Preeceville. A statue of a sharp-tailed grouse, Saskatchewan's provincial bird, was erected in 1985 at Sheho to commemorate both the 80th anniversary of the province of Saskatchewan and the incorporation of Sheho as a village.

As the highway approaches Yorkton, it turns east to Highway 9. At that bend, Highway 16A splits off and continues south-east into Yorkton. At the north–south Highway 9, the two highways begin a 3.3-kilometre (2.1 mi) long, southbound concurrency. Highway 10 also joins this concurrency for 1.7 kilometres (1.1 mi). When Highway 16 leaves the concurrency, it resumes its south-easterly routing to Saskatchewan's border with Manitoba. Attractions at Yorkton include the Western Development Museum and York Lake Regional Park. Communities along the final section of Highway 16 from Yorkton to the Manitoba border include Rokeby, Saltcoats, Bredenbury, Churchbridge, Langenburg, and Marchwell. A large Canadian Dollar Coin was erected in 1993 at Churchbridge south of the Yellowhead to commemorate Rita Swanson, the artist resident of Churchbridge whose design was chosen to mark Canada's 125th birthday in 1992. About 5.5 kilometres (3.4 mi) east of Marchwell is the Manitoba border where the Yellowhead Highway continues as Manitoba Highway 16 to Portage la Prairie and Winnipeg.

== History ==
Travel across Canada originated in the early 19th century when the Hudson's Bay Company and North West Company wanted to transport furs from the east to Fort St. James in the New Caledonia district (in present day British Columbia). Sir George Simpson, governor of the Hudson's Bay Company, employed a surveyor, James Macmillan, to find a route west. James Macmillan used the Iroquois guide Pierre Bostonais to help find the most feasible path. Pierre Bostonais was nicknamed Tête Jaune, which is French for 'yellow head', due to his blonde hair. Leather was needed at Fort St. James for moccasins and mukluks. The path from Saskatchewan to British Columbia through the Rocky Mountains became known as the 'Leather Pass' or 'Leather Track' and then more commonly the 'Yellowhead'. Pierre Bostonais "has been credited with blazing the Old North-West Trail — the forerunner of the Yellowhead Highway". The beginnings of this overland route can be found in the 19th century travel along the Carlton Trail, a Red River cart dirt trail which connected Fort Garry, Fort Ellice, Fort Carlton, Fort Battleford, and Fort Pitt through a northerly route.

In Saskatchewan, cars appeared in the early 20th century. By the late 1920s, the roads were gravelled near the larger centres such as Yorkton, Saskatoon, the Battlefords, and Lloydminster. All-weather roads were developed in the 1930s, which began to depart from the surveyed township roads connecting centres directly. Roads also were constructed to allow for rain run-off, with a rounded top surface.

A larger improvement came about as a part of the industrial revolution in the 1940s following the return of the men from World War II. Following World War II, improved economic and farming factors saw an increase of taxation, and mechanized road building programs resulting in better roads. Improved highways and travel by automobile soon saw the demise of a great majority of settlements along the prairie which were lively communities in the first half of the 20th century.

November 1947 saw communities along the Yellowhead organize together with caravans and meetings to encourage the Trans-Canada Trail to build on the northern route connecting Eastern and Western Canada. The southern route, Saskatchewan's Highway 1, the Trans-Canada Highway, was officially opened in 1957. The northern route — the Yellowhead Highway — was officially opened on August 15, 1970.

=== Provincial Highway 14 ===
Provincial Highway 14, the precursor to Highway 16 East, followed the surveyed grade of the Manitoba and North West Railway, later the Canadian Pacific Railway (CPR), between the Manitoba border and Saskatoon. Travel along the current Highway 16 East before the 1940s would have been travelling on the 'square' following the township road allowances, barbed wire fencing, and railway lines. As the surveyed township roads were the easiest to travel, the first highway was designed on 90-degree, right-angle corners as the distance traversed the prairie along range roads and township roads. Two-horse, then eight-horse scrapers, maintained these early dirt roads. The gravelling of Provincial Highway 14 was begun in 1930, starting from Wynyard to Manitoba was gravel. By the 1940s, the entire eastern route gravelled.

The construction of Number 14 Highway between Lanigan and Saskatoon was started in 1929. It was to have an earth-built road bed, with a right of way of 66 feet (20 m) and a road surface of 24 feet (7.3 m).

Some of the communities serviced by Provincial Highway 14 included Elstow, Churchbridge, Fountain, Sheho, and Lanigan. In 1955, the highway near Sheho was re-routed and completely rebuilt. In 1957, the route was straightened bypassing Plunkett and Viscount.

The 1957 road specifications were a right of way of 150′ and a road surface of 38′. The centre 22′ of this road was oiled, leaving 8′ gravel shoulders on each side.

=== Provincial Highway 5 ===
Provincial Highway 5, known as the 'Evergreen Route', the precursor to Highway 16 West, followed the surveyed grade of the Canadian Northern Railway, later the Canadian National Railway (CNR), between Saskatoon and the Alberta border at Lloydminster.

One benefit from the grading of the two railways was that good construction roads paralleled the lines. Thus, the modern Yellowhead Highway between Saskatoon and Lanigan owes its origins to the grading crews.

The one event that had the greatest impact on the western segment of the Yellowhead was the decision of Donald Mann and William Mackenzie, owners of the Canadian Northern, to build from Manitoba to the Pacific.

In 1927 the Department of Highways suggested that the Jasper Highway follow the C.N.R. tracks between Radisson and Borden, but the Town did not agree with this and asked that the old highway on the square be continued—6 miles (9.7 km) or 7 miles (11 km) east of Radisson, thence south 4 miles (6.4 km) to a point near Borden. This plan was followed at that time. In 1930 a delegation from council addressed the Minister of Highways and the Cabinet at Regina requesting that #5 Highway be an all-weather highway across the Province. In other words gravel all the way. In 1947 several lots on the north of the town were sold to the Provincial Department of Highways for the construction of Highway #5 to by-pass the town on the north end.

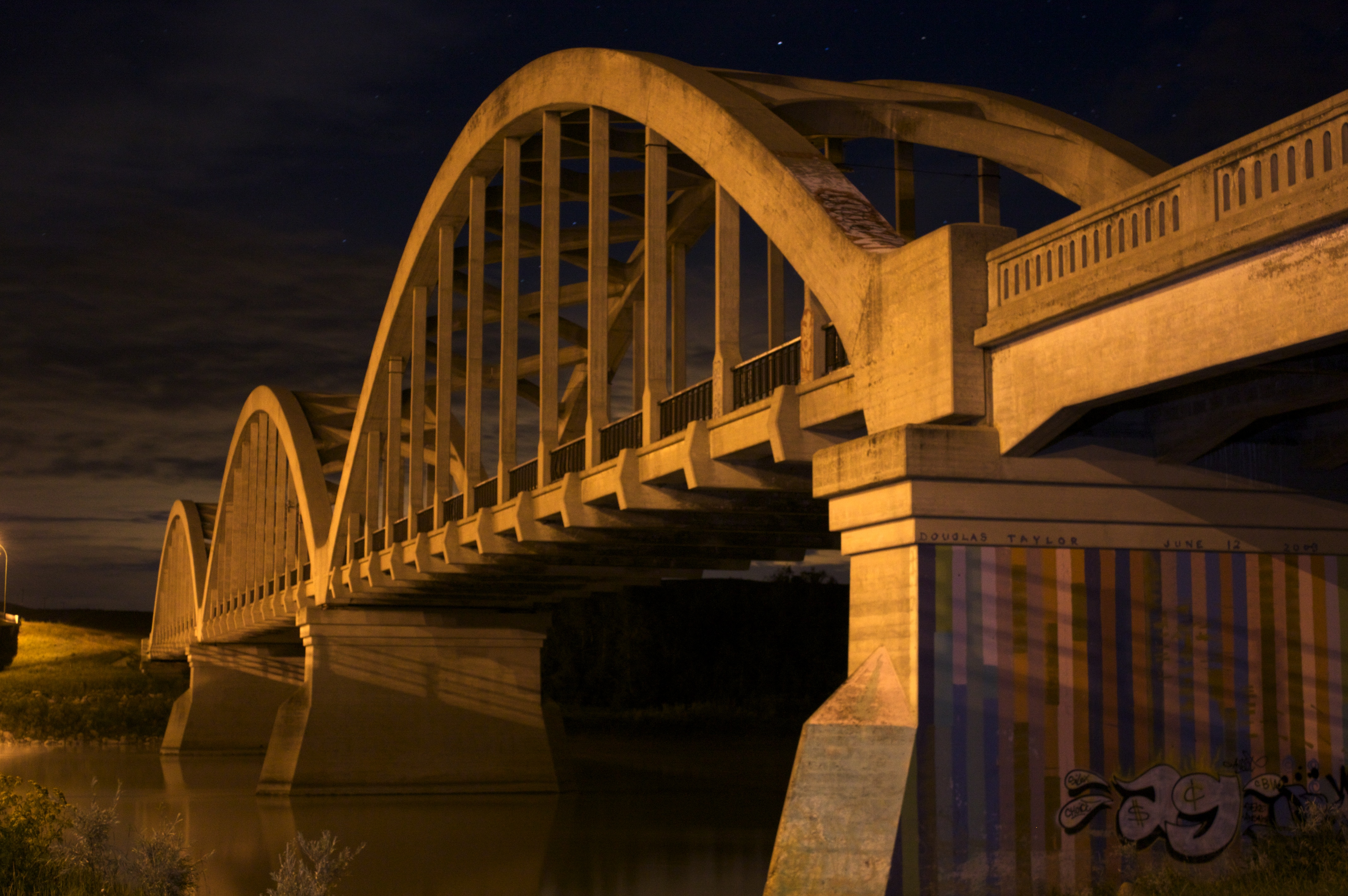
Borden Bridge (August 2008)

Up until 1936, a ferry was used to cross the North Saskatchewan River along Highway 5's route. The Borden Bridge was completed in 1936 replacing the ferry service. The north-western route from Saskatoon was gravelled by 1955. By then, it was "an excellent all-weather hard-top road running into Saskatoon and connecting with good roads to other centres". The Borden Bridge–Saskatoon cut off was officially opened on October 20, 1969, shortening the trip between North Battleford and Saskatoon by 6 miles (9.7 km). As the highway was developed and the course straightened out, some towns disappeared as they were disconnected from the highway. Dalmeny survived the Borden Bridge–Saskatoon straightening project.

Situated on the North Saskatchewan River near the confluence of the Battle River, The Battlefords were at a major junction. Highways 4, 5, and 40, as well as the CNR and CPR, all went through town.

=== Archaeology site ===
The original Kirilovka Doukhobor village was discovered by the Saskatchewan Highways and Transportation when undertaking construction of new lanes for Provincial Highway 5 north-west of Saskatoon, and west of Langham. Excavations commenced August 23, 1996. A 1944 aerial photograph was superimposed upon the Highway 5 construction area showing house foundations.

== Highway 16 twinning ==
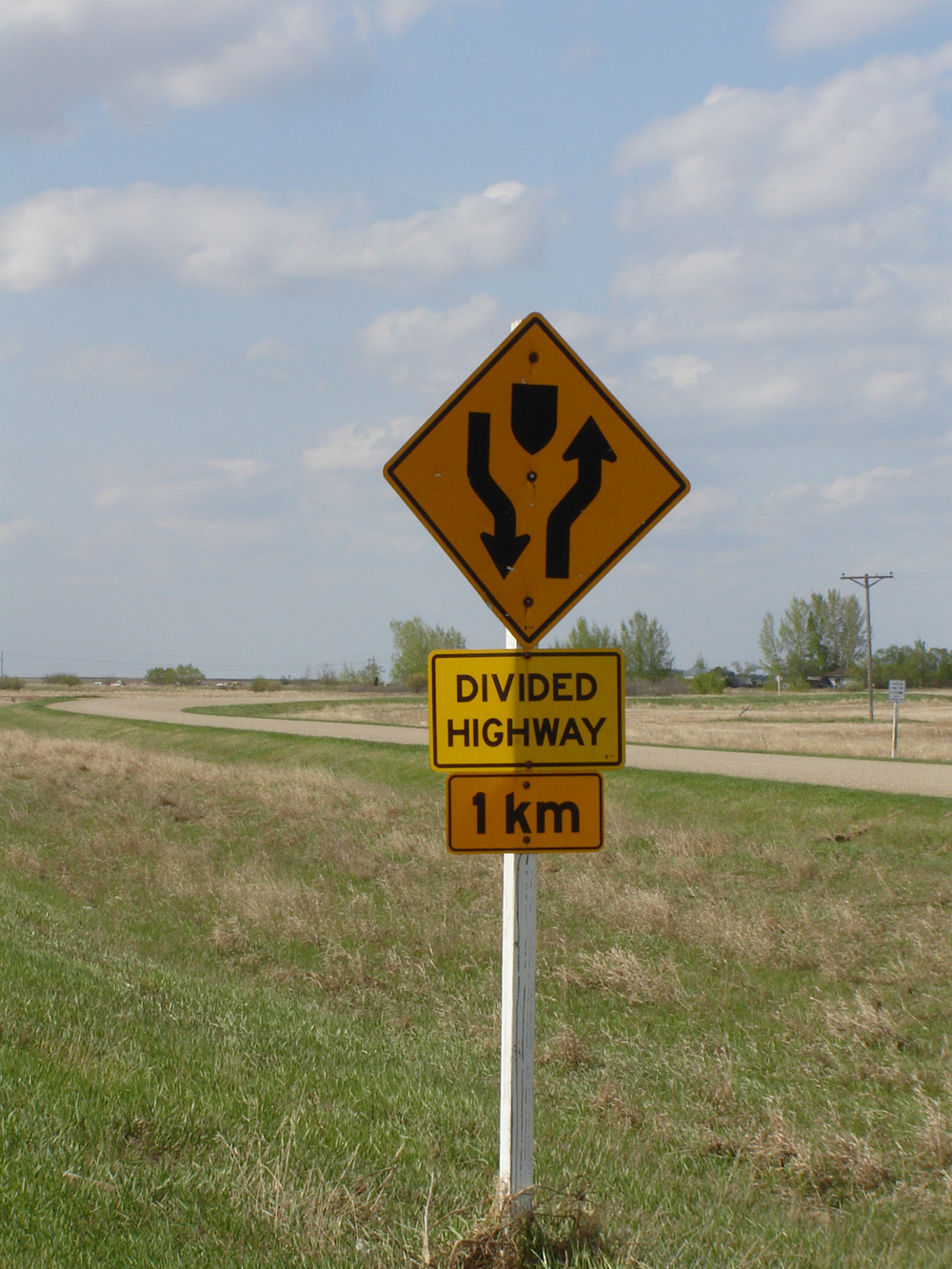
Progressing westerly on the Yellowhead Highway approaching Saskatoon

About 310 kilometres (190 mi) of Highway 16 is twinned from Lloydminster to east of Saskatoon near the Bradwell Road Access, east of Clavet. It was twinned in stages from the late 1990s to the late 2010s. By 2012, twinning was complete from Saskatoon west to the Alberta border. While there are no immediate plans to twin the rest of Highway 16 East, 26 passing lanes were constructed in 2023 between Clavet and the Manitoba border. "Passing lanes are typically a minimum of two kilometres (km) and allow drivers to pass slower moving vehicles safely". In 2023, a petition was begun to advocate for twinning the remainder of the highway east to the Manitoba border.

Originally, Highway 16's route through Saskatoon was via Idylwyld Drive. In 1983, the north-east quadrant of Circle Drive — a divided perimeter highway around Saskatoon — was completed. A few years later, it was designated as the Highway 16 / Yellowhead Route through Saskatoon. This route includes the twin-span Circle Drive Bridge over the South Saskatchewan River.

One result of the twinning is that the highway now bypasses the village of Clavet, rather than passing through the community.

Notable twinning stages include

- 1997 — Hwy 16 West, a 92 km (57 mi) long section between Saskatoon and North Battleford
- 2000 — Hwy 16 West, a 10.7 km (6.6 mi) long section between Lashburn and Marshall
- 2001 — Hwy 16 West, a 16.2 km (10.1 mi) long section from east of Lashburn to just west of Maidstone
- 2002 — the opening of the twin-span Battlefords Bridge over the North Saskatchewan River
- 2002 — a 3.2 km (2.0 mi) long section from west of the Highway 16 / 4 junction to the Battlefords Bridge
- 2005 — Hwy 16 West, a 13.6 km (8.5 mi) long section from 5 km (3.1 mi) east of Delmas east towards the already four-laned section west of North Battleford
- 2005 — Hwy 16 West, a 19 km (12 mi) long section from "7.1 km east of the east junction of Highway 21 at Maidstone to 3.8 km west of the west junction of Highway 21"
- 2016 — Hwy 16 East, a 19.5 km (12.1 mi) long section from Saskatoon east to just west of Highway 763

== Major intersections ==
From west to east:

Rural municipality	Location	km	mi	Destinations	Notes
City of Lloydminster		0.0	0.0	Highway 16 (TCH/YH) west (Ray Nelson Drive) – Edmonton	Continuation into Alberta
City of Lloydminster		0.0	0.0	50 Avenue (Highway 17) – Onion Lake, Macklin	Alberta/Saskatchewan border
Britannia No. 502	No major junctions				
Wilton No. 472		4.2	2.6	Highway 303 east – Turtleford	
Wilton No. 472	Marshall	18.0	11.2	Highway 688	
Wilton No. 472	Lashburn	33.2	20.6	Highway 675 north	West end of Highway 675 concurrency
Wilton No. 472		34.5	21.4	Highway 675 south – Neilburg	East end of Highway 675 concurrency
Eldon No. 471	Waseca	42.8	26.6	Highway 684	
Eldon No. 471		51.0	31.7	Highway 21 south – Unity	West end of Highway 21 concurrency
Eldon No. 471	Maidstone	54.2	33.7	Highway 21 north – St. Walburg	East end of Highway 21 concurrency
Paynton No. 470	Paynton	82.2	51.1	Highway 674 south – Cut Knife	West end of Highway 674 concurrency
Paynton No. 470		86.9	54.0	Highway 674 north	East end of Highway 674 concurrency
Battle River No. 438	Delmas	106.7	66.3	Highway 689 south – Prongu	
Town of Battleford		135.2	84.0	Highway 4 south / Highway 40 west (Poundmaker Trail) – Battleford, Cut Knife, Swift Current	Interchange; west end of Highway 4 / Highway 40 concurrency; former Highway 16A east
↑ / ↓		136.0	84.5	Battlefords Bridge over the North Saskatchewan River	
City of North Battleford		136.7	84.9	Highway 4 north / Highway 16B (TCH) east (Business Loop) – Meadow Lake	Interchange; northbound exit and southbound entrance; east end of Highway 4 concurrency
City of North Battleford		138.6	86.1	Battleford Road / Poundmaker Trail	Former Highway 16A west
City of North Battleford		139.5	86.7	Highway 16B (TCH) west (Business Loop) to Highway 4 north – Meadow Lake	At-grade; no eastbound exit
City of North Battleford		140.3	87.2	Highway 40 east – Prince Albert	East end of Highway 40 concurrency
North Battleford No. 437	No major junctions				
Mayfield No. 406	Denholm	160.6	99.8	Highway 687 north	
Mayfield No. 406	Maymont	183.6	114.1	Highway 376 – Richard, Asquith	
Great Bend No. 405	Radisson	208.3	129.4	Highway 340 north – Hafford	
Great Bend No. 405	Borden	221.4	137.6	Highway 685 north	
↑ / ↓		227.6	141.4	Crosses the North Saskatchewan River; Adjacent to Borden Bridge	
Corman Park No. 344		229.2	142.4	Highway 672 south – Grandora, Vanscoy	
Corman Park No. 344	Langham	242.7	150.8	Highway 305 east – Dalmeny	
Corman Park No. 344		247.4	153.7	Highway 784 – Struan, Warman	
Corman Park No. 344		259.1	161.0	Dalmeny Road (Highway 684) to Highway 7 / Highway 14 – Dalmeny	Basic restricted crossing U-turn controlled intersection
City of Saskatoon		266.8	165.8	Marquis Drive	At-grade; westbound access to Highway 11 north / Highway 12 north
City of Saskatoon		268.4	166.8	Idylwyld Drive (Highway 11 north) to Highway 12 – Blaine Lake, Prince Albert	Interchange; northbound exit and southbound entrance; Highway 16 follows Idylwyld Drive; west end of Highway 11 concurrency
City of Saskatoon		269.9	167.7	Avenue C south / 51 Street east – Airport	Interchange
City of Saskatoon		271.2	168.5	Circle Drive (Highway 11 south / Highway 16 east) Idylwyld Drive (Highway 11 south) – City Centre	Interchange; Highway 16 officially follows Circle Drive east; Highway 11 officially follows Idylwyld Drive; Circle Drive is signed as Highway 11 / Highway 16 in its entirety
City of Saskatoon		271.2– 272.5	168.5– 169.3	Traffic signals along Circle Drive	
City of Saskatoon		272.8	169.5	Warman Road – City Centre	Interchange
City of Saskatoon		273.9	170.2	Circle Drive Bridge over South Saskatchewan River	
City of Saskatoon		274.5	170.6	Preston Avenue	Eastbound exit only; former Preston Avenue alignment
City of Saskatoon		275.4	171.1	Preston Avenue / Attridge Drive	Interchange
City of Saskatoon		276.9	172.1	108th Street	Interchange; eastbound exit and westbound entrance
City of Saskatoon		277.8	172.6	College Drive (Highway 5) to Highway 41 – City Centre, Humboldt, Melfort	Interchange
City of Saskatoon		278.7	173.2	14th Street	Interchange; eastbound exit and westbound entrance
City of Saskatoon		279.5	173.7	8th Street	Interchange
City of Saskatoon		280.6	174.4	Taylor Street	Interchange
City of Saskatoon		282.3	175.4	Circle Drive west (Highway 11 north / Highway 16 west) – City Centre Highway 11 south – Regina	Interchange; Highway 11 officially follows Circle Drive west
City of Saskatoon		284.4	176.7	Boychuk Drive	Interchange
City of Saskatoon		287.0	178.3	Zimmerman Road (Highway 394 east)	
Corman Park No. 344	Floral	292.4	181.7	Highway 663 south (Foral Road) / Freeborn Road	
Blucher No. 343		301.2	187.2	Highway 316 – Clavet	Clavet west access
Blucher No. 343		304.9	189.5	Old Highway 16 – Clavet	Clavet east access
Blucher No. 343		311.4	193.5	Highway 763 – Bradwell	
Blucher No. 343	Elstow	323.1	200.8	Highway 397 south – Allan	
Colonsay No. 342	Colonsay	337.2	209.5		
Colonsay No. 342		345.2	214.5	Highway 2 (Veterans Memorial Highway) – Prince Albert, Watrous, Moose Jaw	
Viscount No. 341	Viscount	353.7	219.8	Highway 670 – Young, Bruno	
Viscount No. 341	Plunkett	367.7	228.5	Highway 365 south – Watrous	
Usborne No. 310	Guernsey	386.5	240.2	Highway 668 south – Guernsey	Former Highway 396 south
Usborne No. 310		389.8	242.2	Highway 20 north – Humboldt	West end of Highway 20 concurrency
Usborne No. 310	Lanigan	396.5	246.4	Highway 761	
Usborne No. 310	Lanigan	399.9	248.5	Highway 20 south – Drake, Nokomis	East end of Highway 20 concurrency
Prairie Rose No. 309	Esk	411.8	255.9	Highway 667 north – St. Gregor	
Prairie Rose No. 309	Jansen	420.3	261.2	Jansen Access Road	
Prairie Rose No. 309		431.7	268.2	Highway 6 / CanAm Highway north – Melfort	West end of Highway 6 concurrency
Big Quill No. 308	Dafoe	436.9	271.5	Highway 6 / CanAm Highway south – Regina	East end of Highway 6 concurrency
Big Quill No. 308	Wynyard	460.1	285.9	Highway 640 – Quill Lake, Punnichy	
Elfros No. 307	Mozart	474.7	295.0	Highway 639 south / Mozart access road – Wishart	
Elfros No. 307	Elfros	485.8	301.9	Highway 35 – Wadena, Leross	
Foam Lake No. 276	Foam Lake	509.8	316.8	Highway 310 – Kuroki, Ituna	
Insinger No. 275	Sheho	534.7	332.2	Highway 617 – Invermay, Homefield	
Insinger No. 275	Theodore	560.4	348.2	Highway 651 north / Highway 726 east	
Insinger No. 275	Springside	577.2	358.7	Highway 47 – Buchanan, Melville Highway 726 east	
Orkney No. 244		595.2	369.8	Highway 52A south / Grain Millers Drive (Yorkton Truck Bypass)	
City of Yorkton		599.2	372.3	Highway 16A (TCH) east (Smith Street) – City Centre	Highway 16 follows York Road
City of Yorkton		602.7	374.5	Highway 9 north / York Road – Canora	West end of Highway 9 concurrency
City of Yorkton		604.4	375.6	Highway 10 east / Highway 10A west / Highway 16A (TCH) west (Broadway Street) to Highway 52 – Dauphin, City Centre, Ituna	West end of Highway 10 concurrency
City of Yorkton		606.0	376.6	Highway 10 west (Queen Street) – Melville, Regina Highway 9 south – Whitewood	East end of Highway 9 / Highway 10 concurrency
Wallace No. 243	No major junctions				
Saltcoats No. 213		623.6	387.5	Highway 637 north – Tonkin	West end of Highway 637 concurrency
Saltcoats No. 213		626.0	389.0	Highway 629 south (Atwater Road) – Atwater	
Saltcoats No. 213	Saltcoats	631.4	392.3	Highway 725 east	
Saltcoats No. 213	Bredenbury	645.7	401.2	Highway 723 east (Broadway Avenue) – Bredenbury	
Saltcoats No. 213	Bredenbury	646.7	401.8	Highway 637 south – Esterhazy	East end of Highway 637 concurrency
Saltcoats No. 213		650.4	404.1	Highway 15 west – Melville	
Churchbridge No. 211	Churchbridge	658.7	409.3	Highway 80 – Kamsack, Esterhazy	
Churchbridge No. 211		667.1	414.5	Highway 636 south – Gerald	
Langenburg No. 181	Langenburg	674.2	418.9	Highway 8 – MacNutt, Moosomin	
Langenburg No. 181		689.2	428.2	PTH 16 (TCH) east / YH – Russell, Winnipeg	Continues into Manitoba
1.000 mi = 1.609 km; 1.000 km = 0.621 mi: Concurrency terminus; Incomplete access; Route transition

== See also ==
- Transportation in Saskatchewan
- Roads in Saskatchewan

Yellowhead Highway
Previous route AB Highway 16	Highway 16	Next route MB Provincial Trunk Highway 16
Trans-Canada Highway
Previous route AB Highway 16	Highway 16	Next route MB Provincial Trunk Highway 16
