= Insinger =

Insinger can refer to:

- Insinger, Saskatchewan, an unincorporated community in Saskatchewan, Canada
- Insinger de Beaufort, an Anglo-Dutch private bank
- Insinger Papyrus, an ancient Egyptian papyrus
- Harris Insinger, an American race car driver
- Rural Municipality of Insinger No. 275, a rural municipality in Saskatchewan, Canada
