= Finlayson Island =

Island in Saskatchewan, Canada

- Location in Saskatchewan Finlayson Island (Canada)

Geography
- Location: North Saskatchewan River
- Coordinates: 52.7414°N 108.2866°W
- Length: 4 km (2.5 mi)
- Highest elevation: 439 m (1440 ft)

Administration
- Canada
- Province: Saskatchewan
- Region: The Battlefords

Finlayson Island is an island along the course of the North Saskatchewan River in the Canadian province of Saskatchewan. The island is situated between the town of Battleford on the south bank of the river and the city of North Battleford on the north. To the north of the island is the Battlefords Bridge and to the south is North Saskatchewan River's confluence with Battle River. Access to Finlayson Island is from the old Battleford Bridge.

On the island is the Finlayson Island Nature Park, a picnic area, and multiple biking and hiking trails. During the winter, the trails are groomed for cross-country skiing. The island has riparian forests, marshlands, grasslands, and sand dunes as well as an abundance of wildlife.

Finlayson Island was named after Donald Finlayson on 25 March 1965 by the Government of Saskatchewan. Finlayson was a homesteader in the nearby Battle River Valley, member of the home guard during the North-West Rebellion, and a local MLA from 1908 to 1934.

== Recreation and access ==
Prior to the completion of the upstream Battlefords Bridge, the Battleford Bridge connected the two Battlefords and carried Highway 16 across the North Saskatchewan River. The Battleford Bridge is composed of two bridges — the South Truss Bridge and the North Truss Bridge. The south one connects the island to Battleford while the north one connects it to North Battleford. The south bridge is open to vehicle traffic while the north one is open to pedestrians only. There is a parking lot on the island for public use.

Recreational opportunities on Finlayson Island are year-round. There are about 14 kilometres (8.7 mi) of trails on the island that are part of the Battlefords River Valley Trails. Activities from the trails include hiking, bird watching, picnicking, and cycling. The trails provide access to the river's edge for fishing and exploring the sand bars. During the winter, the trails are groomed for cross-country skiing. Motorised vehicles are prohibited.

== Flora and fauna ==
The ecosystem of Finlayson Island is that of a riparian environment. A variety of different plants and animals are found on the island with the varying soil types affecting the vegetative cover. The west side of the island is marshy, the centre has sand dunes, and the east side has silty clay. The silty clay retains moisture allowing for a thick cover of trees. There are about 130 different trees, shrubs, and wildflowers on the island.

Trees common to the island include the chokecherry, black birch, and balsam poplar. Plants and shrubs include the yellow cone flower, gaillardia, thistle, various grasses, common juniper, sage, low juniper, red osier, dogwood, buffaloberry, chokeberry, field mint, bear berry, and the silverweed.

Some of the mammals found on Finlayson Island include the great horned owl, white-tailed deer, and the ruffed grouse.

== See also ==
- List of islands of Saskatchewan
- Tourism in Saskatchewan
