= Borden Bridge =

Bridge in Saskatchewan, Canada

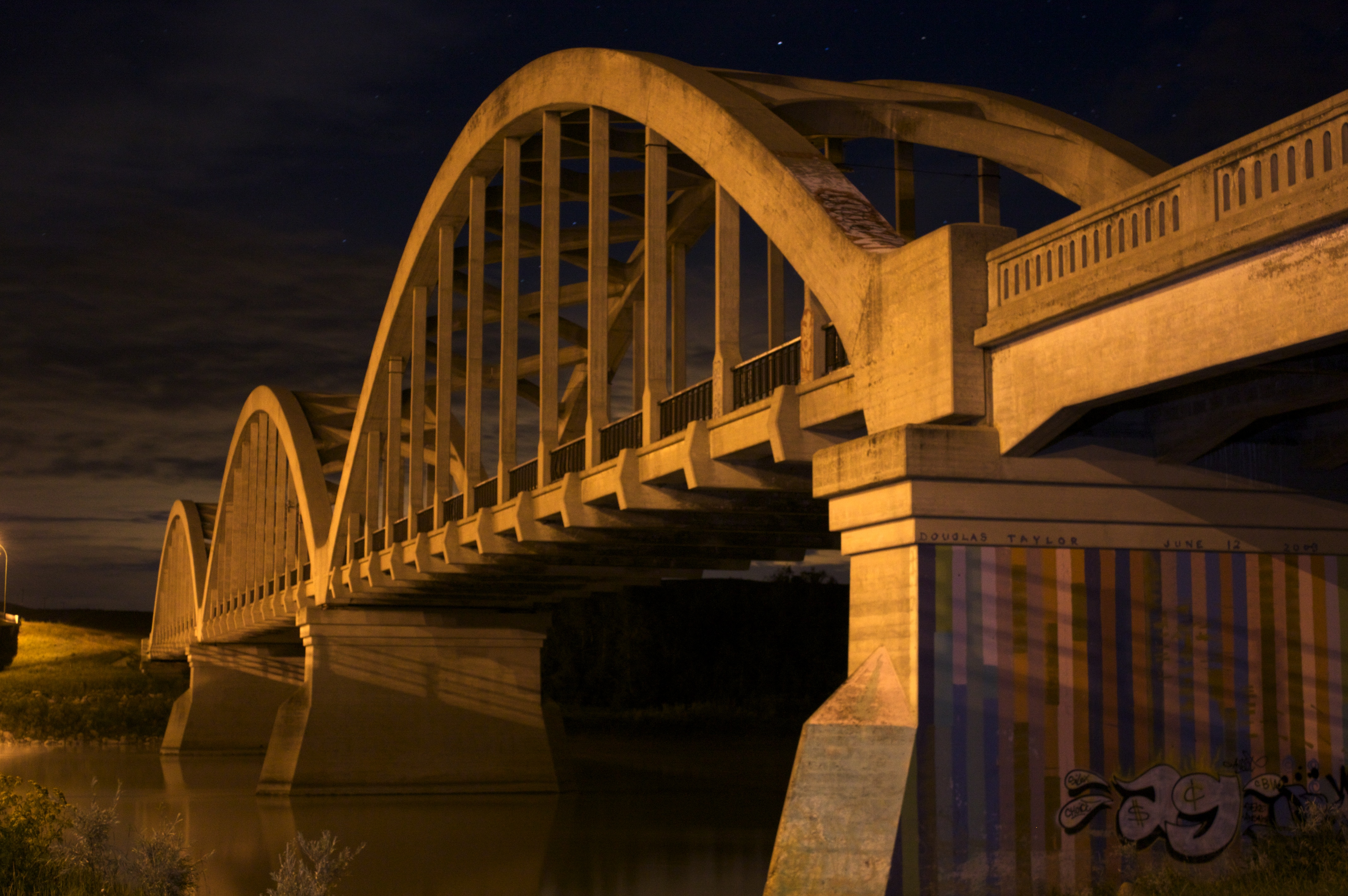
- Coordinates: 52.3730°N 107.1501°W
- Carries: Pedestrians
- Crosses: North Saskatchewan River
- Locale: Corman Park No. 344 / Great Bend No. 405, near Borden, Saskatchewan, Canada
- Official name: Borden Bridge

Characteristics
- Design: Rainbow open arch bridge
- Material: Reinforced concrete

History
- Designer: C.J. Mackenzie
- Opened: November, 1936
- Closed: 1985

Location
- Interactive map of Borden Bridge

Borden Bridge is an abandoned arch bridge that spans across the North Saskatchewan River near Borden, Saskatchewan, Canada. The bridge used to carry vehicular traffic from Saskatchewan Highway 16, but is now open to foot traffic only.

== History ==
The bridge was constructed as a "make-work" project during the Great Depression. It was built in 1936 by the contractor R.J. Arrand Construction Co. and was designed by Chalmers Jack (C. J.) MacKenzie (on leave from being Dean of Engineering at the University of Saskatchewan). Plans from 1929 called for a steel segmental truss bridge, however these were abandoned for a more labour-intensive concrete bridge employing local farmers in the region.

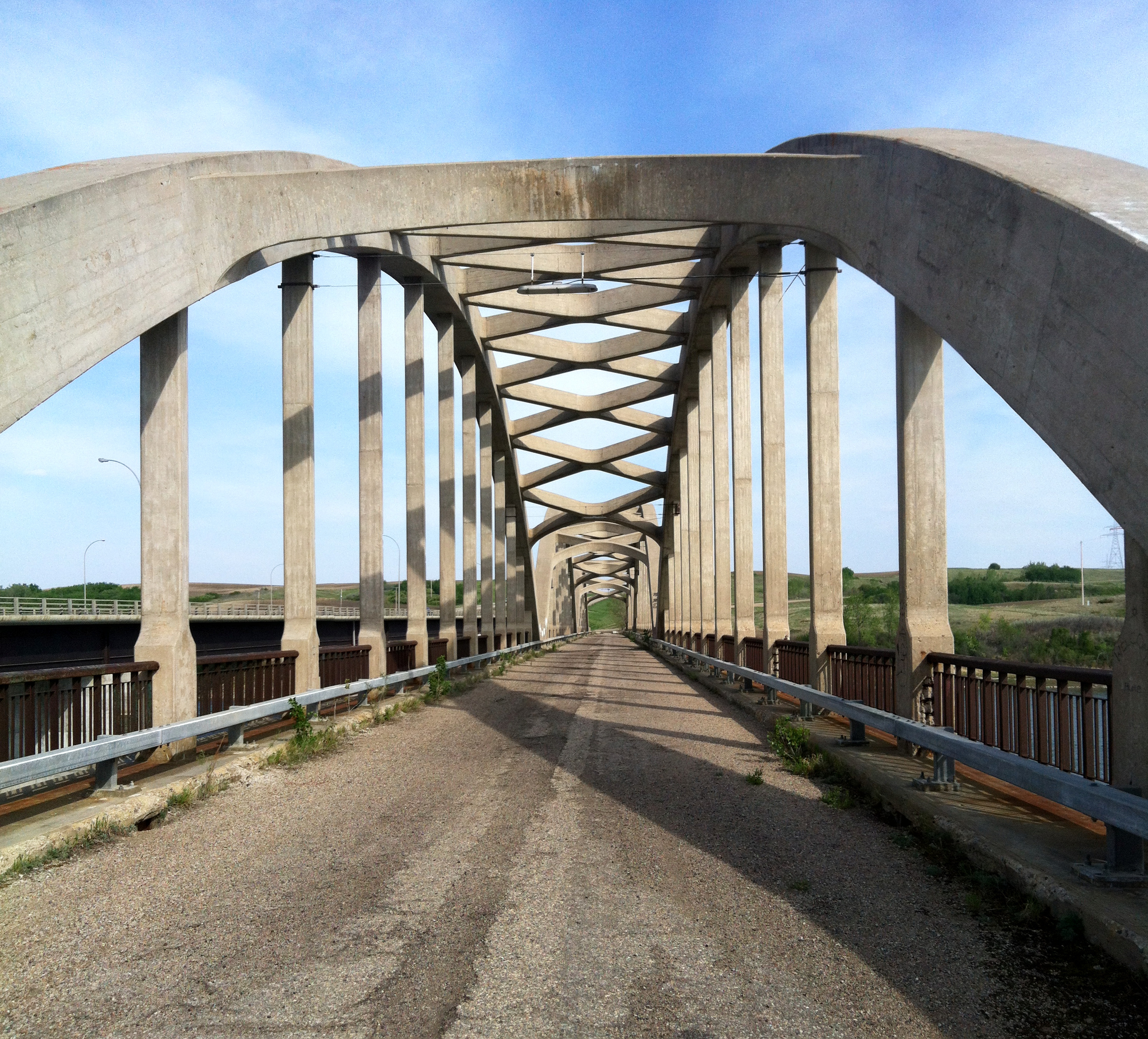
A photo taken from on the deck of the disused Borden Bridge across the North Saskatchewan River.

In 1985, the bridge was closed to vehicles; a newer dual-span bridge built immediately north of the old bridge now carries the highway traffic. In 2007 the bridge was sold by the provincial government to Orville Middleton at a price of $33,000; he indicated that his plans were to turn the bridge into an open-air dance hall. The Saskatchewan Architectural Heritage Society expressed strong concern over this proposed use for the bridge. As of 2012, the bridge still had not been converted because the rural municipality would not approve this use. Middleton stated that he would donate the bridge and surrounding land to the Canadian Wildlife Federation if the dance hall idea would not happen. He also expressed interest in decorating the bridge with some of the salvaged LED lights taken from the Traffic Bridge in Saskatoon. Eight years after buying the bridge, Middleton put it up for sale in 2015 for $1 million, having never been granted approval for his dance hall. As of 2019, the bridge remains unsold.

== See also ==
- List of bridges in Canada
- List of crossings of the North Saskatchewan River
- Borden Bridge Recreation Site
