= Highgate, Saskatchewan =

Highgate
- Unincorporated area
- Location of Highgate in Saskatchewan
- Coordinates: 52°52′0″N 108°25′0″W
- Country: Canada
- Province: Saskatchewan
- Rural Municipalities (R.M.): Battle River No. 438, Saskatchewan
- Post office Founded: 1919-1971
- Village established: not large enough

Government
  - Mayor: Part of the RM municipal affairs
  - Summer (DST): CST

Highgate, Saskatchewan is an unincorporated area in the rural municipality of Battle River No. 438, Saskatchewan, in the Canadian province of Saskatchewan. Highgate is located on Saskatchewan Highway 16, the Yellowhead in north western Saskatchewan. Highgate siding, a railroad siding and post office first opened in 1919 at the legal land description of Sec.17, Twp.45, R.17, W3. The population is smaller than a hamlet, and is counted within the RM. Highgate is located just north west of North Battleford, Saskatchewan.

== See also ==
- List of communities in Saskatchewan
- List of rural municipalities in Saskatchewan
