= Stonyview =

Locality in Saskatchewan, Canada

Stonyview is an unincorporated locality in the rural municipality of Insinger No. 275, in the Canadian province of Saskatchewan. Stony View is located 10 km north of Highway 746 & south of Highway 5 on Township road 310 in eastern Saskatchewan.

== See also ==
- List of communities in Saskatchewan
- List of rural municipalities in Saskatchewan
