= Battleford Bridge =

Bridge in Saskatchewan, Canada

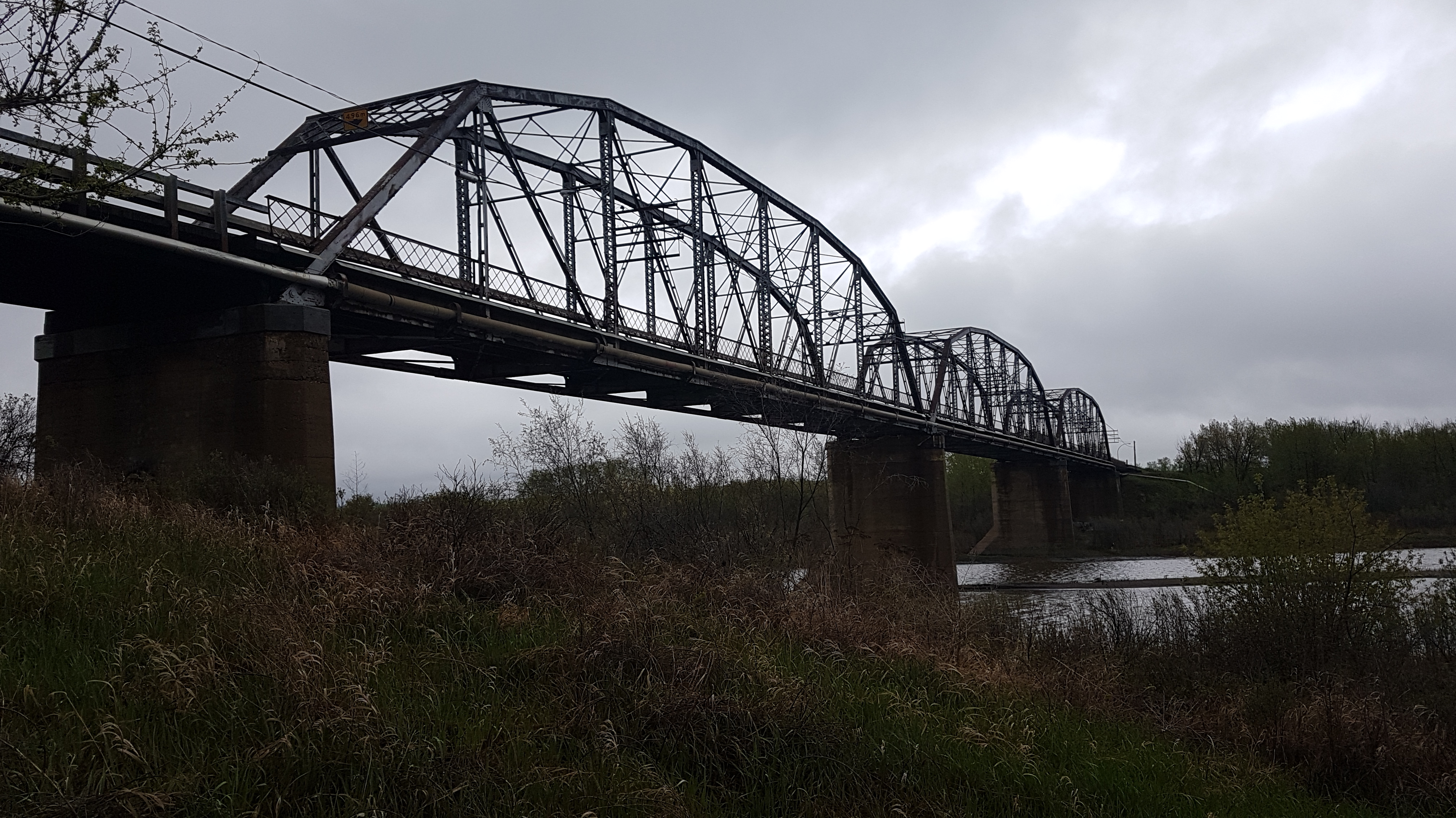
- Battleford Bridge
- Coordinates: 52.74423°N 108.28170°W
- Carries: Motor vehicles (south bridge) and pedestrians (north bridge)
- Crosses: North Saskatchewan River
- Locale: The Battlefords
- Begins: Town of Battleford
- Ends: City of North Battleford
- Other name(s): The Old Bridges
- Owner: Town of Battleford
- Maintained by: Associated Engineering
- Next upstream: Battlefords Bridge
- Next downstream: Maymont Bridge

Characteristics
- Design: Truss
- Material: Steel
- Total length: 609.6 m (2,000 ft)
- Longest span: 5
- No. of spans: 8
- No. of lanes: 2

History
- Construction start: 1907
- Construction end: 1908
- Opened: 1908
- Closed: 2003
- Replaced by: Battledords Bridge

The Battleford Bridge, also known as the Old Bridges, is an eight-span steel truss bridge that crosses the North Saskatchewan River connecting North Battleford and Battleford in the Canadian province of Saskatchewan. Built in 1907–08, the bridge consists of two separate bridges — one from Battleford to Finlayson Island in the middle of the river and the other from Finlayson Island to North Battleford. The south bridge is commonly called the South Truss Bridge while the north one is called the North Truss Bridge. It is the oldest highway bridge in Saskatchewan and the longest of its type. The bridge was along the route of Highway 16 (Yellowhead Highway) and then Highway 16A until it was closed to through traffic in 2003. Highway 16 now crosses the river upstream at the Battlefords Bridge and 16A was decommissioned with the closing of Battleford Bridge. In 2003, the bridge was bought by the town of Battleford and is maintained by Associated Engineering.

No longer an important highway bridge, the Battleford Bridge now provides access to Finlayson Island. The South Truss Bridge (from Battleford) has been rehabilitated to allow public motor vehicles access to the island. The North Truss Bridge, which was in worse condition, was rehabilitated to allow pedestrians and cyclists, but no cars, to the island. The north bridge is also called the Finlayson Island Pedestrian Bridge. Finlayson Island is a recreational island with hiking trails and picnic areas.

== Description ==
Battleford Bridge consists of two separate steel Parker through-truss bridges. The South Truss Bridge, at 231.6 metres (760 ft) long, is a three-span bridge that connects Battleford to Finlayson Island. The North Truss Bridge, at 393.2 metres (1,290 ft) long, has five spans connecting it to Finlayson Island from North Battleford. The main span, found on the north bridge, is 76.2 metres (250 ft) long. The total length, not including the roadway on the island, is 609.6 metres (2,000 ft).

== Rehabiltation ==
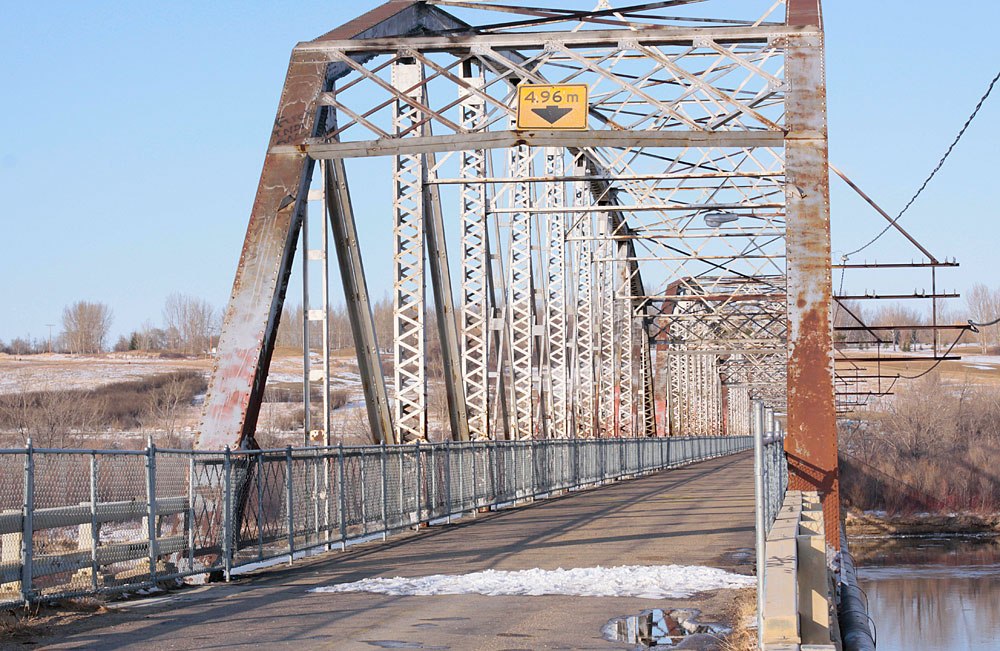
Battleford Bridge

After the Battleford Bridge was closed to through highway traffic in 2003, the town of Battleford bought it and hired Associated Engineering to monitor and maintain it. In 2013, Associated Engineering inspected the bridge and determined that concrete needed to be repaired and some of the re-enforced steel needed to be replaced. Vector Construction was hired at a cost of $100,000 to do the work. A 10-year management plan was initiated by Associated Engineering in 2018 for the financial planning of operations, maintenance, and rehabilitation of the bridge.

In July 2020, the north Battleford Bridge was closed due to structural concerns because of "unexpectedly high water levels from heavy rainfall in early July" that caused erosion. The south bridge, however, remained open. During the summer 2021, the north bridge was temporarily re-opened to pedestrians after some upgrades and improvements.

Rehabilitation of the north bridge began in 2022 following recommendations from Associated Engineering. The town of Battleford awarded Hipperson Construction of Regina the contract to repair the bridge. The total cost to repair the bridge was $3.6 million, which was split between the three levels of government. Work done to the north bridge included reshaping the eroded bridge abutment slope, increasing the length of the jump span, and new guardrails. Work on the south bridge included installing new guardrails and being upgraded to carry heavier loads. The bridge rehabilitation project was finished in June 2023.

== See also ==
- List of crossings of the North Saskatchewan River
- List of bridges in Canada
