= Sheho =

Village in Saskatchewan, Canada

- Village
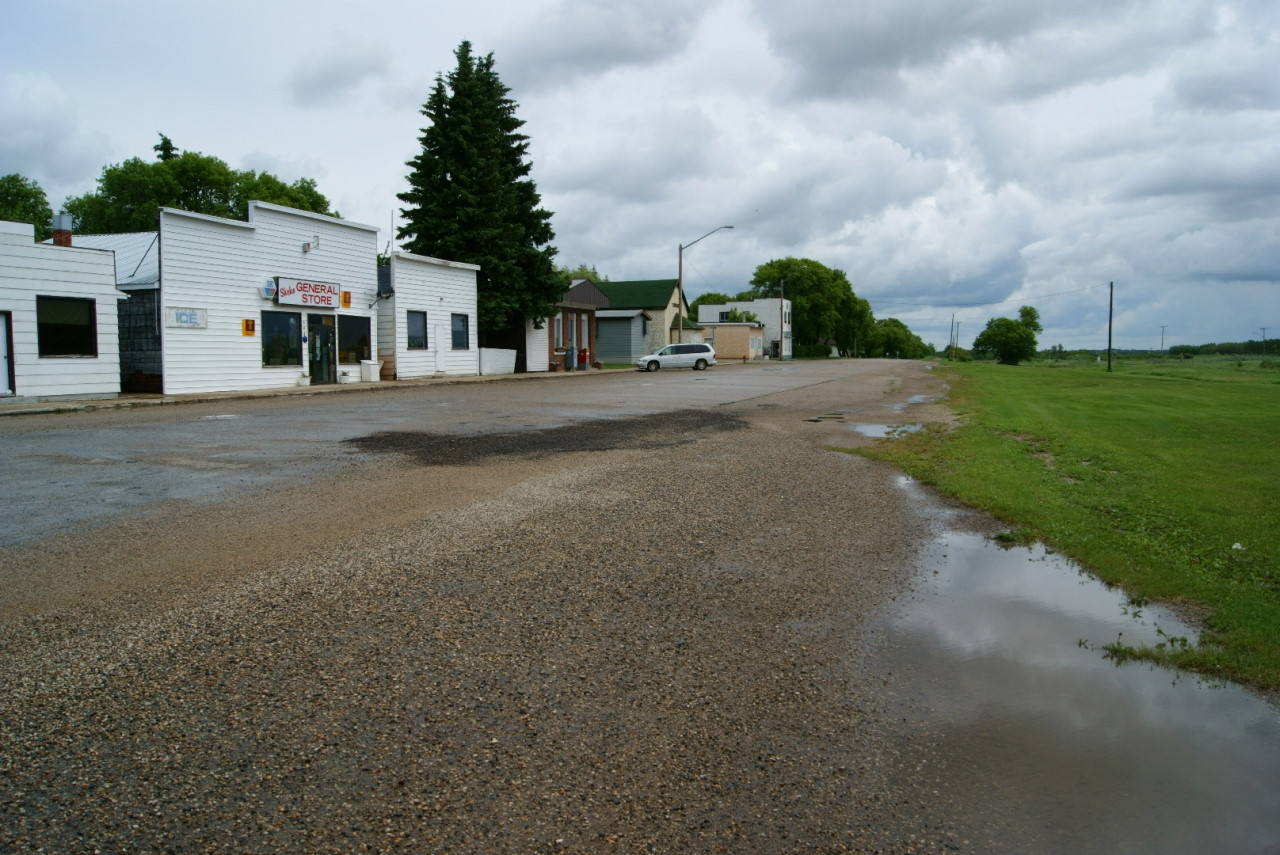
- Main Street

- Location of Sheho, in Saskatchewan Sheho (Canada)
- Coordinates: 51°35′0″N 103°13′0″W
- Country: Canada
- Province: Saskatchewan
- Rural Municipalities (RM): Insinger No. 275
- Post office Founded Sheho Lake: 1891-11-01
- Post office name change to Sheho: 1892-09-01

Area
  - Total: 1.95 km^{2} (0.75 sq mi)
  - Density: 62/km^{2} (160/sq mi)
  - Summer (DST): CST

Sheho (2016 population: 105) is a village in the Canadian province of Saskatchewan within the Rural Municipality of Insinger No. 275 and Census Division No. 9. Sheho is located on Highway 16 (the Yellowhead Highway), in southeast Saskatchewan between Foam Lake to the west and Yorkton to the east. Sheho Lake post office first opened in 1891 at the legal land description of Sec.28, Twp.30, R.9, W2 before moving slightly and changing name to Sheho.

== History ==
Sheho incorporated as a village on June 30, 1905.

== Demographics ==
Population history (1981–2016)
Year	Pop.	±%
1981	285	—
1986	258	−9.5%
1991	212	−17.8%
1996	181	−14.6%
2001	148	−18.2%
2006	121	−18.2%
2011	130	+7.4%
2016	105	−19.2%
Source: Statistics Canada via Saskatchewan Bureau of Statistics

In the 2021 Census of Population conducted by Statistics Canada, Sheho had a population of 122 living in 70 of its 79 total private dwellings, a change of 16.2% from its 2016 population of 105. With a land area of 1.88 km^{2} (0.73 sq mi), it had a population density of 64.9/km^{2} (168.1/sq mi) in 2021.

In the 2016 Census of Population, the Village of Sheho recorded a population of 105 living in 59 of its 88 total private dwellings, a −23.8% change from its 2011 population of 130. With a land area of 1.95 km^{2} (0.75 sq mi), it had a population density of 53.8/km^{2} (139.5/sq mi) in 2016.

== See also ==
- List of communities in Saskatchewan
- List of villages in Saskatchewan
