= Delmas, Saskatchewan =

Community in Saskatchewan, Canada

Delmas
- Organized Hamlet
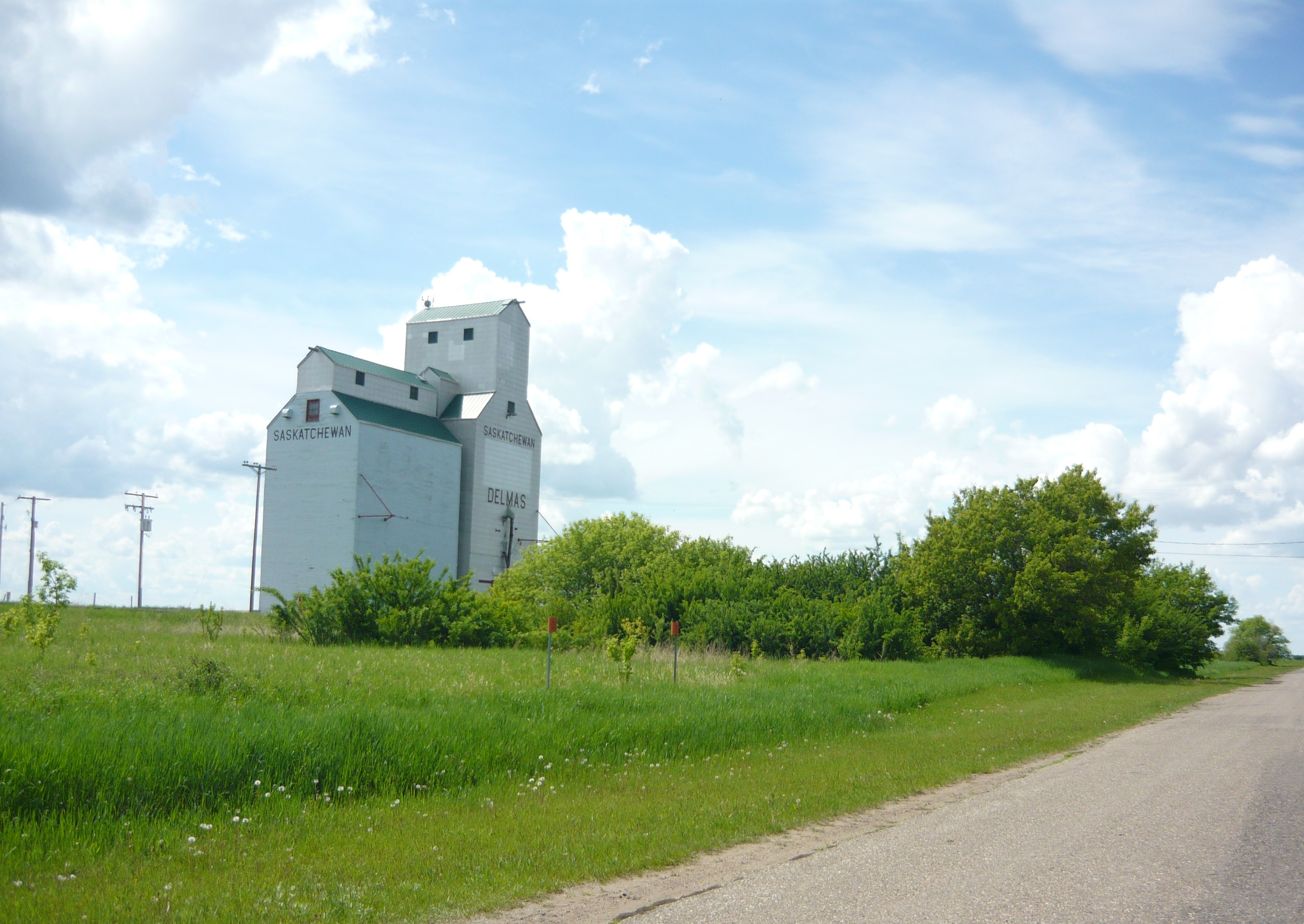
- Former Saskatchewan Wheat Pool grain elevator along Railway Street

- Location within Saskatchewan Location within Canada
- Coordinates: 52°55′44″N 108°36′18″W
- Country: Canada
- Province: Saskatchewan
- Region: West Central Saskatchewan
- Census division: 12
- Rural Municipality: Battle River No. 438

Government
  - Governing body: Delmas Council

Area
  - Land: 0.39 km^{2} (0.15 sq mi)

Population (2016)
  - Total: 128
  - Density: 325.6/km^{2} (843/sq mi)
- Time zone: UTC-6 (CST)
- Area code: 306
- Highways: Highway 16
- Railways: Canadian National Railway

Delmas is a hamlet in the Rural Municipality of Battle River No. 438, Saskatchewan, Canada. Listed as a designated place by Statistics Canada, the hamlet had a population of 128 in the Canada 2016 Census. The hamlet is located approximately 32.6 kilometres (20.3 mi) west of North Battleford on Highway 16.

== Demographics ==
In the 2021 Census of Population conducted by Statistics Canada, Delmas had a population of 103 living in 47 of its 51 total private dwellings, a change of −19.5% from its 2016 population of 128. With a land area of 0.47 km^{2} (0.18 sq mi), it had a population density of 219.1/km^{2} (567.6/sq mi) in 2021.

Canada census – Delmas, Saskatchewan community profile

	2016
Population	129 (+ 15.3% from 2011)
Land area	0.39 km^{2} (0.15 sq mi)
Population density	325.6/km^{2} (843/sq mi)
Median age	40.7 (M: 40.4, F: 41.5)
Private dwellings	50 (total)
Median household income	$N/A

References: 2016

== See also ==
- List of communities in Saskatchewan
- List of hamlets in Saskatchewan
