= Borden, Saskatchewan =

Village in Saskatchewan, Canada

Borden
- Village
- Village of Borden
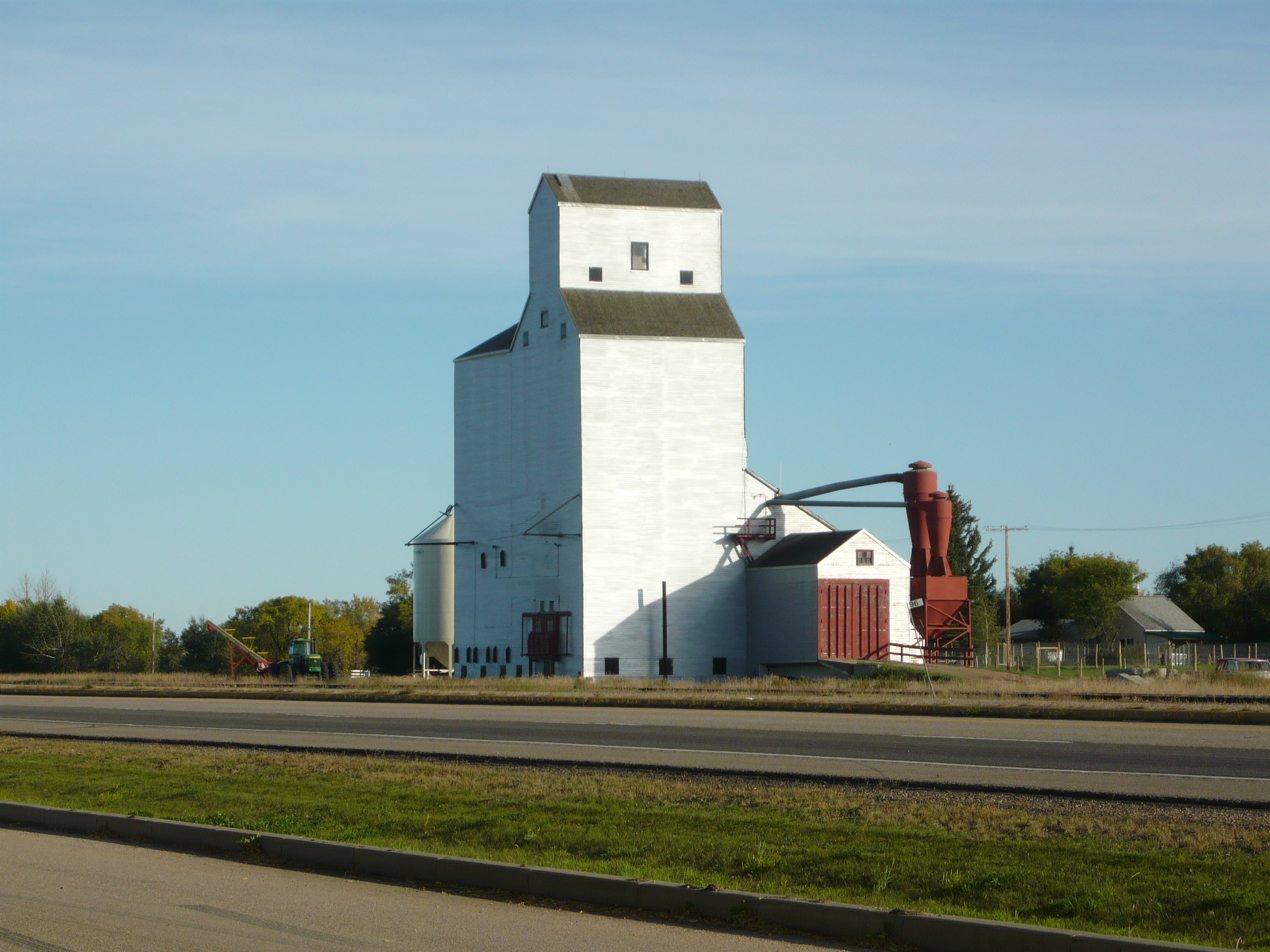
- Grain elevator in Borden.

- Location within Saskatchewan Location within Canada
- Coordinates: 52.413°N 107.222°W
- Country: Canada
- Province: Saskatchewan
- Region: Saskatchewan
- Census division: 16
- Rural Municipality: Great Bend No. 405
- Post office Founded: 1905
- Incorporated (Village): 1907
- Fire Dept.: 1941

Government
  - Type: Municipal
  - Governing body: Borden Village Council
  - Mayor: Jamie Brandrick
  - Administrator: Carly Hess

Area
  - Total: 0.76 km^{2} (0.29 sq mi)

Population (2021)
  - Total: 312
  - Density: 378.5/km^{2} (980/sq mi)
- Time zone: UTC-6 (CST)
- Postal code: S0K 0N0
- Area code: 306
- Highways: Highway 16; Highway 685
- Railways: Canadian National Railway
- Website: Village of Borden

Borden (2021 population: 312) is a village in the Canadian province of Saskatchewan within the Rural Municipality of Great Bend No. 405 and Census Division No. 16. Borden is named after Sir Frederick William Borden, Minister of Militia in the Laurier Cabinet. An abandoned arch bridge with the same name (Borden Bridge) is located to the southeast and was once used to carry Highway 16 across the North Saskatchewan River.

== History ==
Borden incorporated as a village on July 19, 1907.

== Demographics ==
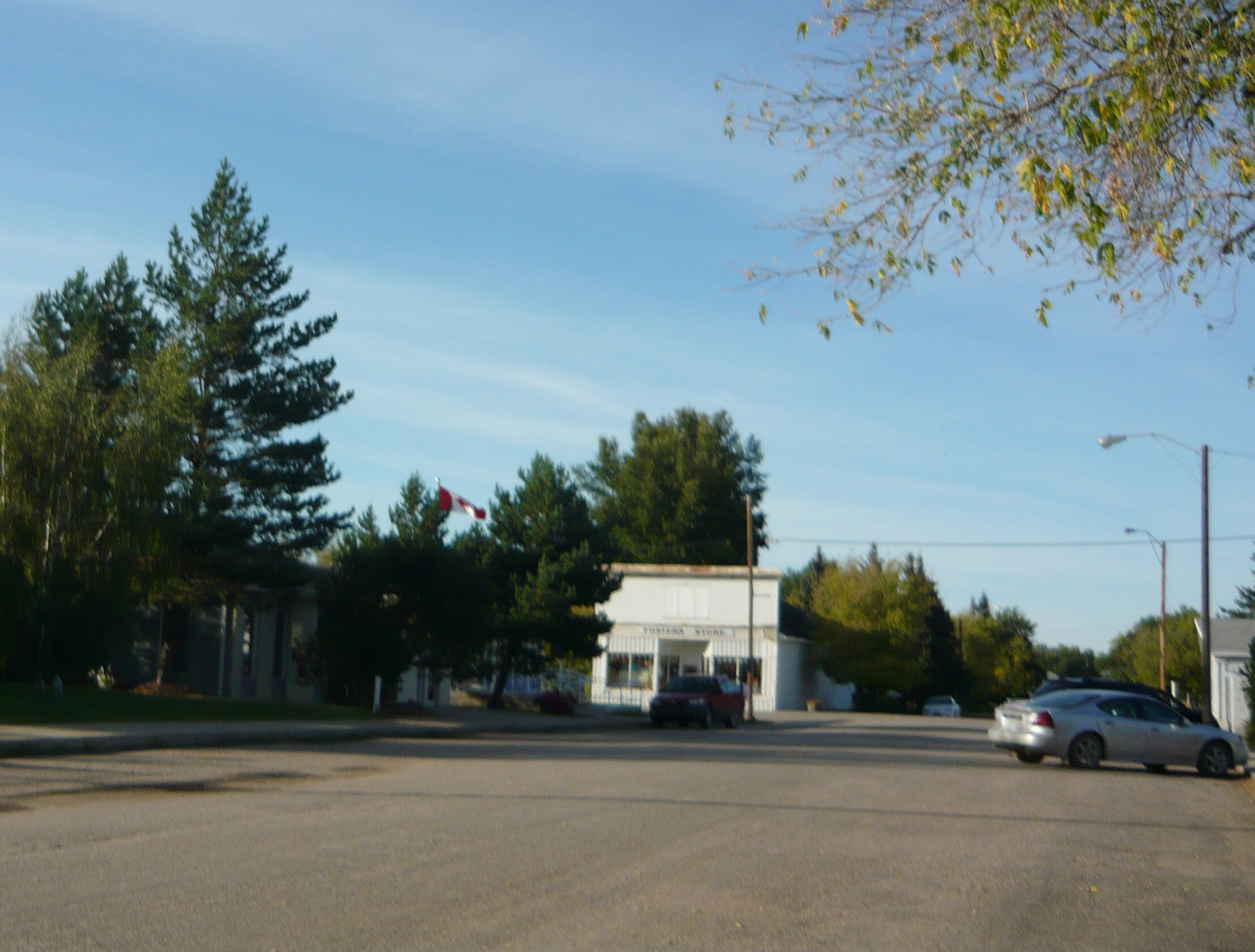
Business district, Shepard Street and First Avenue

Population history (1981–2016)
Year	Pop.	±%
1981	197	—
1986	191	−3.0%
1991	215	+12.6%
1996	217	+0.9%
2001	225	+3.7%
2006	223	−0.9%
2011	245	+9.9%
2016	287	+17.1%
Source: Statistics Canada via Saskatchewan Bureau of Statistics

In the 2021 Census of Population conducted by Statistics Canada, Borden had a population of 312 living in 120 of its 131 total private dwellings, a change of −2.1% from its 2016 population of 287. With a land area of 0.73 km^{2} (0.28 sq mi), it had a population density of 384.9/km^{2} (997.0/sq mi) in 2021.

In the 2016 Census of Population, the Village of Borden recorded a population of 287 living in 126 of its 140 total private dwellings, a 14.6% change from its 2011 population of 245. With a land area of 0.76 km^{2} (0.29 sq mi), it had a population density of 377.6/km^{2} (978.1/sq mi) in 2016.

== Notable people ==
- David Buckingham, politician.
- Savannah Sutherland, is a 400 m Olympic hurdler.

== See also ==
- List of communities in Saskatchewan
- List of villages in Saskatchewan
