= Langenburg, Saskatchewan =

Town in Saskatchewan, Canada

Langenburg
- Town
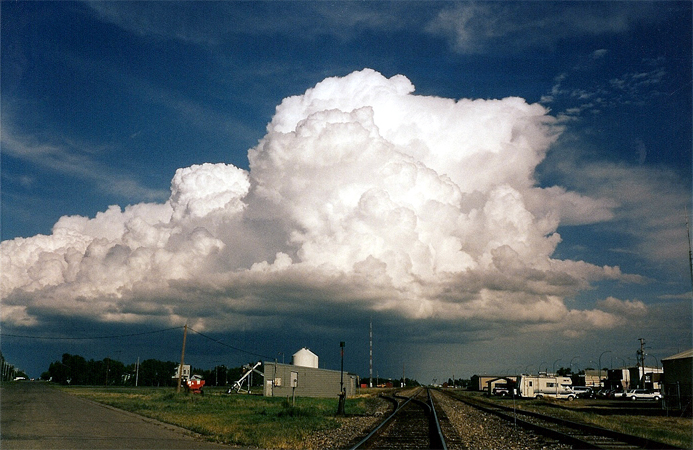
- View to the east along the tracks
- Motto(s): Community and Economy Growing Together
- Location within Saskatchewan Location within Canada
- Coordinates: 50°50′N 101°42′W
- Country: Canada
- Province: Saskatchewan
- Rural Municipalities (RM): Langenburg
- Post office founded: 1 February 1888
- Village established: 1 April 1903
- Town incorporated: 15 September 1959

Government
  - Mayor: Jeff Farmer
  - Federal Electoral District M.P.: Cathay Wagantall
  - Provincial Constituency MLA: Warren Kaeding

Population (2016)
  - Total: 1,165
- Time zone: UTC−6 (CST)
- Postal code: S0A 2A0
- Area code: 306
- Website: langenburg.ca

Langenburg /ˈlændʒənbɜːrɡ/ is a town (population of 1,048) in the Rural Municipality of Langenburg No. 181, located within the Saskatchewan Association of Rural Municipalities SARM Division No. 1 and Census Division No. 5, in the Canadian province of Saskatchewan.

Langenburg lies on the Yellowhead Highway (Highway 16) in the southeastern part of the province, 15 km west of the Manitoba border, at the junction with Highway 8. The nearest city is Yorkton located 70 km northwest along Highway 16.

== Early history ==
What later became the Langenburg district was surveyed by the federal government in 1880. British settlers were already established to the northeast of present-day Marchwell in the Wolverine district in the early part of the decade. Settlers of predominantly German origin began to arrive in the Langenburg area in the mid-1880s, attracted by the lure of free homesteads granted by the federal government and a promise of freedom and prosperity. The original community was called "Colony Hohenlohe" after Prince Hohenlohe von Langenburg, a German nobleman who had visited western Canada in 1883 and subsequently recommended it to German emigrants as more suitable destination than the United States. In the winter of 1886–87 the Manitoba & North-Western Railway reached the area and a station named "Langenburg" was established. By 1888 the small colony could boast of a store with a post office. A year earlier, in September 1887, the Langenburg School District No. 105 had been established but it was not until August 1889 that funds to build a school were secured. When the school house opened in May 1890 there were about 40 resident ratepayers in the community and nine students on the rolls, rising a short time later to 13.
There was little growth over the following decade. In 1899 an application to become incorporated as a village was unsuccessful—the number of permanent dwellings required for incorporation was 15 and there were only five. In 1902, however, a new wave of immigration began with Scandinavian settlers arriving from the United States, and by April 1903 Langenburg had gained its village status.

== Law and government ==
The citizens of Langenburg are represented by a town council which includes the mayor, an alderman, and five councillors. The current council members are Mayor Lorrie Popp, Councillor Tanner Hunt, Councillor JoAnn Mcdonell, Councillor Jeff Farmer, Councillor Rodney Lungren, Councillor Brad Sicinski. Council meetings are held on the first and third Tuesdays of the month.

Langenburg is located in the provincial constituency of Melville-Saltcoats. The most recent election of MLAs took place on Wednesday, October 26, 2020 and Warren Kaeding of the Saskatchewan Party was re-elected.

- The current Member of Parliament representing Langenburg as part of the federal electoral district of Yorkton—Melville is Cathay Wagantall, who was first elected to represent the district in 2015. She is a member of the Conservative Party of Canada.

== Economy ==
Agriculture and other resource-based industries, principally the Mosaic Company's K1 and K2 potash mines located near the town of Esterhazy, provide employment for 25% of the active labour force in the community. A further 19% are employed in the wholesale and retail sector, 18% in educational, health care and social services, 7% in finance and real estate and business services generally, while 5% work in construction and manufacturing. Other services account for the remaining 24%.

There are a wide variety of services currently available in the Langenburg area. Permanent services include the post office, ambulance and health care (medical and the Care Home), R.C.M.P., fire, Senior rental units and schools. Other services include a number of retail outlets and services. There is a movie theatre, library, fitness centre, liquor store, and a veterinary clinic. Service clubs include the Lions & Lioness, the Arts Council, Friends and Family Foundation, Langenburg Community Development Board and Fish & Game. There are five churches with active congregations: St Paul's Lutheran, Christ Lutheran, St. Joseph's Catholic, Langenburg Evangelical Fellowship, and the United Church of Canada.

== Demographics ==
In the 2021 Census of Population conducted by Statistics Canada, Langenburg had a population of 1,228 living in 510 of its 567 total private dwellings, a change of 5.4% from its 2016 population of 1,165. With a land area of 3.38 km^{2} (1.31 sq mi), it had a population density of 363.3/km^{2} (941.0/sq mi) in 2021.

Canada census – Langenburg community profile

	2021	2011
Population	1,228 (+5.4% from 2016)	1,148 (9.5% from 2006)
Land area	3.38 km^{2} (1.31 sq mi)	3.46 km^{2} (1.34 sq mi)
Population density	362.8/km^{2} (940/sq mi)	332.2/km^{2} (860/sq mi)
Median age	40.8 (M: 38.4, F: 43.2)	47.9 (M: 46.3, F: 50.8)
Private dwellings	567 (total) 510 (occupied)	531 (total)
Median household income	$90,000	$86,370†

References: 2021 2011

== Parks and recreation ==
- Langenburg Recreation Site
- Carlton Trail Regional Park and Golf Course is located 18 km south of Langenburg on No. 8 Highway.

== Education ==
Langenburg has one education centre for students: Langenburg Central School, from Pre K to 12.

== Media ==
The Four-Town Journal newspaper covers Langenburg and its surrounding area. The Company was established by Bill Johnston in 1980 and was purchased by Ryan Stanko in 2019.

== Sports teams ==
The Langenburg Warriors played in the Triangle Hockey League for fourteen seasons and finished fifth in the 2018-2019 regular season. The team joined the North Central Hockey League the following season, and then moved on to the newly established Sask East Hockey League in 2020-21.

Langenburg also has a minor ball program that fields teams from T-ball to Midget age divisions as well as a soccer program (Langenburg United Soccer Organization). Langenburg High School is home to the Langenburg Eagles competing against teams in and around the province in sports such as: Volleyball, Basketball, Track and Field, Badminton, Curling, and Golf.

== Climate ==
Climate data for Langenburg
Month	Jan	Feb	Mar	Apr	May	Jun	Jul	Aug	Sep	Oct	Nov	Dec	Year
Record high °C (°F)	7 (45)	10 (50)	22 (72)	28 (82)	34 (93)	37 (99)	37.8 (100.0)	37.8 (100.0)	32 (90)	32 (90)	22.2 (72.0)	11.5 (52.7)	37.8 (100.0)
Mean daily maximum °C (°F)	−12.9 (8.8)	−9.1 (15.6)	−1.9 (28.6)	8.4 (47.1)	17.5 (63.5)	22.0 (71.6)	24.0 (75.2)	23.6 (74.5)	17.1 (62.8)	10.0 (50.0)	−2.7 (27.1)	−10.3 (13.5)	7.2 (45.0)
Daily mean °C (°F)	−18 (0)	−14.3 (6.3)	−7 (19)	2.7 (36.9)	10.7 (51.3)	15.7 (60.3)	17.6 (63.7)	16.7 (62.1)	10.7 (51.3)	4.1 (39.4)	−7 (19)	−14.8 (5.4)	1.4 (34.5)
Mean daily minimum °C (°F)	−23 (−9)	−19.4 (−2.9)	−12.1 (10.2)	−2.9 (26.8)	3.9 (39.0)	9.4 (48.9)	11.1 (52.0)	9.7 (49.5)	4.2 (39.6)	−1.9 (28.6)	−11.2 (11.8)	−19.3 (−2.7)	−4.3 (24.3)
Record low °C (°F)	−45.6 (−50.1)	−43.9 (−47.0)	−41.7 (−43.1)	−28.3 (−18.9)	−8.9 (16.0)	−2.8 (27.0)	0 (32)	−1.1 (30.0)	−10 (14)	−23 (−9)	−38 (−36)	−42.5 (−44.5)	−45.6 (−50.1)
Average precipitation mm (inches)	23.4 (0.92)	16.6 (0.65)	25.4 (1.00)	22.7 (0.89)	48.1 (1.89)	76.7 (3.02)	72.1 (2.84)	65.6 (2.58)	48.8 (1.92)	24.9 (0.98)	20.4 (0.80)	20.8 (0.82)	465.4 (18.32)
Source: Environment Canada

== Notable people ==
- Kelly Buchberger, former National Hockey League player and current the head coach of the Tri City Americans of the Western Hockey League (WHL)
- Jess Moskaluke, a Canadian country pop singer who won Female Artist of the Year for the Canadian Country Music Awards in 2015.

== See also ==
- List of communities in Saskatchewan

== Published works ==
- Adams, Irene and Johnson, Gilbert. Walk Back Through Time. 1980. Saskatoon: Modern Press, 1980.
- Adams, Irene, ed. One Hundred Years in the Fellowship of the Holy Spirit. 1989. Langenburg: St. Paul's Evangelical Lutheran Church, 1989.
- Schaab, Mary, ed. Our Heritage. 1997. Langenburg: The Langenburg and District Book Committee, 1997.
