= Rural Municipality of North Battleford No. 437 =

Rural municipality in Saskatchewan, Canada

North Battleford No. 437
- Rural municipality
- Rural Municipality of North Battleford No. 437

- Location of the RM of North Battleford No. 437 in Saskatchewan
- Coordinates: 52.760°N 108.228°W
- Country: Canada
- Province: Saskatchewan
- Census division: 16
- SARM division: 6
- Formed: December 12, 1910

Government
  - Reeve: Dan Bartko
  - Governing body: RM of North Battleford No. 437 Council
  - Administrator: Debbie Arsenault
  - Office location: North Battleford

Area (2016)
  - Land: 797.2 km^{2} (307.8 sq mi)

Population (2016)
  - Total: 725
  - Density: 0.9/km^{2} (2.3/sq mi)
- Time zone: CST
  - Summer (DST): CST
- Area codes: 306 and 639

The Rural Municipality of North Battleford No. 437 (2016 population: 725) is a rural municipality (RM) in the Canadian province of Saskatchewan within Census Division No. 16 and SARM Division No. 6. Located in the west-central portion of the province, it comprises the rural area generally to the north and east of the City of North Battleford.

== History ==
The RM of North Battleford No. 437 incorporated as a rural municipality on December 12, 1910.

== Geography ==
=== Communities and localities ===
The following unincorporated communities are within the RM.

Localities

- Brada

== Demographics ==
Population history (1981–2016)
Year	Pop.	±%
1981	1,107	—
1986	1,075	−2.9%
1991	1,036	−3.6%
1996	984	−5.0%
2001	1,078	+9.6%
2006	737	−31.6%
2011	733	−0.5%
2016	725	−1.1%
Source: Statistics Canada via Saskatchewan Bureau of Statistics

In the 2021 Census of Population conducted by Statistics Canada, the RM of North Battleford No. 437 had a population of 687 living in 262 of its 288 total private dwellings, a change of −5.2% from its 2016 population of 725. With a land area of 792.18 km^{2} (305.86 sq mi), it had a population density of 0.9/km^{2} (2.2/sq mi) in 2021.

In the 2016 Census of Population, the RM of North Battleford No. 437 recorded a population of 725 living in 276 of its 290 total private dwellings, a −1.1% change from its 2011 population of 733. With a land area of 797.2 km^{2} (307.8 sq mi), it had a population density of 0.9/km^{2} (2.4/sq mi) in 2016.

== Government ==
The RM of North Battleford No. 437 is governed by an elected municipal council and an appointed administrator that meets on the second Wednesday of every month. The reeve of the RM is Dan Bartko while its administrator is Debbie Arsenault. The RM's office is located in North Battleford.

== Infrastructure ==
The North Battleford Energy Centre, a 260 MW generating station, was built by Northland Power in the RM.
