= Paynton =

Village in Saskatchewan, Canada

- Village
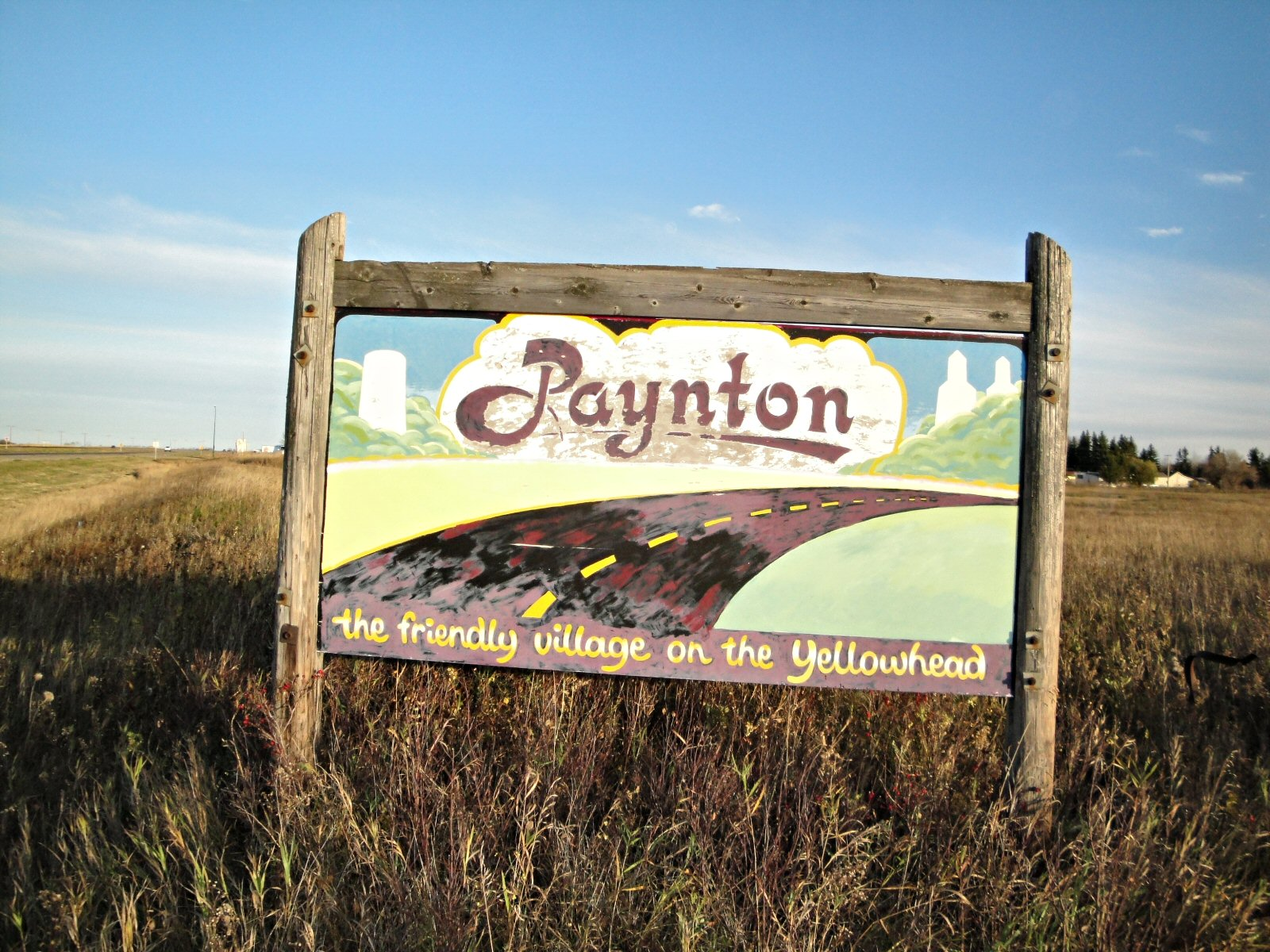

- Location of Paynton Paynton (Canada)
- Coordinates: 53°00′46″N 108°56′11″W
- Country: Canada
- Province: Saskatchewan
- Census division: 17
- Rural Municipality: Paynton
- Post office founded: 1904
- Incorporated (village): 1907

Government
  - Mayor: David Pelletier
  - Administrator: Stephanie Knorr
  - Governing body: Paynton Village Council

Area
  - Total: 0.85 km^{2} (0.33 sq mi)

Population (2021)
  - Total: 120
  - Density: 177.5/km^{2} (460/sq mi)
- Time zone: UTC−07:00 (MST)
  - Summer (DST): UTC−06:00 (MDT)
- Postal code: S0M 2J0
- Area code: 306
- Highways: Highway 16; Highway 674

Paynton (2016 population: 148) is a village in the Canadian province of Saskatchewan within the Rural Municipality of Paynton No. 470 and Census Division No. 17.

== History ==
Paynton incorporated as a village on May 2, 1907.

The first settlers of Paynton district were the Cinnamon family. This large family came down the North Saskatchewan River on a barge landing at the only suitable outlet along the bank. This outlet is now known as Cinnamon Landing.

Other pioneers, Mr. Paynter and Mr. McCready, Mr. Grafton and Mr. Fields, arrived in this district after a long trek from Fort Macleod. They were all RCMP Officers and came around the Riel Rebellion of 1885. They homesteaded a farm and were the first to put up a fence which was done with rails. After some time, Mr. McCready died after being thrown from his horse.

Widowed Mrs. McCready left Paynton and moved Winnipeg. She later returned and married Mr. Paynter. He was noted for his kindness to strangers as well as his neighbours. He then retired from the RCMP and spent his remaining days assisting newcomers to the Paynton area.

The area locals wanted to name the settlement "Paynter" but Mr. Peter Paynter would not agree to this. He wanted some of his friends to be included in the name. There was also another place already called "Paynter". They decided to take the last letters from Grafton and create the village known as Paynton. In 1912 Paynton boasted of Dr. McKay, nurse Katie McKay, druggist Alex McKay, Eddie Langlais grocery store, K.E. Mahafey's general store, and Jim Bones general store, two hotels, a bakeshop, bank, poolroom, butcher shop, hall and our own Paynton newspaper. Also there was a lumber yard as well as two churches (Anglican and Presbyterian). Shows came to the hall periodically.

A Post Office built by postmaster John Currie in 1967 and opened January 17, 1968.

== Demographics ==
Population history (1981–2016)
Year	Pop.	±%
1981	210	—
1986	221	+5.2%
1991	182	−17.6%
1996	161	−11.5%
2001	172	+6.8%
2006	151	−12.2%
2011	151	+0.0%
2016	148	−2.0%
Source: Statistics Canada via Saskatchewan Bureau of Statistics

In the 2021 Census of Population conducted by Statistics Canada, Paynton had a population of 120 living in 62 of its 67 total private dwellings, a change of −18.9% from its 2016 population of 148. With a land area of 0.82 km^{2} (0.32 sq mi), it had a population density of 146.3/km^{2} (379.0/sq mi) in 2021.

In the 2016 Census of Population, the Village of Paynton recorded a population of 148 living in 67 of its 86 total private dwellings, a −2% change from its 2011 population of 151. With a land area of 0.85 km^{2} (0.33 sq mi), it had a population density of 174.1/km^{2} (451.0/sq mi) in 2016.

== Climate ==
Climate data for Paynton
Month	Jan	Feb	Mar	Apr	May	Jun	Jul	Aug	Sep	Oct	Nov	Dec	Year
Record high °C (°F)	9.0 (48.2)	10 (50)	16.5 (61.7)	31.7 (89.1)	36.0 (96.8)	36.5 (97.7)	35.0 (95.0)	39.0 (102.2)	34.0 (93.2)	28.5 (83.3)	19.4 (66.9)	9.0 (48.2)	39.0 (102.2)
Mean daily maximum °C (°F)	−11.6 (11.1)	−8.4 (16.9)	−0.8 (30.6)	10.4 (50.7)	18.7 (65.7)	22.3 (72.1)	24.3 (75.7)	23.9 (75.0)	17.5 (63.5)	10.7 (51.3)	−2.5 (27.5)	−10.0 (14.0)	7.9 (46.2)
Daily mean °C (°F)	−16.7 (1.9)	−13.7 (7.3)	−6.2 (20.8)	4.0 (39.2)	11.3 (52.3)	15.3 (59.5)	17.2 (63.0)	16.2 (61.2)	10.6 (51.1)	4.3 (39.7)	−7.1 (19.2)	−15.0 (5.0)	1.7 (35.1)
Mean daily minimum °C (°F)	−21.9 (−7.4)	−19.0 (−2.2)	−11.5 (11.3)	−2.4 (27.7)	3.8 (38.8)	8.2 (46.8)	10.1 (50.2)	8.5 (47.3)	3.6 (38.5)	−2.2 (28.0)	−11.6 (11.1)	−19.9 (−3.8)	−4.5 (23.9)
Record low °C (°F)	−45.0 (−49.0)	−43.0 (−45.4)	−38.3 (−36.9)	−28.0 (−18.4)	−7.0 (19.4)	−1.5 (29.3)	1.5 (34.7)	−2.5 (27.5)	−9.0 (15.8)	−25.0 (−13.0)	−37.0 (−34.6)	−48.0 (−54.4)	−48.0 (−54.4)
Average precipitation mm (inches)	21.0 (0.83)	14.7 (0.58)	22.8 (0.90)	30.7 (1.21)	42.6 (1.68)	69.5 (2.74)	62.6 (2.46)	48.1 (1.89)	35.0 (1.38)	14.9 (0.59)	21.1 (0.83)	23.7 (0.93)	406.7 (16.01)
Source: Environment Canada

== See also ==
- List of communities in Saskatchewan
- List of villages in Saskatchewan
