= Battlefords Bridge =

Bridge in Saskatchewan, Canada

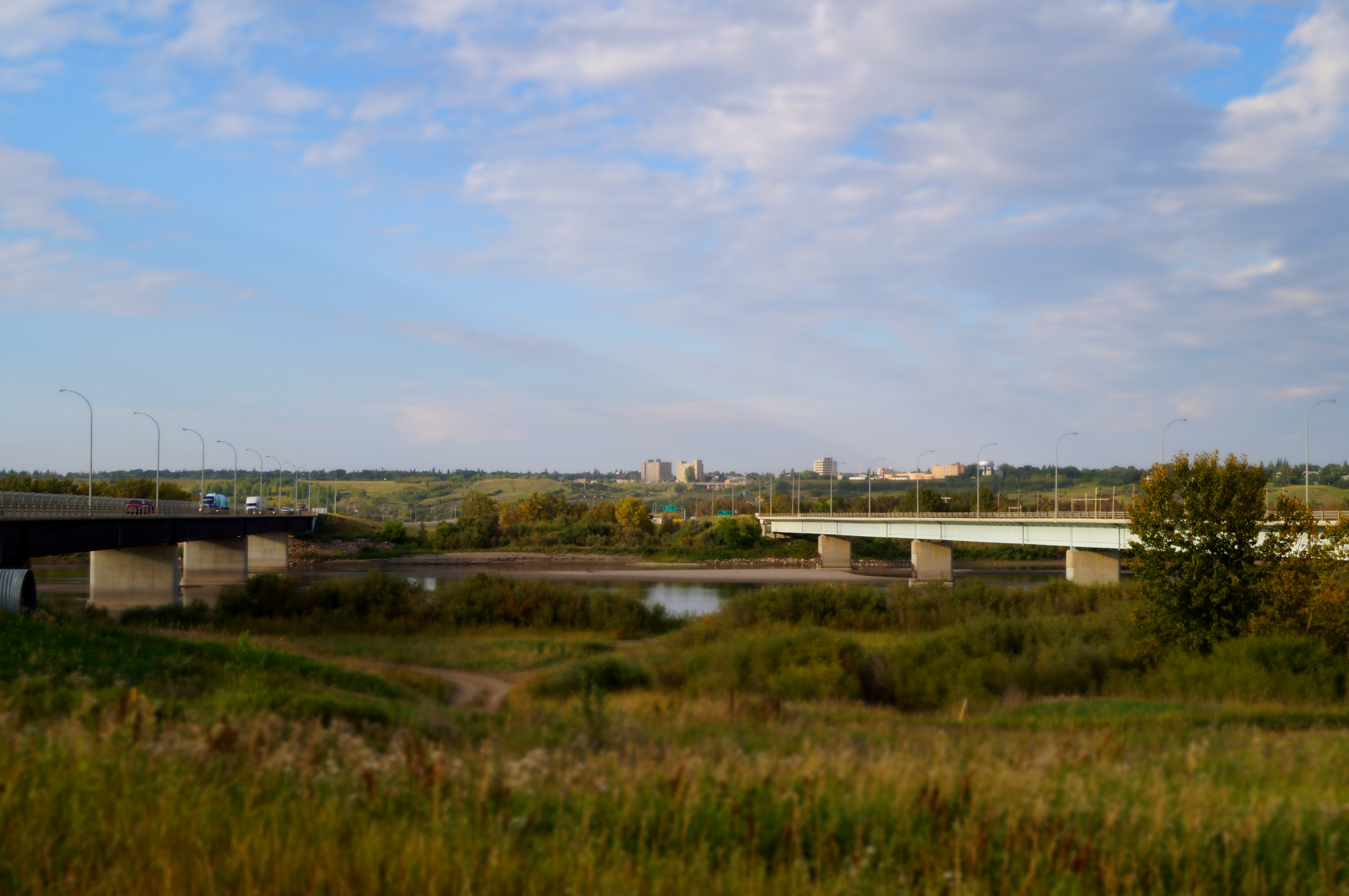
- Battlefords Bridge
- Coordinates: 52.75823°N 108.31628°W
- Carries: Four lanes of Highway 16 (TCH/YH) / Highway 4 / Highway 40
- Crosses: North Saskatchewan River
- Locale: The Battlefords
- Begins: Town of Battleford
- Ends: City of North Battleford
- Named for: The Battlefords
- Maintained by: Ministry of Highways and Infrastructure
- Next upstream: Railway bridge
- Next downstream: Battleford Bridge

Characteristics
- Design: Concrete and steel girder
- No. of lanes: 4

History
- Constructed by: PCL-Maxam, a Joint Venture (for the second span only)
- Construction end: 2002
- Construction cost: $10.2 million (for the second span only)
- Replaces: Battleford Bridge

Location
- Interactive map of Battlefords Bridge

The Battlefords Bridge is a twin-span, four lane concrete and steel girder highway bridge that carries the Trans-Canada Yellowhead Highway across the North Saskatchewan River in the Canadian province of Saskatchewan. The bridge connects the town of Battleford on the south shore and the city of North Battleford on the north shore. With the completion of the second span in 2002, the original downstream bridge across the river that connected the two communities was closed to through highway traffic.

Three highways, 16, 4, and 40, run concurrently across the bridge.

== Description ==
Originally built as a two-lane single bridge, a second bridge was built parallel to it in 2001–02. PCL-Maxam, a Joint Venture was awarded the initial construction contract for the second bridge while Supreme Steel Ltd received a separate contract to erect the structural steel girders. The cost of the second bridge, solely funded by the provincial government, was $10.4 million. The construction also included 6 kilometres (3.7 mi) of highway twinning and improvements leading up to the bridges, of which the federal government contributed $11.2 million. The twinning of the Battlefords Bridge was an important segment of the Highway 16 (Yellowhead Highway) twinning project from North Battleford west to Lloydminster and the Alberta border. The first bridge span now carries east-bound traffic while the newer one carries west-bound traffic.

The completion of the second span precipitated the decommissioning of the downstream Battleford Bridge in 2003.

== See also ==
- List of crossings of the North Saskatchewan River
- List of bridges in Canada
