= Rural Municipality of Langenburg No. 181 =

Rural municipality in Saskatchewan, Canada

Langenburg No. 181
- Rural municipality
- Rural Municipality of Langenburg No. 181
- Location of the RM of Langenburg No. 181 in Saskatchewan
- Coordinates: 50.786°N 101.756°W
- Country: Canada
- Province: Saskatchewan
- Census division: 5
- SARM division: 1
- Formed: January 1, 1913

Government
  - Reeve: Terry Hildebrandt
  - Governing body: RM of Langenburg No. 181 Council
  - Administrator: Krystal Johnston
  - Office location: Langenburg

Area (2016)
  - Land: 675.42 km^{2} (260.78 sq mi)

Population (2016)
  - Total: 557
  - Density: 0.8/km^{2} (2.1/sq mi)
- Time zone: CST
  - Summer (DST): CST
- Area codes: 306 and 639

The Rural Municipality of Langenburg No. 181 (2016 population: 557) is a rural municipality (RM) in the Canadian province of Saskatchewan within Census Division No. 5 and SARM Division No. 1. It is located in the east-central portion of the province.

== History ==
The RM of Langenburg No. 181 incorporated as a rural municipality on January 1, 1913. It was previously established as Local Improvement District No. 79 on May 1, 1897.

== Geography ==
=== Communities and localities ===
The following urban municipalities are surrounded by the RM.

Towns

- Langenburg

Villages

- Yarbo

The following unincorporated communities are within the RM.

Localities

- Marchwell

=== Parks and recreation ===
- Langenburg Recreation Site (50.8313°N 101.7078°W) is a provincial recreation site adjacent to the south side of Langenburg's soccer pitches.

== Demographics ==
Population history (1981–2016)
Year	Pop.	±%
1981	1,022	—
1986	960	−6.1%
1991	855	−10.9%
1996	768	−10.2%
2001	647	−15.8%
2006	558	−13.8%
2011	572	+2.5%
2016	557	−2.6%
Source: Statistics Canada via Saskatchewan Bureau of Statistics

In the 2021 Census of Population conducted by Statistics Canada, the RM of Langenburg No. 181 had a population of 561 living in 211 of its 233 total private dwellings, a change of 0.7% from its 2016 population of 557. With a land area of 656.42 km^{2} (253.45 sq mi), it had a population density of 0.9/km^{2} (2.2/sq mi) in 2021.

In the 2016 Census of Population, the RM of Langenburg No. 181 recorded a population of 557 living in 219 of its 246 total private dwellings, a −2.6% change from its 2011 population of 572. With a land area of 675.42 km^{2} (260.78 sq mi), it had a population density of 0.8/km^{2} (2.1/sq mi) in 2016.

== Government ==
The RM of Langenburg No. 181 is governed by an elected municipal council and an appointed administrator that meets on the second Thursday of every month. The reeve of the RM is Terry Hildebrandt while its administrator is Krystal Johnston. The RM's office is located in Langenburg.
