= Bresaylor =

Community in Saskatchewan, Canada

Coordinates: 52°58′09″N 108°45′56″W

Location of Bresaylor in Saskatchewan

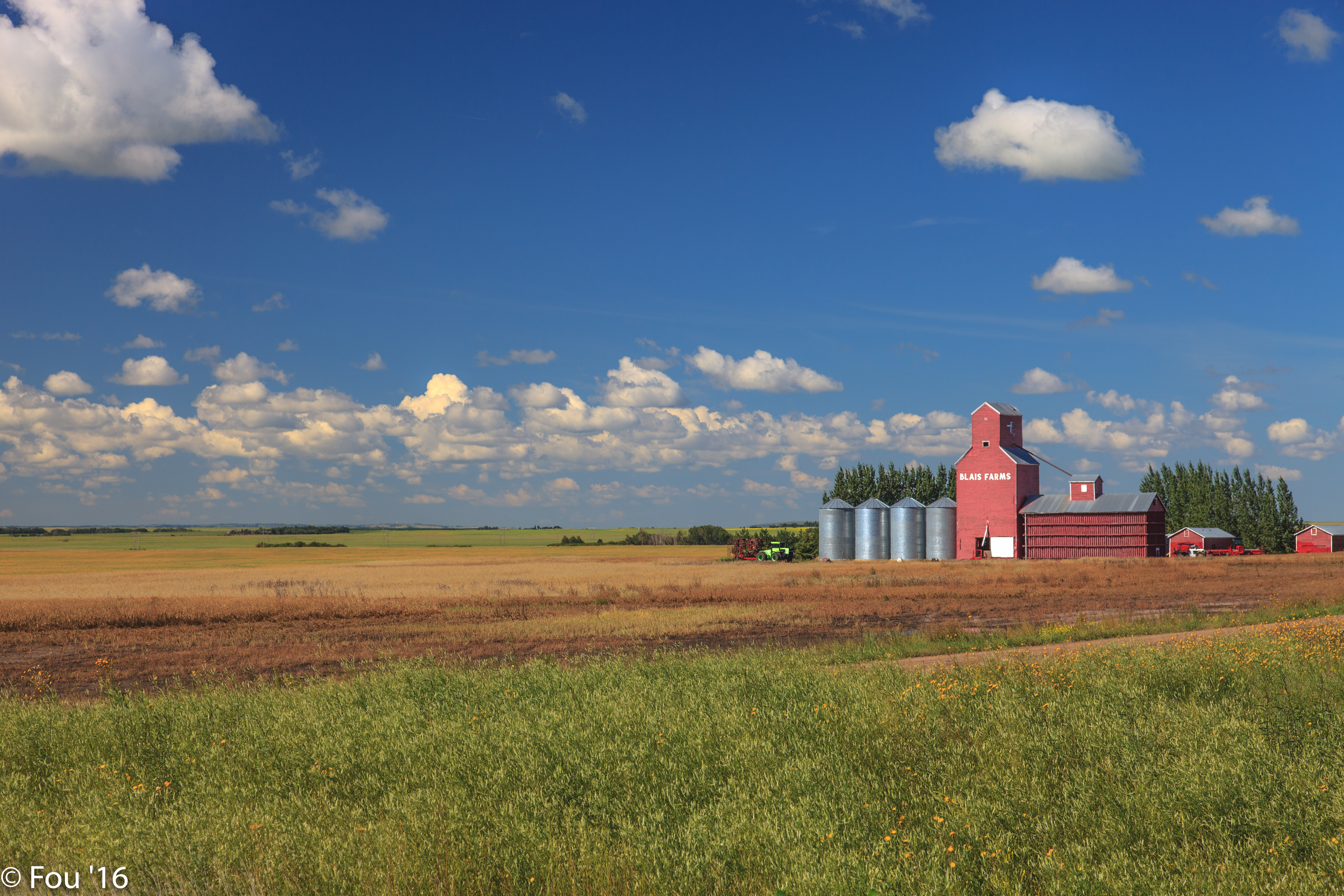
Former Federal Grain elevator that stood in Bresaylor, now located along Highway 16.

Bresaylor is an unincorporated community in the Rural Municipality of Paynton No. 470, Saskatchewan, Canada. It is the home of the Bresaylor Heritage Museum, containing artifacts from the area.

The name comes from the surnames of the three Métis founding families, including: the Bremners, Sayers, and the Taylors.

== See also ==
- List of communities in Saskatchewan
