= Marchwell =

Community in Saskatchewan, Canada

- Locality
- Location within Saskatchewan Location within Canada
- Coordinates: 50°48′0″N 101°35′2″W
- Country: Canada
- Province: Saskatchewan
- Region: Saskatchewan
- Census division: 5
- Rural municipality: Langenburg No. 181

Government
  - Governing body: Langenburg Rural Municipality
- Time zone: CST
- Area code: 306
- Highways: Highway 16

Marchwell is an unincorporated community in Rural Municipality of Langenburg No. 181, Saskatchewan, Canada. The locality is located along the Yellowhead Highway (Highway 16), about six kilometres (3.7 miles) west of the Manitoba border, 237 km (147 mi) northeast of Regina, and 415 km (258 mi) southeast of Saskatoon.

The community is named for March brothers (Frank M. and Charles H. March) and Henry Wells of Litchfield, Minnesota. When the rail siding was created in 1909, it was named Marchwells, but the post office dropped the "s".

== See also ==
- List of communities in Saskatchewan
