= Brada, Saskatchewan =

Community in Saskatchewan, Canada

Coordinates: 52°43′23″N 108°11′40″W

Location of Brada in Saskatchewan

Brada is an unincorporated community in Saskatchewan, Canada, located just outside the eastern city limits of North Battleford on Yellowhead Highway 16. It consists of a few homes and industrial businesses.

== See also ==
- List of communities in Saskatchewan
