= Rural Municipality of Paynton No. 470 =

Rural municipality in Saskatchewan, Canada

Paynton No. 470
- Rural municipality
- Rural Municipality of Paynton No. 470
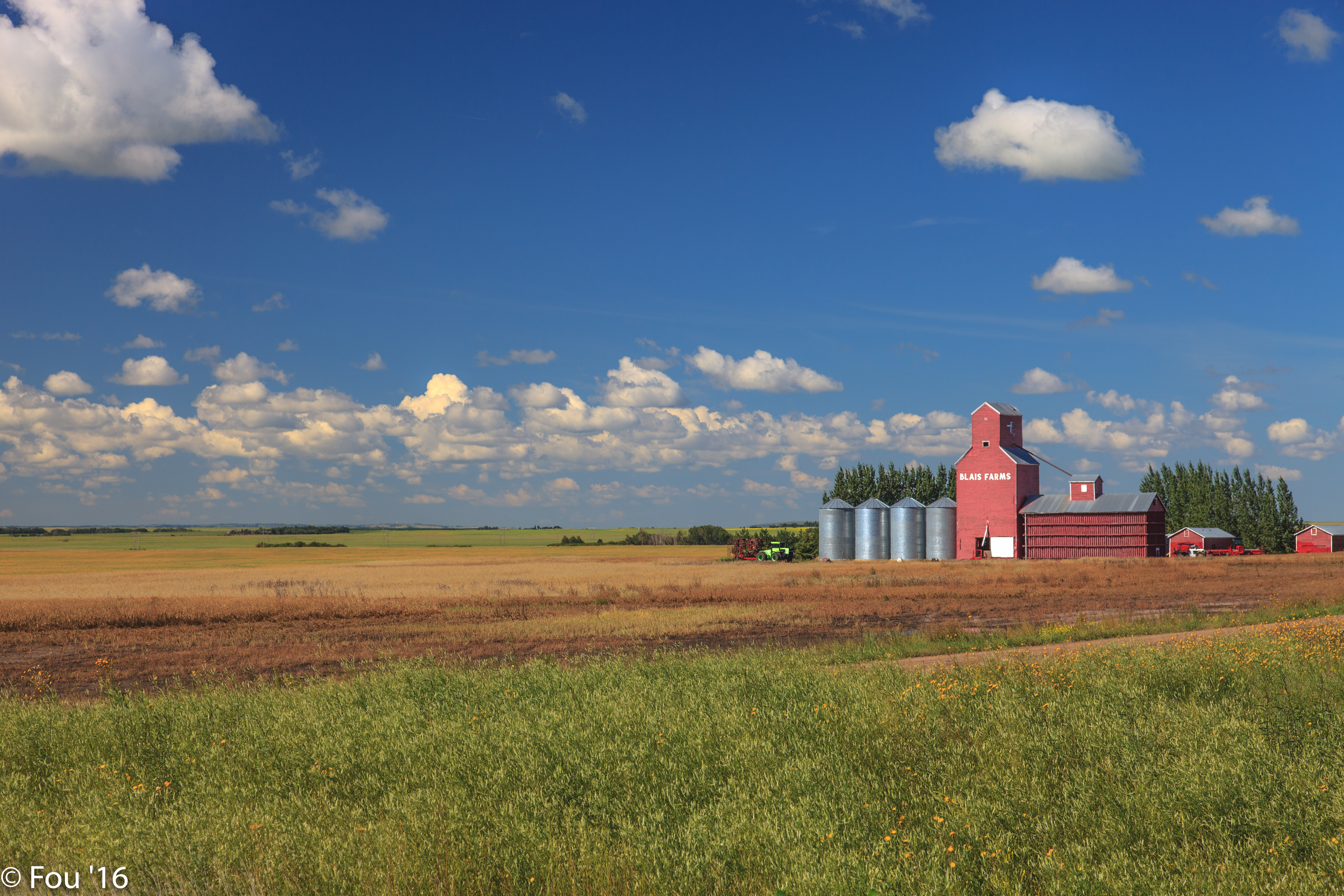
- Bresaylor elevator along Highway 16

- Location of the RM of Paynton No. 470 in Saskatchewan
- Coordinates: 53.018°N 108.951°W
- Country: Canada
- Province: Saskatchewan
- Census division: 17
- SARM division: 6
- Formed: January 1, 1913

Government
  - Reeve: Kevin Garrett
  - Governing body: RM of Paynton No. 470 Council
  - Administrator: Michelle Buechler
  - Office location: Paynton

Area (2016)
  - Land: 593.95 km^{2} (229.33 sq mi)

Population (2016)
  - Total: 255
  - Density: 0.4/km^{2} (1.0/sq mi)
- Time zone: UTC−07:00 (MST)
  - Summer (DST): UTC−06:00 (MDT)
- Area codes: 306 and 639

The Rural Municipality of Paynton No. 470 (2016 population: 255) is a rural municipality (RM) in the Canadian province of Saskatchewan within Census Division No. 17 and SARM Division No. 6. It is in the northwest-central portion of the province.

== History ==
The RM of Paynton No. 470 incorporated as a rural municipality on January 1, 1913.

== Geography ==
=== Communities and localities ===
The following urban municipalities are surrounded by the RM.

Villages

- Paynton

The following unincorporated communities are within the RM.

Localities

- Bresaylor

== Demographics ==
Population history (1981–2016)
Year	Pop.	±%
1981	389	—
1986	376	−3.3%
1991	354	−5.9%
1996	301	−15.0%
2001	259	−14.0%
2006	254	−1.9%
2011	268	+5.5%
2016	255	−4.9%
Source: Statistics Canada via Saskatchewan Bureau of Statistics

In the 2021 Census of Population conducted by Statistics Canada, the RM of Paynton No. 470 had a population of 238 living in 104 of its 127 total private dwellings, a change of −6.7% from its 2016 population of 255. With a land area of 588.62 km^{2} (227.27 sq mi), it had a population density of 0.4/km^{2} (1.0/sq mi) in 2021.

In the 2016 Census of Population, the RM of Paynton No. 470 recorded a population of 255 living in 106 of its 135 total private dwellings, a −4.9% change from its 2011 population of 268. With a land area of 593.95 km^{2} (229.33 sq mi), it had a population density of 0.4/km^{2} (1.1/sq mi) in 2016.

== Government ==
The RM of Paynton No. 470 is governed by an elected municipal council and an appointed administrator that meets on the second Wednesday of every month. The reeve of the RM is Kevin Garrett while its administrator is Michelle Buechler. The RM's office is located in Paynton.
