= Insinger, Saskatchewan =

Community in Saskatchewan, Canada

Insinger
- Unincorporated area
- Location of Insinger in Saskatchewan Insinger (Canada)
- Coordinates: 51°32′0″N 103°5′0″W
- Country: Canada
- Province: Saskatchewan
- Rural Municipalities (RM): Insinger No. 275
- Post office Founded as Lawrie: 1898-09-01
- Post office change of name to Insinger: 1907-09-01

Government
  - Mayor: Part of the RM municipal affairs
  - Summer (DST): CST

Insinger is an unincorporated area in the Rural Municipality of Insinger No. 275, in the Canadian province of Saskatchewan. Insinger is located on Highway 16 in south-eastern Saskatchewan. Lawrie post office first opened in 1898 at the legal land description of Sec.6, Twp.29, R.7, W2. It changed names in 1907 to Insinger and moved to Sec.21, Twp.29, R.8, W2 .

The population is smaller than a hamlet, and is counted within the RM of Insinger No. 275, however it is still listed as a village at Geonames. Insinger is located between Yorkton and Foam Lake. It is also within 14 kilometres (8.7 mi) of Whitesand Regional Park.

== See also ==
- List of communities in Saskatchewan
