= Rural Municipality of Battle River No. 438 =

Rural municipality in Saskatchewan, Canada

Battle River No. 438
- Rural municipality
- Rural Municipality of Battle River No. 438
- Location of the RM of Battle River No. 438 in Saskatchewan
- Coordinates: 52.701°N 108.333°W
- Country: Canada
- Province: Saskatchewan
- Census division: 12
- SARM division: 6
- Formed: December 12, 1910

Government
  - Reeve: Stewart Mitchell
  - Governing body: RM of Battle River No. 438 Council
  - Administrator: Betty Johnson
  - Office location: Battleford

Area (2016)
  - Land: 1,061.4 km^{2} (409.8 sq mi)

Population (2016)
  - Total: 1,154
  - Density: 1.1/km^{2} (2.8/sq mi)
- Time zone: CST
  - Summer (DST): CST
- Area codes: 306 and 639

The Rural Municipality of Battle River No. 438 (2016 population: 1,154) is a rural municipality (RM) in the Canadian province of Saskatchewan within Census Division No. 12 and SARM Division No. 6.

== History ==
The RM of Battle River No. 438 incorporated as a rural municipality on December 12, 1910.

== Geography ==
=== Communities and localities ===
The following urban municipalities are surrounded by the RM.

Towns

- Battleford

The following unincorporated communities are located within the RM.

Organized hamlets

- Delmas

Localities

- Highgate

The following Indian reserves are surrounded by the RM.

First Nations Indian reserves

- Sweet Grass 113
- Sweet Grass 113-M16

== Demographics ==
Population history (1981–2016)
Year	Pop.	±%
1981	829	—
1986	946	+14.1%
1991	866	−8.5%
1996	854	−1.4%
2001	1,065	+24.7%
2006	1,053	−1.1%
2011	1,099	+4.4%
2016	1,154	+5.0%
Source: Statistics Canada via Saskatchewan Bureau of Statistics

In the 2021 Census of Population conducted by Statistics Canada, the RM of Battle River No. 438 had a population of 1,029 living in 409 of its 449 total private dwellings, a change of −4.2% from its 2016 population of 1,074. With a land area of 1,056.77 km^{2} (408.02 sq mi), it had a population density of 1.0/km^{2} (2.5/sq mi) in 2021.

In the 2016 Census of Population, the RM of Battle River No. 438 recorded a population of 1,154 living in 434 of its 464 total private dwellings, a 5% change from its 2011 population of 1,099. With a land area of 1,061.4 km^{2} (409.8 sq mi), it had a population density of 1.1/km^{2} (2.8/sq mi) in 2016.

== Parks and recreation ==
- Table Mountain Ski Resort

== Government ==
The RM of Battle River No. 438 is governed by an elected municipal council and an appointed administrator that meets on the first Thursday of every month. The reeve of the RM is Stewart Mitchell while its administrator is Betty Johnson. The RM's office is located in Battleford.

== See also ==
- List of rural municipalities in Saskatchewan
