= Rural Municipality of Great Bend No. 405 =

Rural municipality in Saskatchewan, Canada

Great Bend No. 405
- Rural municipality
- Rural Municipality of Great Bend No. 405
- Location of the RM of Great Bend No. 405 in Saskatchewan
- Coordinates: 52.445°N 107.162°W
- Country: Canada
- Province: Saskatchewan
- Census division: 16
- SARM division: 6
- Formed: December 12, 1910

Government
  - Reeve: Gary Nickel
  - Governing body: RM of Great Bend No. 405 Council
  - Administrator: Diane Tracksell
  - Office location: Borden

Area (2016)
  - Land: 830.58 km^{2} (320.69 sq mi)

Population (2016)
  - Total: 509
  - Density: 0.6/km^{2} (1.6/sq mi)
- Time zone: CST
  - Summer (DST): CST
- Area codes: 306 and 639

The Rural Municipality of Great Bend No. 405 (2016 population: 509) is a rural municipality (RM) in the Canadian province of Saskatchewan within Census Division No. 16 and SARM Division No. 6. Located in the west-central portion of the province, it is approximately 50 km (31 mi) to the northwest of Saskatoon.

== History ==
The RM of Great Bend No. 405 incorporated as a rural municipality on December 12, 1910. It was originally formed as Local Improvement District (LID) No. 405 on June 4, 1910 through the amalgamation of LIDs 20-E-3 (originally established June 5, 1905), 20-D-3 (originally established August 13, 1906), and 21-D-3 (originally established November 14, 1906).

== Geography ==
=== Communities and localities ===
The following urban municipalities are surrounded by the RM.

Towns

- Radisson

Villages

- Borden

The following unincorporated communities are within the RM.

Localities

- Great Deer

== Demographics ==
Population history (1981–2016)
Year	Pop.	±%
1981	623	—
1986	616	−1.1%
1991	546	−11.4%
1996	542	−0.7%
2001	529	−2.4%
2006	458	−13.4%
2011	499	+9.0%
2016	509	+2.0%
Source: Statistics Canada via Saskatchewan Bureau of Statistics

In the 2021 Census of Population conducted by Statistics Canada, the RM of Great Bend No. 405 had a population of 381 living in 147 of its 181 total private dwellings, a change of −25.1% from its 2016 population of 509. With a land area of 825.9 km^{2} (318.9 sq mi), it had a population density of 0.5/km^{2} (1.2/sq mi) in 2021.

In the 2016 Census of Population, the RM of Great Bend No. 405 recorded a population of 509 living in 203 of its 232 total private dwellings, a 2% change from its 2011 population of 499. With a land area of 830.58 km^{2} (320.69 sq mi), it had a population density of 0.6/km^{2} (1.6/sq mi) in 2016.

== Economy ==
The majority of economic activity in the area is related to agriculture, predominantly grain farming and cattle ranching.

== Government ==
The RM of Great Bend No. 405 is governed by an elected municipal council and an appointed administrator that meets on the second Wednesday of every month. The reeve of the RM is Gary Nickel while its administrator is Diane Tracksell. The RM's office is located in Borden.

== Notable people ==
- John Diefenbaker, the 13th Prime Minister of Canada, lived here as a child from 1906 until 1910, when the family moved to Saskatoon.
