= Rural Municipality of Insinger No. 275 =

Rural municipality in Saskatchewan, Canada

Insinger No. 275
- Rural municipality
- Rural Municipality of Insinger No. 275
- Location of the RM of Insinger No. 275 in Saskatchewan
- Coordinates: 51.535°N 103.067°W
- Country: Canada
- Province: Saskatchewan
- Census division: 9
- SARM division: 4
- Formed: January 1, 1913

Government
  - Reeve: Willy Zuchkan
  - Governing body: RM of Insinger No. 275 Council
  - Administrator: Sonya Butuk
  - Office location: Insinger

Area (2016)
  - Land: 849.38 km^{2} (327.95 sq mi)

Population (2016)
  - Total: 315
  - Density: 0.4/km^{2} (1.0/sq mi)
- Time zone: CST
  - Summer (DST): CST
- Area codes: 306 and 639

The Rural Municipality of Insinger No. 275 (2016 population: 315) is a rural municipality (RM) in the Canadian province of Saskatchewan within Census Division No. 9 and SARM Division No. 4. It is located in the east-central portion of the province.

== History ==
The RM of Insinger No. 275 incorporated as a rural municipality on January 1, 1913.

== Geography ==
=== Communities and localities ===
The following urban municipalities are surrounded by the RM.

Villages

- Sheho
- Theodore

The following unincorporated communities are within the RM.

Localities

- Goldenvale
- Insinger
- Stonyview

== Demographics ==
Population history (1981–2016)
Year	Pop.	±%
1981	805	—
1986	732	−9.1%
1991	634	−13.4%
1996	567	−10.6%
2001	458	−19.2%
2006	373	−18.6%
2011	325	−12.9%
2016	315	−3.1%
Source: Statistics Canada via Saskatchewan Bureau of Statistics

In the 2021 Census of Population conducted by Statistics Canada, the RM of Insinger No. 275 had a population of 305 living in 133 of its 158 total private dwellings, a change of −3.2% from its 2016 population of 315. With a land area of 808.55 km^{2} (312.18 sq mi), it had a population density of 0.4/km^{2} (1.0/sq mi) in 2021.

In the 2016 Census of Population, the RM of Insinger No. 275 recorded a population of 315 living in 147 of its 196 total private dwellings, a −3.1% change from its 2011 population of 325. With a land area of 849.38 km^{2} (327.95 sq mi), it had a population density of 0.4/km^{2} (1.0/sq mi) in 2016.

== Government ==
The RM of Insinger No. 275 is governed by an elected municipal council and an appointed administrator that meets on the second Wednesday of every month. The reeve of the RM is Willy Zuchkan while its administrator is Sonya Butuk. The RM's office is located in Insinger.
