= Saskatchewan Highway 378 =

Provincial highway in Saskatchewan, Canada

Highway 378

Route information
- Maintained by Ministry of Highways and Infrastructure
- Length: 108.2 km (67.2 mi)

Major junctions
- West end: Highway 4 near North Battleford
- Highway 324 near Redfield
- North end: Highway 3 in Spiritwood

Location
- Country: Canada
- Province: Saskatchewan
- Rural municipalities: North Battleford, Douglas, Round Hill, Meeting Lake, Spiritwood

Highway system
- Provincial highways in Saskatchewan
← Highway 377	→ Highway 379

Highway 378 is a provincial highway in the Canadian province of Saskatchewan. It runs from Highway 4 near North Battleford to Highway 3 in Spiritwood, just east of its intersection with Highway 24, providing access to Whitkow, Rabbit Lake, Meeting Lake, and Meeting Lake Regional Park. It is about 108 kilometres (67 mi) long.

While the highway travels in a northeast–southwest direction, portions of Hwy 378 are signed as north–south and east–west. Hwy 378 is quite notable for its scenic winding section through the Thickwood Hills.

== Route description ==
Hwy 378 begins in the Rural Municipality of North Battleford No. 437 at a junction with Hwy 4, roughly halfway between the city of North Battleford and the hamlet of Hamlin. It heads due east through rural farmland for several kilometres to an intersection with the north end of Hwy 687, where Hwy 378 turns left, winding its way northeast through the hilly terrain of the Thickwood Hills for the next few kilometres, passing by both the Diamond Hills Resort and Adventure Park and several small lakes as it crosses into the Rural Municipality of Douglas No. 436.

After travelling through the very northwest corner of the RM, where it makes a sharp turn to the north and curves around Acton Lake, the crosses Page Creek into the Rural Municipality of Round Hill No. 467, immediately travelling through the hamlet of Whitkow and having a junction with the east end of Hwy 750, with Hwy 378 making a right here. Travelling past Glass Lake, the highway arrives at a junction with the west end of Hwy 324, with Hwy 378 making a left and winding its way northeast through hills for several more kilometres to the village of Rabbit Lake, where it crosses a former railway line and has an intersection with both Hwy 794 and Hwy 769.

Curving due eastward into the Rural Municipality of Meeting Lake No. 466, the highway travels along the southern coastline of Meeting Lake, having intersections with access roads to Meeting Lake Regional Park and Spruce Bay (Range Road 3124), Shady Bay (Range Road 3123), Mullingar (Range Road 3122), and Crescent Beach (Meeting Lake Drive) before having a junction with the north end of Hwy 686 (leads south to Mayfair).

Hwy 378 traverses a couple switchbacks to enter the Rural Municipality of Spiritwood No. 496, pulling away from the lake and passing due north through rural farmland for several kilometres to enter the town of Spiritwood along Fourth Street E, travelling through a mix of neighbourhoods and a business district on the east side of town before coming to an end at an intersection with Hwy 3, just a few blocks east of that highway's intersection with Hwy 24. The entire length of Hwy 378 is a paved, two-lane highway.

== Major intersections ==
From south to north:

Rural municipality	Location	km	mi	Destinations	Notes
North Battleford No. 437		0.0	0.0	Highway 4 – The Battlefords, Meadow Lake	Western terminus; Hwy 378 travels east
North Battleford No. 437		19.5	12.1	Highway 687 south – Denholm	Northern terminus of Hwy 687; Hwy 378 branches north
Douglas No. 436	No major junctions				
Round Hill No. 467		40.9	25.4	Highway 750 west	Eastern terminus of Hwy 750
Round Hill No. 467		44.2	27.5	Highway 324 east – Redfield, Mayfair	Western terminus of Hwy 324
Round Hill No. 467	Rabbit Lake	66.8	41.5	Railway Avenue – Rabbit Lake	
Round Hill No. 467		67.9– 69.0	42.2– 42.9	Highway 769 west / Highway 794 north – Glenbush	Eastern terminus of Hwy 769; northern terminus of Hwy 794
Meeting Lake No. 466		73.2	45.5	Range Road 3124 – Meeting Lake Regional Park, Spruce Bay	
Meeting Lake No. 466		74.9	46.5	Range Road 3123 – Shady Bay	
Meeting Lake No. 466		76.6	47.6	Range Road 3122 – Mullingar	
Meeting Lake No. 466		78.0	48.5	Meeting Lake Drive – Crescent Beach	
Meeting Lake No. 466		83.7	52.0	Highway 686 south – Mayfair	Northern terminus of Hwy 686
Spiritwood No. 496	Spiritwood	108.2	67.2	Highway 3 to Highway 24 – Glaslyn, Prince Albert	Northern terminus
1.000 mi = 1.609 km; 1.000 km = 0.621 mi

== See also ==
- Transportation in Saskatchewan
- Roads in Saskatchewan
