= Saskatchewan Highway 376 =

Provincial highway in Saskatchewan, Canada

Highway 376

Route information
- Maintained by Ministry of Highways and Infrastructure
- Length: 120.5 km (74.9 mi)

Major junctions
- South end: Highway 14 near Asquith
- Highway 16 (TCH/YH) in Maymont; Highway 40 near Richard
- North end: Highway 324 near Redfield

Location
- Country: Canada
- Province: Saskatchewan
- Rural municipalities: Vanscoy, Perdue, Corman Park, Eagle Creek, Mayfield, Douglas, Meeting Lake

Highway system
- Provincial highways in Saskatchewan
← Highway 375	→ Highway 377

Highway 376 is a provincial highway in the Canadian province of Saskatchewan. It runs from Highway 14 near Asquith to Highway 324. It is about 121 kilometres (75 mi) long. The highway passes through the communities of Maymont, Sonningdale, and Richard. It also provides access to Eagle Creek Regional Park and Glenburn Regional Park.

Highway 376 is paved between Highways 14 and 40 and gravel north of Highway 40. It crosses the North Saskatchewan River south of Maymont via the Maymont Bridge. In 2024–25, the old timber bridge that crossed Eagle Creek west of Asquith was replaced with a concrete one at a cost of $2.5 million.

== Route description ==
Hwy 376 begins on the boundary between the Rural Municipalities of Perdue No. 346 and Vanscoy No. 345 at an intersection with Hwy 14 just west of the town of Asquith, with the road continuing south as Range Road 3100. It heads north along the boundary as a paved two-lane highway for a few kilometres before running on the boundary between the Rural Municipalities of Eagle Creek No. 376 and Corman Park No. 344. The highway curves due westward, fully entering the R.M. Of Eagle Creek No. 376, at the locality of Environ, traveling through rural areas as it crosses a bridge over Eagle Creek and travels just to the north of Eagle Creek Regional Park, which is accessed via Range Road 3105. Hwy 376 makes a sudden sharp right at an intersection with the north end of Hwy 655 to enter the hamlet of Arelee, where it travels along the western side of town and makes an abrupt sharp left turn. Leaving Arelee, the highway makes a series of zigzag turns as it travels northwest, passing through the hamlets of Struan, where it shares a short concurrency (overlap) with Hwy 784, and Sonningdale before having an intersection with Baljennie Road (Township Road 404; provides access to the hamlet of Baljennie) and crossing the Maymont Bridge over the North Saskatchewan River. Entering the Rural Municipality of Mayfield No. 406, the highway travels past Glenburn Regional Park on its way to pass through the centre of the village of Maymont along Main Street, where it crosses both Canadian National Railway's Aberdeen subdivision and the Yellowhead Highway (Hwy 16). Leaving Maymont, the road continues north through rural areas, entering the Rural Municipality of Douglas No. 436 and passing through the village of Richard before coming to an intersection with Hwy 40, where the pavement transitions to gravel. Hwy 376 continues north through rural farmland for several kilometres, entering the Rural Municipality of Meeting Lake No. 466 shortly before coming to an end at a junction with Hwy 324 just east of the hamlet of Redfield, with the highway continuing north as eastbound Hwy 324.

== Major intersections ==
From south to north:

Rural municipality	Location	km	mi	Destinations	Notes
Perdue No. 346 – Vanscoy No. 345 boundary		0.0	0.0	Highway 14 – Biggar, Asquith, Saskatoon	Southern terminus; road continues south as Range Road 3100
Eagle Creek No. 376 - Corman Park No. 344 boundary	No major junctions				
Eagle Creek No. 376		17.7	11.0	Bridge over Eagle Creek	
Eagle Creek No. 376		19.7	12.2	Range Road 3105 – Eagle Creek Regional Park	
Eagle Creek No. 376		26.2	16.3	Highway 655 south – Perdue	Northern terminus of Hwy 655
Eagle Creek No. 376	Arelee	29.3	18.2	Range Road 3113	
Eagle Creek No. 376	Struan	42.2	26.2	Highway 784 east – Warman	Hwy 374 branches west; south end of Hwy 784 concurrency
Eagle Creek No. 376		44.7	27.8	Highway 784 west – Cando	Hwy 374 branches north; north end of Hwy 784 concurrency
Eagle Creek No. 376	Sonningdale	54.9	34.1	Range Road 3124	
Eagle Creek No. 376		65.0	40.4	Baljennie Road (Township Road 404) – Baljennie	
Eagle Creek No. 376 – Mayfield No. 406 boundary		68.3	42.4	Maymont Bridge over the North Saskatchewan River	
Mayfield No. 406		69.0	42.9	Glenburn Regional Park access road	
Mayfield No. 406	Maymont	76.6	47.6	Highway 16 (TCH/YH) – The Battlefords, Saskatoon	
Douglas No. 436	Richard	91.2	56.7	Township Road 432	
Douglas No. 436		94.5	58.7	Highway 40 – The Battlefords, Prince Albert	Southern end of unpaved section
Meeting Lake No. 466		120.5	74.9	Highway 324 – Spiritwood, The Battlefords, Mayfair	Northern terminus; northern end of unpaved section; road continues north as Hwy 324 eastbound
1.000 mi = 1.609 km; 1.000 km = 0.621 mi: Concurrency terminus

== See also ==
- Transportation in Saskatchewan
- Roads in Saskatchewan
