= Saskatchewan Highway 324 =

Provincial highway in Saskatchewan, Canada

Highway 324

Route information
- Maintained by Ministry of Highways and Infrastructure
- Length: 18.5 km (11.5 mi)

Major junctions
- West end: Highway 378 near Redfield
- Highway 376 near Redfield
- East end: Railway Avenue / Range Road 3120 in Mayfair

Location
- Country: Canada
- Province: Saskatchewan
- Rural municipalities: Round Hill, Meeting Lake

Highway system
- Provincial highways in Saskatchewan
| ← Highway 322 | → Highway 332 |

Highway 324 is a provincial highway in the Canadian province of Saskatchewan. It runs from Highway 378 to the intersection of Railway Avenue and Range Road 3120 in Mayfair. The highway passes near Redfield and connects with Highways 376 and 686. It is about 18 kilometres (11 mi) long.

== Route description ==
Hwy 324 begins in the Rural Municipality of Round Hill No. 467 at a junction with Hwy 378 northeast of Whitkow, winding its way eastward through rural prairie lands to enter the Rural Municipality of Meeting Lake No. 466 at an intersection with an access road to Redfield (which the highway bypasses just to the north of). The highway crosses a small creek before making a sharp left at an intersection with Hwy 376, heading north to cross the same small creek again and make sharp right onto Township Road 464 at an intersection with Range Road 3124 (provides access to Mullingar). Hwy 324 heads east again through rural farmland for a few kilometres before making a sudden sharp right onto Range Road 3120 at the junction with Hwy 686 as it enters Mayfair, crossing a former railway twice before coming to an end at the intersection with Railway Avenue at the northern end of town. The entire length of Hwy 324 is a gravel, two-lane road.

== Major intersections ==
| Rural municipality | Location | km | mi | Destinations | Notes |
|---|---|---|---|---|---|
| Round Hill No. 467 | | 0.0 | 0.0 | Highway 378 – The Battlefords, Spiritwood, Rabbit Lake | Western terminus; road continues west as southbound Hwy 378 |
| Round Hill No. 467 / Meeting Lake No. 466 boundary | | 5.1 | 3.2 | Redfield access road | |
| Meeting Lake No. 466 | | 8.3 | 5.2 | Highway 376 south – Richard | Northern terminus of Hwy 376 |
| Meeting Lake No. 466 | | 11.6 | 7.2 | Range Road 3124 – Mullingar, Meeting Lake Regional Park | |
| Meeting Lake No. 466 | Mayfair | 18.1 | 11.2 | Highway 686 north – Spiritwood; Township Road 464 – Ravenhead, Lorenzo, Sand Beach, Lucky Man Reserve, Lake Pitihkwakew 102B | Southern terminus of Hwy 686 |
| Meeting Lake No. 466 | Mayfair | 18.5 | 11.5 | Railway Avenue / Range Road 3120 | Eastern terminus; road continues south as Range Road 3120 |
1.000 mi = 1.609 km; 1.000 km = 0.621 mi

== See also ==
- Transportation in Saskatchewan
- Roads in Saskatchewan
