= Alticane =

Community in Saskatchewan, Canada

- Unincorporated community
- Location in Saskatchewan Alticane (Canada)
- Coordinates: 52.9001°N 107.4840°W
- Country: Canada
- Province: Saskatchewan
- Established: 1928
- Elevation: 710 m (2,330 ft)

Alticane is an unincorporated community in the Rural Municipality of Douglas No. 436, Saskatchewan, Canada.

Alticane was established in 1928 on the new Canadian National Railway branch line that ran between Speers and Mayfair. In that year, the area post office, run by Mr. McKye, was moved from its previous location 2 miles (3.2 km) south-west to the new location near the branch line, bringing the post office's name to the new town. Alticane was named after Mr. McKye's home town in Scotland.

The town contained a Saskatchewan Pool grain elevator which has since been dismantled. The abandoned CNR branch line was also removed around 2015. Alticane is now considered a ghost town with approximately one dozen abandoned houses remaining. A cairn can be seen at the entrance to the town that commemorates the 70th (1998) reunion of the residents.

== See also ==
- List of communities in Saskatchewan
- Crooked Trees
