= Baljennie =

Community in Saskatchewan, Canada

- Unincorporated community
- Location within Saskatchewan Location within Canada
- Coordinates: 52.321°N 107.535°W
- Country: Canada
- Province: Saskatchewan
- Region: West-central
- Census division: 12
- Rural Municipality: Glenside

Government
  - Reeve: Wade Parkinson
  - Administrator: Cheryl Forbes
  - Governing body: Glenside No. 377
- Time zone: CST
- Area code: 306

Baljennie is an unincorporated community in Glenside Rural Municipality No. 377, Saskatchewan, Canada. Its first post office opened in 1891.

== History ==
Baljennie was named by an early resident, Stephen ('Sandy') Warden, after his daughter Jean, and was originally spelt Baljeanie. Warden, a former officer of the North-West Mounted Police, had established a ranch in the area in the early 1880s, which subsequently became a staging post for mail coaches travelling between Saskatoon and Battleford. A school was opened at Baljennie in August 1912.

The Canadian Pacific Railway extended its line northward from Asquith to Baljennie in 1931. The line between Sonningdale and Baljennie was closed in June 1977.

Baljennie had a population of 76 at the time of the 1951 census, but declined in later years. The school was closed in 1970 and was turned into a community centre. The community's last business closed in 1991, and its derelict Anglican church was destroyed by fire three years later. After several years during which Baljennie was effectively a ghost town, a number of families moved to the town site from 2007 onwards.

== Notable people ==
- Arthur James Bater, politician

== Cultural references ==
In her 1976 song "Coyote", Canadian singer-songwriter Joni Mitchell, who grew up in Saskatoon, sings "I looked the coyote right in the face/On the road to Baljennie near my old hometown".

== See also ==
- List of communities in Saskatchewan
