= Rural Municipality of Glenside No. 377 =

Rural municipality in Saskatchewan, Canada

Glenside No. 377
- Rural municipality
- Rural Municipality of Glenside No. 377
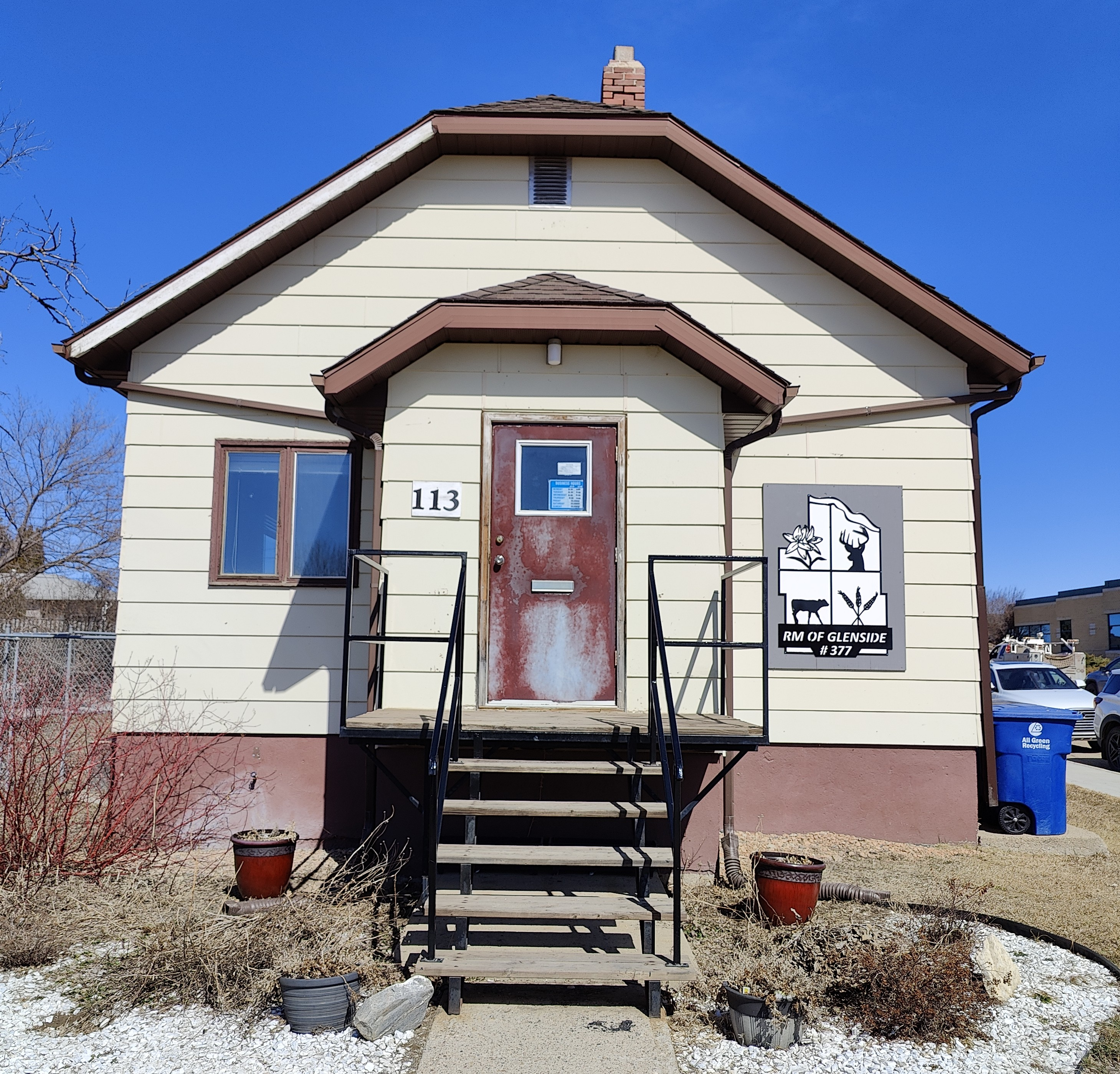
- Municipal office

- Location of the RM of Glenside No. 377 in Saskatchewan
- Coordinates: 52.465°N 107.977°W
- Country: Canada
- Province: Saskatchewan
- Census division: 12
- SARM division: 6
- Formed: December 13, 1909

Government
  - Reeve: Elmer Dove
  - Governing body: RM of Glenside No. 377 Council
  - Administrator: Joanne Fullerton
  - Office location: Biggar

Area (2016)
  - Land: 905.74 km^{2} (349.71 sq mi)

Population (2016)
  - Total: 248
  - Density: 0.3/km^{2} (0.78/sq mi)
- Time zone: CST
  - Summer (DST): CST
- Area codes: 306 and 639

The Rural Municipality of Glenside No. 377 (2016 population: 248) is a rural municipality (RM) in the Canadian province of Saskatchewan within Census Division No. 12 and SARM Division No. 6.

== History ==
The RM of Glenside No. 377 incorporated as a rural municipality on December 13, 1909.

== Geography ==
=== Communities and localities ===
The following unincorporated communities are within the RM.

Localities

- Baljennie
- Spinney Hill

== Demographics ==
Population history (1981–2016)
| Year | Pop. | ±% |
|---|---|---|
| 1981 | 493 | — |
| 1986 | 457 | −7.3% |
| 1991 | 425 | −7.0% |
| 1996 | 394 | −7.3% |
| 2001 | 354 | −10.2% |
| 2006 | 367 | +3.7% |
| 2011 | 267 | −27.2% |
| 2016 | 248 | −7.1% |
Source: Statistics Canada via Saskatchewan Bureau of Statistics

In the 2021 Census of Population conducted by Statistics Canada, the RM of Glenside No. 377 had a population of 206 living in 89 of its 102 total private dwellings, a change of −16.9% from its 2016 population of 248. With a land area of 883.96 km^{2} (341.30 sq mi), it had a population density of 0.2/km^{2} (0.6/sq mi) in 2021.

In the 2016 Census of Population, the RM of Glenside No. 377 recorded a population of 248 living in 102 of its 119 total private dwellings, a −7.1% change from its 2011 population of 267. With a land area of 905.74 km^{2} (349.71 sq mi), it had a population density of 0.3/km^{2} (0.7/sq mi) in 2016.

== Attractions ==
- Glenburn Regional Park

== Government ==
The RM of Glenside No. 377 is governed by an elected municipal council and an appointed administrator that meets on the second Wednesday of every month. The reeve of the RM is Elmer Dove while its administrator is Joanne Fullerton. The RM's office is located in Biggar.

== Transportation ==
- Saskatchewan Highway 4
- Saskatchewan Highway 784

== See also ==
- List of rural municipalities in Saskatchewan
