= Wes Funk =

Canadian writer (1969–2015)

- Born: February 18, 1969; Mayfair, Saskatchewan
- Died: October 9, 2015 (aged 46); Edmonton, Alberta
- Occupations: writer, broadcaster
- Spouse: Darwin Wagner
- Writing career
- Genres: fiction, memoirs
- Notable works: Dead Rock Stars, Cherry Blossoms
- Website: www.wesfunk.ca

Wes Funk (February 18, 1969 – October 9, 2015) was a Canadian writer. Based in Saskatoon, Saskatchewan, he published several novels and a chapbook of poetry and short stories, and hosted a weekly television series, Lit Happens, on Shaw TV's services in Saskatchewan.

Funk, who was gay, was raised in a Mennonite household in rural Mayfair, Saskatchewan. He had a twin sister, who died in childhood.

Funk published his debut novel, Dead Rock Stars, in 2008. Initially self-published, the book later gained national distribution. The novel was republished in audiobook form in 2013, and a new illustrated edition was published in 2015.

In 2012, Funk pulled his book Cherry Blossoms off of bookstore shelves after the publisher inadvertently printed an early draft instead of the final version. The corrected edition was rereleased several weeks later. The book won a Bookie Award from CBC Books in 2013.

In 2014, Funk published the memoir Wes Side Story. In addition to his writing and broadcasting, Funk also worked in social services.

Funk died in his sleep on October 9, 2015, in Edmonton, Alberta. He was only 46 years old. It was thought that he may have accidentally overdosed on painkillers after a surgical procedure. At the time of his death, his short story Rescuing Lancelot had just been published in the literary magazine Jonathan, and his latest novel Frostbite was slated for publication in 2016.

== Works ==
- Humble Beginnings
- Dead Rock Stars (2008)
- Baggage (2010)
- Cherry Blossoms (2012)
- Wes Side Story: a Memoir (2014)
