= Rural Municipality of Round Hill No. 467 =

Rural municipality in Saskatchewan, Canada

Round Hill No. 467
- Rural municipality
- Rural Municipality of Round Hill No. 467
- Location of the RM of Round Hill No. 467 in Saskatchewan
- Coordinates: 53.074°N 108.002°W
- Country: Canada
- Province: Saskatchewan
- Census division: 16
- SARM division: 6
- Formed: December 11, 1911

Government
  - Reeve: Jason Loewen
  - Governing body: RM of Round Hill No. 467 Council
  - Administrator: Christina Moore
  - Office location: Rabbit Lake

Area (2016)
  - Land: 816.12 km^{2} (315.11 sq mi)

Population (2016)
  - Total: 361
  - Density: 0.4/km^{2} (1.0/sq mi)
- Time zone: CST
  - Summer (DST): CST
- Area codes: 306 and 639

The Rural Municipality of Round Hill No. 467 (2016 population: 361) is a rural municipality (RM) in the Canadian province of Saskatchewan within Census Division No. 16 and SARM Division No. 6.

== History ==
The RM of Round Hill No. 467 incorporated as a rural municipality on December 11, 1911.

== Geography ==
=== Communities and localities ===
The following urban municipalities are surrounded by the RM.

Villages

- Rabbit Lake

The following unincorporated communities are within the RM.

Localities

- Bournemouth
- Hatherleigh
- Hillside
- Iffley
- Redfield
- Molewood
- Sandwith
- Square Hill
- Whitkow

== Demographics ==
Population history (1981–2016)
Year	Pop.	±%
1981	452	—
1986	477	+5.5%
1991	461	−3.4%
1996	458	−0.7%
2001	406	−11.4%
2006	374	−7.9%
2011	319	−14.7%
2016	361	+13.2%
Source: Statistics Canada via Saskatchewan Bureau of Statistics

In the 2021 Census of Population conducted by Statistics Canada, the RM of Round Hill No. 467 had a population of 394 living in 167 of its 188 total private dwellings, a change of 9.1% from its 2016 population of 361. With a land area of 809.51 km^{2} (312.55 sq mi), it had a population density of 0.5/km^{2} (1.3/sq mi) in 2021.

In the 2016 Census of Population, the RM of Round Hill No. 467 recorded a population of 361 living in 145 of its 189 total private dwellings, a −19.1% change from its 2011 population of 446. With a land area of 816.12 km^{2} (315.11 sq mi), it had a population density of 0.4/km^{2} (1.1/sq mi) in 2016.

== Attractions ==
- Scentgrass Lake
  - Scent Grass Lake National Migratory Bird Sanctuary

== Government ==
The RM of Round Hill No. 467 is governed by an elected municipal council and an appointed administrator that meets on the second Friday of every month. The reeve of the RM is Jason Loewen while its administrator is Christina Moore. The RM's office is located in Rabbit Lake.

== Transportation ==
- Saskatchewan Highway 324
- Saskatchewan Highway 378
- Saskatchewan Highway 769
- Canadian Pacific Railway (abandoned)

== See also ==
- List of rural municipalities in Saskatchewan
