= Fielding, Saskatchewan =

Community in Saskatchewan, Canada

Fielding
- Unincorporated area
- Location of Fielding in Saskatchewan Fielding (Canada)
- Coordinates: 52°31′0″N 107°32′0″W
- Country: Canada
- Province: Saskatchewan
- Rural Municipalities (RM): Mayfield No. 406
- Post office Founded: 1905-12-01
- Village established: not large enough

Government
  - Mayor: Part of the RM municipal affairs
  - Summer (DST): CST

Fielding, Saskatchewan is an unincorporated area in the Rural Municipality of Mayfield No. 406 in the Canadian province of Saskatchewan. Fielding is located on Saskatchewan Highway 16, the Yellowhead in north-western Saskatchewan. Fielding post office first opened in 1905 at the legal land description of Sec.18, Twp.41, R.11, W3.

The population is smaller than a hamlet, and is counted within the Rural Municipality of Mayfield. Fielding is located just south-east of North Battleford. Fielding is located within 11 kilometres (6.8 mi) of Glenburn Regional Park and within 9 kilometres (5.6 mi) of the Radisson Lake Game Preserve.

== Area statistics ==
- Lat (DMS) 52°31′00″ N
- Long (DMS) 107°32′00″ W
- Dominion Land Survey Sec.18, Twp.41, R.11, W3
- Time zone (cst) UTC−6

== See also ==
- List of communities in Saskatchewan
