= Western Development Museum =

Museum of economic development in Canada

Saskatchewan Western Development Museum

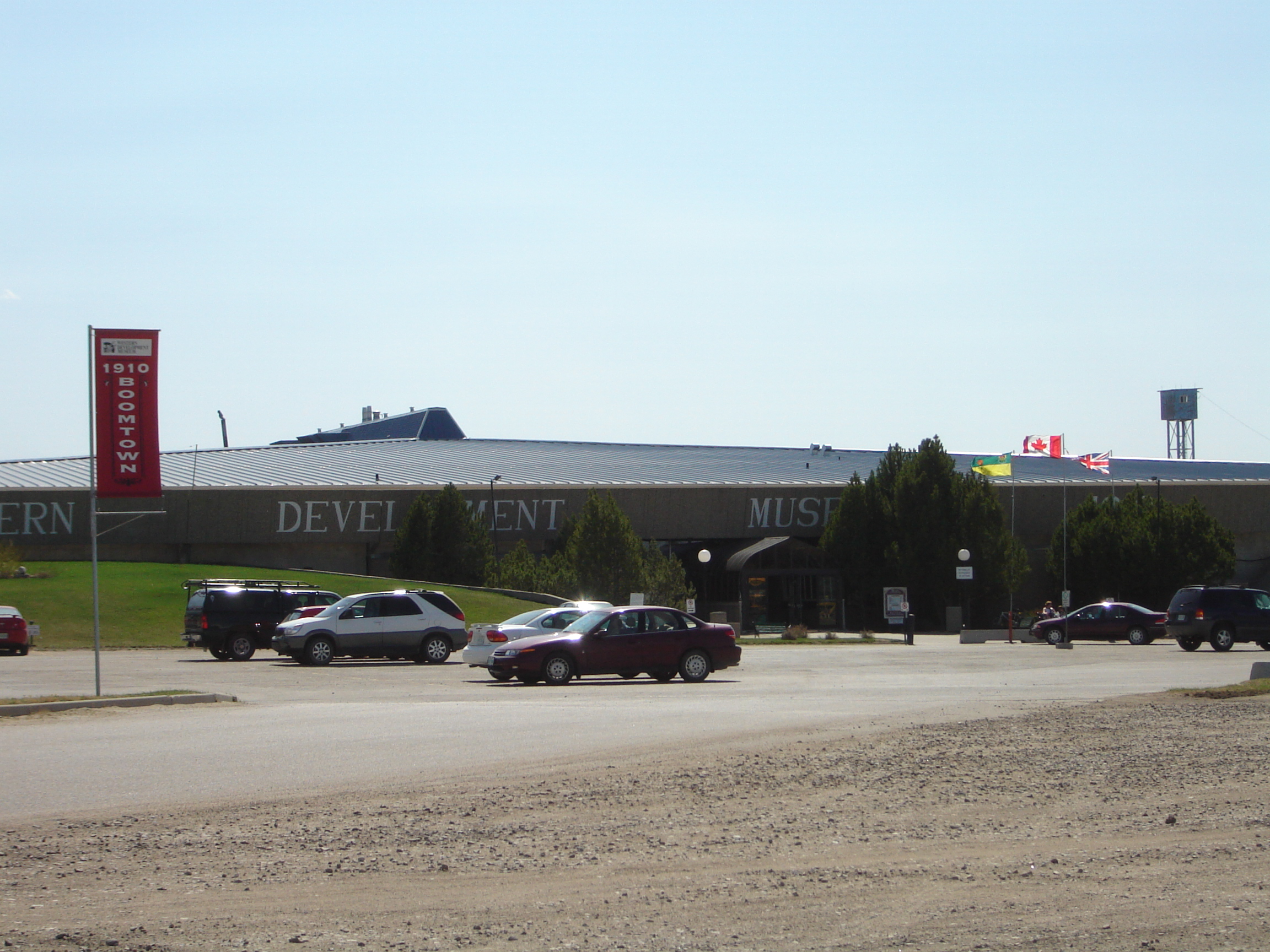
- Saskatoon branch of the Western Development Museum
- Established: April 2, 1949; 77 years ago
- Location: Moose Jaw, North Battleford, Saskatoon and Yorkton.
- Type: Transportation history, agriculture history, economic history, human history
- Director: Joan Kanigan
- Curator: Elisabeth Scott
- Website: wdm.ca

The Western Development Museum is a network of four museums in Saskatchewan, Canada preserving and recording the social and economic development of the province. The museum has branches in Moose Jaw, North Battleford, Saskatoon and Yorkton. Respectively, each branch focuses on a different theme: transportation, agriculture, economy, and people. The museum is affiliated with the Canadian Museums Association, the Canadian Heritage Information Network, and Virtual Museum of Canada.

== History ==
Originally started as a grass-roots movement, the museum was founded with the passage of the Western Development Museum Act in 1949. The first home for the museum in 1949 was a refurbished hangar in North Battleford. Later the same year a similar structure in Saskatoon was converted into a second location for the museum. A third hangar was procured in Yorkton in 1951 and was likewise converted. In 1972, the first purpose-built buildings were constructed to house new locations for the museums in Yorkton and Saskatoon, followed by the addition of a new museum in Moose Jaw in 1976.

== Moose Jaw – History of Transportation ==
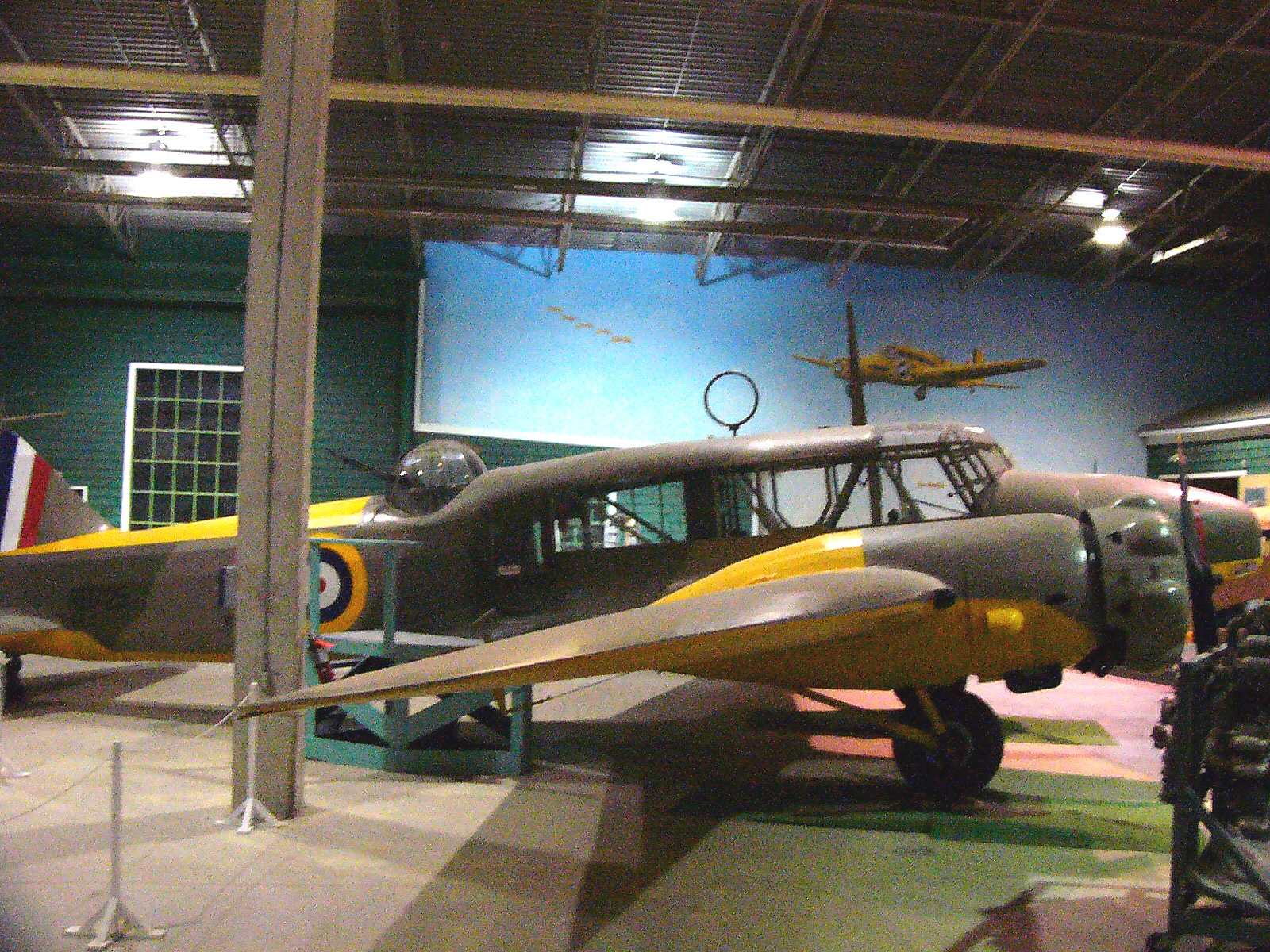
Avro Anson bomber trainer

The Moose Jaw location of the museum is dedicated to all facets of transportation. Its coordinates are 50.4197°N 105.5305°W.

This branch offers a specific focus on aviation, which is appropriate given its proximity to CFB Moose Jaw. The aviation exhibits include a dedicated Snowbirds aerobatic team display. The aircraft collection includes an American Aerolights Eagle ultralight, an Avro Anson bomber trainer, Canadair CT-114 Tutor in Snowbirds markings, Canadair CT-133 Silver Star, Fairchild M63A3 Cornell, and a CT-133 Silver Star ejection seat.

The museum also has the Western Development Museum Short Line, a 3 ft (914 mm) narrow gauge railway outdoors on the property that utilizes the only operating steam locomotive in Saskatchewan.

== North Battleford – Heritage Farm & Village ==
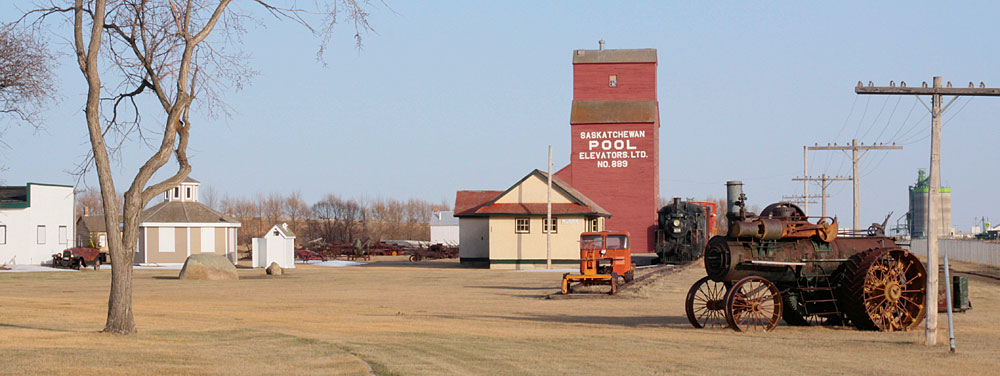
Pioneer village scene in North Battleford

The North Battleford branch of the museum has displays relating to both farm and village aspects of pioneer life. The museum demonstrates how farmers worked the land in the 1920s. The location has a historical village, which includes a grain elevator, a co-operative store, several churches, businesses, and homes. Its coordinates are 52.7538°N 108.2584°W.

The former Saskatchewan Wheat Pool grain elevator No. 889 is from Keatley, Saskatchewan and was moved to the museum grounds in 1983.

== Saskatoon – 1910 Boomtown ==
The Saskatoon branch of the WDM was originally located on 11th Street on the city's west side, where it hosted an annual festival called "Pion-Era". The Saskatoon WDM relocated to its current site on the Prairieland Park grounds in the early 1970s. Its coordinates are 52.0950°N 106.6733°W.

For many years the Saskatoon branch was associated with the Saskatoon Exhibition and was instrumental in the fair being renamed "Pioneer Days", which incorporated Pion-Era. By the 1980s, the WDM and the Exhibition began to distance themselves from each other. By the 1990s the WDM was no longer a part of the exhibition, which in turn all but eliminated any remaining Pion-Era elements; Pioneer Days became "The Ex" and, later, simply "Saskatoon Exhibition".

The Saskatoon WDM is noted for its indoor recreation of a 1910s-era "boomtown". Actual buildings from the era, combined with recreations, are kept in a climate-controlled environment and filled with artifacts of the time (in contrast to the North Battleford WDM, which has its buildings outside). Buildings on site include a homestead, police station, bank, newspaper office (with working printing press), saddle shop, general store, and dentist's office. The museum also includes displays of vintage automobiles and farm equipment. The Saskatoon branch also has convention facilities and is home to the Saskatchewan Agricultural Hall of Fame.

In 2005, the Saskatoon WDM underwent major renovations to its exhibit halls in celebration of Saskatchewan's centennial.

In 2022, the WDM partnered with the Whitecap Dakota First Nation to co-curate a new permanent exhibit, "Wapaha Sk̄a Oyate: Living Our Culture, Sharing Our Community at Pion-Era, 1955 – 69". This exhibit documents the collaboration and friendship between the museum and the First Nation, beginning when "in the 1950s, the museum's first curator, George Shepherd, became friends with then Chief Harry Littlecrow to start Pion-Era, an exhibit in which Indigenous peoples could share their stories from their point of view. This project lasted more than 20 years before it faded". Photographs from Pion-Era were found by WDM staff in 2018, and their rediscovering the connection between their communities led to the collaboration on documenting the history. The project then expanded to not just record more information in the WDM archives, but create a display for the public. The exhibit includes Dakota artifacts, a horse and travois exhibit, photographs, and a historical narrative featuring oral histories and research. On October 11, 2022, the exhibit was officially opened with a ribbon-cutting ceremony at the WDM.

== Yorkton – Story of People ==
The Yorkton branch of the museum is focused on the immigrant experience. It includes scenes illustrating the cultural roots of many of the groups who settled in western Canada, such as Ukrainians, English, Swedes, Germans, Doukhobors and Icelanders. Its coordinates are 51.2177°N 102.4841°W.

The Yorkton WDM hosts a number of permanent exhibits. One exhibit showcases 100 years of the province's history, featuring a timeline from 1905-2005 as well as displays from the mid-19th century Saskatchewan prior to becoming a province. This exhibit also includes presentations in the Saskatchewan Theatre and a log home that was originally built near Theodore, Saskatchewan before being lifted and transported to the WDM in 2002.

Other exhibits include showcase rooms, a railway station mural, a Yorkton local history exhibit, a "Time Square" area designed for children, and a collection showcasing toys from the early 20th century "In a Prairie Attic: Bladon Family Toys".

== Major artifacts ==
Partial list

- The Western Development Museum has the last remaining example of the Ferranti-Packard 6000, a Canadian designed early mainframe computer. It was donated by SaskPower.
- A replica of the Canadian Vickers Vedette is under construction by the Saskatchewan Western Development Museum. In 2003, the WDM acquired part of an original hull, which is displayed as an artifact in condition as found. With plans loaned from the Western Canada Aviation Museum, a group of volunteers from the Vintage Aircraft Restorers undertook the construction. In 2014, the VAR Vendette Project won a Ninety-Nines Canadian Award in Aviation.

== Images ==
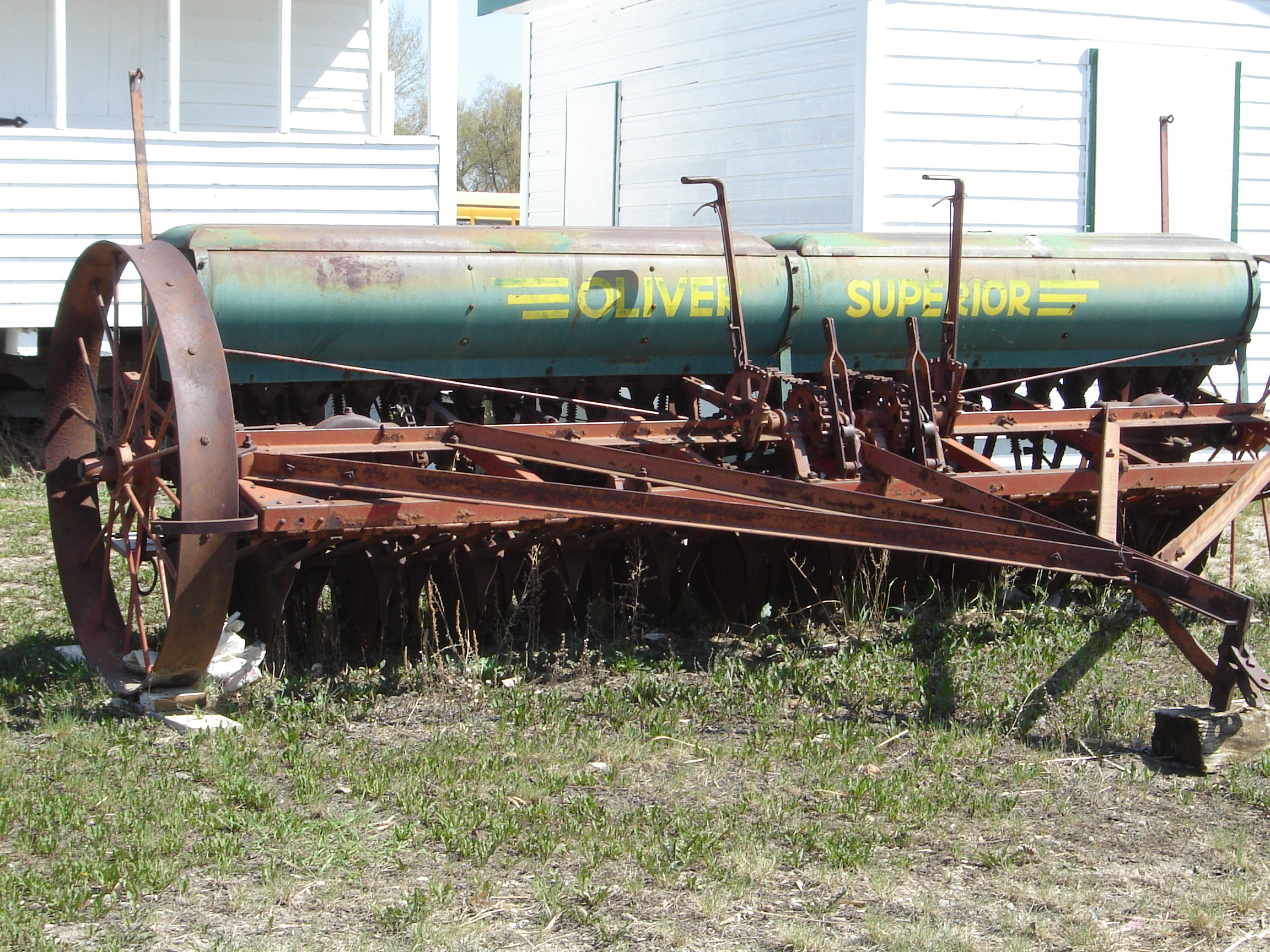
Grain and fertilizer drill

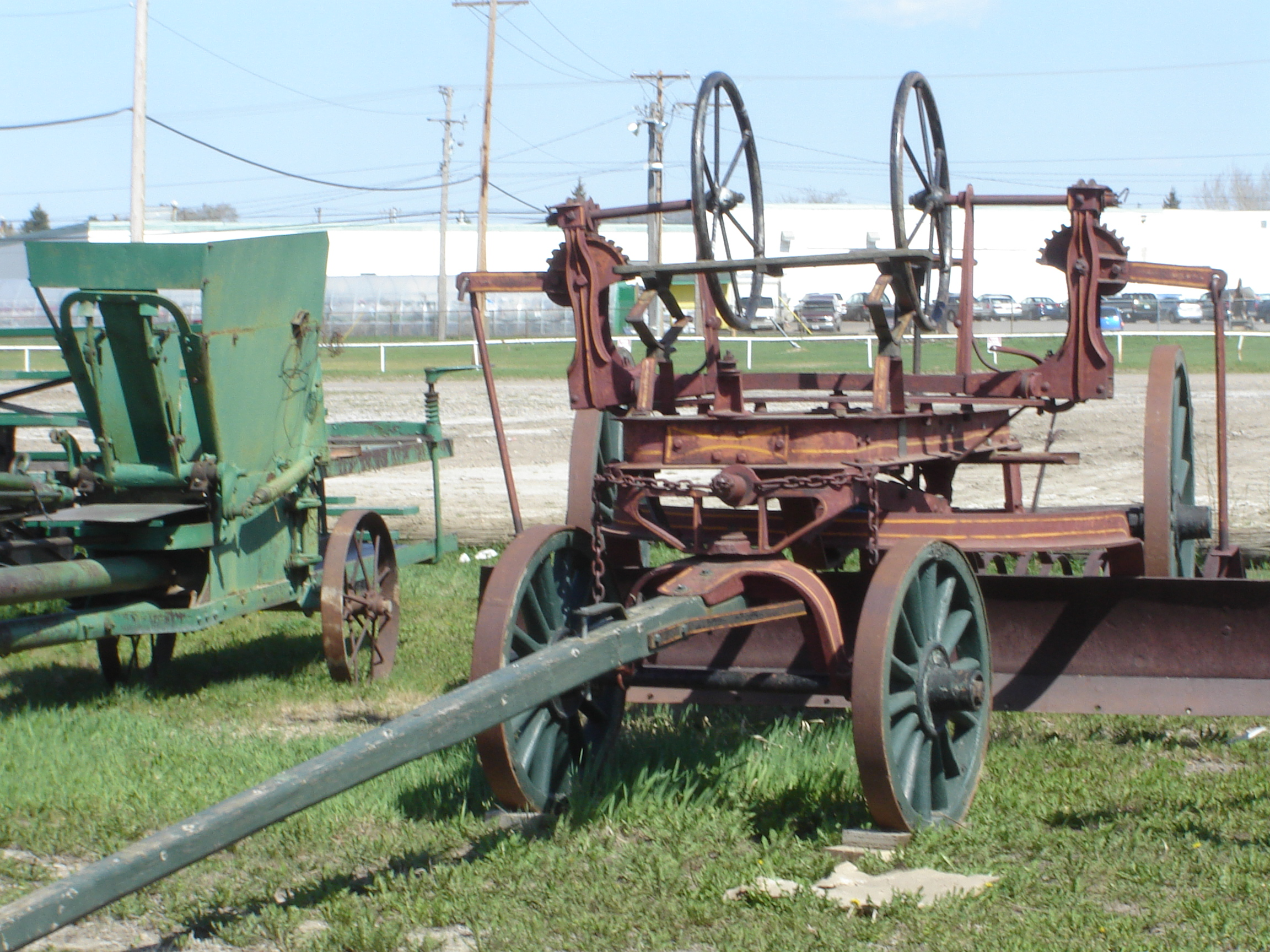
Horse drawn scraper

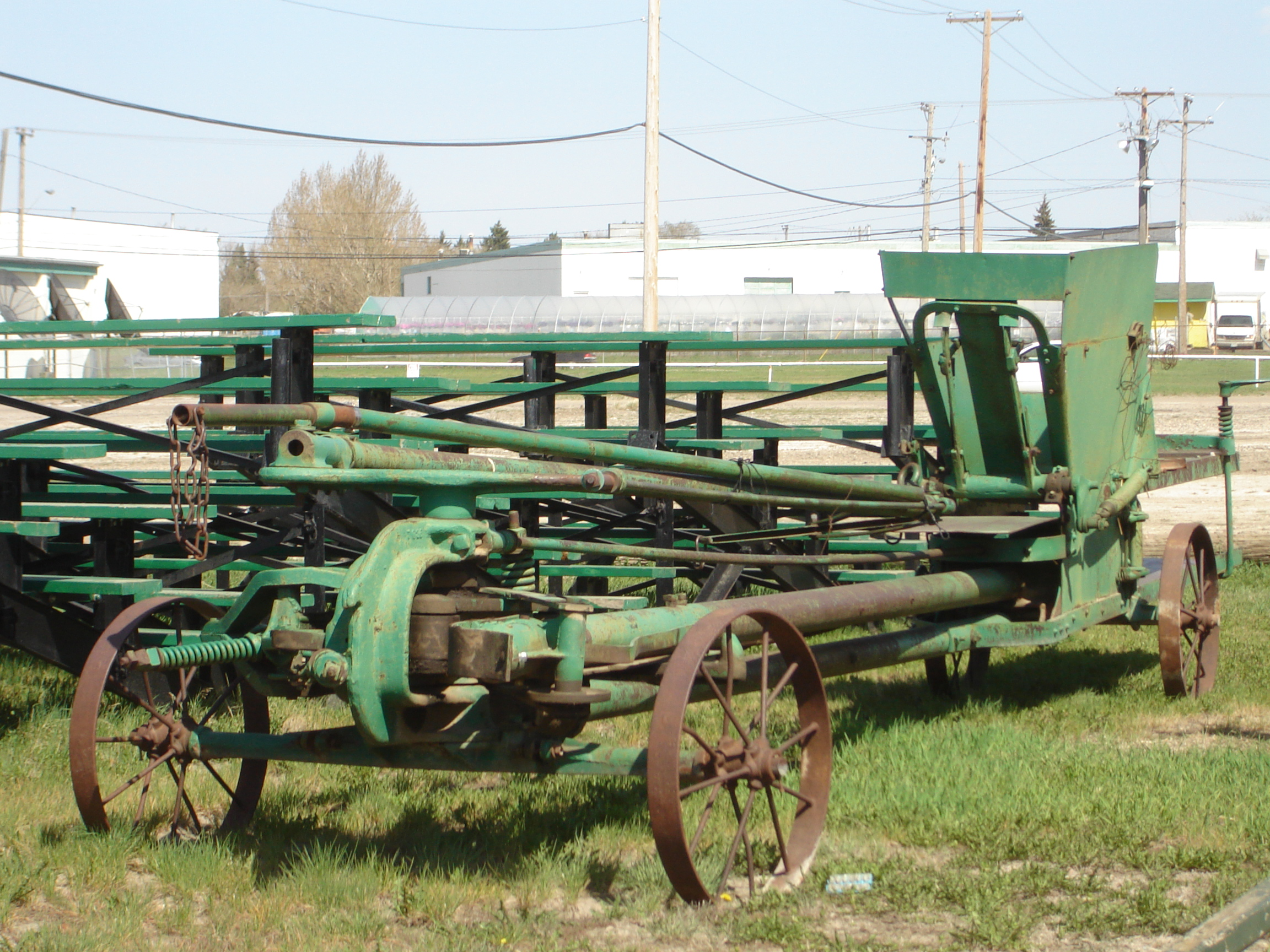
Horse drawn machinery

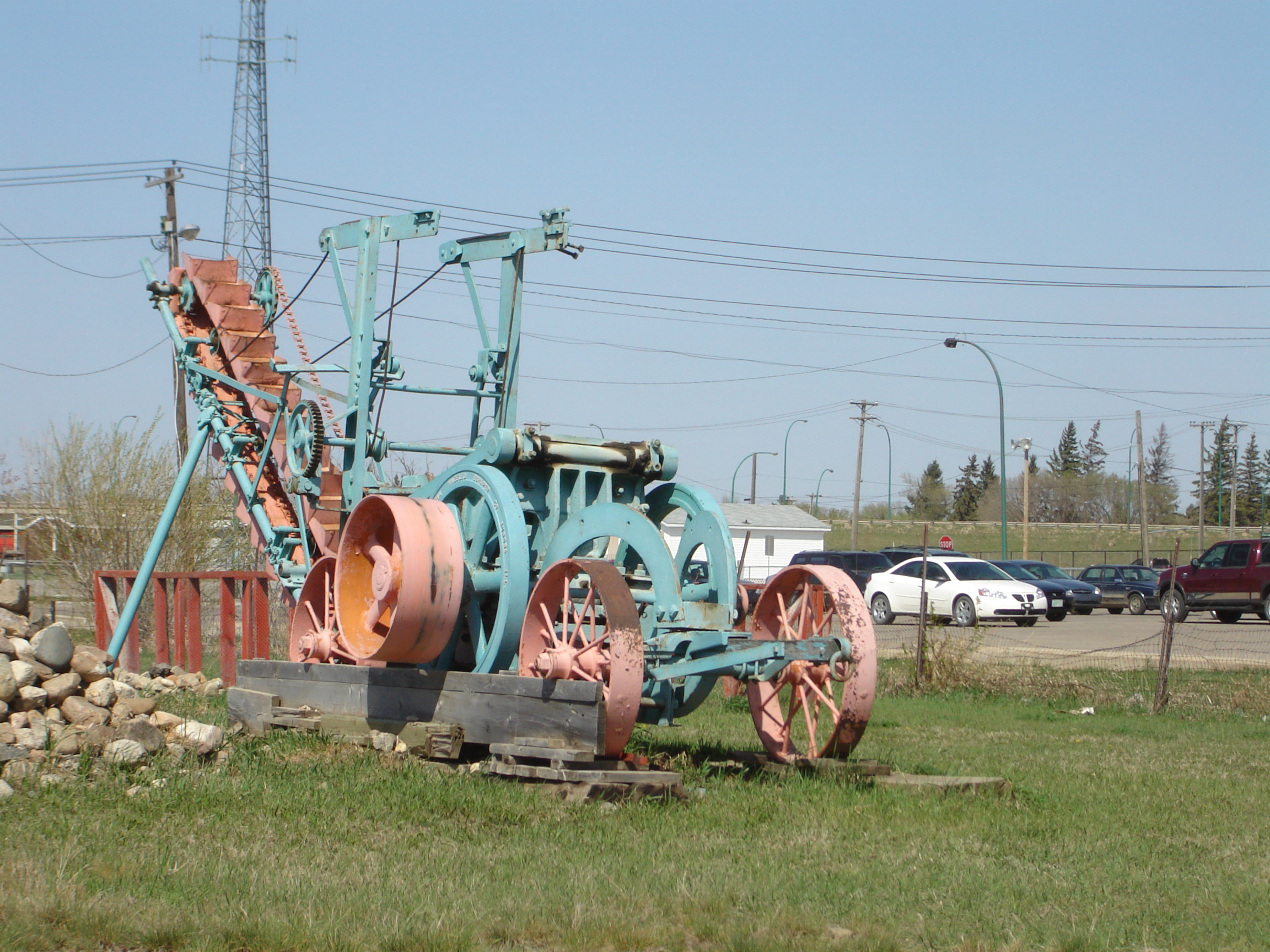
Rock picker

== See also ==
- Saskatchewan Railway Museum
