= Maymont, Saskatchewan =

Village in Saskatchewan, Canada

Village of Maymont
- Village
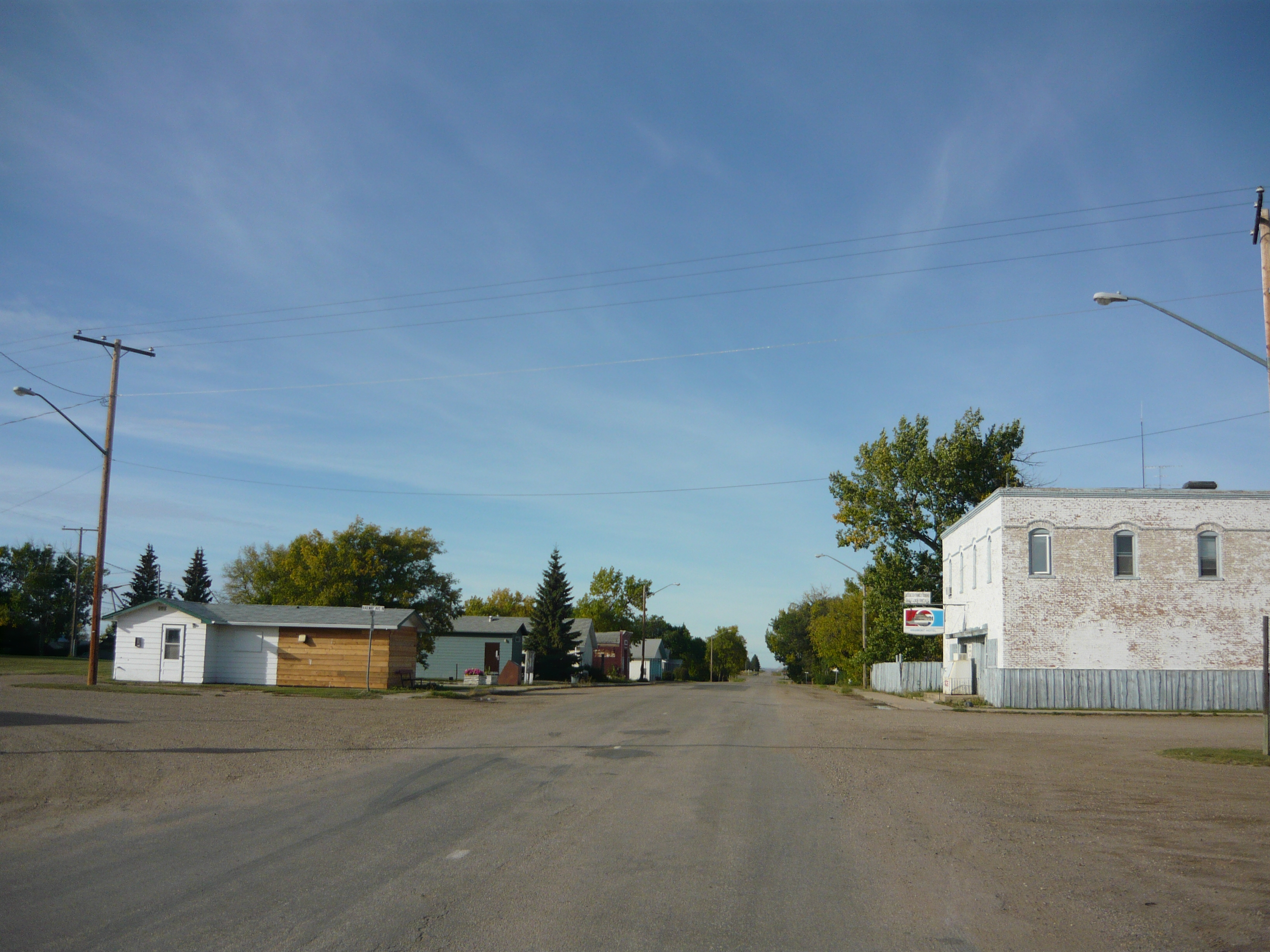
- Main Street

- Location of Maymont in Saskatchewan Village of Maymont (Canada)
- Coordinates: 52.563°N 107.706°W
- Country: Canada
- Province: Saskatchewan
- Region: Saskatchewan
- Census division: 16
- Rural Municipality: Mayfield No. 406
- Date Organized: June 24, 1907
- Incorporated (Village): N/A
- Incorporated (Town): N/A

Government
  - Mayor: Carol Deagnon
  - Administrator: Denise Bernier
  - Governing body: Maymont Village Council

Area
  - Total: 0.66 km^{2} (0.25 sq mi)

Population (2021)
  - Total: 163
  - Density: 248.9/km^{2} (645/sq mi)
- Time zone: UTC−6 (CST)
- Postal code: S0M 1T0
- Area code: 306
- Highways: Hwy 16, Hwy 376

Maymont (2016 population: 138) is a village in the Canadian province of Saskatchewan within the Rural Municipality of Mayfield No. 406 and Census Division No. 16. It is 90 kilometres (56 mi) north-west of the city of Saskatoon.

The village of Maymont was named for May Montgomery. She was a niece to William Mackenzie (of Mackenzie and Mann, railway construction contractors, who built the Canadian Northern Railway through the area in 1905). Montgomery had asked her uncle to name the village Montgomery, but he said he could not because a town in Manitoba already had that name. So, he took her first name and the first syllable of her last name and combined them to form the name Maymont.

Like many other communities in Saskatchewan along the railway line in the early 1900s, Maymont had a grain elevator. Today, Maymont is one of the few towns in Saskatchewan that still has a grain elevator.

== History ==
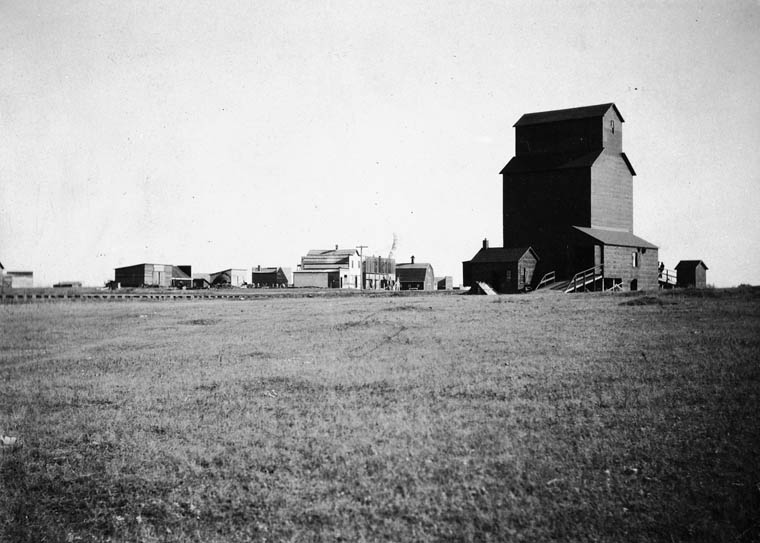
Maymont Grain Elevator

Maymont incorporated as a village on June 24, 1907.

== Demographics ==
Population history (1981–2016)
Year	Pop.	±%
1981	212	—
1986	197	−7.1%
1991	188	−4.6%
1996	156	−17.0%
2001	164	+5.1%
2006	130	−20.7%
2011	146	+12.3%
2016	138	−5.5%
2021	163	+18.1%
Source: Statistics Canada via Saskatchewan Bureau of Statistics

In the 2021 Census of Population conducted by Statistics Canada, Maymont had a population of 163 living in 73 of its 78 total private dwellings, a change of 18.1% from its 2016 population of 138. With a land area of 0.54 km^{2} (0.21 sq mi), it had a population density of 301.9/km^{2} (781.8/sq mi) in 2021.

In the 2016 Census of Population, the Village of Maymont recorded a population of 138 living in 65 of its 78 total private dwellings, a −5.8% change from its 2011 population of 146. With a land area of 0.66 km^{2} (0.25 sq mi), it had a population density of 209.1/km^{2} (541.5/sq mi) in 2016.

== See also ==
- List of communities in Saskatchewan
- List of francophone communities in Saskatchewan
- List of villages in Saskatchewan
