= Struan, Saskatchewan =

Struan
- Locality
- Location within Saskatchewan Location within Canada
- Coordinates: 52°19′0″N 107°36′2″W
- Country: Canada
- Province: Saskatchewan
- Region: Saskatchewan
- Census division: 12
- Rural Municipality: Eagle Creek No. 376

Government
  - Governing body: Eagle Creek Rural Municipality
- Time zone: CST
- Area code: 306
- Highways: Hwy 376, Hwy 784

Struan is an unincorporated community in Eagle Creek Rural Municipality No. 376, Saskatchewan, Canada. The locality is located at the intersection of Highway 376 and Highway 784 about 75 km (47 mi) northwest of Saskatoon.

The community is named for Struan, Perthshire in Scotland, which had been the home of postmaster George R. Peters.

== See also ==
- List of communities in Saskatchewan
