= Meeting Lake =

Lake in Saskatchewan, Canada

- Location in Saskatchewan Meeting Lake (Canada)
- Location: RM of Meeting Lake No. 466 and RM of Spiritwood No. 496, Saskatchewan
- Coordinates: 53.1883°N 107.6531°W
- Type: Endorheic lake
- Part of: Saskatchewan River drainage basin
- Primary outflows: None
- Basin countries: Canada
- Surface area: 1,108.1 ha (2,738 acres)
- Max. depth: 13 m (43 ft)
- Shore length^{1}: 20.8 km (12.9 mi)
- Surface elevation: 739 m (2,425 ft)
- Settlements: Spruce Bay
- ^{1} Shore length is not a well-defined measure.

Meeting Lake is a shallow, fresh water lake in the Canadian province of Saskatchewan. It is about 160 kilometres (99 mi) north-west of Saskatoon in the RMs of Meeting Lake No. 466 and Spiritwood No. 496. There are four small communities along the lake's shore and a regional park. The nearest highway to the lake and its amenities is Highway 378, which runs near its southern shore.

Prior to the settlement of Europeans, the lake was known as the Meeting Place for local Indigenous people. During the North-West Rebellion, the lake was the possible site of a brief encounter between the Métis and the North-West Mounted Police.

== Description ==
Meeting Lake is situated in the Boreal Transition ecozone of Canada. The region is characterized by rolling hills, boreal forests, and farmland. Meeting Lake is fed by small streams from nearby hills, such as the Thickwood Hills to the south and south-east, spring runoff, and seasonal rains. It has no natural outlet and, due to increased annual precipitation since 2011, lake levels have risen to a record high of 739 m (2,425 ft) above sea level. This has caused some flooding of cabins and the regional park. Dykes and berms have been built to help protect property while a long-term solution is sought. The option to build a canal to control water levels has been looked at "but the process is a long one and would be difficult".

== Communities ==
In the RM of Spiritwood, on the north eastern shore, are the communities of Spruce Bay and Moose Range. Along the north-eastern shore is Mosquito, Grizzly Bear's Head, Lean Man Indian reserve. In the RM of Meeting Lake, along the southern shore, are the two small hamlets of Crescent Beach and Shady Bay.

== Meeting Lake Regional Park ==
Meeting Lake Regional Park (53.1959°N 107.7089°W) was founded in 1965 and is located about 10 kilometres (6.2 mi) north-east of Rabbit Lake at the western end of Meeting Lake in the RM of Spiritwood. The park has a campground, cabin rentals, 18-hole minigolf, dance hall, marina, ball diamonds, sandy beach, boat launch, and a picnic area. The campground has 37 sites, laundry, washrooms, and showers.

== Fish species ==
Fish species commonly found in Meeting Lake include walleye, northern pike, and yellow perch. The lake was last stocked with 300,000 walleye fry in 2022.

== See also ==
- List of lakes of Saskatchewan
