= Crooked Trees =

Mutated trees in Saskatchewan, Canada

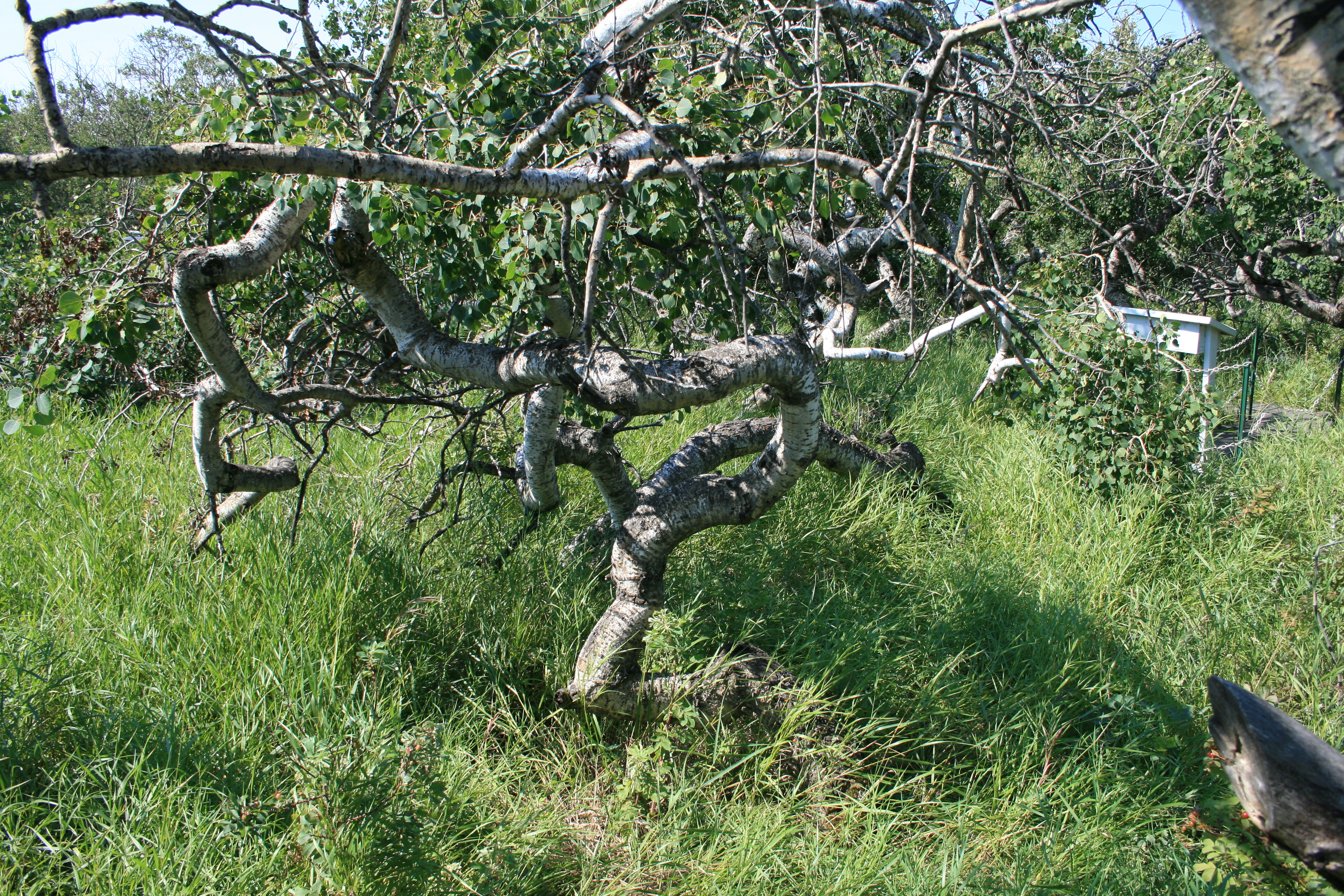
- Crooked Trees

- Location within Saskatchewan Location within Canada
- Species: Aspen (Populus tremuloides)
- Location: RM of Douglas No. 436, Saskatchewan, Canada
- Coordinates: 52°52′16″N 107°32′13″W
- Height: 6 m (20 ft)
- Date seeded: 1940s

The Crooked Trees, Crooked Bush, Twisted Trees, or the Crooked Trees of Alticane are a 3-acre (1.2 ha) grove of deformed trembling aspen trees of type Populus tremuloides Michx. found in the Canadian province of Saskatchewan. They are approximately 20 kilometres (12 mi) north-northwest of the town of Hafford and just over 5 kilometres (3.1 mi) south-west of Alticane in the Rural Municipality of Douglas No. 436. The trees are on the southern slopes of the Thickwood Hills and within the Redberry Lake Biosphere Reserve.

== Description ==
The Crooked Trees, prominent in Saskatchewan folklore, are dramatically different from the un-twisted aspens just across the road. Explanations have been offered which include various paranormal factors. However, cuttings from these trees, propagated in Manitoba, exhibit the same pattern of twisted growth, suggesting that the cause is rooted in genetics, possibly the result of a mutation.

The trees' unusual appearance was noticed in the 1940s and has attracted the attention of tourists for decades, but more so since the proliferation of websites and blogs that mention them. A wooden walkway was constructed through the grove to keep visitors from trampling any new growth.

Because the deformity is likely genetic and aspens propagate by root suckers, it is likely that all the crooked trees in the grove are clones that originated from a single mutated tree. The grove is currently bounded on all sides by the grid road and a perimeter access road, so the size of the grove is static and is unlikely to continue spreading.

The grove can be seen in the Disney true life adventure/fantasy film Perri (1957).

== Gallery ==
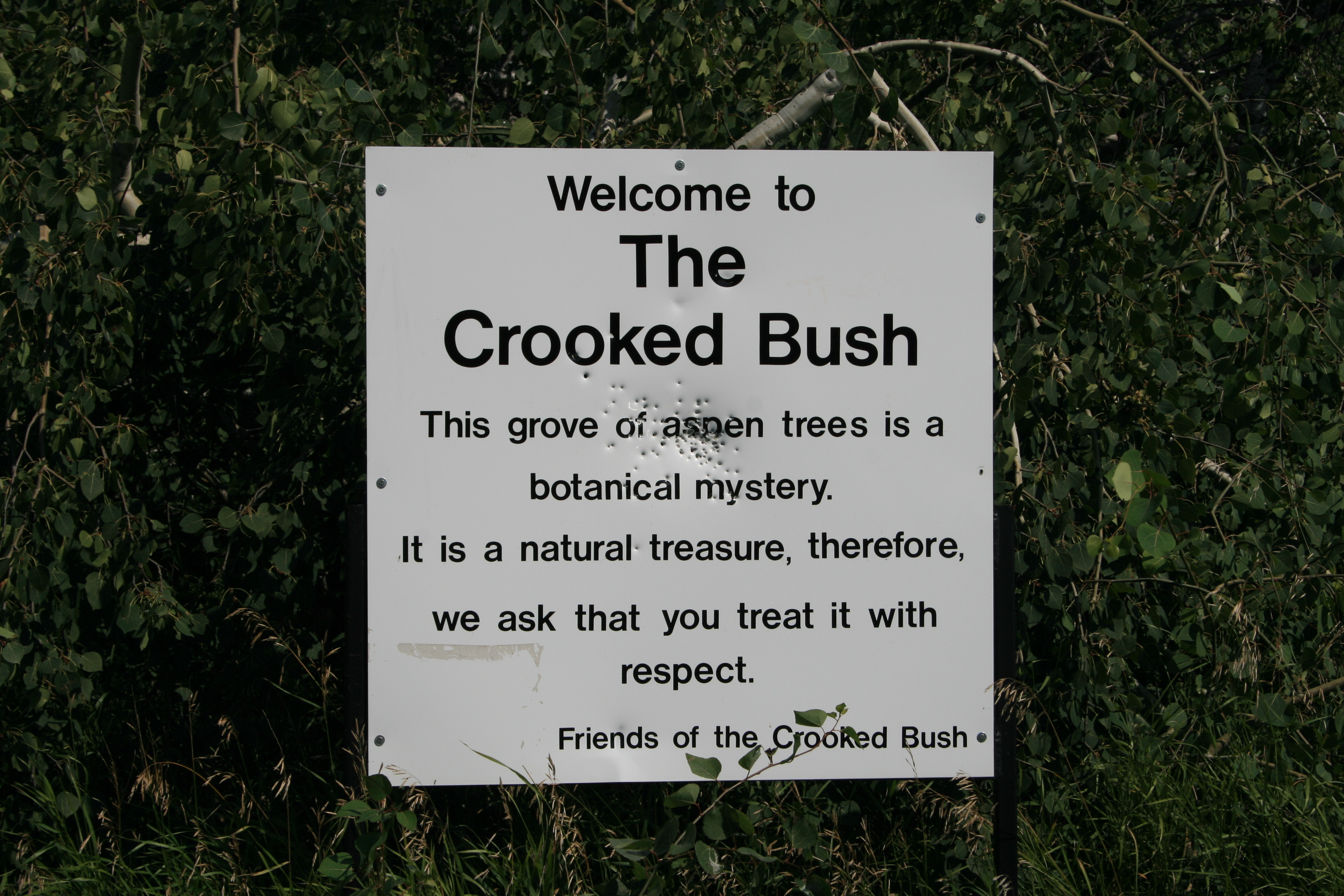
Sign at the site of the Crooked Trees

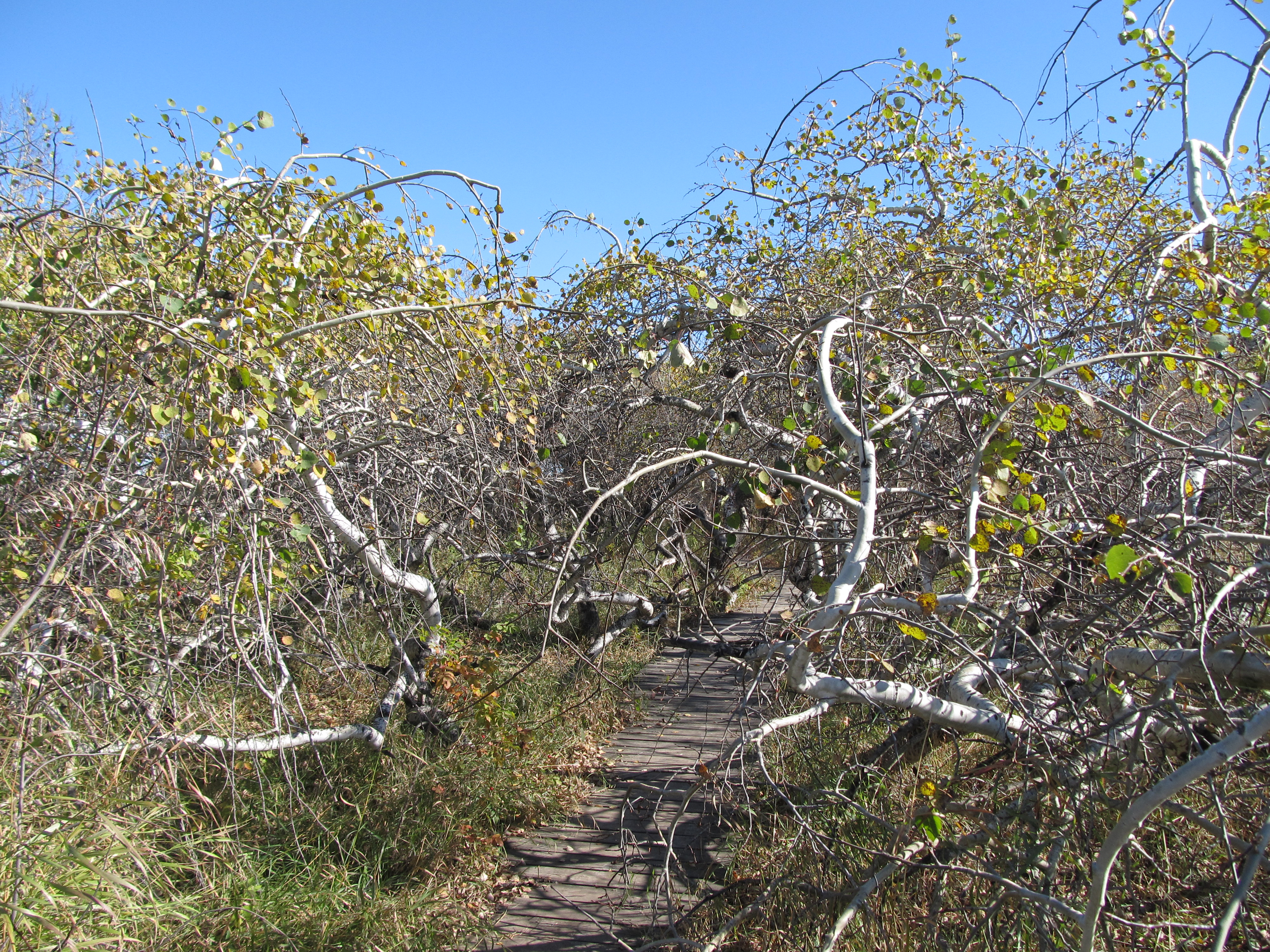

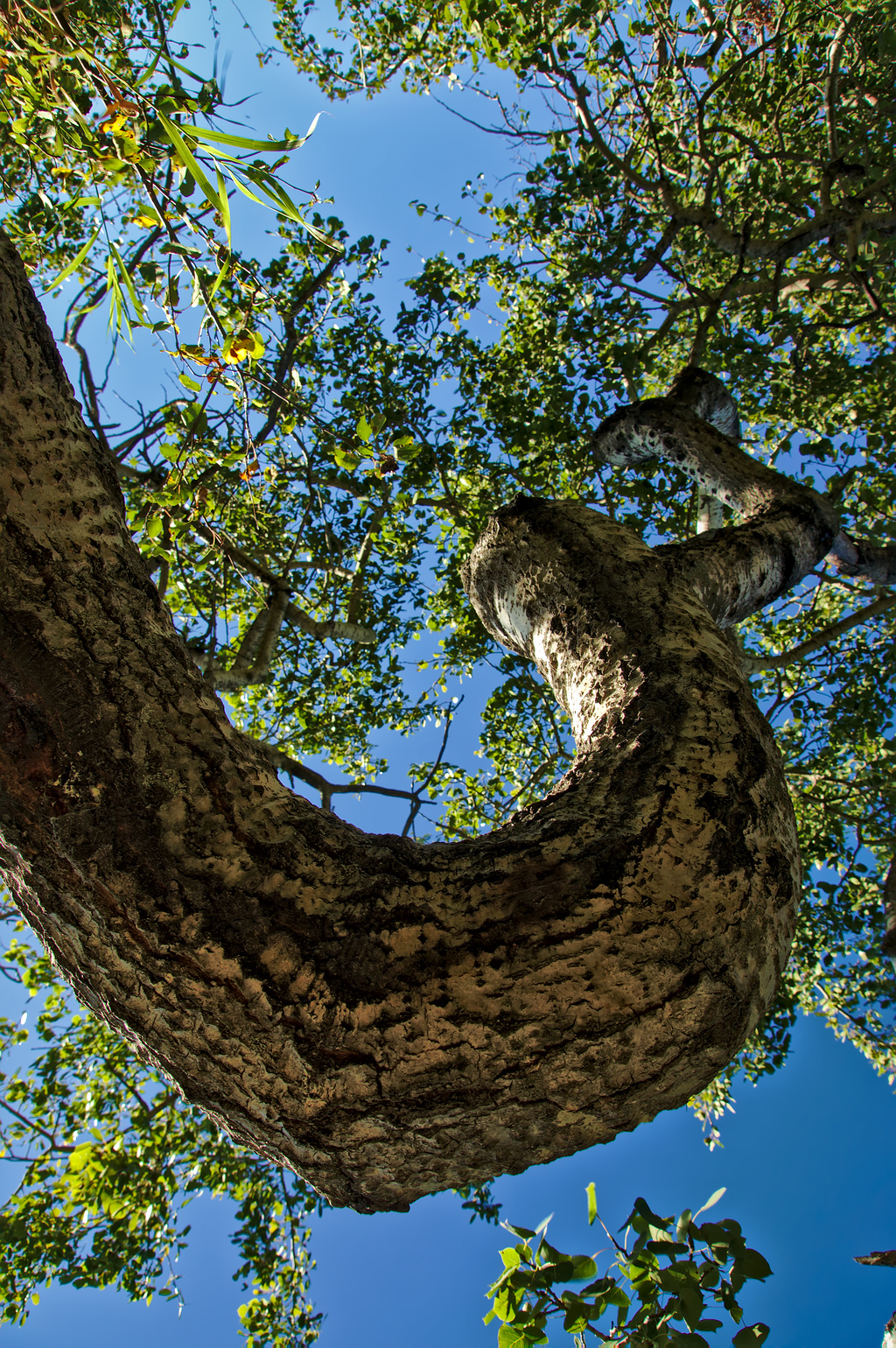

== See also ==
- List of individual trees
- Tourism in Saskatchewan
