= Ruddell, Saskatchewan =

Village in Saskatchewan, Canada

Ruddle
- Village
- Village of Ruddell
- Location of Ruddell in Saskatchewan Ruddle (Canada)
- Coordinates: 52°36′0″N 107°51′0″W
- Country: Canada
- Province: Saskatchewan
- Region: West-central
- Census division: 16
- Rural Municipality: Mayfield No. 406
- Post office Founded: 1906-01-15

Government
  - Type: Municipal
  - Governing body: Ruddle Village Council
  - Mayor: Linda Mushka
  - Administrator: Darrin Beaudoin

Area
  - Total: 0.47 km^{2} (0.18 sq mi)

Population (2006)
  - Total: 20
  - Density: 42.5/km^{2} (110/sq mi)
- Time zone: CST
- Postal code: S0M 2S0
- Area code: 306
- Highways: Highway 16
- Railways: Canadian National Railway

Ruddell (2016 population: 20) is a village in the Canadian province of Saskatchewan within the Rural Municipality of Mayfield No. 406 and Census Division No. 16. The village is located on Highway 16 (more commonly known as the Yellowhead Highway), approximately 37 kilometres (23 mi) east of the city of North Battleford and 102 kilometres (63 mi) west of the city of Saskatoon. Ruddell post office first opened in 1906.

== History ==
Ruddell incorporated as a village on March 18, 1914.

== Demographics ==
Population history (1981–2016)
Year	Pop.	±%
1981	27	—
1986	33	+22.2%
1991	31	−6.1%
1996	24	−22.6%
2001	25	+4.2%
2006	20	−20.0%
2011	20	+0.0%
2016	20	+0.0%
Source: Statistics Canada via Saskatchewan Bureau of Statistics

In the 2021 Census of Population conducted by Statistics Canada, Ruddell had a population of 20 living in 9 of its 11 total private dwellings, a change of 0% from its 2016 population of 20. With a land area of 0.47 km^{2} (0.18 sq mi), it had a population density of 42.6/km^{2} (110.2/sq mi) in 2021.

In the 2016 Census of Population, the Village of Ruddell recorded a population of 20 living in 10 of its 15 total private dwellings, a 0% change from its 2011 population of 20. With a land area of 0.47 km^{2} (0.18 sq mi), it had a population density of 42.6/km^{2} (110.2/sq mi) in 2016.

== See also ==
- List of communities in Saskatchewan
- List of villages in Saskatchewan
