= Rural Municipality of Eagle Creek No. 376 =

Rural municipality in Saskatchewan, Canada

Eagle Creek No. 376
- Rural municipality
- Rural Municipality of Eagle Creek No. 376
- Location of the RM of Eagle Creek No. 376 in Saskatchewan
- Coordinates: 52.345°N 107.540°W
- Country: Canada
- Province: Saskatchewan
- Census division: 12
- SARM division: 5
- Formed: December 13, 1909

Government
  - Reeve: Wendy Davis
  - Governing body: RM of Eagle Creek No. 376 Council
  - Administrator: Trent Smith
  - Office location: Asquith

Area (2016)
  - Land: 833.08 km^{2} (321.65 sq mi)

Population (2016)
  - Total: 595
  - Density: 0.7/km^{2} (1.8/sq mi)
- Time zone: CST
  - Summer (DST): CST
- Area codes: 306 and 639

The Rural Municipality of Eagle Creek No. 376 (2016 population: 595) is a rural municipality (RM) in the Canadian province of Saskatchewan within Census Division No. 12 and SARM Division No. 5. It is located west of the City of Saskatoon.

== History ==
The RM of Eagle Creek No. 376 incorporated as a rural municipality on December 13, 1909.

== Geography ==
=== Communities and localities ===
The following unincorporated communities are located within the RM.

Localities

- Arelee (dissolved as a village)
- Enviren
- Sonningdale
- Struan

== Demographics ==
Population history (1981–2016)
Year	Pop.	±%
1981	623	—
1986	592	−5.0%
1991	554	−6.4%
1996	601	+8.5%
2001	564	−6.2%
2006	552	−2.1%
2011	580	+5.1%
2016	595	+2.6%
Source: Statistics Canada via Saskatchewan Bureau of Statistics

In the 2021 Census of Population conducted by Statistics Canada, the RM of Eagle Creek No. 376 had a population of 643 living in 161 of its 216 total private dwellings, a change of 8.1% from its 2016 population of 595. With a land area of 822.29 km^{2} (317.49 sq mi), it had a population density of 0.8/km^{2} (2.0/sq mi) in 2021.

In the 2016 Census of Population, the RM of Eagle Creek No. 376 recorded a population of 595 living in 149 of its 163 total private dwellings, a 2.6% change from its 2011 population of 580. With a land area of 833.08 km^{2} (321.65 sq mi), it had a population density of 0.7/km^{2} (1.8/sq mi) in 2016.

== Government ==
The RM of Eagle Creek No. 376 is governed by an elected municipal council and an appointed administrator that meets on the second Tuesday of every month. The reeve of the RM is Wendy Davis while its administrator is Trent Smith. The RM's office is located in Asquith.

== See also ==
- List of rural municipalities in Saskatchewan
