= Keatley, Saskatchewan =

Community in Saskatchewan, Canada

Keatley
- Unincorporated community
- Location within Saskatchewan Location within Canada
- Coordinates: 52.800000°N 107.466667°W
- Country: Canada
- Province: Saskatchewan
- Census division: 16
- Rural municipality: Douglas No. 436

Government
  - Governing body: Douglas No. 436
- Time zone: CST
- Area code: 306

Keatley is an unincorporated community in the Rural Municipality of Douglas No. 436, Saskatchewan, Canada. The community is located 60 kilometres northeast of the city of North Battleford.

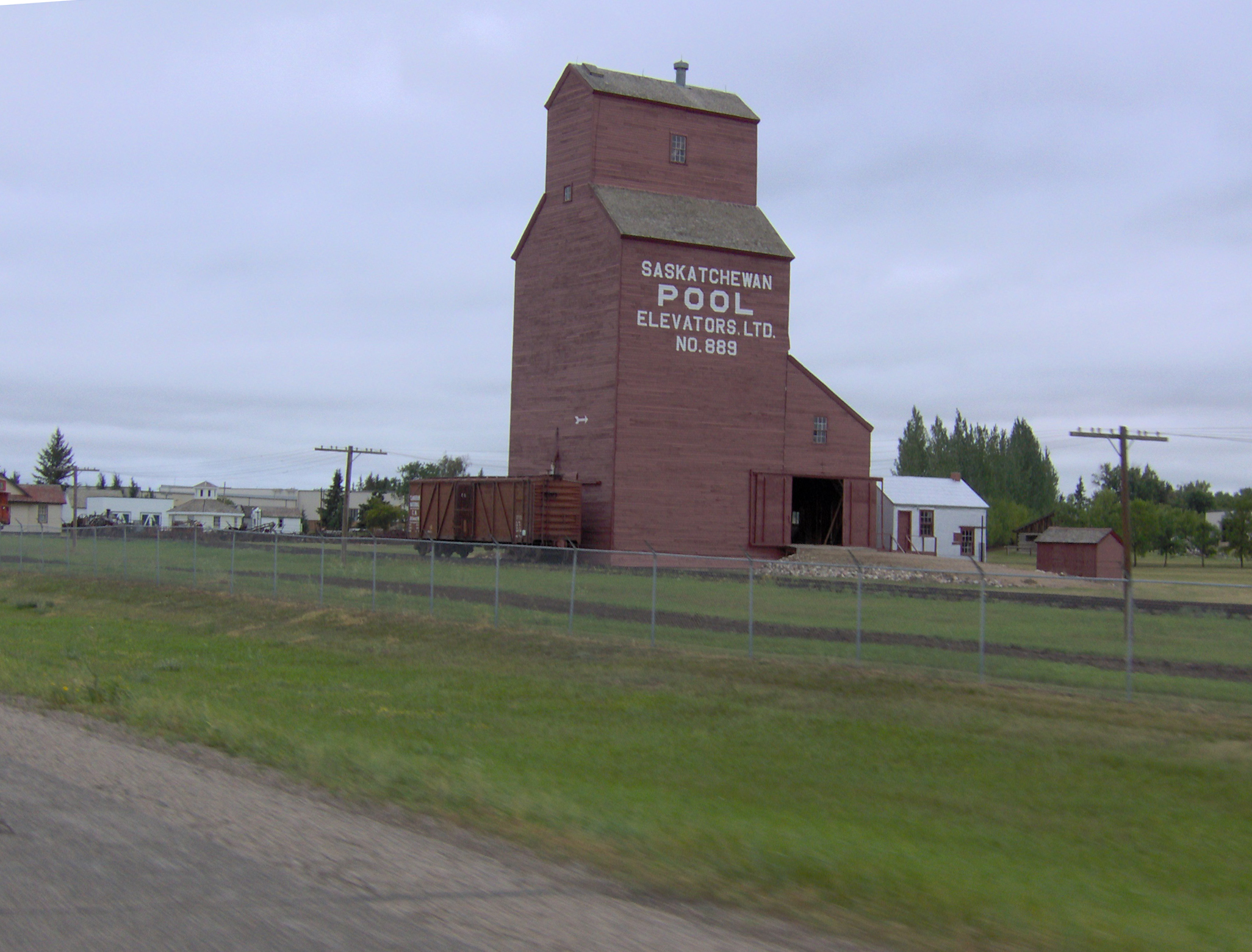
The former Saskatchewan Wheat Pool elevator No. 889 from Keatley. Moved to the North Battleford Western Development Museum in 1983. North Battleford Western Development Museum - Keatley grain elevator

== See also ==
- List of communities in Saskatchewan
