= Mullingar, Saskatchewan =

Mullingar
- Hamlet
- Location of Mullingar in Saskatchewan
- Coordinates: 53.0836°N 107.6619°W
- Country: Canada
- Province: Saskatchewan
- Census division: 16
- Rural Municipality: Meeting Lake
- Post office Founded: May 1, 1907
- Incorporated (Village): N/A
- Incorporated (Town): N/A

Government
  - Governing body: Mullingar Village Council

Area
  - Total: 0.09 km^{2} (0.035 sq mi)

Population (2011)
  - Total: 0
  - Density: 0/km^{2} (0/sq mi)
  - National Population Rank: 6,384,515
- Time zone: CST
- Postal code: S0M 2A0

Mullingar is a hamlet in the Canadian province of Saskatchewan, located 25 kilometres south-southwest of Spiritwood, 40 kilometres southeast of Glaslyn and about seven kilometres from Rabbit Lake.

It was named after the town of Mullingar in Ireland.

== History ==
Mullingar was established in 1909 by Charles and Mark Comerford and their families. They left Eldorado, Ontario, and homesteaded in the Mullingar district in 1906. In 1907, a country post office was erected and the name "Mullingar" was chosen by Mark Comerford; to choose he closed his eyes and pointed to a map of Ireland. Charles Comerford was then the first postmaster of Mullingar. He was also one of the five township organizers to pave the way for its local improvement district, and was Reeve for the RM #466 for 19 years. Mullingar was and still is a farming community. Although the original post office is not there, the postal code and boxes are still used.
