= Arelee =

- Hamlet
- Location within Saskatchewan Location within Canada
- Coordinates: 52°15′0″N 107°30′2″W
- Country: Canada
- Province: Saskatchewan
- Census division: 12
- Rural Municipality: Eagle Creek No. 376
- Time zone: CST
- Area code: 306
- Highways: Hwy 376

Arelee is an unincorporated community in central Saskatchewan, Canada, approximately 60 km (37 mi) west of Saskatoon. It is located in the Rural Municipality of Eagle Creek No. 376. The RM's offices constitute one of the only businesses in the community.

Prior to March 21, 2002, Arelee was a village, but it was restructured as an unincorporated community on that date.

The large white church at the north end of the community is the Arelee Mennonite Brethren church. It was founded in 1908, and held its final service in 2008. The church is now the Secret Garden Retreat event venue.

== Demographics ==
In the 2021 Census of Population conducted by Statistics Canada, Arelee had a population of 10 living in 8 of its 10 total private dwellings, a change of 0% from its 2016 population of 10. With a land area of 0.3 km^{2} (0.12 sq mi), it had a population density of 33.3/km^{2} (86.3/sq mi) in 2021.
