= Rural Municipality of Meeting Lake No. 466 =

Rural municipality in Saskatchewan, Canada

Meeting Lake No. 466
- Rural municipality
- Rural Municipality of Meeting Lake No. 466
- Location of the RM of Meeting Lake No. 466 in Saskatchewan
- Coordinates: 53.009°N 107.324°W
- Country: Canada
- Province: Saskatchewan
- Census division: 16
- SARM division: 6
- Formed: January 1, 1913

Government
  - Reeve: Randy Aumack
  - Governing body: RM of Meeting Lake No. 466 Council
  - Administrator: Janelle Lavallee
  - Office location: Mayfair

Area (2016)
  - Land: 1,066.74 km^{2} (411.87 sq mi)

Population (2016)
  - Total: 319
  - Density: 0.3/km^{2} (0.78/sq mi)
- Time zone: CST
  - Summer (DST): CST
- Area codes: 306 and 639

The Rural Municipality of Meeting Lake No. 466 (2016 population: 319) is a rural municipality (RM) in the Canadian province of Saskatchewan within Census Division No. 16 and SARM Division No. 6.

== History ==
The RM of Meeting Lake No. 466 incorporated as a rural municipality on January 1, 1913. It is named after the lake of the same name that lies in the northern part of the R.M.

== Geography ==
=== Communities and localities ===
The following unincorporated communities are within the RM.

Organized hamlets

- Mayfair
- Mullingar

Localities

- Crescent Beach
- Green Canyon
- Lorenzo
- Meeting Lake
- Oscar Lake
- Ravenhead
- Sand Beach
- Shady Bay

== Demographics ==
Population history (1981–2016)
Year	Pop.	±%
1981	807	—
1986	715	−11.4%
1991	696	−2.7%
1996	508	−27.0%
2001	453	−10.8%
2006	429	−5.3%
2011	376	−12.4%
2016	319	−15.2%
Source: Statistics Canada via Saskatchewan Bureau of Statistics

In the 2021 Census of Population conducted by Statistics Canada, the RM of Meeting Lake No. 466 had a population of 335 living in 152 of its 223 total private dwellings, a change of 5% from its 2016 population of 319. With a land area of 1,043.34 km^{2} (402.84 sq mi), it had a population density of 0.3/km^{2} (0.8/sq mi) in 2021.

In the 2016 Census of Population, the RM of Meeting Lake No. 466 recorded a population of 319 living in 138 of its 220 total private dwellings, a −15.2% change from its 2011 population of 376. With a land area of 1,066.74 km^{2} (411.87 sq mi), it had a population density of 0.3/km^{2} (0.8/sq mi) in 2016.

== Government ==
The RM of Meeting Lake No. 466 is governed by an elected municipal council and an appointed administrator that meets on the second Thursday of every month. The reeve of the RM is Randy Aumack while its administrator is Janelle Lavallee. The RM's office is located in Mayfair.

== Transportation ==
- Saskatchewan Highway 324
- Saskatchewan Highway 376
- Saskatchewan Highway 686

== See also ==
- List of rural municipalities in Saskatchewan
