= Rural Municipality of Mayfield No. 406 =

Rural municipality in Saskatchewan, Canada

Mayfield No. 406
- Rural municipality
- Rural Municipality of Mayfield No. 406
- Location of the RM of Mayfield No. 406 in Saskatchewan
- Coordinates: 52.574°N 107.852°W
- Country: Canada
- Province: Saskatchewan
- Census division: 16
- SARM division: 6
- Formed: December 13, 1909

Government
  - Reeve: Craig Hamilton
  - Governing body: RM of Mayfield No. 406 Council
  - Administrator: Brenda Appleton
  - Office location: Maymont

Area (2016)
  - Land: 782.5 km^{2} (302.1 sq mi)

Population (2016)
  - Total: 377
  - Density: 0.5/km^{2} (1.3/sq mi)
- Time zone: CST
  - Summer (DST): CST
- Area codes: 306 and 639

The Rural Municipality of Mayfield No. 406 (2016 population: 377) is a rural municipality (RM) in the Canadian province of Saskatchewan within Census Division No. 16 and SARM Division No. 6.

== History ==
The RM of Mayfield No. 406 incorporated as a rural municipality on December 13, 1909. The RM's name is a portmanteau of Maymont and Fielding.

== Geography ==
=== Communities and localities ===
The following urban municipalities are surrounded by the RM.

Villages

- Denholm
- Maymont
- Ruddell

The following unincorporated communities are within the RM.

Localities

- Fielding
- Lilac

== Glenburn Regional Park ==
Glenburn Regional Park (52.4956°N 107.7017°W) is a regional park in the RM of Mayfield on the north bank of North Saskatchewan River about 8 kilometres (5.0 mi) south of the village of Maymont. The park is near the location of the former Maymont Ferry, which operated crossing the North Saskatchewan River from 1926 to 1975. Access to the park is from Highway 376.

The park has a campground with 61 campsites, ball diamonds, a 3-hole grass greens golf course, disc golf, a man-made swimming pool that is spring fed, access to the river, and hiking trails.

== Demographics ==
Population history (1981–2016)
Year	Pop.	±%
1981	573	—
1986	580	+1.2%
1991	528	−9.0%
1996	484	−8.3%
2001	440	−9.1%
2006	394	−10.5%
2011	389	−1.3%
2016	377	−3.1%
Source: Statistics Canada via Saskatchewan Bureau of Statistics

In the 2021 Census of Population conducted by Statistics Canada, the RM of Mayfield No. 406 had a population of 391 living in 158 of its 172 total private dwellings, a change of 3.7% from its 2016 population of 377. With a land area of 780.54 km^{2} (301.37 sq mi), it had a population density of 0.5/km^{2} (1.3/sq mi) in 2021.

In the 2016 Census of Population, the RM of Mayfield No. 406 recorded a population of 377 living in 158 of its 172 total private dwellings, a −3.1% change from its 2011 population of 389. With a land area of 782.5 km^{2} (302.1 sq mi), it had a population density of 0.5/km^{2} (1.2/sq mi) in 2016.

== Government ==
The RM of Mayfield No. 406 is governed by an elected municipal council and an appointed administrator that meets on the second Wednesday of every month. The reeve of the RM is Craig Hamilton while its administrator is Brenda Appleton. The RM's office is located in Maymont.
