= Denholm, Saskatchewan =

Village in Saskatchewan, Canada

Denholm
- Village
- Village of Denholm
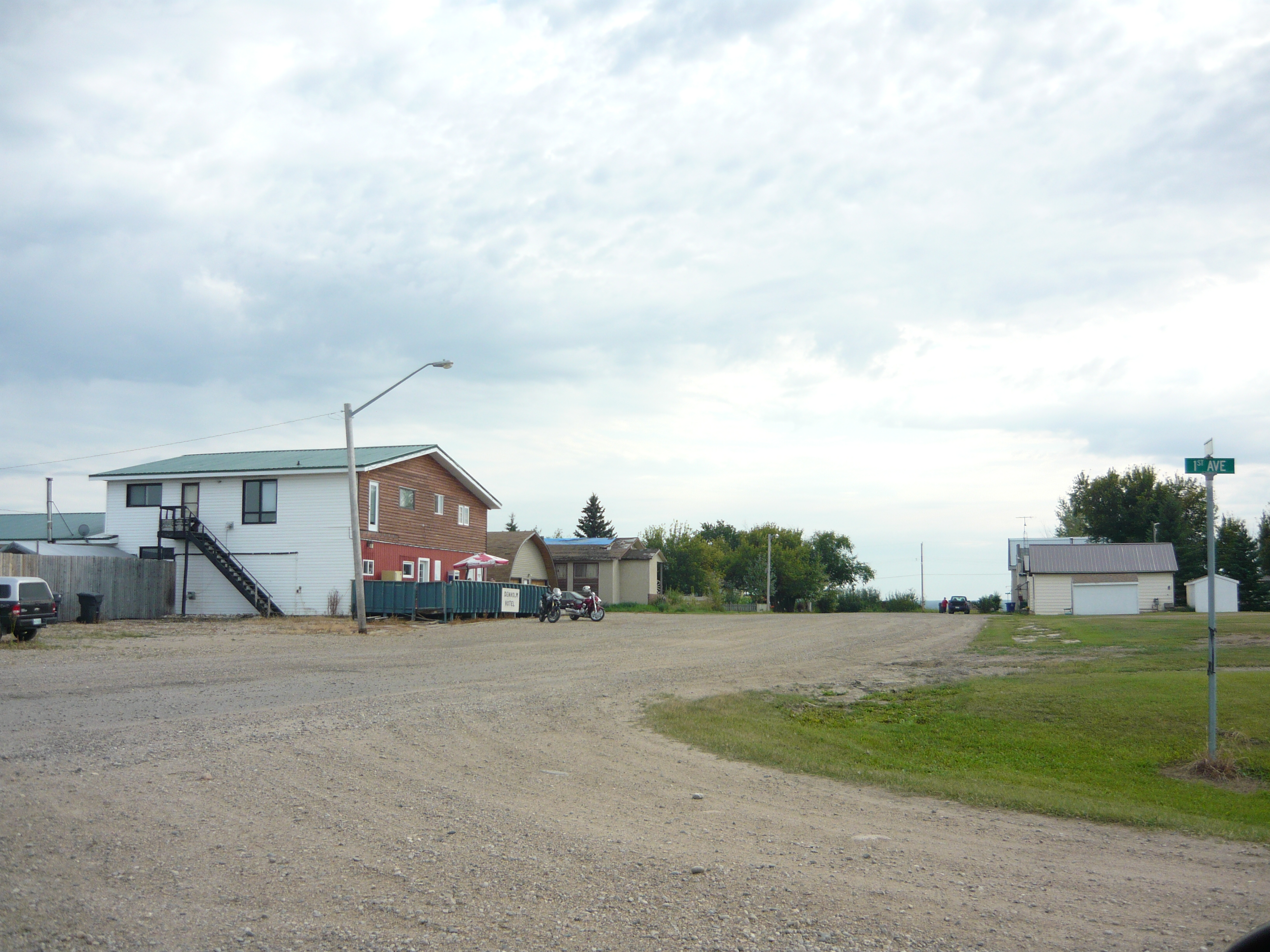
- Main Street Denholm

- Location of Denholm in Saskatchewan Denholm (Canada)
- Coordinates: 52.657°N 108.011°W
- Country: Canada
- Province: Saskatchewan
- Region: Central
- Census division: 16
- Rural Municipality: Mayfield No. 406

Government
  - Type: Municipal
  - Governing body: Denholm Village Council
  - Mayor: Donna Oborowsky
  - Administrator: R. Denise Porter
  - MLA: Randy Weekes
  - MP: Rosemarie Falk

Area
  - Total: 0.33 km^{2} (0.13 sq mi)

Population (2016)
  - Total: 88
  - Density: 269.6/km^{2} (698/sq mi)
- Time zone: UTC-6 (CST)
- Postal code: S0M 0R0
- Area code: 306
- Highways: Highway 687

Denholm (2016 population: 88) is a village in the Canadian province of Saskatchewan within the Rural Municipality of Mayfield No. 406 and Census Division No. 16.

== History ==
Denholm incorporated as a village on June 25, 1912.

== Demographics ==
Population history (1981–2016)
Year	Pop.	±%
1981	95	—
1986	102	+7.4%
1991	85	−16.7%
1996	63	−25.9%
2001	79	+25.4%
2006	61	−22.8%
2011	76	+24.6%
2016	88	+15.8%
Source: Statistics Canada via Saskatchewan Bureau of Statistics

In the 2021 Census of Population conducted by Statistics Canada, Denholm had a population of 75 living in 31 of its 35 total private dwellings, a change of −14.8% from its 2016 population of 88. With a land area of 0.35 km^{2} (0.14 sq mi), it had a population density of 214.3/km^{2} (555.0/sq mi) in 2021.

In the 2016 Census of Population, the Village of Denholm recorded a population of 88 living in 34 of its 36 total private dwellings, a 13.6% change from its 2011 population of 76. With a land area of 0.33 km^{2} (0.13 sq mi), it had a population density of 266.7/km^{2} (690.7/sq mi) in 2016.

== See also ==
- List of communities in Saskatchewan
- List of villages in Saskatchewan
