= Sonningdale =

Community in Saskatchewan, Canada

- Hamlet
- Location within Saskatchewan Location within Canada
- Coordinates: 52°23′0″N 107°41′2″W
- Country: Canada
- Province: Saskatchewan
- Census division: 12
- Rural municipality (RM): Eagle Creek No. 376
- Time zone: CST
- Area code: 306
- Highways: Highway 376

Sonningdale is a hamlet in Rural Municipality of Eagle Creek No. 376, Saskatchewan, Canada. The hamlet is located on Highway 376 about 90 kilometres (56 mi) northwest of Saskatoon and 84 kilometres (52 mi) southeast of North Battleford. It had a population of less than 50 people as of January 2010.

Sonningdale has a church, post office, community complex, seniors centre, a library, and a firehall. The two-story school had an enrollment of 33 in 2005, and was closed in June 2006.

== See also ==
- List of communities in Saskatchewan
