= Rural Municipality of Douglas No. 436 =

Rural municipality in Saskatchewan, Canada

Douglas No. 436
- Rural municipality
- Rural Municipality of Douglas No. 436
- Location of the RM of Douglas No. 436 in Saskatchewan
- Coordinates: 52.738°N 107.667°W
- Country: Canada
- Province: Saskatchewan
- Census division: 16
- SARM division: 6
- Formed: December 13, 1909

Government
  - Reeve: Nick Partyka
  - Governing body: RM of Douglas No. 436 Council
  - Administrator: Darrin Beaudoin
  - Office location: Speers

Area (2016)
  - Land: 820.37 km^{2} (316.75 sq mi)

Population (2016)
  - Total: 350
  - Density: 0.4/km^{2} (1.0/sq mi)
- Time zone: CST
  - Summer (DST): CST
- Area codes: 306 and 639

The Rural Municipality of Douglas No. 436 (2016 population: 350) is a rural municipality (RM) in the Canadian province of Saskatchewan within Census Division No. 16 and SARM Division No. 6.

== History ==
The RM of Douglas No. 436 incorporated as a rural municipality on December 13, 1909.

== Geography ==
=== Communities and localities ===
The following urban municipalities are surrounded by the RM.

Villages

- Speers
- Richard

The following unincorporated communities are within the RM.

Localities

- Alticane
- Keatley
- Lilac

== Demographics ==
Population history (1981–2016)
Year	Pop.	±%
1981	653	—
1986	590	−9.6%
1991	521	−11.7%
1996	478	−8.3%
2001	425	−11.1%
2006	383	−9.9%
2011	331	−13.6%
2016	350	+5.7%
Source: Statistics Canada via Saskatchewan Bureau of Statistics

In the 2021 Census of Population conducted by Statistics Canada, the RM of Douglas No. 436 had a population of 342 living in 130 of its 173 total private dwellings, a change of −2.3% from its 2016 population of 350. With a land area of 814.37 km^{2} (314.43 sq mi), it had a population density of 0.4/km^{2} (1.1/sq mi) in 2021.

In the 2016 Census of Population, the RM of Douglas No. 436 recorded a population of 350 living in 152 of its 173 total private dwellings, a 5.7% change from its 2011 population of 331. With a land area of 820.37 km^{2} (316.75 sq mi), it had a population density of 0.4/km^{2} (1.1/sq mi) in 2016.

== Attractions ==
- Crooked Trees

== Government ==
The RM of Douglas No. 436 is governed by an elected municipal council and an appointed administrator that meets on the second Wednesday of every month. The reeve of the RM is Nick Partyka while its administrator is Charles W. Linnell. The RM's office is located in Speers.

== Transportation ==
- Saskatchewan Highway 40
- Saskatchewan Highway 376
- Canadian Pacific Railway (abandoned)

== See also ==
- List of rural municipalities in Saskatchewan
