= Speers, Saskatchewan =

Village in Saskatchewan, Canada

Speers
- Village
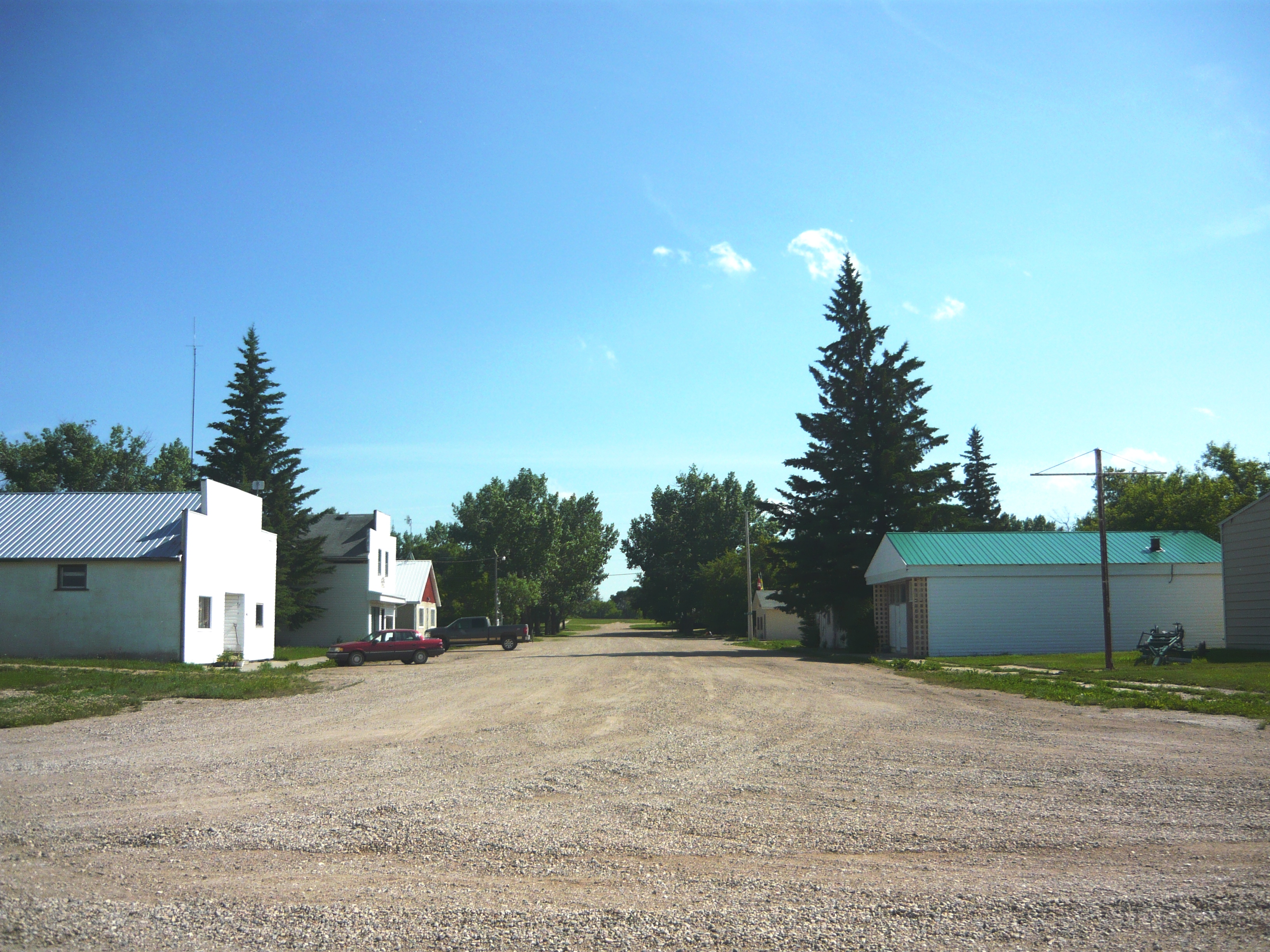
- Main Street, 2011

- Location within Saskatchewan Location within Canada
- Coordinates: 52.423505°N 107.332959°W
- Country: Canada
- Province: Saskatchewan
- Region: West-Central
- Census division: 16
- Rural municipality: Douglas No. 436
- Established: 1913
- Incorporated (Village): 1915

Government
  - Governing body: Speers Village Council
  - Mayor: Kenneth Rebeyka
  - Administrator: Dean Nicholson
  - MP, Carlton Trail—Eagle Creek: Kelly Block (2021)
  - MLA, Biggar-Sask Valley: Randy Weekes (2020)

Area
  - Total: 0.68 km^{2} (0.26 sq mi)

Population (2021)
  - Total: 72
  - Density: 105.9/km^{2} (274/sq mi)
- Time zone: CST
- Postal code: S0M 2V0
- Area code: 306
- Highways: Highway 40
- Railways: Canadian National Railway

Speers (2021 population: 72) is a village in the Canadian province of Saskatchewan within the Rural Municipality of Douglas No. 436 and Census Division No. 16. The village is located approximately 50 kilometres (31 mi) southeast of the city of North Battleford on Highway 40.

The community is named for Charles Wesley Speers, the colonization agent for Western Canada, who came from Eastern Canada to settle at Griswold, Manitoba, in 1884.

== History ==
Speers incorporated as a village on December 24, 1915.

== Demographics ==
Population history (1981–2021)
Year	Pop.	±%
1981	114	—
1986	110	−3.5%
1991	91	−17.3%
1996	84	−7.7%
2001	71	−15.5%
2006	74	+4.2%
2011	65	−12.2%
2016	60	−7.7%
2021	72	+20.0%
Source: Statistics Canada via Saskatchewan Bureau of Statistics

In the 2021 Census of Population conducted by Statistics Canada, Speers had a population of 72 living in 30 of its 37 total private dwellings, a change of 20% from its 2016 population of 60. With a land area of 0.68 km^{2} (0.26 sq mi), it had a population density of 105.9/km^{2} (274.2/sq mi) in 2021.

In the 2016 Census of Population, the Village of Speers recorded a population of 60 living in 26 of its 34 total private dwellings, a −8.3% change from its 2011 population of 65. With a land area of 0.69 km^{2} (0.27 sq mi), it had a population density of 87.0/km^{2} (225.2/sq mi) in 2016.

== See also ==
- List of communities in Saskatchewan
- List of villages in Saskatchewan
