= Spruce Bay =

Community in Saskatchewan, Canada

Coordinates: 53°12′27″N 107°41′29″W

Spruce Bay is a hamlet in the Canadian province of Saskatchewan. It is located on the north-western shore of Meeting Lake, adjacent to Meeting Lake Regional Park. It lies within the Rural Municipality of Spiritwood No. 496.

== Demographics ==
In the 2021 Census of Population conducted by Statistics Canada, Spruce Bay had a population of 15 living in 7 of its 33 total private dwellings, a change of -25% from its 2016 population of 20. With a land area of 0.14 km^{2} (0.054 sq mi), it had a population density of 107.1/km^{2} (277.5/sq mi) in 2021.

== See also ==
- List of hamlets in Saskatchewan
- List of communities in Saskatchewan
