= Richard, Saskatchewan =

Village in Saskatchewan, Canada

Richard
- Village
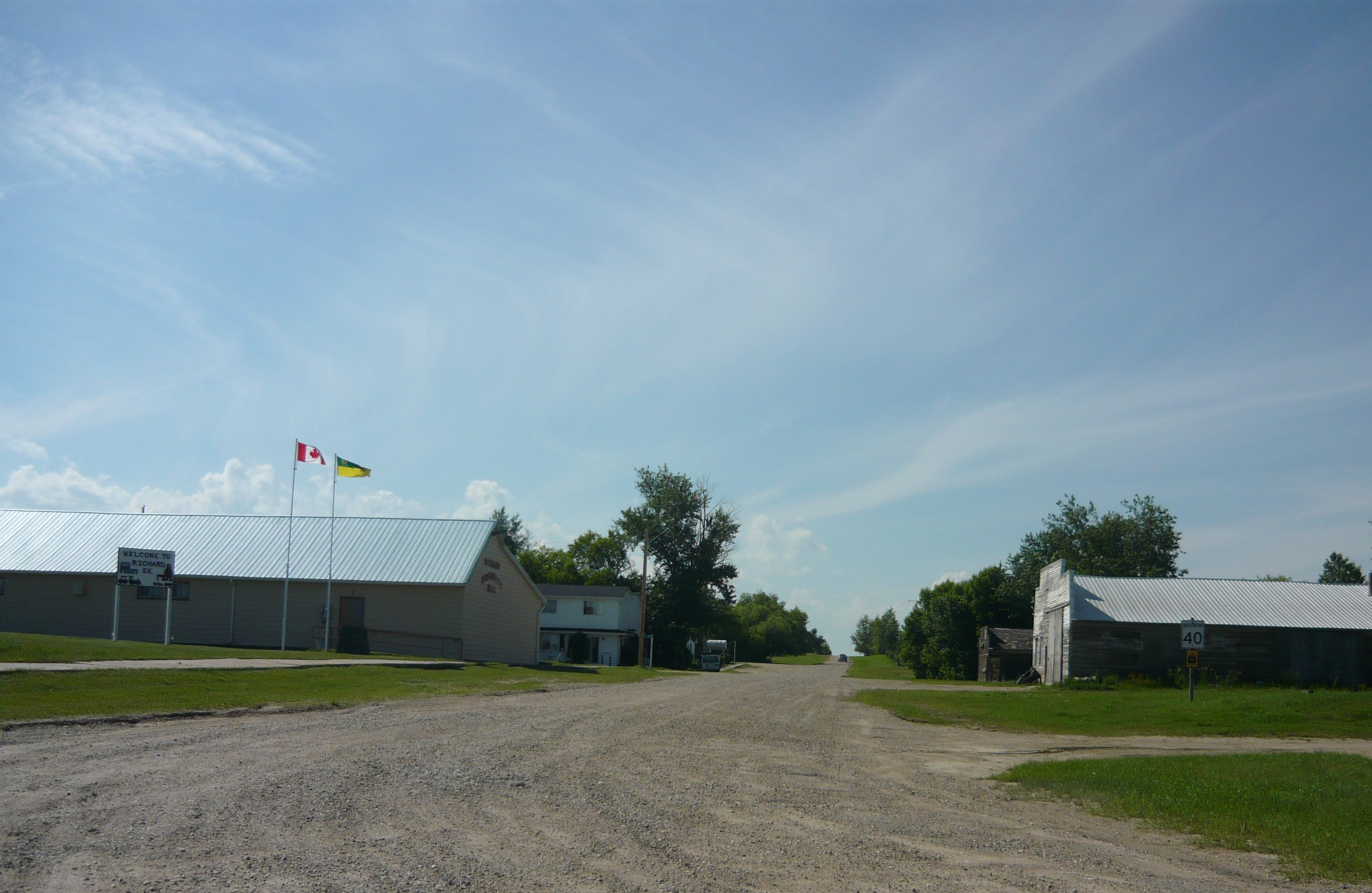
- Main Street

- Location of Richard Richard (Canada)
- Coordinates: 52°42′N 107°42′W
- Country: Canada
- Province: Saskatchewan
- Rural municipality: Douglas No. 436
- Post Office Established: 1904
- Incorporated (Village): 1916

Population (2006)
  - Total: 25
- Time zone: CST
- Postal code: S0M 2P0
- Area code: 306

Richard (2016 population: 20) is a village in the Canadian province of Saskatchewan within the Rural Municipality of Douglas No. 436 and Census Division No. 16. It is approximately 48 kilometres (30 mi) east of the city of North Battleford.

== History ==
Richard was founded in 1900 by Emile Richard. He was born in 1860, and died in Montreal, Quebec, in 1942. He moved out of Richard when the Richard House "Acadia" burnt down in 1935.

The Richard post office was established in 1904. Richard incorporated as a village on October 11, 1916.

At one time, Richard consisted of the following buildings: original Richard Ranch Building (1901), Patrick Labreque's store (later changed to Richard Trading post), Emile Richard's Barn, a grain elevator (opened in 1915), H. G. Grahams post office, livery barn, Richard Hotel, Emile Richard's brick home and garage (1917), CO-OP store (later Symonds Hardware), Mrs. Florence's Gift Shoppe, Richard Bank, Ernest McEwen home, H.P Voke house, Kokesh and Poeppings Garage, Richard C.N.R. Station, Skwara's Store, Town Hall, corner store, Colin Campbell's Store, café, and Haight House.

The only one of these buildings standing today is the post office. Over the years, many of these buildings have been purchased and moved out of town.

== Demographics ==
Population history (1981–2016)
Year	Pop.	±%
1981	23	—
1986	26	+13.0%
1991	29	+11.5%
1996	17	−41.4%
2001	20	+17.6%
2006	25	+25.0%
2011	30	+20.0%
2016	20	−33.3%
Source: Statistics Canada via Saskatchewan Bureau of Statistics

In the 2021 Census of Population conducted by Statistics Canada, Richard had a population of 25 living in 10 of its 10 total private dwellings, a change of 25% from its 2016 population of 20. With a land area of 0.72 km^{2} (0.28 sq mi), it had a population density of 34.7/km^{2} (89.9/sq mi) in 2021.

In the 2016 Census of Population, the Village of Richard recorded a population of 20 living in 8 of its 10 total private dwellings, a −50% change from its 2011 population of 30. With a land area of 0.73 km^{2} (0.28 sq mi), it had a population density of 27.4/km^{2} (71.0/sq mi) in 2016.

== Government ==
The former mayor was Her Worship Merilyn Wawryk, before she died on April 11, 2017. She was succeeded in office by His Worship Dennis Wawryk, her son. The village Councillors are Veronica Tricker and Leon Fendelet. Stephanie Reiter is the village Administrator.

== See also ==
- List of communities in Saskatchewan
- List of villages in Saskatchewan
