= Redfield, Saskatchewan =

Redfield
- Hamlet
- Location within Saskatchewan Location within Canada
- Coordinates: 52°57′0″N 107°45′2″W
- Country: Canada
- Province: Saskatchewan
- Census division: 16
- Rural Municipality: Round Hill No. 467
- Time zone: CST
- Area code: 306
- Highways: Hwy 324

Redfield is a hamlet in Rural Municipality of Round Hill No. 467, Saskatchewan, Canada. The hamlet is located on Highway 324 about 140 km (87 mi) northwest of Saskatoon and 57 km (35 mi) northeast of North Battleford.

== See also ==
- List of communities in Saskatchewan
