= Rabbit Lake, Saskatchewan =

Special service area in Saskatchewan, Canada

Rabbit Lake
- Special service area
- Location within Saskatchewan Location within Canada
- Coordinates: 53.1411°N 107.767851°W
- Country: Canada
- Province: Saskatchewan
- Region: West-central
- Census division: 6
- Rural municipality: Round Hill No. 467
- Village: April 13, 1928
- Dissolved: October 30, 2015

Government
  - Governing body: Rabbit Lake Village Council

Area
  - Total: 0.92 km^{2} (0.36 sq mi)

Population (2006)
  - Total: 113
  - Density: 123.4/km^{2} (320/sq mi)
  - Dwellings: 61
- Time zone: CST
- Postal code: S0M 2L0
- Area code: 306
- Highways: Highway 378
- Railways: Canadian Pacific Railway

Rabbit Lake is a special service area within the Rural Municipality of Round Hill No. 467 in Saskatchewan, Canada. It dissolved from village status on October 30, 2015. It originally incorporated as a village on April 13, 1928. The population was 113 at the 2006 Canada Census a substantial 29.9% increase from the 2001 Canada Census.

== Demographics ==
In 2006, Rabbit Lake had a population of 113 living in 61 dwellings, a 29.9% increase from 2001. The village had a land area of 0.92 km^{2} (0.36 sq mi) and a population density of 123.4/km^{2} (320/sq mi).

== See also ==
- List of communities in Saskatchewan
