= Spiritwood =

Town in Saskatchewan, Canada

- Town
- Location of Spiritwood in Saskatchewan Spiritwood (Canada)
- Coordinates: 53°21′55″N 107°31′07″W
- Country: Canada
- Province: Saskatchewan
- Rural municipality: Spiritwood No. 496

Government
  - Mayor: Gary von Holwede
  - MLA Rosthern-Shellbrook: Scott Moe
  - MP Desnethé—Missinippi—Churchill River: Georgina Jolibois

Area
  - Total: 2.95 km^{2} (1.14 sq mi)

Population (2011)
  - Total: 916
  - Density: 310/km^{2} (800/sq mi)
- Time zone: UTC−06:00 (CST)
  - Summer (DST): UTC−05:00 (DST)
- Postal code: S0J 2M0
- Highways: Hwy 3, Hwy 24, Hwy 378
- Website: "Town of Spiritwood Website".

Spiritwood is a town in the boreal forest of central Saskatchewan, Canada, with a population of approximately 1,000. Its location is 125 kilometres (78 mi) west of Prince Albert and about 110 kilometres (68 mi) northeast of North Battleford at the junction of Highway 3, Highway 24, and Highway 378. As the largest community in the region, the community functions as the major supply, service, and administrative headquarters for the trading area population which includes several First Nation reserves including Witchekan Lake, Big River, and Pelican Lake.

== History ==
The district began to be settled around 1911–12; however, growth in the area was slow until the coming of the railway in the late 1920s. The first settlers primarily engaged in ranching. The Spiritwood post office, which had been established in 1923, was named after Spiritwood Lake, North Dakota, the hometown of the first postmaster, Rupert J. Dumond. After the railway arrived, settlers of diverse origins poured into the district and many businesses were established. On October 1, 1935, Spiritwood was incorporated as a village and, by September 1, 1965, the community had grown large enough to attain town status.

Spiritwood was the scene of the two deaths of RCMP officers in 2006, where after a 12-day manhunt, the suspect surrendered without incident.

== Demographics ==
In the 2021 Census of Population conducted by Statistics Canada, Spiritwood had a population of 966 living in 395 of its 422 total private dwellings, a change of 5.8% from its 2016 population of 913. With a land area of 2.91 km^{2} (1.12 sq mi), it had a population density of 332.0/km^{2} (859.8/sq mi) in 2021.

Canada census – Spiritwood community profile

	2011
Population	916 (+0.5% from 2006)
Land area	2.95 km^{2} (1.14 sq mi)
Population density	310.0/km^{2} (803/sq mi)
Median age	44.9 (M: 43.1, F: 46.2)
Private dwellings	425 (total)
Median household income

References: 2011

== Economy ==
Mixed farming predominates and consists primarily of grain production. A Spiritwood company with global connections that focuses on pig genetics, producing breeding stock and commercial swine, has roughly 50 employees. There is some forestry in the region north of Spiritwood.

== Attractions ==
The town has a range of recreational facilities.

- Once hometown of the annual Silverbuckle Rodeo, a mid-summer attraction for many years, the grandstands are no more.
- "SpiritFest" is held annually in August.
- Spiritwood Museum is open seasonally throughout the summer months. The museum showcases the community's history, including an exhibition of antique farm tractors all freshly restored and in running condition.
- Campground facilities available with 12 sites.

Spiritwood is located in the centre of an area that features six golf courses (three grass greens and three sand greens), six regional parks and 35 lakes, all within a 60-minute drive. The lakes have fishing for perch, walleye, pike, and trout. Its close proximity to lakes and parks with camping, boating, fishing, golfing, hunting, cross country skiing, snowmobiling, and hiking.

== Infrastructure ==
There is sewer/water capacity for 1,500 residents to allow for 50% community growth. Free Wi-Fi, cellular service, and cable television are available.

=== Transportation ===
There is no bus service available to Spiritwood, so that with the railway gone and grain elevators closed, all bulk commodities including fertilizers, fuel, grain and livestock are transported by truck. Highways 3, 24, and 378 provide access.

Spiritwood Airport (TC LID: CKH7), now defunct, was an uncontrolled public grass strip operated by Town of Spiritwood.

Leoville Airport (TC LID CJT9), is available 32 km north of Spiritwood, located 2 NM (3.7 km // 2.3 mi) west of Leoville, Saskatchewan. This is a public airport operated by the Village of Leoville with two runways. (Runway Direction 12/30; Length 2,400 ft // 732 m; Surface GRAVEL. Runway Direction 16/34; Length 3,400 ft // 1,036 m; Surface TREATED GRAVEL).

=== Health Care ===
Northern Lakes Health Committee (NLHC), a volunteer group, was set up at Spiritwood in May 2010 with directors selected to represent each of the surrounding communities, organizing fundraising events to support a physician recruitment initiative through a subcommittee.

Since 2006, Spiritwood & District Health Complex was closed "temporarily", leaving the community at large without acute care facilities. Completed in the fall of 2001, this modern $3.6 million facility encompasses approximately 8,000 square feet (740 m^{2}) of new construction and 4,400 square feet (410 m^{2}) of renovated space which is linked to the former Spiritwood Hospital and Idylwild Lodge to serve as one integrated facility.

== See also ==
- List of towns in Saskatchewan
- List of francophone communities in Saskatchewan
