= Asquith, Saskatchewan =

Town in Saskatchewan, Canada

Town of Asquith
- Town
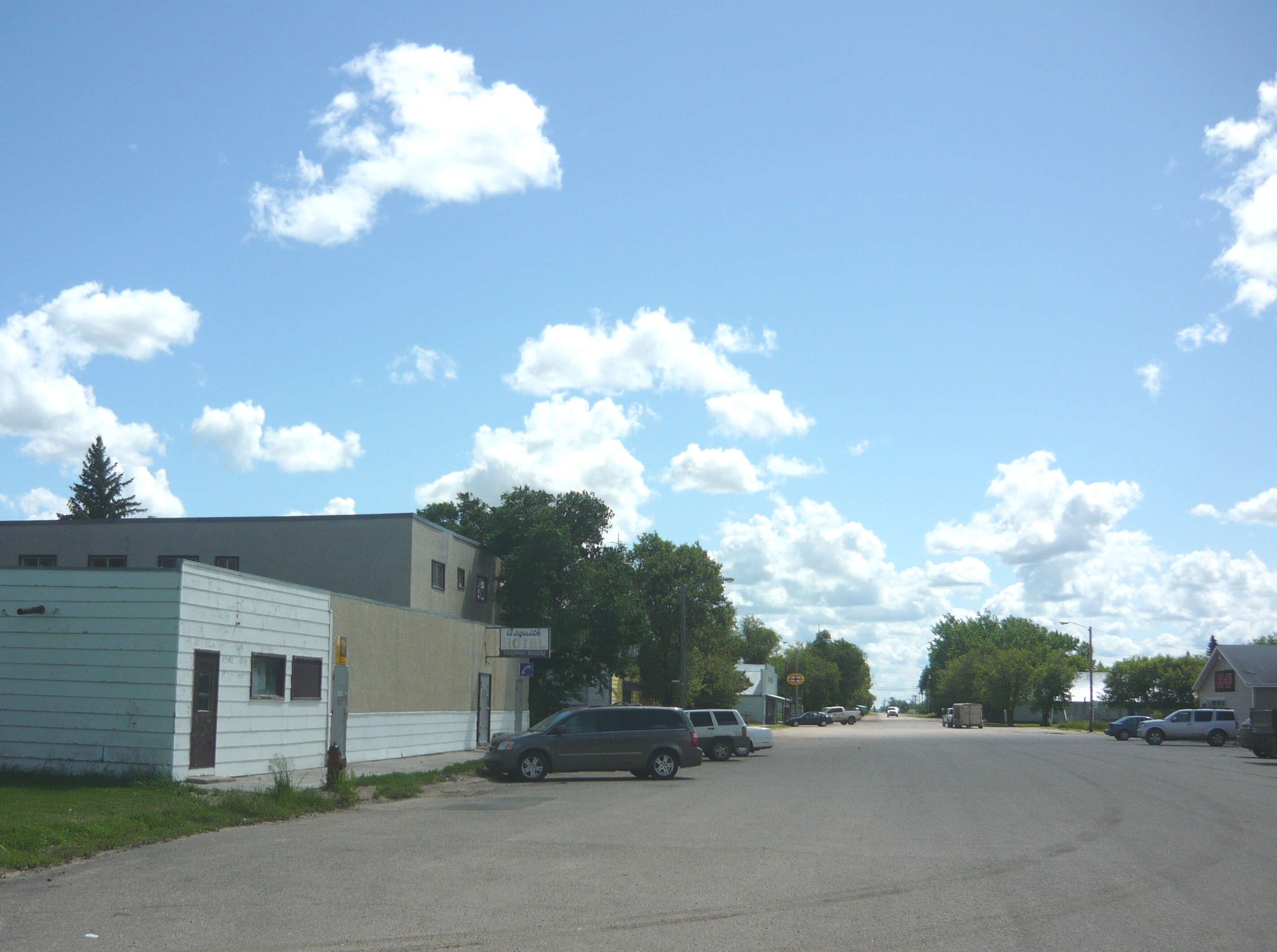
- Asquith's Main Street
- Motto: Centre of the British Empire
- Location of Asquith in Saskatchewan Town of Asquith (Canada)
- Coordinates: 52.135°N 107.228°W
- Country: Canada
- Province: Saskatchewan
- Census division: 12
- Founded: 1903
- Incorporated (Village): 1907
- Incorporated (Town): 1908

Government
  - Mayor: Jackie Stobbe
  - Town Manager: Kaila Montgomerie
  - Governing body: Asquith Town Council

Area
  - Land: 1.37 km^{2} (0.53 sq mi)

Population (2021)
  - Total: 624
  - Density: 456/km^{2} (1,180/sq mi)
- Time zone: CST
- Postal code: S0K 0J0
- Area code: 306
- Highways: Highway 14
- Website: townofasquith.com

Asquith is a town in south-central Saskatchewan, Canada, approximately 55 kilometres (34 mi) west of Saskatoon. It became a village in December 1907. According to the 2021 Canadian census, its population is 624. Asquith has a 543-hectare conservation area. The site was largely the original lands settled by Ontario pioneers Andrew and Jennet Mather.

== Geography ==
Asquith is located approximately 55 kilometres (34 mi) away from Saskatoon and has a 543-hectare conservation area.

== History ==
Asquith was established in the early 1900s on land originally settled by Ontario pioneers Andrew and Jennet Mather. The Mathers were among the town's founding families and operated a general store, which temporarily served as a gathering place for church services before a dedicated building was constructed. The town quickly grew around their homestead, forming a close-knit community with deep roots in family and faith.

In 1908, the Asquith Presbyterian Church was built with support from the Mather and Hastings families, among others. The building was soon shared with the local Methodist congregation and later became part of the United Church of Canada following the 1925 church union. Generations of local families have remained active in the church, which has long served as a hub of community life. Since 1985, the church has also been shared with St. Theresa's Roman Catholic parish, continuing Asquith's tradition of cooperation and community spirit.

== Demographics ==
Based on the 2021 Census of Population conducted by Statistics Canada, Asquith had a population of 624 living in 254 of its 277 total private dwellings, a change of −2.3% from its 2016 population of 639. With a land area of 1.37 km^{2} (0.53 sq mi), it had a population density of 455.5/km^{2} (1,179.7/sq mi) in 2021.

According to the census, the population was composed of 335 males (53.6%) and 290 females (46.4%). In terms of age distribution, 26.2% of residents were children, under the age of 18, 59.5% were working age, between ages 18 and 64, and 14.3% were [seniors aged 65 and over.

The vast majority of residents, 96.6%, were born in Canada, while 3.4% were born in Europe. English was the predominant mother tongue, spoken by 91.9% of the population. Other reported first languages included French (0.8%), other languages (4.8%), and multiple languages (2.4%).

As of 2024, the estimated population of Asquith had risen to 655, representing a modest annual growth rate of 0.38% between 2022 and 2024. This brought the updated population density to approximately 478.7/km², based on a land area of 1.37 km². These estimates differ slightly from official census figures, as they are adjusted for underenumeration.

Canada census – Asquith community profile

	2021	2016	2011
Population	624 (-2.3% from 2016)	639 (6.0% from 2011)	603 (4.7%% from 2006)
Land area	1.37 km^{2} (0.53 sq mi)	1.42 km^{2} (0.55 sq mi)	1.23 km^{2} (0.47 sq mi)
Population density	456/km^{2} (1,180/sq mi)	449.6/km^{2} (1,164/sq mi)	491.4/km^{2} (1,273/sq mi)
Median age	36.8 (M: 36.8, F: 36.8)
Private dwellings	277 (total) 254 (occupied)	261 (total)	248 (total)
Median household income	$77,000

References: 2021 2016 2011

Historical census populations – Asquith, Saskatchewan

Year	Pop.	±%
1911	199	—
1921	311	+56.3%
1931	275	−11.6%
1941	214	−22.2%
1951	255	+19.2%
1956	288	+12.9%
1961	324	+12.5%

Year	Pop.	±%
1966	304	−6.2%
1971	355	+16.8%
1976	416	+17.2%
1981	507	+21.9%
1986	557	+9.9%
1991	525	−5.7%
1996	533	+1.5%

Year	Pop.	±%
2001	574	+7.7%
2006	576	+0.3%
2011	603	+4.7%
2016	639	+6.0%
2021	624	−2.3%

Source: Statistics Canada

== See also ==
- List of communities in Saskatchewan
- List of towns in Saskatchewan
