= Mayfair, Saskatchewan =

Community in Saskatchewan, Canada

Coordinates: 52°58′56″N 107°35′55″W

Mayfair is an organized hamlet in the Canadian province of Saskatchewan. Located within the Rural Municipality of Meeting Lake No. 466, it can be accessed via Highway 324.

== Demographics ==
In the 2021 Census of Population conducted by Statistics Canada, Mayfair had a population of 20 living in 13 of its 19 total private dwellings, a change of -33.3% from its 2016 population of 30. With a land area of 0.09 km^{2} (0.035 sq mi), it had a population density of 222.2/km^{2} (575.6/sq mi) in 2021.
