= Saskatchewan Highway 374 =

Provincial highway in Saskatchewan, Canada

Highway 374

Route information
- Maintained by Ministry of Highways and Infrastructure
- Length: 50.0 km (31.1 mi)

Major junctions
- West end: Highway 21 / Highway 771 near Tramping Lake
- North end: Highway 14 near Scott

Location
- Country: Canada
- Province: Saskatchewan
- Rural municipalities: Mariposa, Tramping Lake

Highway system
- Provincial highways in Saskatchewan
| ← Highway 373 | → Highway 375 |

Highway 374 is a provincial highway in the Canadian province of Saskatchewan. It runs from Highway 21 / Highway 771 near Tramping Lake to Highway 14 near Scott. It is about 50 kilometres (31 mi) long.

The highway travels east for 16 kilometres (9.9 mi) past the village of Tramping Lake before it turns north, passing the town of Scott before terminating at Highway 14.

== Route description ==
Hwy 374 begins along the border between the Rural Municipalities of Mariposa No. 350 and Tramping Lake No. 380 at junction with Hwy 21 / Hwy 771. It heads east along the border, concurrent (overlapped) with eastbound Hwy 771 as a two-lane gravel road through rural farmland for a few kilometres to travel along the north side of the village of Tramping Lake (located in Mariposa No. 350), where the pair have an intersection with the north end of Hwy 659 and cross a former railway line (Canadian Pacific Railway's Redford subdivision). Shorty thereafter, Hwy 771 splits off and heads east to cross Tramping Lake while Hwy 374 curves northward into the RM Of Tramping Lake No. 380, running parallel to the western coastline of the lake for several kilometres as it travels through rural areas, passing by the hamlet of Revenue and the Scott Hutterite Colony as it traverses a switchback before crossing a causeway over Eagle Creek, where the gravel transitions to asphalt as the highway enters the town of Scott. After crossing Canadian National Railway's Wainwright subdivision, the highway travels through the western part of town before leaving Scott and coming to an end shortly thereafter at an intersection with Hwy 14, with the road continuing north for a short distance as Range Road 3204.

== Major intersections ==
| Rural municipality | Location | km | mi | Destinations | Notes |
|---|---|---|---|---|---|
| Mariposa No. 350 - Tramping Lake No. 380 boundary | | 0.0 | 0.0 | Highway 21 / Highway 771 west – Kerrobert, Unity | Western terminus; western end of Hwy 771 concurrency; road continues west as Township Road 370 |
| Mariposa No. 350 - Tramping Lake No. 380 boundary | Tramping Lake | 13.0 | 8.1 | Highway 659 south – Tramping Lake, Broadacres | Northern terminus of Hwy 659 |
| Mariposa No. 350 - Tramping Lake No. 380 boundary | | 16.0– 16.4 | 9.9– 10.2 | Highway 771 east – Leipzig, Handel | Eastern end of Hwy 771 concurrency; Hwy 374 changes cardinal directions from east-west to north-south |
| Tramping Lake No. 380 | Revenue | 25.6 | 15.9 | Main Street – Revenue | |
| Tramping Lake No. 380 | | 43.6 | 27.1 | Causeway across Eagle Creek; southern end of paved section | |
| Tramping Lake No. 380 | Scott | 45.6 | 28.3 | 2nd Avenue – Scott | |
| Tramping Lake No. 380 | | 50.0 | 31.1 | Highway 14 – Unity, Wilkie | Northern terminus; road continues north as Range Road 3204 |
1.000 mi = 1.609 km; 1.000 km = 0.621 mi: Concurrency terminus

== See also ==
- Transportation in Saskatchewan
- Roads in Saskatchewan
