= Tramping Lake, Saskatchewan =

Village in Saskatchewan, Canada

Tramping Lake
- Village
- Location of Tramping Lake in Saskatchewan Tramping Lake (Canada)
- Coordinates: 52.135°N 108.949°W
- Country: Canada
- Province: Saskatchewan
- Region: Saskatchewan
- Census division: 13
- Rural Municipality: Mariposa
- Post office Founded: N/A
- Incorporated (Village): N/A
- Incorporated (Town): N/A

Government
  - Mayor: Arnold Simon
  - Administrator: Aileen Garrett
  - Governing body: Tramping Lake Village Council

Area
  - Total: 1.39 km^{2} (0.54 sq mi)

Population (2016)
  - Total: 60
  - Density: 43.2/km^{2} (112/sq mi)
- Time zone: CST
- Postal code: S0K 4H0
- Area code: 306
- Highways: Highway 374 / Highway 659 / Highway 771
- Waterways: Tramping Lake

Tramping Lake (2016 population: 60) is a village in the Canadian province of Saskatchewan within the Rural Municipality of Mariposa No. 350 and Census Division No. 13. The village gets its name from nearby Tramping Lake, which is a lake along the course of Eagle Creek.

== History ==
Tramping Lake incorporated as a village on April 10, 1917.

== Demographics ==
Population history (1981–2016)
Year	Pop.	±%
1981	178	—
1986	182	+2.2%
1991	143	−21.4%
1996	118	−17.5%
2001	85	−28.0%
2006	60	−29.4%
2011	55	−8.3%
2016	60	+9.1%
Source: Statistics Canada via Saskatchewan Bureau of Statistics

In the 2021 Census of Population conducted by Statistics Canada, Tramping Lake had a population of 35 living in 17 of its 26 total private dwellings, a change of −41.7% from its 2016 population of 60. With a land area of 1.27 km^{2} (0.49 sq mi), it had a population density of 27.6/km^{2} (71.4/sq mi) in 2021.

In the 2016 Census of Population, the Village of Tramping Lake recorded a population of 60 living in 29 of its 44 total private dwellings, a 8.3% change from its 2011 population of 55. With a land area of 1.39 km^{2} (0.54 sq mi), it had a population density of 43.2/km^{2} (111.8/sq mi) in 2016.

== See also ==
- List of communities in Saskatchewan
- List of villages in Saskatchewan
