= Alkali =

Basic, ionic salt of an alkali metal

In chemistry, an alkali (/ˈælkəlaɪ/) or base is a hydroxide of any of either the alkali metal which are Group I s-block elements, or the alkaline earth metal which are Group II s-block. Alkali can also be defined as a base that dissolves in water. A solution of a soluble base has a pH greater than 7.0. The adjectives alkaline and, less often, alkalescent are commonly used in English as a synonyms for basic, especially for bases soluble in water. This broad use of the term is likely to have come about because alkalis were the first bases known to obey the Arrhenius definition of a base, and they are still among the most common bases.

== Etymology ==
The word alkali is derived from Arabic القالِي al-qalīy meaning 'the calcined ashes', that is, ashes of burnt Salicornia, a type of saltwort that is the original source of alkaline substances. A water-extract of burned plant ashes, called potash and composed mostly of potassium carbonate, was mildly basic. After heating this substance with calcium hydroxide (slaked lime), a far more strongly basic substance known as caustic potash (potassium hydroxide) was produced. Caustic potash was traditionally used in conjunction with animal fats to produce soft soaps, one of the caustic processes that rendered soaps from fats in the process of saponification, one known since antiquity. Plant potash lent the name to the element potassium, which was first derived from caustic potash, and its chemical symbol K (from the German name Kalium), which ultimately derived from alkali.

== Common properties of alkalis and bases ==
Alkalis are all Arrhenius bases, ones which form hydroxide ions (OH^{−}) when dissolved in water. Common properties of alkaline aqueous solutions include:

- Moderately concentrated solutions (over 10^{−3} M) have a pH of 10 or greater. This means that they will turn phenolphthalein from colorless to pink.
- Concentrated solutions are caustic (causing chemical burns).
- Alkaline solutions are slippery or soapy to the touch, due to the saponification of the fatty substances on the surface of the skin.
- Alkalis are normally water-soluble, although some like barium carbonate are only soluble when reacting with an acidic aqueous solution.

== Difference between alkali and base ==
The terms "base" and "alkali" are often used interchangeably, particularly outside the context of chemistry and chemical engineering.

There are various, more specific definitions for the concept of an alkali. Alkalis are usually defined as a subset of the bases. One of two subsets is commonly chosen.

- A basic salt of an alkali metal or alkaline earth metal (this includes Mg(OH)_{2} (magnesium hydroxide) but excludes NH_{3} (ammonia)).
- Any base that is soluble in water and forms hydroxide ions or the solution of a base in water. (This includes both Mg(OH)_{2} and NH_{3}, which forms NH_{4}OH.)

The second subset of bases is also called an "Arrhenius base".

== Alkali salts ==
Alkali salts are soluble hydroxides of alkali metals and alkaline earth metals, of which common examples are:

- Sodium hydroxide (NaOH) – often called "caustic soda"
- Potassium hydroxide (KOH) – commonly called "caustic potash"
- Lye – generic term for either of two previous salts or their mixture
- Calcium hydroxide (Ca(OH)_{2}) – saturated solution known as "limewater"
- Magnesium hydroxide (Mg(OH)_{2}) – an atypical alkali since it has low solubility in water (although the dissolved portion is considered a strong base due to complete dissociation of its ions)

== Alkaline soil ==
Soils with pH values that are higher than 7.3 are usually defined as being alkaline. These soils can occur naturally due to the presence of alkali salts. Although many plants do prefer slightly basic soil (including vegetables like cabbage and fodder like buffalo grass), most plants prefer mildly acidic soil (with pHs between 6.0 and 6.8), and alkaline soils can cause problems.

== Alkali lakes ==
In alkali lakes (also called soda lakes), evaporation concentrates the naturally occurring carbonate salts, giving rise to an alkalic and often saline lake.

Examples of alkali lakes:

- Alkali Lake, Lake County, Oregon
- Baldwin Lake, San Bernardino County, California
- Bear Lake on the Utah–Idaho border
- Lake Magadi in Kenya
- Lake Turkana in Kenya
- Mono Lake, near Owens Valley in California
- Redberry Lake, Saskatchewan
- Summer Lake, Lake County, Oregon
- Tramping Lake, Saskatchewan

== See also ==
- Alkali manufacture
- Alkali metals
- Alkaline earth metals
- Alkaline magma series
- Base (chemistry)
