= Leney, Saskatchewan =

Coordinates: 52.03339°N 107.5513°W

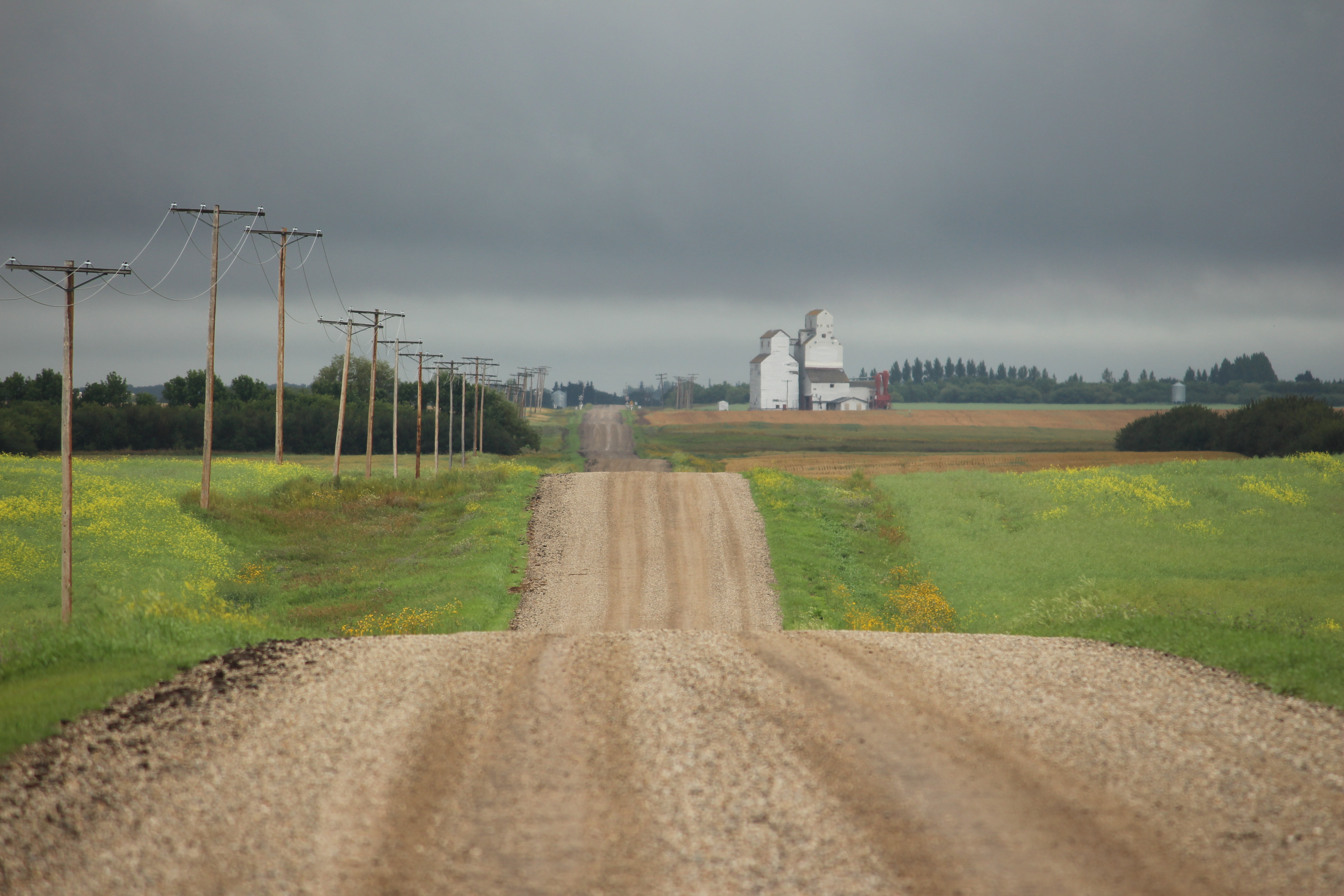
Leney, grain elevators, from Highway 655.

Leney is an unincorporated community in Perdue Rural Municipality No. 346, Saskatchewan, Canada. The community had a population of 30 in 2001. It previously held the status of a village until December 31, 1971. The hamlet is located 68 km west of the City of Saskatoon on highway 655 3 km south the town of Perdue and highway 14 on the Canadian National Railway.

== History ==
Prior to December 31, 1971, Leney was incorporated as a village, and was restructured as a hamlet under the jurisdiction of the Rural municipality of Perdue on that date.

== Climate ==
The Köppen Climate Classification subtype for this climate is "Dfb (Warm Summer Continental Climate).

== See also ==
- List of Grand Trunk Pacific Railway stations
- List of communities in Saskatchewan
