= Eagle Creek (Saskatchewan) =

River in Saskatchewan, Canada

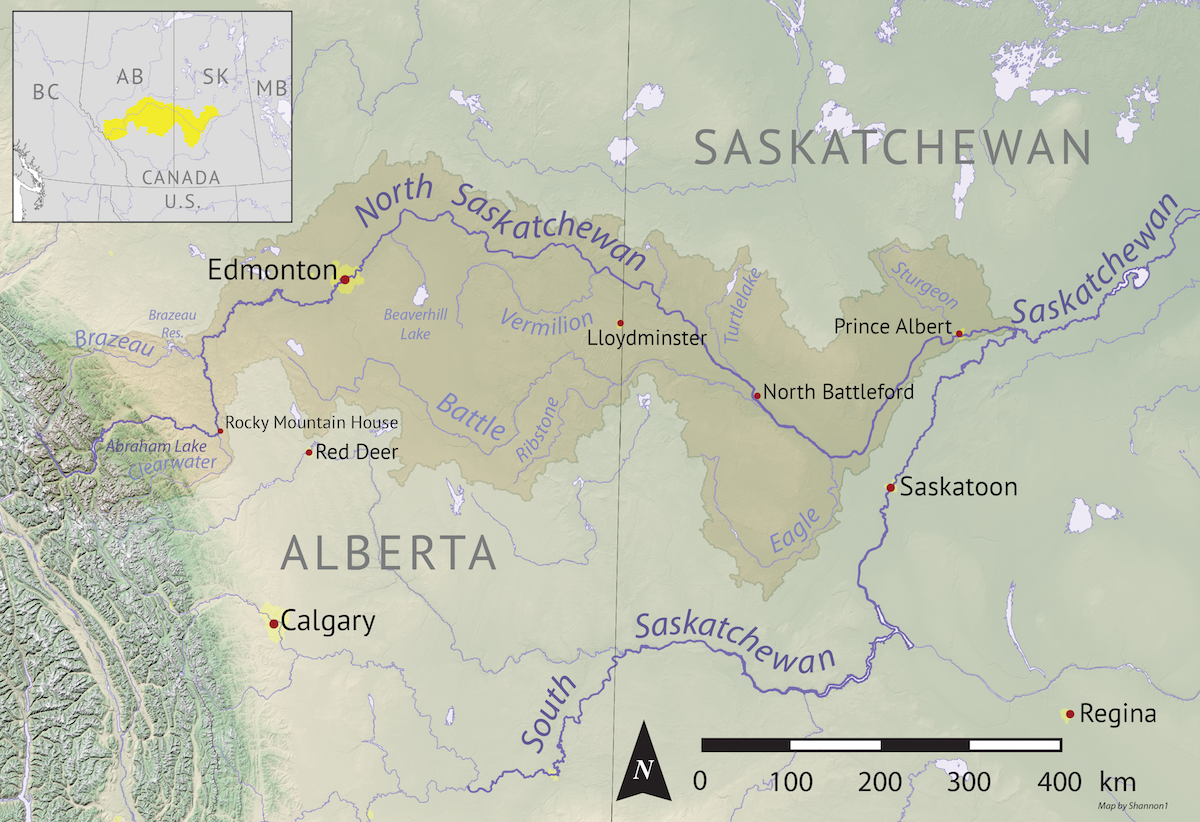
- North Saskatchewan River drainage basin

- Location of the mouth in Saskatchewan Eagle Creek (Saskatchewan) (Canada)

Location
- Country: Canada
- Provinces: Saskatchewan

Physical characteristics
- Source: Eaglehill Lake
  - location: RM of Tramping Lake No. 380
  - coordinates: 52.3502°N 108.9348°W
  - elevation: 635 m (2,083 ft)
- Mouth: North Saskatchewan River
  - location: RM of Eagle Creek No. 376
  - coordinates: 52.3465°N 107.4059°W
  - elevation: 443 m (1,453 ft)
- Length: 189 km (117 mi)
- Discharge
  - average: 1 m^{3} (35 cu ft) /second
  - maximum: 2 m^{3} (71 cu ft) /second

Basin features
- River system: North Saskatchewan River
- Tributaries
  - left: Dry Creek
  - right: Coal Mine Creek

Eagle Creek is a river in the Canadian province of Saskatchewan. The watershed of Eagle Creek is within the semi-arid Palliser's Triangle and is the major drainage system in mid-western Saskatchewan between the South Saskatchewan and North Saskatchewan Rivers. Eagle Creek begins at the eastern end of Eaglehill Lake and travels through a glacier-cut valley in the moist, mixed grasslands ecozone of Canada en route to the North Saskatchewan River. The North Saskatchewan River merges with the South Saskatchewan River farther downstream to become the Saskatchewan River.

There are three communities, one regional park, and several highways along the river's course. The communities include Stranraer, Herschel, and Anglia. Highways 51, 31, 4, and 14 are significant highways that cross the river.

== Description ==
For much of Eagle Creek's course, it follows a meltwater channel that was formed near the end of the last ice age. Both this channel and the North Saskatchewan River meltwater channel to the north were important in draining the land to the west — present-day Alberta. As the glaciers were receding, several large proglacial lakes were formed near Eagle Creek, including Glacial Lake Red Willow to the north-west, Glacial Lake Unity directly north, and to the east, Glacial Lake Saskatchewan. These lakes and meltwater channels also left large volumes of glaciolacustrine deposits behind. By about 10,000 BC, the course of Eagle Creek had become ice-free and, by about 7000 BC, the drainage basin and geomorphology began to resemble that of present-day.

At the southern most point of Eagle Creek is the Stranraer Terrace. The northern slopes of the Stranraer Terrace, which rises 150 metres (490 ft) above the surrounding terrain, flow into the river. The terrace is considered to be the northern extreme limit of the Missouri Coteau.

== Course ==
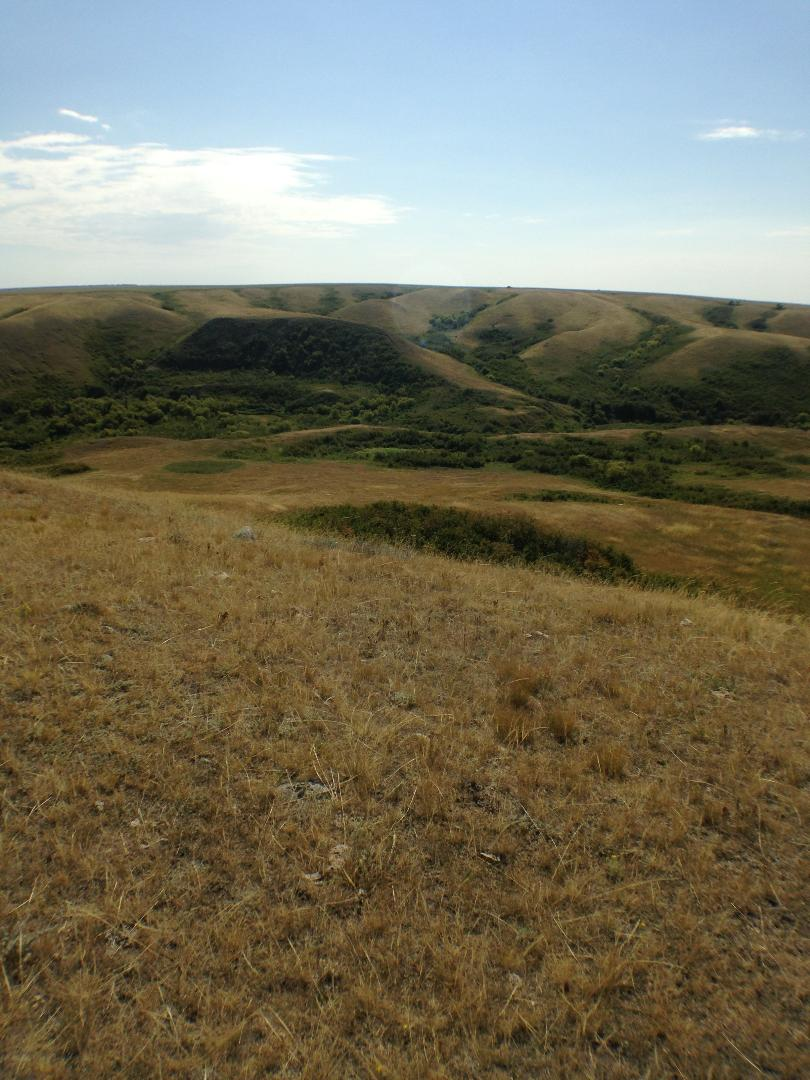
The buffalo jump at Coal Mine Creek coulee near Herschel and the Ancient Echoes Interpretive Centre

Eagle Creek's headwaters are at the kikiskitotawânawak iskwêwak Lakes (formerly Killsquaw Lakes) near Unity. A short stream – about 3 kilometres (1.9 mi) long — flows from those lakes south-east into the small, narrow Eaglehill Lake. It is at the eastern end of Eaglehill Lake in the RM of Tramping Lake No. 380 that Eagle Creek begins. The river's course from beginning to end has a "U" shape to it. From Eaglehill Lake, the river flows into the valley formed from glacial meltwaters and meanders southward where it is met by a short creek from Scott Reservoir and then widens to form Tramping Lake. Tramping Lake, at 1,467.5 hectares (3,626 acres), is a long, shallow, and narrow lake that snakes along the valley floor. From the southern end of Tramping Lake, Eagle Creek carries on southward and flows into the 1,383-hectare (3,420-acre), man-made Opuntia Lake. From the Opuntia Lake, the river heads south-east towards the Stranraer Terrace and the communities of Stranraer, Herschel, and Rosetown. At Stranraer, Twin Towers Ski Resort had ski runs that went down into Eagle Creek Valley. After being open for over 30 years, the ski resort closed in 2009. At Herschel, there's the Ancient Echoes Interpretive Centre and a buffalo jump at Coal Mine Creek coulee. After Rosetown, Eagle Creek heads east and flows out of the valley and into the flatter prairie. From there, the river re-enters a valley and begins its northward journey towards the North Saskatchewan River.

Along the river's course, in the RM of Harris No. 316, is Eagle Creek Cement Bridge. It was built in 1925 and is on the Canadian Register of Historic Places. The bridge is a reinforced concrete, double-span bowstring bridge, one of nearly 90 such bridges constructed on the 1920s and 1930s in southern Saskatchewan.

== Eagle Creek Regional Park ==
Eagle Creek Regional Park (52.2167°N 107.4006°W) is a regional park along the course of Eagle Creek in the RM of Eagle Creek, 24 kilometres (15 mi) north-west of Asquith. It was founded in 1963 and refurbished in 1985. In 1994, a local bridge was moved to the park to cross the river and, in 2004, a church was moved to the park from Kinley. A hall with a full kitchen and deck for entertainment was also moved to the park. Other facilities include a campground, trout pond, golf course, mini golf, disk golf, ball diamonds, and three hiking trails. Access to the park is from Highway 376.

The campground has 67 electrical sites and 22 non-serviced and tenting areas. Potable water, washrooms, and showers are available at the campground.

The man-made trout pond is stocked and has a dock for fishing. Fishing in the river is also permitted.

The 9-hole golf course has artificial greens and is a par 35 with 2,295 total yards.

== See also ==
- List of rivers of Saskatchewan
- Hudson Bay drainage basin
- Tourism in Saskatchewan
