= Scott Reservoir (Saskatchewan) =

Reservoir in Saskatchewan, Canada

- Location in Saskatchewan Scott Reservoir (Canada)
- Location: RM of Reford No. 379, Saskatchewan
- Coordinates: 52.3464°N 108.7745°W
- Type: Reservoir
- Part of: Saskatchewan River drainage basin
- Primary outflows: Eagle Creek
- Basin countries: Canada
- Managing agency: Saskatchewan Water Security Agency
- Built: 1929
- Surface area: 12.6 ha (31 acres)
- Max. depth: 8.9 m (29 ft)
- Water volume: 590 dam^{3} (480 acre⋅ft)
- Shore length^{1}: 3.5 km (2.2 mi)
- Settlements: None
- ^{1} Shore length is not a well-defined measure.

Scott Reservoir is a man-made reservoir in the Canadian province of Saskatchewan. It was formed with the construction of the Scott Dam in 1929. The reservoir is in the Rural Municipality of Reford No. 379 along a tributary of Eagle Creek. Nearby communities include Scott and Wilkie.

Scott Reservoir is stocked yearly with 5,000 rainbow trout.

== Scott Dam ==
Scott Dam (52.3465°N 108.7771°W) was built in 1929 in a coulee along a tributary of Eagle Creek. The dam is 14.5 metres (48 ft) high and holds back the reservoir with a water volume of 590 dam^{3} (480 acre⋅ft). It is owned and operated by the Saskatchewan Water Security Agency.

== See also ==
- List of lakes of Saskatchewan
- List of dams and reservoirs in Canada
