= Kinley, Saskatchewan =

Village in Saskatchewan, Canada

Kinley
- Village
- Village of Kinley
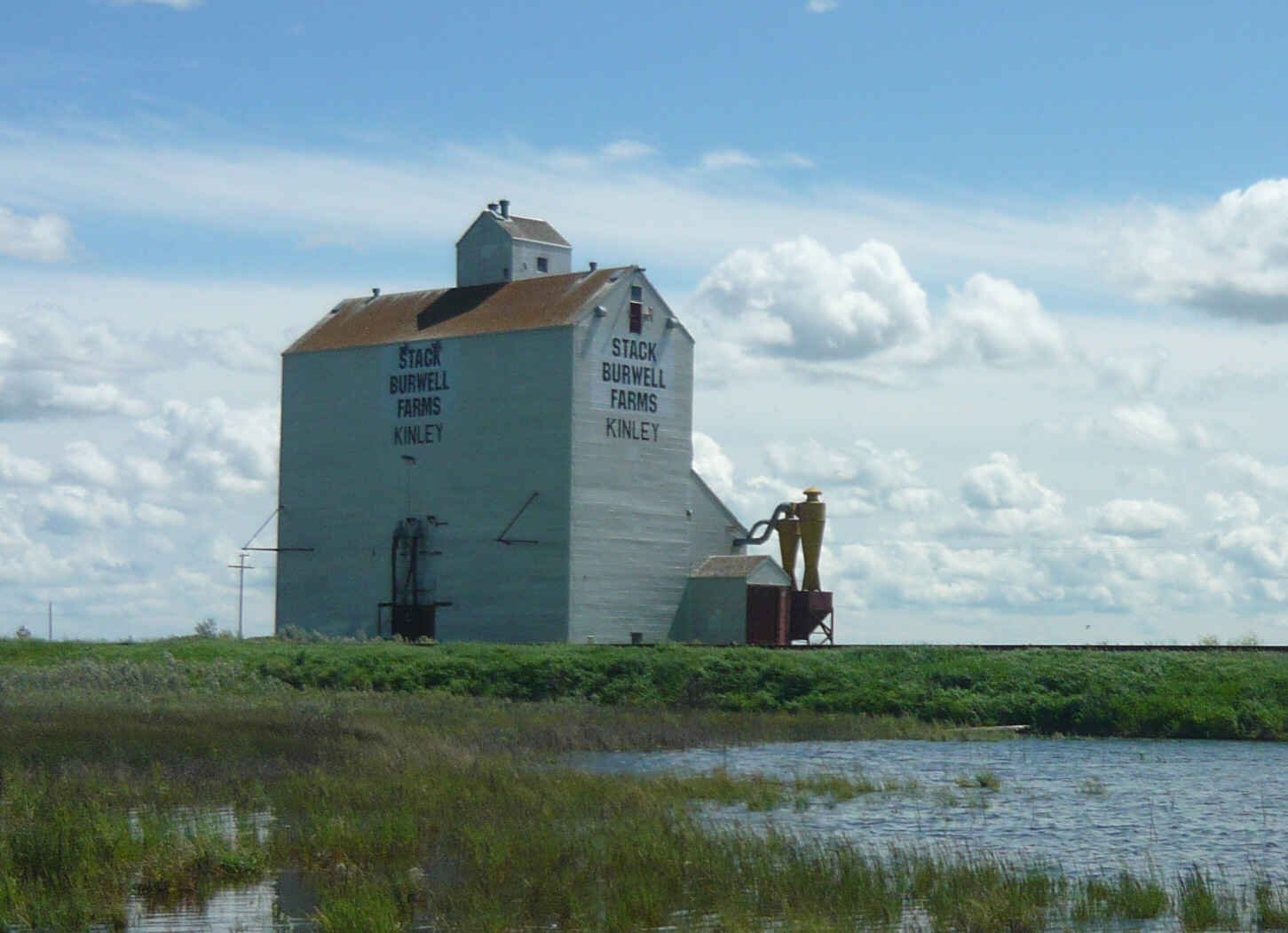
- Grain elevator in Kinley

- Location of Kinley in Saskatchewan Kinley (Canada)
- Coordinates: 52.018°N 107.427°W
- Country: Canada
- Province: Saskatchewan
- Region: Central
- Census division: 12
- Rural Municipality: Perdue No. 346
- Post office Founded (closer): 1908 to 1991
- Incorporated (Village): January 7, 1909

Government
  - Type: Municipal
  - Governing body: Kinley Village Council
  - Mayor: Gilbert Perron
  - Administrator: Gaylene Quiring
  - MP: Kelly Block
  - MLA: Jim Reiter

Area
  - Total: 1.18 km^{2} (0.46 sq mi)

Population (2016)
  - Total: 60
  - Density: 50.7/km^{2} (131/sq mi)
- Time zone: UTC-6 (CST)
- Postal code: S0K 2E0
- Area code: 306
- Highways: Highway 14
- Railways: Canadian National Railway

Kinley (2016 population: 60) is a village in the Canadian province of Saskatchewan within the Rural Municipality of Perdue No. 346 and Census Division No. 12. The village of Kinley is located about 55 kilometres (34 mi) west of the city of Saskatoon on Highway 14, between the communities of Perdue 10 kilometres (6.2 mi) west and Asquith 17 kilometres (11 mi) east.

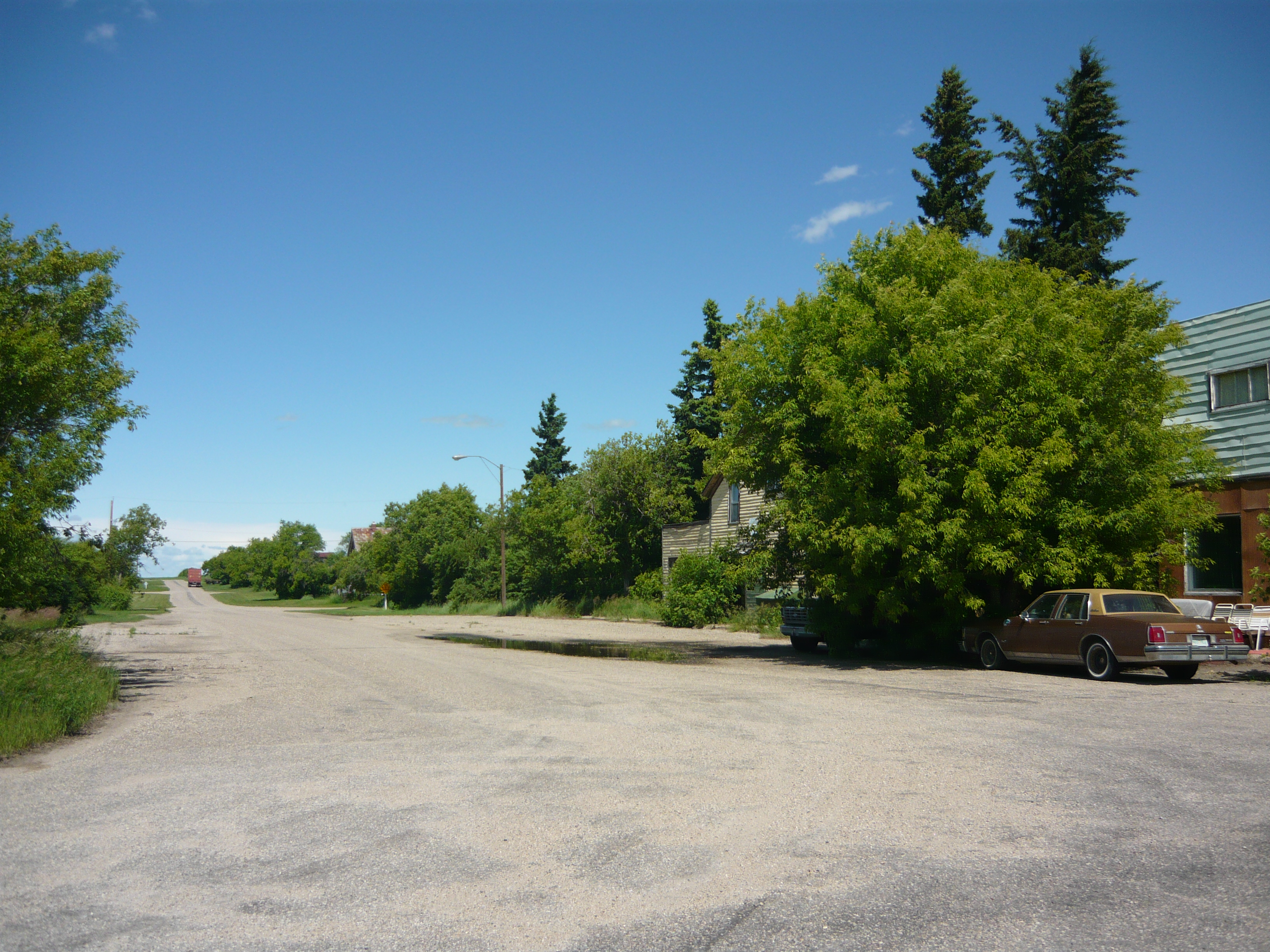
Kinley's Main Street, 2011

== History ==
Kinley incorporated as a village on January 7, 1909.

== Demographics ==
Population history (1981–2016)
Year	Pop.	±%
1981	54	—
1986	57	+5.6%
1991	32	−43.9%
1996	31	−3.1%
2001	40	+29.0%
2006	35	−12.5%
2011	45	+28.6%
2016	60	+33.3%
Source: Statistics Canada via Saskatchewan Bureau of Statistics

In the 2021 Census of Population conducted by Statistics Canada, Kinley had a population of 60 living in 29 of its 34 total private dwellings, a change of 0% from its 2016 population of 60. With a land area of 1.18 km^{2} (0.46 sq mi), it had a population density of 50.8/km^{2} (131.7/sq mi) in 2021.

In the 2016 Census of Population, the village of Kinley recorded a population of 60 living in 27 of its 29 total private dwellings, a 25% change from its 2011 population of 45. With a land area of 1.18 km^{2} (0.46 sq mi), it had a population density of 50.8/km^{2} (131.7/sq mi) in 2016.

== Government ==
The Village of Kinley is governed by two councillors, a mayor, and an administrator.

Provincially, the village is within the Rosetown-Delisle electoral district, whose current MLA is Jim Reiter of the Saskatchewan Party.

Federally the village is within the riding of Carlton Trail-Eagle Creek whose current MP is Kelly Block of the Conservative Party of Canada.

== Education ==
School aged children are bused from Kinley to the communities of Perdue or Asquith, both of which have kindergarten to grade 12 schools.

== See also ==
- List of communities in Saskatchewan
- List of villages in Saskatchewan
