= Alkali manufacture =

Industrial process

Alkali manufacture is the process of creating alkalis, which are a set of chemical substances that are basic metal salts. Many alkalis have been or are produced in large quantities due to their widespread use, especially in industrial and chemical processes. Some of the most recognizable and produced alkalis include caustic soda (sodium hydroxide) and caustic potash (potassium hydroxide) which are both also known as lye, slaked lime (calcium hydroxide), soda ash (sodium carbonate), potash (potassium carbonate), and lime (calcium carbonate), which are the hydroxides and carbonates of sodium, potassium, and calcium.

== The lime process ==
Historically, sodium hydroxide was produced by treating sodium carbonate (usually from seaweed ash or "glasswort"-plant ash) with calcium hydroxide (a.k.a. lime) in a metathesis reaction. (Sodium hydroxide is soluble while calcium carbonate is not.) This process was called causticizing.

$$\ce{Ca(OH)2(aq) + Na2CO3(s) -> CaCO3 v + 2 NaOH(aq)}$$

== The Leblanc process ==
The Leblanc process, which was invented by Nicolas Leblanc around 1790, begins with the decomposition of sodium chloride by sulfuric acid, by which sodium sulfate and hydrochloric acid are produced. The sodium sulfate is afterwards fired with calcium carbonate and coal. Sodium carbonate can be extracted from this mixture by washing the mixture with water.

Until the rise of the ammonia-soda process, which has better economics, the Leblanc process was used extensively making the United Kingdom the lead in alkali production. By the early 20th century, the UK's production outstripped that of all other producers combined.

Most of the British alkali works are situated in South Lancashire and the adjoining part of Cheshire, near the mouth of the Tyne and in the West of Scotland.

== The ammonia–soda process ==
In the 1870s the lime process was revolutionary improved to result in the ammonia-soda process, which is the most common method today. The overall reaction appears simple

$$\ce{2NaCl + CaCO3 -> Na2CO3 + CaCl2}$$

However, its actual implementation of this overall reaction is very inventive. A simplified description can be given using the four different, interacting chemical reactions illustrated in the figure. In the first step in the process, carbon dioxide (CO_{2}) passes through a concentrated aqueous solution of sodium chloride (table salt, NaCl) and ammonia (NH_{3}).

$\ce{NaCl + CO2 + NH3 + H2O -> NaHCO3 + NH4Cl}$ ---(I)

In industrial practice, the reaction is carried out by passing concentrated brine (salt water) through two towers. In the first, ammonia bubbles up through the brine and is absorbed by it. In the second, carbon dioxide bubbles up through the ammoniated brine, and sodium bicarbonate (baking soda) precipitates out of the solution. Note that, in a basic solution, NaHCO_{3} is less water-soluble than sodium chloride. The ammonia (NH_{3}) buffers the solution at a basic (high) pH; without the ammonia, a hydrochloric acid byproduct would render the solution acidic, and arrest the precipitation. Here, NH_{3} along with ammoniacal brine acts as a mother liquor.

There are a number of reasons for this:

- The sodium used in the process is practically free.
- The fuel requirement is halved.
- Efficiency improvements have reduced 'waste' in the process to a minimum.

The only way in which the Leblanc process could still hold its own was by being turned in the direction of making caustic soda, to which it lends itself more easily than the ammonia-soda process; but the latter has invaded even this field. One advantage, however, still remained to the Leblanc process. All endeavours to obtain either hydrochloric acid or free chlorine in the ammonia-soda process have proved commercial failures, all the chlorine of the sodium chloride being ultimately lost in the shape of worthless calcium chloride. The Leblanc process thus remained the sole purveyor of chlorine in its active forms, and in this way the fact is accounted for that, at least in Great Britain, the Leblanc process still furnishes nearly half of all the alkali made, though in other countries its proportional share is much less. The profit made upon the chlorine produced has to make up for the loss on the alkali.

The ammonia-soda process was first patented on 30 June 1838 by Harrison Gray Dyar and John Hemming, who carried it out on an experimental scale in Whitechapel. Many attempts were soon after made in the same direction, both in England and on the continent of Europe, the most remarkable of which was the ingenious combination of apparatus devised by J. J. T. Schloesing and E. Rolland. But a really economical solution of the problem was first definitely found in 1872 by Ernest Solvay, as the result of investigations begun about ten years previously. The greater portion of all the soda-ash of commerce is now made by Solvay's apparatus, which alone shall be described in this place, although it should be borne in mind that the principles laid down by Dyar and Hemming have been and are still successfully carried out in a number of factories by an entirely different kind of apparatus.

== Other processes ==
- Chloralkali process
- Castner-Kellner process
