= Feudal, Saskatchewan =

Hamlet in Saskatchewan, Canada

Feudal
- Hamlet
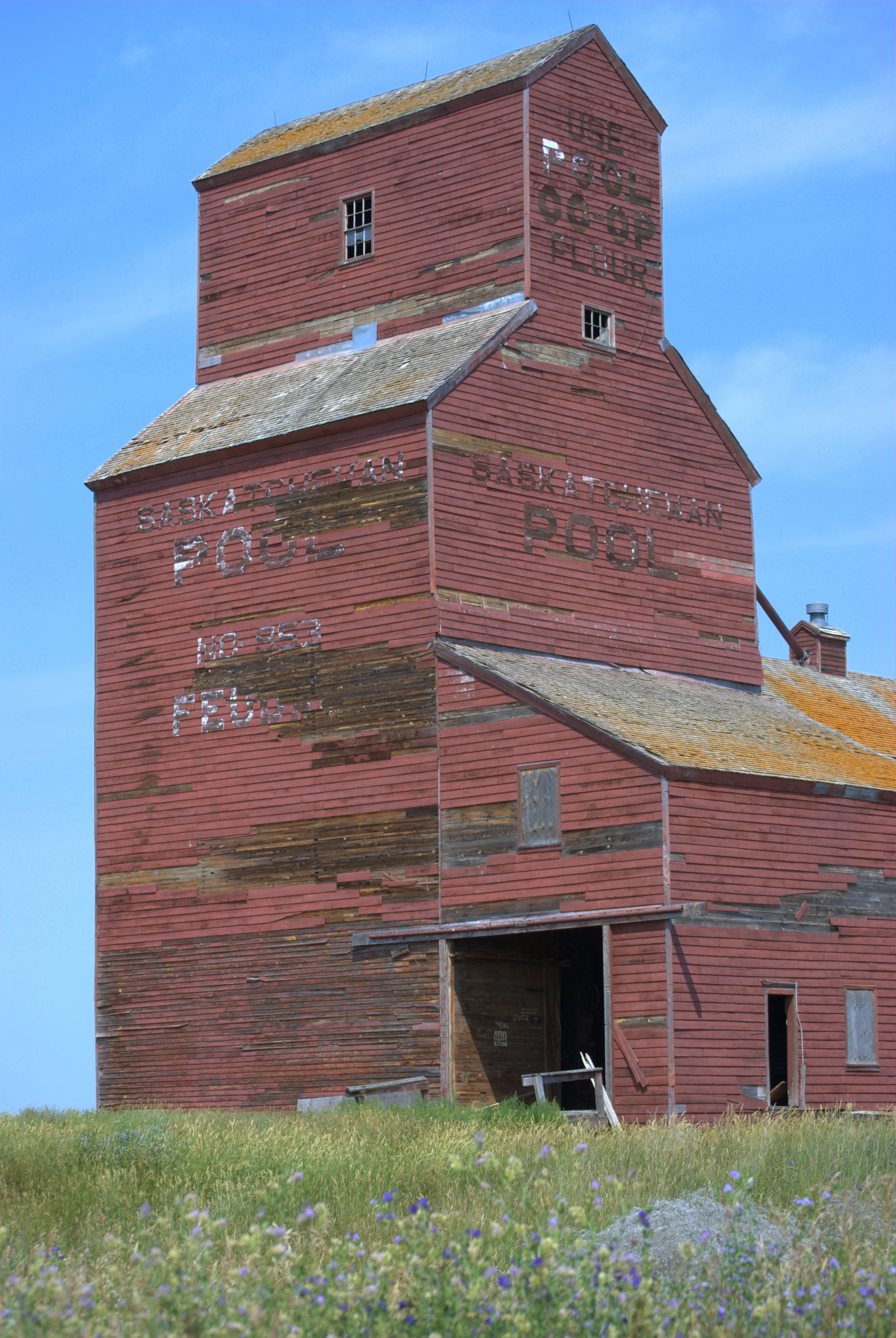
- Feudal grain elevator

- Location within Saskatchewan Location within Canada
- Coordinates: 51.5300°N 107.3600°W
- Country: Canada
- Province: Saskatchewan
- Region: Southwest
- Census division: 12
- Rural municipality: Perdue No. 346

Government
  - Governing body: Perdue No. 346
  - Reeve: Bill Peters
  - Administrator: Allan Kirzinger
- Time zone: CST
- Area code: 306
- Highways: Highway 655
- Railways: Canadian Pacific Railway defunct

Feudal is a hamlet in the Rural Municipality of Perdue No. 346, Saskatchewan, Canada. The hamlet is located at the junction of Highway 655 and Township Road 340 approximately 15 kilometres (9.3 mi) north of the village of Harris.

== See also ==
- List of communities in Saskatchewan
- List of hamlets in Saskatchewan
