= Rural Municipality of Perdue No. 346 =

Rural municipality in Saskatchewan, Canada

Perdue No. 346
- Rural municipality
- Rural Municipality of Perdue No. 346
- Location of the RM of Perdue No. 346 in Saskatchewan
- Coordinates: 52.042°N 107.483°W
- Country: Canada
- Province: Saskatchewan
- Census division: 12
- SARM division: 5
- Formed: December 13, 1909

Government
  - Reeve: John Gray
  - Governing body: RM of Perdue No. 346 Council
  - Administrator: Allan Kirzinger
  - Office location: Perdue

Area (2016)
  - Land: 826.14 km^{2} (318.97 sq mi)

Population (2016)
  - Total: 445
  - Density: 0.5/km^{2} (1.3/sq mi)
- Time zone: CST
  - Summer (DST): CST
- Area codes: 306 and 639

The Rural Municipality of Perdue No. 346 (2016 population: 445) is a rural municipality (RM) in the Canadian province of Saskatchewan within Census Division No. 12 and SARM Division No. 5.

== History ==
The RM of Perdue No. 346 incorporated as a rural municipality on December 13, 1909.

== Geography ==
=== Communities and localities ===
The following urban municipalities are surrounded by the RM.

Villages

- Perdue
- Kinley

The following unincorporated communities are within the RM.

Localities

- Feudal
- Catherwood
- Juniata
- Keppel
- Leney (dissolved as a village, December 31, 1971)

== Demographics ==
Population history (1981–2016)
Year	Pop.	±%
1981	502	—
1986	516	+2.8%
1991	482	−6.6%
1996	439	−8.9%
2001	430	−2.1%
2006	432	+0.5%
2011	463	+7.2%
2016	445	−3.9%
Source: Statistics Canada via Saskatchewan Bureau of Statistics

In the 2021 Census of Population conducted by Statistics Canada, the RM of Perdue No. 346 had a population of 471 living in 126 of its 153 total private dwellings, a change of 5.8% from its 2016 population of 445. With a land area of 818.49 km^{2} (316.02 sq mi), it had a population density of 0.6/km^{2} (1.5/sq mi) in 2021.

In the 2016 Census of Population, the RM of Perdue No. 346 recorded a population of 445 living in 133 of its 156 total private dwellings, a −3.9% change from its 2011 population of 463. With a land area of 826.14 km^{2} (318.97 sq mi), it had a population density of 0.5/km^{2} (1.4/sq mi) in 2016.

== Government ==
The RM of Perdue No. 346 is governed by an elected municipal council and an appointed administrator that meets on the second Tuesday of every month. The reeve of the RM is John Gray while its administrator is Allan Kirzinger. The RM's office is located in Perdue.

== Transportation ==
- Saskatchewan Highway 14
- Saskatchewan Highway 655
- Canadian National Railway
- Canadian Pacific Railway

== See also ==
- List of rural municipalities in Saskatchewan
