= Tramping Lake (Saskatchewan) =

Lake in Saskatchewan, Canada

- Location in Saskatchewan Tramping Lake (Canada)
- Location: West-central Saskatchewan
- Coordinates: 52.1334°N 108.8174°W
- Type: Lake
- Part of: Saskatchewan River drainage basin
- Primary inflows: Eagle Creek
- Primary outflows: Eagle Creek
- Basin countries: Canada
- Surface area: 1,468 ha (3,630 acres)
- Max. depth: 4 m (13 ft)
- Shore length^{1}: 93 km (58 mi)
- Surface elevation: 631 m (2,070 ft)
- Settlements: None
- ^{1} Shore length is not a well-defined measure.

Tramping Lake is a lake in the Canadian province of Saskatchewan. It is along the course of Eagle Creek in the west-central part of Saskatchewan. It runs in a north to south direction along Eagle Creek Valley. Upstream is Eaglehill Lake (the source of Eagle Creek) and downstream is the man-made Opuntia Lake. At the northern end of the lake on a tributary of Eagle Creek is Scott Dam, which impounds Scott Reservoir. Both Opuntia Lake and Scott Reservoir are owned and operated by the Saskatchewan Water Security Agency. The lake acts as the eastern boundary for the RMs of Tramping Lake No. 380 and Mariposa No. 350 and the western boundary for the RMs of Reford No. 379, Grandview No. 349.

Tramping Lake Regional Park, which is at the southern end of the lake, hosts the annual Tralapa Music and Sports Festival.

== See also ==
- List of lakes of Saskatchewan
