= Kikiskitotawânawak iskwêwak Lakes =

Group of lakes in Saskatchewan, Canada

kikiskitotawânawak iskwêwak Lakes
- Killsquaw Lakes
- Location in Saskatchewan kikiskitotawânawak iskwêwak Lakes (Canada)
- Location: West-central Saskatchewan
- Coordinates: 52.4001°N 109.1007°W
- Etymology: Cree for 'We honour the women'
- Part of: Saskatchewan River drainage basin
- Primary inflows: Dempster Brook
- Basin countries: Canada
- Surface area: 1,250 ha (3,100 acres)
- Shore length^{1}: 56 km (35 mi)
- Surface elevation: 626 m (2,054 ft)
- ^{1} Shore length is not a well-defined measure.

Kikiskitotawânawak iskwêwak Lakes, formerly Killsquaw Lakes, are a group of small lakes in the Canadian province of Saskatchewan at the headwaters of Eagle Creek. Eagle Creek is a tributary of the North Saskatchewan River. The kikiskitotawânawak iskwêwak Lakes, consisting of one larger lake and several smaller lakes, are about 1.6 kilometres (1 mi) south-east of the town of Unity and cover an area of about 1,250 hectares (3,100 acres).

The lakes' main inflow, Dempster Book, originates to the north and flows into the eastern end of the largest lake in the group. The outflow leaves the lakes from the eastern end, just south of where Dempster Brook enters, and flows a short distance — about 3 kilometres (1.9 mi) — into Eaglehill Lake, the source of Eagle Creek.

== Renaming ==
The original name for the group of lakes was Killsquaw Lakes with the largest lake in the group being called Killsquaw Lake. The naming originated from an event in the 19th century where Blackfoot warriors killed several Indigenous Cree women who were fetching water at the lakes. The word squaw is a derogatory word meaning "Indigenous woman". While "squaw" was not originally meant to be derogatory, over time it has become as such. A campaign to rename the lakes was started by Kellie Wuttunee from the Red Pheasant First Nation with 'kikiskitotawânawak iskwêwak Lakes' eventually being chosen. Kikiskitotawânawak iskwêwak means "we honour the women" in Cree. The name was officially changed in November 2018 with a renaming ceremony held on 11 June 2019 near Unity.

== See also ==
- List of lakes of Saskatchewan
- List of place names in Canada of Indigenous origin
