= Buffalo grass =

Buffalo grass may refer to

- Buffalo grass, sweet vernal grass or vanilla grass (Anthoxanthum odoratum)
- Buffalo grass (Bouteloua dactyloides)
- Buffalo grass (Brachiaria mutica)
- Buffalo grass or sweet grass (Hierochloe odorata)
- Buffalo grass or St. Augustine grass (Stenotaphrum secundatum)
- Buffalograss, another name for Guinea grass (Panicum maximum)
- Buffalo grass or carabao grass (Paspalum conjugatum)

== See also ==
- Cenchrus ciliaris, a grass species also known as "buffel grass"
