= Scott, Saskatchewan =

Town in Saskatchewan, Canada

Scott
- Town
- Location of Scott in Saskatchewan Scott (Canada)
- Coordinates: 52.293°N 108.951°W
- Country: Canada
- Province: Saskatchewan
- Census division: 13
- Rural Municipality: Tramping Lake
- Post office Founded: N/A
- Incorporated (Village): N/A
- Incorporated (Town): N/A

Government
  - Mayor: Barnabas Luckey
  - Town Manager: Aldo Brandino
  - Governing body: Scott Town Council

Area
  - Total: 4.33 km^{2} (1.67 sq mi)

Population (2021)
  - Total: 74
  - Density: 17/km^{2} (44/sq mi)
- Time zone: CST
- Postal code: S0K 4A0
- Area code: 306
- Highways: Highway 374

Scott is a town in the Rural Municipality of Tramping Lake No. 380, Saskatchewan, Canada. The population was 74 at the 2021 Canada Census. The town is south of the junction of Highway 14 and Highway 374, approximately 10 km west of the town of Wilkie. Scott was known as Saskatchewan's smallest town, but is now second smallest to Fleming.

== Demographics ==
In the 2021 Census of Population conducted by Statistics Canada, Scott had a population of 74 living in 39 of its 44 total private dwellings, a change of 1.4% from its 2016 population of 73. With a land area of 4.17 km^{2} (1.61 sq mi), it had a population density of 17.7/km^{2} (46.0/sq mi) in 2021.

== Attractions ==
- Scott Experimental Farm

== Climate ==
Scott experiences a Humid continental climate, with long, extremely cold winters and warm summers. The highest temperature ever recorded in Scott was 39.4 °C (103 °F) on 16 June 1933 and 16 August 2003. The coldest temperature ever recorded was −50.6 °C (−59 °F) on 15 February 1936.

Climate data for Scott, 1981–2010 normals, extremes 1911–present
Month	Jan	Feb	Mar	Apr	May	Jun	Jul	Aug	Sep	Oct	Nov	Dec	Year
Record high °C (°F)	8.0 (46.4)	11.7 (53.1)	23.4 (74.1)	33.3 (91.9)	37.2 (99.0)	39.4 (102.9)	37.8 (100.0)	39.4 (102.9)	36.1 (97.0)	30.6 (87.1)	20.0 (68.0)	13.3 (55.9)	39.4 (102.9)
Mean daily maximum °C (°F)	−10.0 (14.0)	−7.6 (18.3)	−0.4 (31.3)	10.2 (50.4)	17.7 (63.9)	21.7 (71.1)	23.7 (74.7)	23.6 (74.5)	17.2 (63.0)	9.7 (49.5)	−3.3 (26.1)	−8.9 (16.0)	7.8 (46.0)
Daily mean °C (°F)	−15.5 (4.1)	−12.9 (8.8)	−5.5 (22.1)	3.8 (38.8)	10.8 (51.4)	15.3 (59.5)	17.1 (62.8)	16.5 (61.7)	10.4 (50.7)	3.3 (37.9)	−7.8 (18.0)	−13.9 (7.0)	1.8 (35.2)
Mean daily minimum °C (°F)	−20.9 (−5.6)	−18.2 (−0.8)	−10.4 (13.3)	−2.7 (27.1)	3.8 (38.8)	8.8 (47.8)	10.5 (50.9)	9.4 (48.9)	3.6 (38.5)	−3.1 (26.4)	−12.1 (10.2)	−18.9 (−2.0)	−4.2 (24.4)
Record low °C (°F)	−48.3 (−54.9)	−50.6 (−59.1)	−41.7 (−43.1)	−30.6 (−23.1)	−12.5 (9.5)	−6.7 (19.9)	−2.8 (27.0)	−2.8 (27.0)	−13.3 (8.1)	−27.8 (−18.0)	−36.7 (−34.1)	−44.4 (−47.9)	−50.6 (−59.1)
Average precipitation mm (inches)	14.9 (0.59)	9.1 (0.36)	14.4 (0.57)	21.6 (0.85)	36.3 (1.43)	61.8 (2.43)	72.1 (2.84)	45.7 (1.80)	36.0 (1.42)	17.9 (0.70)	22.2 (0.87)	14.0 (0.55)	366.2 (14.42)
Average rainfall mm (inches)	0.8 (0.03)	0.1 (0.00)	1.1 (0.04)	14.1 (0.56)	34.8 (1.37)	61.8 (2.43)	72.1 (2.84)	45.7 (1.80)	32.9 (1.30)	12.2 (0.48)	2.0 (0.08)	0.1 (0.00)	277.7 (10.93)
Average snowfall cm (inches)	16.8 (6.6)	10.2 (4.0)	14.3 (5.6)	9.0 (3.5)	1.5 (0.6)	0.0 (0.0)	0.0 (0.0)	0.0 (0.0)	1.7 (0.7)	5.8 (2.3)	20.8 (8.2)	14.8 (5.8)	94.9 (37.4)
Mean monthly sunshine hours	88.7	119.3	163.8	230.6	267.6	263.5	308.6	290.4	196.4	161.0	80.7	60.8	2,238.6
Percentage possible sunshine	34.6	42.8	44.6	55.3	55.0	52.6	61.2	63.8	51.5	48.7	30.5	28.2	47.4
Source: Environment Canada

== See also ==
- List of communities in Saskatchewan
- List of towns in Saskatchewan
