= Rural Municipality of Tramping Lake No. 380 =

Rural municipality in Saskatchewan, Canada

Tramping Lake No. 380
- Rural municipality
- Rural Municipality of Tramping Lake No. 380
- Location of the RM of Tramping Lake No. 380 in Saskatchewan
- Coordinates: 52.277°N 108.986°W
- Country: Canada
- Province: Saskatchewan
- Census division: 13
- SARM division: 6
- Formed: December 12, 1910

Government
  - Reeve: Peter Volk
  - Governing body: RM of Tramping Lake No. 380 Council
  - Administrator: Stacy Hawkins
  - Office location: Scott

Area (2016)
  - Land: 615.56 km^{2} (237.67 sq mi)

Population (2016)
  - Total: 375
  - Density: 0.6/km^{2} (1.6/sq mi)
- Time zone: CST
  - Summer (DST): CST
- Area codes: 306 and 639

The Rural Municipality of Tramping Lake No. 380 (2016 population: 375) is a rural municipality (RM) in the Canadian province of Saskatchewan within Census Division No. 13 and SARM Division No. 6.

== History ==
The RM of Tramping Lake No. 380 incorporated as a rural municipality on December 12, 1910.

== Geography ==
=== Communities and localities ===
The following urban municipalities are surrounded by the RM.

Towns

- Scott

The following unincorporated communities are within the RM.

Localities

- Revenue (dissolved as a village, November 1, 1967)
- Tako

== Demographics ==
Population history (1981–2016)
Year	Pop.	±%
1981	453	—
1986	402	−11.3%
1991	390	−3.0%
1996	408	+4.6%
2001	407	−0.2%
2006	403	−1.0%
2011	410	+1.7%
2016	375	−8.5%
Source: Statistics Canada via Saskatchewan Bureau of Statistics

In the 2021 Census of Population conducted by Statistics Canada, the RM of Tramping Lake No. 380 had a population of 402 living in 74 of its 83 total private dwellings, a change of 7.2% from its 2016 population of 375. With a land area of 605.12 km^{2} (233.64 sq mi), it had a population density of 0.7/km^{2} (1.7/sq mi) in 2021.

In the 2016 Census of Population, the RM of Tramping Lake No. 380 recorded a population of 375 living in 77 of its 96 total private dwellings, a −8.5% change from its 2011 population of 410. With a land area of 615.56 km^{2} (237.67 sq mi), it had a population density of 0.6/km^{2} (1.6/sq mi) in 2016.

== Attractions ==
- Scott Experimental Farm
- Tramping Lake

== Government ==
The RM of Tramping Lake No. 380 is governed by an elected municipal council and an appointed administrator that meets on the first Wednesday after the first Monday of every month. The reeve of the RM is Peter Volk while its administrator is Stacy Hawkins. The RM's office is located in Scott.

== Transportation ==
- Saskatchewan Highway 14
- Saskatchewan Highway 21
- Saskatchewan Highway 374
- Saskatchewan Highway 659

== See also ==
- List of rural municipalities in Saskatchewan
