= Opuntia Lake =

Lake in Saskatchewan, Canada

- Location in Saskatchewan Opuntia Lake (Canada)
- Location: RM of Winslow No. 319 and RM of Mountain View No. 318, Saskatchewan
- Coordinates: 51.8167°N 108.5840°W
- Type: Salt lake
- Part of: Saskatchewan River drainage basin
- Primary inflows: Eagle Creek
- Primary outflows: Eagle Creek
- Basin countries: Canada
- Managing agency: Saskatchewan Water Security Agency
- Built: 1946
- First flooded: 1946
- Max. length: 9.8 km (6.1 mi)
- Max. width: 1.6 km (1 mi)
- Surface area: 1,383 ha (3,420 acres)
- Water volume: 18,919 dam^{3} (15,338 acre⋅ft)
- Shore length^{1}: 28 km (17 mi)
- Settlements: None
- ^{1} Shore length is not a well-defined measure.

Opuntia Lake is a shallow, man-made salt lake in the Canadian province of Saskatchewan. It was formed with the construction of the Opuntia Control along Eagle Creek in 1946. The lake is in the Mixed Moist Grassland ecoregion of the Great Plains and the entire lake is part of the Opuntia Lake Migratory Bird Sanctuary (MBS). The nearest community is Plenty and there are no public facilities at the lake. The nearest highway is Highway 31. The town of Biggar is about 60 kilometres (37 mi) to the north-east.

== Opuntia Lake MBS ==
Opuntia Lake MBS is a migratory bird sanctuary that encompasses all of Opuntia Lake and covers an area of 13.91 km^{2} (5.37 sq mi). It was founded in 1952 and is an important stop-over for migratory birds as it is "strategically positioned along a major flyway for geese and other waterfowl". Birds commonly found at the MBS include the Canada goose, white-fronted goose, snow goose, Ross's gull, mallard, northern pintail, sandhill crane, and the tundra swan.

== Opuntia Lake Control ==
Opuntia Lake Control (51.7619°N 108.5464°W) is a dam built in 1946 along the course of Eagle Creek. It created Opuntia Lake, which is a reservoir with a volume of 18,919 dam^{3} (668,100,000 cu ft) and is operated by the Saskatchewan Water Security Agency. The dam measures 2.1 m (6 ft 11 in) high.

== See also ==
- List of lakes of Saskatchewan
- List of dams and reservoirs in Canada
