= Unity, Saskatchewan =

Town in Saskatchewan, Canada

Unity
- Town
- Town of Unity
- Motto: Shoppertunity
- Location of Unity in Saskatchewan Unity (Canada)
- Coordinates: 52°26′0″N 109°10′0″W
- Country: Canada
- Province: Saskatchewan
- Post office Founded: 1909-04-01
- Village established: 1909-06-01
- Town incorporated: 1909-11-01

Government
  - Mayor: Bob Abel
  - Federal Electoral District Battlefords—Lloydminster MP: Rosemarie Falk
  - Provincial Constituency Cut Knife-Turtleford MLA: Ryan Domotor

Area
  - Land: 9.77 km^{2} (3.77 sq mi)

Population (2025)
  - Total: 2,519
  - Density: 244.6/km^{2} (634/sq mi)
  - Summer (DST): CST
- Postal Code: S0K 4L0
- Area code: 306-228/210
- Highways: Highway 14 / Highway 21
- Website: Official Website

Unity is a town in the western part of the Canadian province of Saskatchewan with a population of 2519. Unity is located at the intersection of Highway 14 and Highway 21, and the intersection of the CNR and CPR main rail lines. Unity is located 200 kilometres (125 mi) west-northwest of Saskatoon, Saskatchewan, and 375 kilometres (235 mi) southeast of Edmonton, Alberta. The town of Wilkie is located 33 kilometres (21 mi) to the east.

The town was the subject of playwright Kevin Kerr's Governor General's Award-winning play Unity (1918), which dramatizes the effect of the 1918 flu pandemic on Unity.

== History ==
With the coming of the Grand Trunk Pacific Railway in 1908 Unity began to grow from a small settlement in 1904 to about 600 in the 1920s. By 1966 there were 2,154 residents.

== Demographics ==
In the 2021 Census of Population conducted by Statistics Canada, Unity had a population of 2,496 living in 1,042 of its 1,148 total private dwellings, a change of −3% from its 2016 population of 2,573. With a land area of 9.7 km^{2} (3.7 sq mi), it had a population density of 257.3/km^{2} (666.5/sq mi) in 2021.

Canada census – Unity, Saskatchewan community profile

	2021	2016	2011
Population	2,496 (-3.0% from 2016)	2,573 (+7.7% from 2011)	2,389 (+11.3% from 2006)
Land area	9.70 km^{2} (3.75 sq mi)	9.77 km^{2} (3.77 sq mi)	9.77 km^{2} (3.77 sq mi)
Population density	257.3/km^{2} (666/sq mi)	263.5/km^{2} (682/sq mi)	244.6/km^{2} (634/sq mi)
Median age	42.0 (M: 40.8, F: 42.8)	39.6 (M: 37.8, F: 41.8)	42.4 (M: 39.9, F: 44.6)
Private dwellings	1,148 (total)	1,170 (total)	1,119 (total)
Median household income		$40,533

References: 2021 2016 2011

== Attractions ==
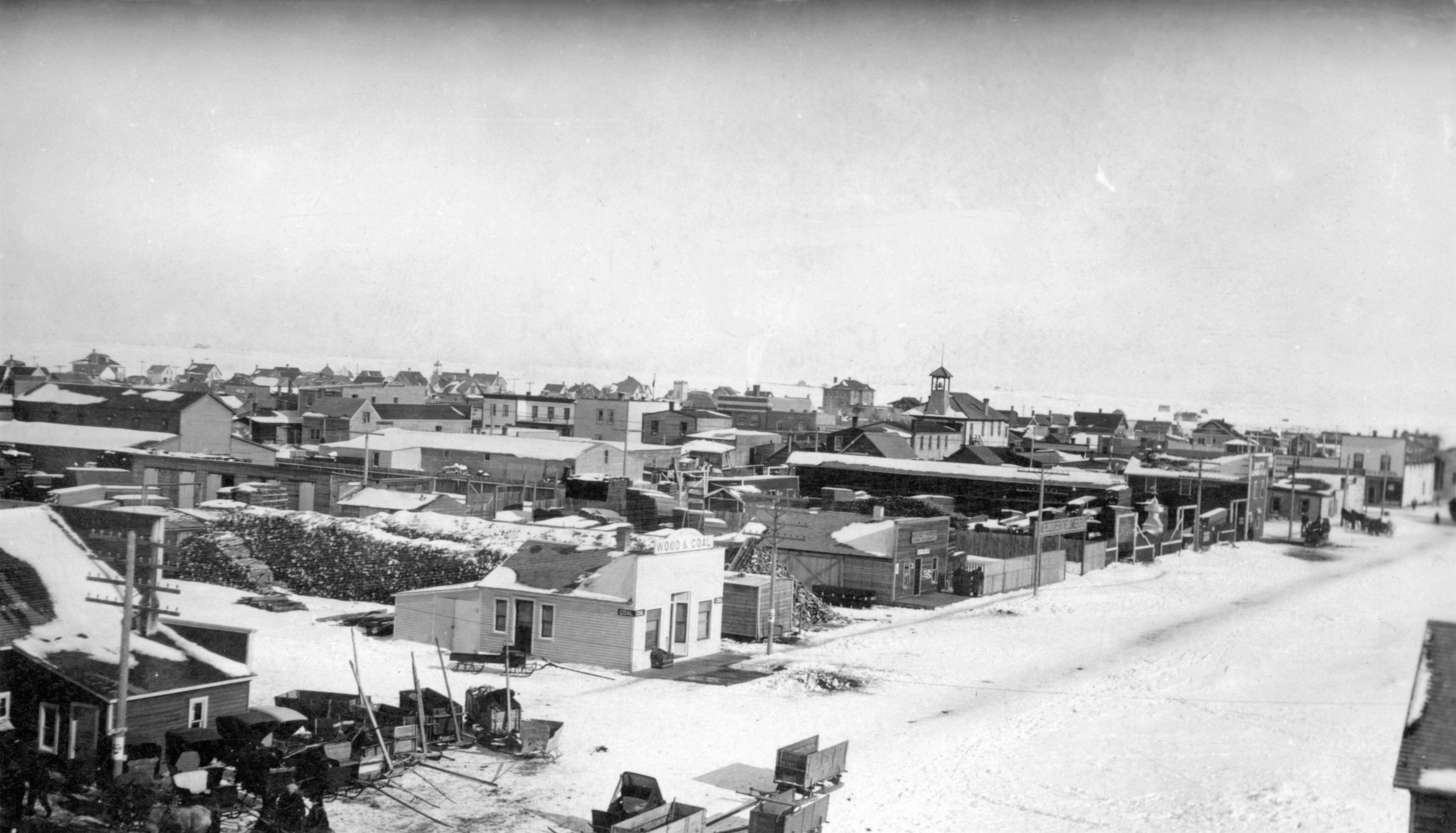
Unity, c. 1910–1920

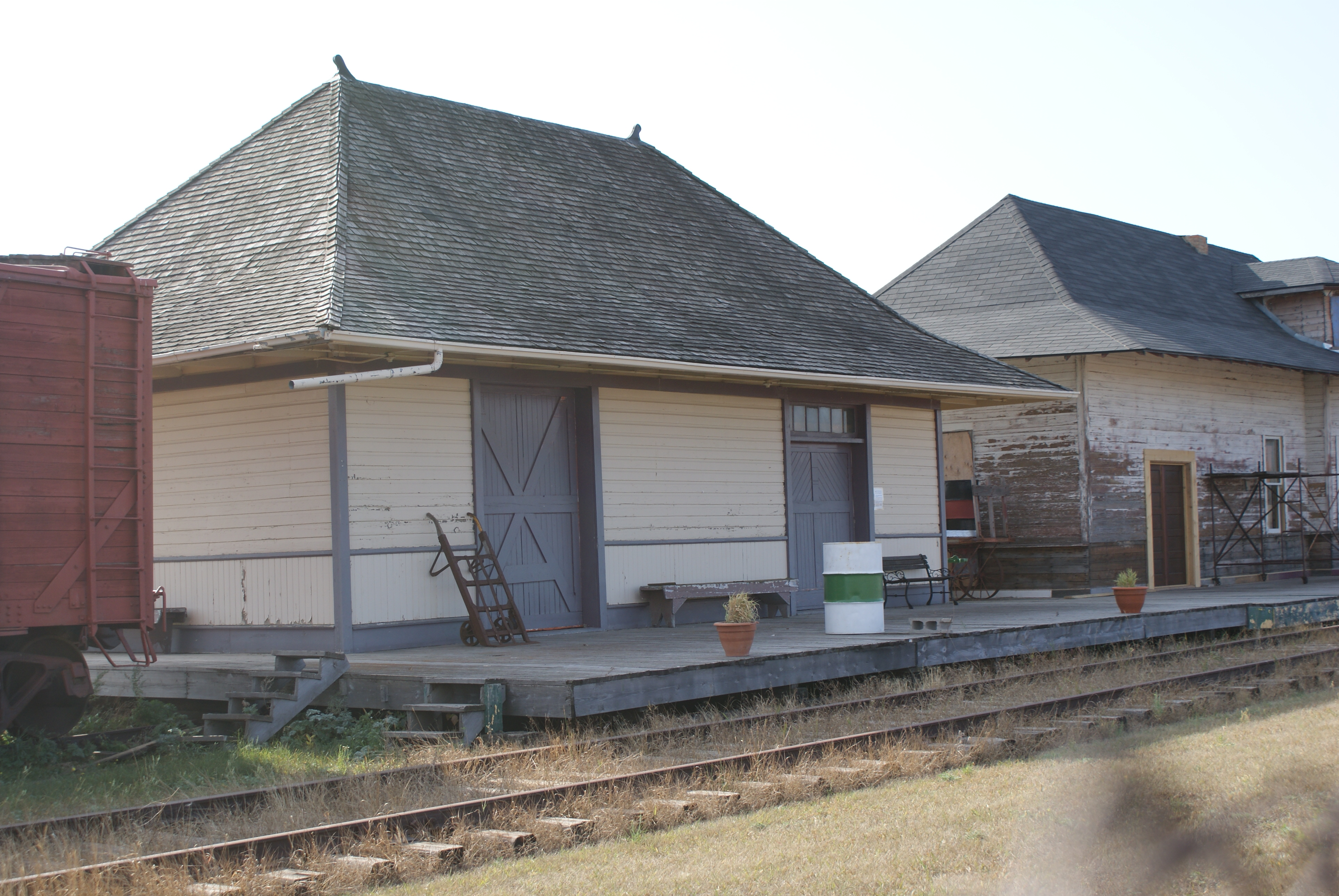
Unity Express Shed

Attractions in Unity include:

- The history murals in downtown
- Unity & District Heritage Museum
- Unity Golf Course
- Unity Regional Park housing the Unity Ball Diamonds
- Unity Arena
- Unity Credit Union Aquatics Centre
- Sink and Gordon Lakes are just to the west of Unity, providing wetlands for many migratory birds.
- Muddy Lake is just south of town.
- Kikiskitotawânawak iskwêwak Lakes (formerly Killsquaw Lakes) are about a mile south-east of town

== Education ==
Two elementary schools, St. Peter's Catholic School and Unity Public School offer kindergarten to Grade 6. Unity Composite High School (UCHS) includes Grades 7 to 12. The schools are part of Living Sky School Division No. 202.

Student Enrollment (2024–2025)
School	Grades	Enrollment
St. Peter’s Catholic School	K–6	121
Unity Public School	K–6	235
Unity Composite High School	7–12	325

== Transportation ==
The town receives Via Rail service with The Canadian calling at Unity several times per week. Unity is on the Canadian National Railway tracks. In 1924, the Canadian Pacific Railway crossed the Canadian National Railway at Topaz just west of Unity.

Services
- Preceding station	Via Rail	Following station
  Wainwright toward Vancouver	The Canadian	Biggar toward Toronto

== Notable people ==
- Boyd Gordon, NHL hockey player

== See also ==
- List of towns in Saskatchewan
