= Perdue, Saskatchewan =

Village in Saskatchewan, Canada

Perdue
- Village
- Village of Perdue
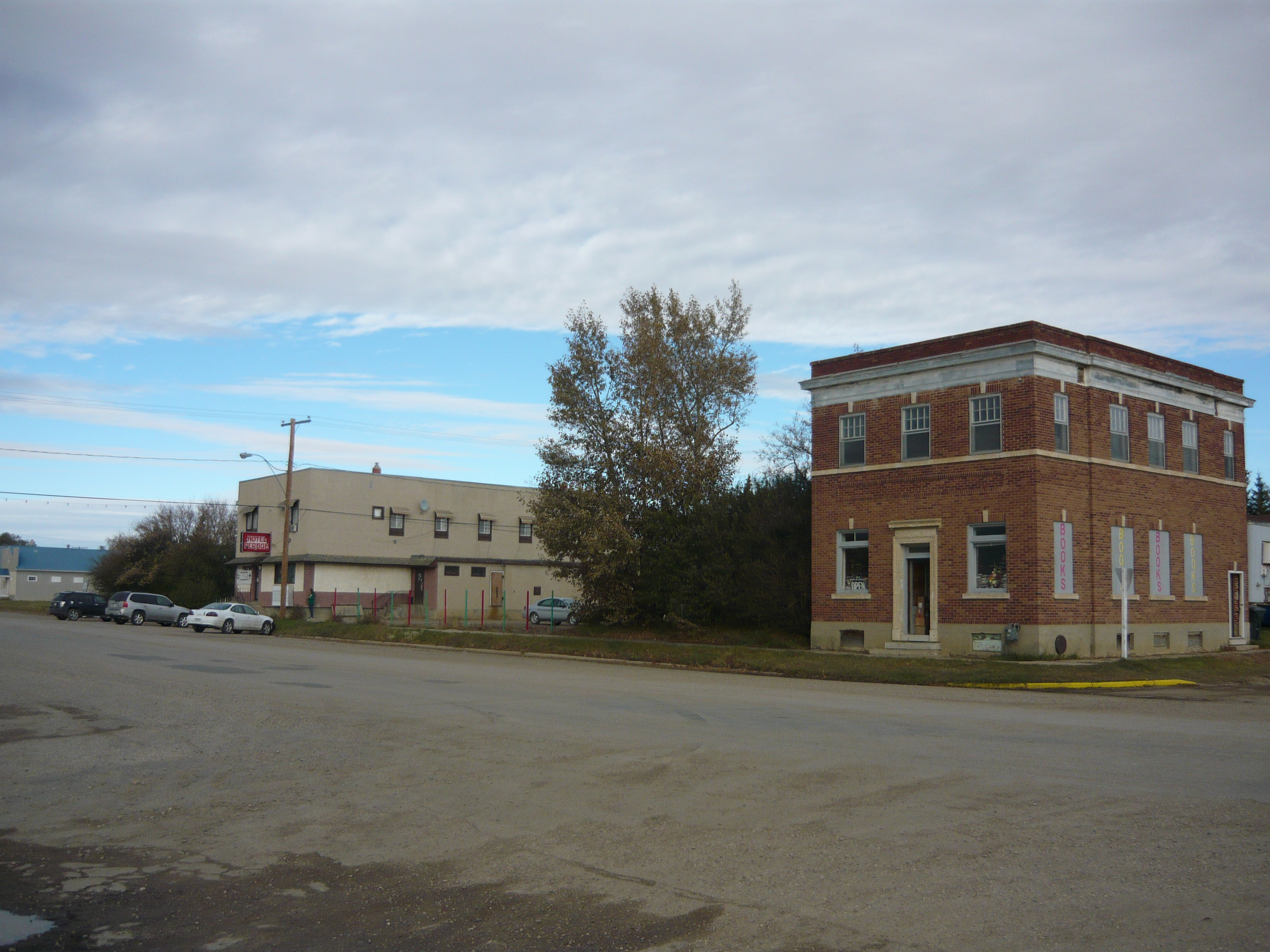
- Perdue's Main Street
- Motto: Pride of the Prairies
- Location in Saskatchewan Perdue (Canada)
- Coordinates: 52°03′15″N 107°32′41″W
- Country: Canada
- Province: Saskatchewan
- Region: Central
- Census division: 12
- Rural Municipality: Perdue No. 346
- Post office founded: 1907
- Incorporated (village): 1909

Government
  - Type: Municipal
  - Governing body: Perdue Village Council
  - Mayor: Terry Fyson
  - Administrator: Andrea Ball
  - MP: Kelly Block
  - MLA: Jim Reiter

Area
  - Total: 2.65 km^{2} (1.02 sq mi)

Population (2016)
  - Total: 334
  - Density: 304.5/km^{2} (789/sq mi)
- Time zone: UTC−6 (CST)
- Postal code: S0K 3C0
- Area code: 306
- Highways: Highway 14 Highway 655
- Railways: Canadian Pacific Kansas City
- Website: www.villageofperdue.com

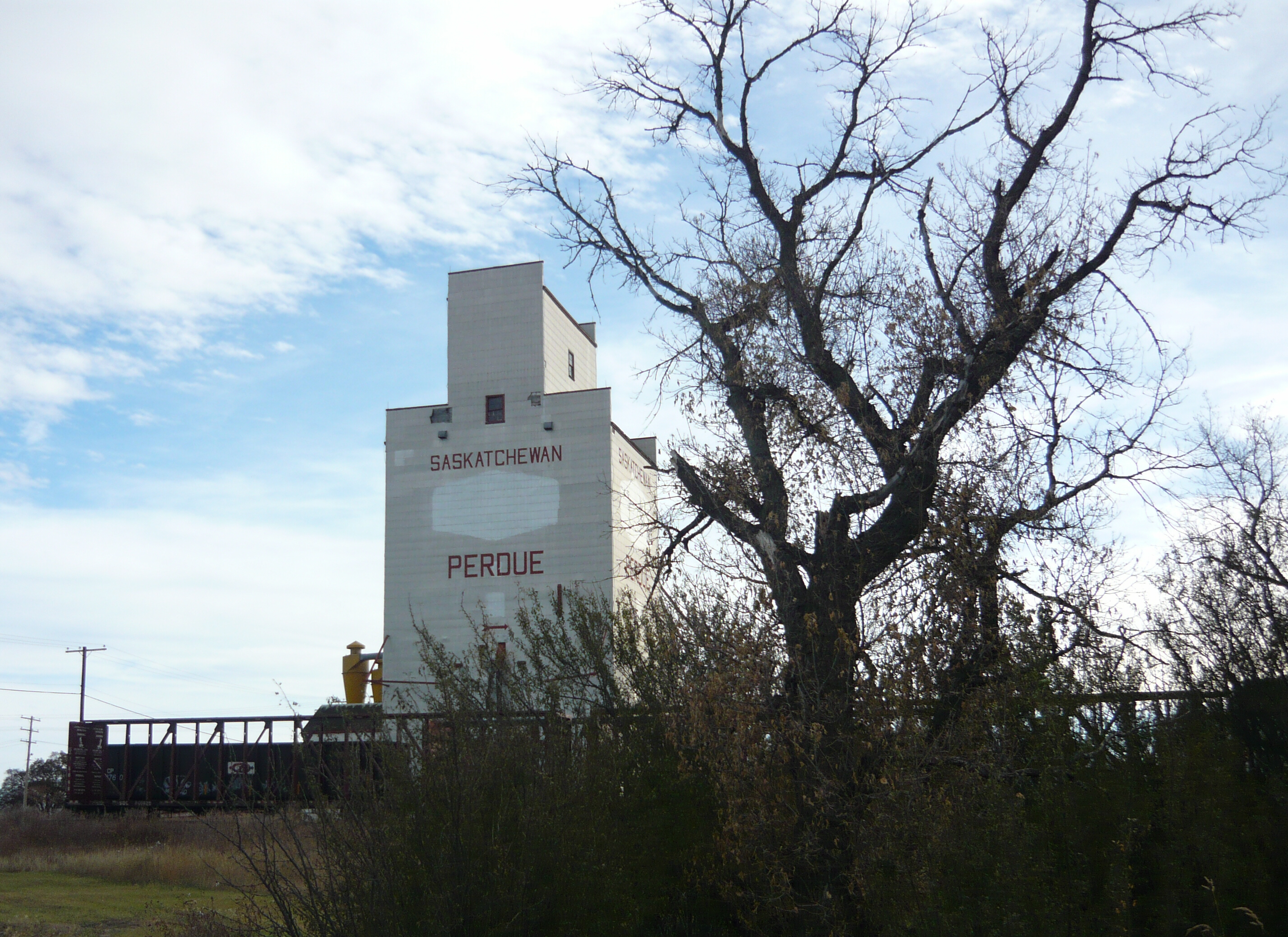
Grain elevator

Perdue (/pərˈdjuː/; 2016 population: 334) is a village in the Canadian province of Saskatchewan within the Rural Municipality of Perdue No. 346 and Census Division No. 12. Perdue is approximately 60 kilometres (37 mi) west of Saskatoon on Highway 14.

== History ==
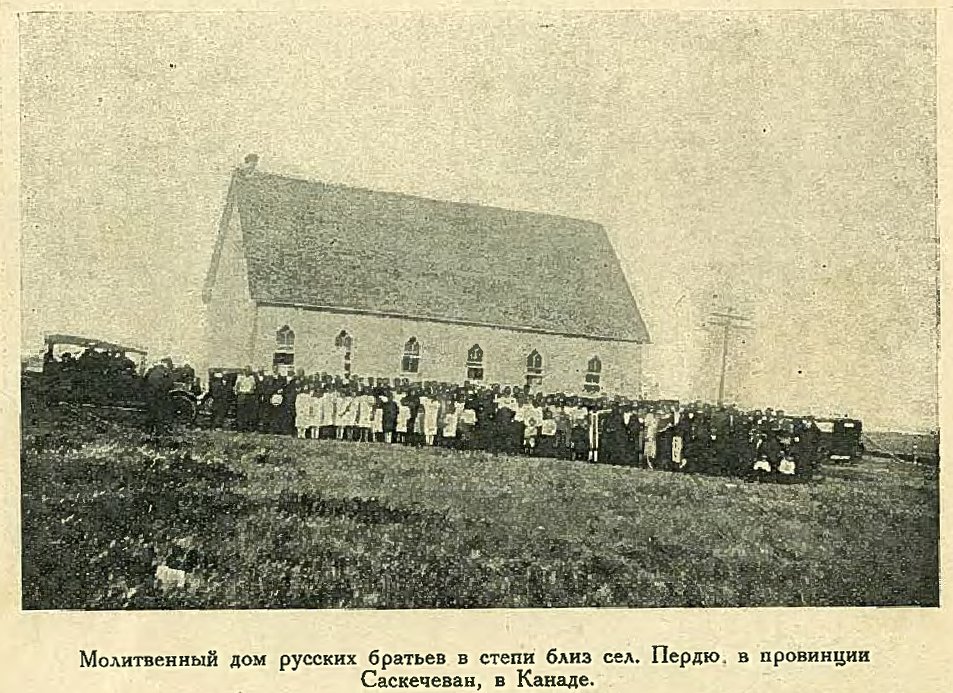
Community of Evangelicalists (Prohanoff's) and their prayer house in Perdue

Perdue incorporated as a village on July 15, 1909.

== Demographics ==
Population history (1981–2016)
Year	Pop.	±%
1981	407	—
1986	400	−1.7%
1991	395	−1.2%
1996	403	+2.0%
2001	372	−7.7%
2006	364	−2.2%
2011	362	−0.5%
2016	334	−7.7%
Source: Statistics Canada via Saskatchewan Bureau of Statistics

In the 2021 Census of Population conducted by Statistics Canada, Perdue had a population of 313 living in 155 of its 177 total private dwellings, a change of −6.3% from its 2016 population of 334. With a land area of 1.03 km^{2} (0.40 sq mi), it had a population density of 303.9/km^{2} (787.1/sq mi) in 2021.

In the 2016 Census of Population, the Village of Perdue recorded a population of 334 living in 165 of its 176 total private dwellings, a −8.4% change from its 2011 population of 362. With a land area of 1.1 km^{2} (0.42 sq mi), it had a population density of 303.6/km^{2} (786.4/sq mi) in 2016.

== Economy ==
Perdue has several businesses and services. Perdue has a credit union, grocery and liquor store, post office, insurance broker, massage therapist, and a daycare. Perdue Hotel, which was built in the early 1900s, stands on Main Street. Along Highway 14 is Full Line Ag and Great Plains Co-Op, and west of town is the Perdue Oasis golf course and restaurant.

== Recreation and activities ==
Within the village of Perdue are several recreational facilities. On the west edge of town are baseball diamonds, a curling rink, fairgrounds, and a bowling alley. On the east edge of town was the Perdue Arena, which burnt down in 2015, but the community began fundraising for a new arena shortly after.

The Perdue Agricultural Society hosts Extreme Redneck Days on Canada Day which consists of ATV and mod truck mud drag races, Li'l Buckaroo Rodeo and various entertainment plus beer gardens and fireworks. Also hosted by the Society is the annual Perdue Fair on the last weekend of July. This takes place with 4H events held at the fairgrounds, a slow-pitch tournament, and handicraft and agricultural exhibits displayed in the curling rink and Perdue Recreation Complex. Entries are judged by local members of the Agricultural Society. There is also a parade during the fair that travels through the village, ending up at the fair grounds.

Perdue is also home to a branch of the Royal Canadian Legion and Legion Ladies Auxiliary.

== Government ==
The village of Perdue is surrounded by the Rural Municipality of Perdue No. 346, whose office is located in Perdue, the municipality had a slightly larger population of 445 in the 2016 Canada Census.

The village of Perdue is governed by four councillors, a mayor, and an administrator.

Provincially the village is within the Rosetown-Elrose electoral district, whose current MLA is Jim Reiter of the Saskatchewan Party.

Federally the village is within the riding of Carlton Trail-Eagle Creek whose current MP is Kelly Block of the Conservative Party of Canada.

== Education ==
Perdue School is a K-12 school with approximately 140 students. Perdue is home to the Perdue branch of the Wheatland Regional Library, which is located in the Perdue Recreation Complex. The Perdue School has volleyball teams, basketball, cross country, track, badminton and more; they are the Perdue Steelers.

== See also ==
- List of communities in Saskatchewan
