= Rural Municipality of Mariposa No. 350 =

Rural municipality in Saskatchewan, Canada

Mariposa No. 350
- Rural municipality
- Rural Municipality of Mariposa No. 350
- Location of the RM of Mariposa No. 350 in Saskatchewan
- Coordinates: 52.009°N 108.966°W
- Country: Canada
- Province: Saskatchewan
- Census division: 13
- SARM division: 6
- Formed: December 12, 1910

Government
  - Reeve: Dale MacArthur
  - Governing body: RM of Mariposa No. 350 Council
  - Administrator: Kathy Wurz
  - Office location: Kerrobert

Area (2016)
  - Land: 636.73 km^{2} (245.84 sq mi)

Population (2016)
  - Total: 205
  - Density: 0.3/km^{2} (0.78/sq mi)
- Time zone: CST
  - Summer (DST): CST
- Area codes: 306 and 639

The Rural Municipality of Mariposa No. 350 (2016 population: 205) is a rural municipality (RM) in the Canadian province of Saskatchewan within Census Division No. 13 and SARM Division No. 6.

== History ==
The RM of Mariposa No. 350 incorporated as a rural municipality on December 12, 1910.

== Geography ==
=== Communities and localities ===
The following urban municipalities are surrounded by the RM.

Villages

- Tramping Lake

The following unincorporated communities are within the RM.

Localities

- Broadacres

== Demographics ==
Population history (1981–2016)
Year	Pop.	±%
1981	411	—
1986	383	−6.8%
1991	337	−12.0%
1996	291	−13.6%
2001	265	−8.9%
2006	225	−15.1%
2011	220	−2.2%
2016	205	−6.8%
Source: Statistics Canada via Saskatchewan Bureau of Statistics

In the 2021 Census of Population conducted by Statistics Canada, the RM of Mariposa No. 350 had a population of 291 living in 70 of its 86 total private dwellings, a change of 42% from its 2016 population of 205. With a land area of 635.16 km^{2} (245.24 sq mi), it had a population density of 0.5/km^{2} (1.2/sq mi) in 2021.

In the 2016 Census of Population, the RM of Mariposa No. 350 recorded a population of 205 living in 86 of its 98 total private dwellings, a −6.8% change from its 2011 population of 220. With a land area of 636.73 km^{2} (245.84 sq mi), it had a population density of 0.3/km^{2} (0.8/sq mi) in 2016.

== Government ==
The RM of Mariposa No. 350 is governed by an elected municipal council and an appointed administrator that meets on the second Wednesday of every month. The reeve of the RM is Dale MacArthur while its administrator is Kathy Wurz. The RM's office is located in Kerrobert.

== See also ==
- List of rural municipalities in Saskatchewan
- List of communities in Saskatchewan
